= List of mountains of Alberta =

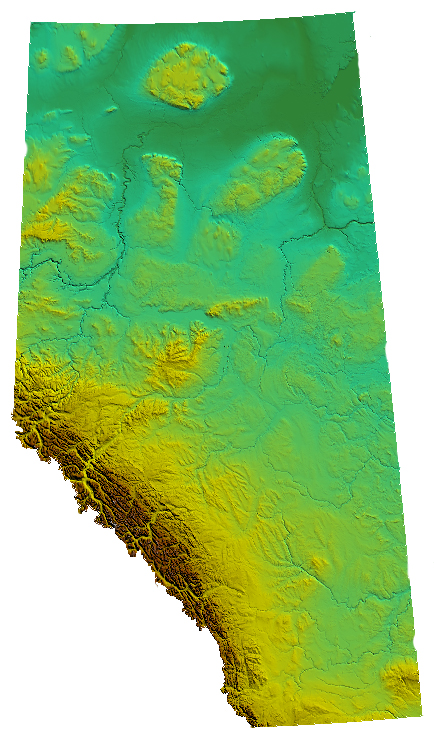
Relief of Alberta

Most of Alberta's mountains are found on the western edge of the province of Alberta, consisting of the eastern slopes of the Canadian Rockies, which run through the province from Alberta's mid-point to its southern border with the United States. Other elevated spots can be found in the Caribou Mountains and the Cypress Hills.

The peaks of the Canadian Rockies are majestic, many of them reaching a height of more than three kilometres above sea level. Alberta's southwestern boundary is traced on the Continental Divide, along the high ranges of the Rocky Mountains, and many peaks are located on the Alberta–British Columbia border. The peak of Mount Columbia, within Jasper National Park, is the highest point in Alberta, second highest in the Canadian Rockies and 28th highest in Canada.

The Caribou Mountains are located in the northern extremity of Alberta, forming an elevated plateau in the northern plains and wetlands. They reach an altitude of 1,030 m, almost 700 m higher than the surrounding area.

While not considered mountains, the Cypress Hills, located in the south-eastern corner of Alberta, extending into Saskatchewan, constitute the highest terrain in Canada between the Rocky Mountains and Labrador. They reach a maximum elevation of 1,468 m, 600 m above the surrounding prairie.

== List of mountains ==
Peak	Height (m)	Height (ft)	Range	Remarks
Aberdeen	3,157	10,358	Bow Range	Named for 7th Governor General of Canada
Abraham	2,820	9,250	Front Range	Named for a Stoney Indian guide
Adam Joachim	3,094	10,151	Winston Churchill Range	
Aeolus	2,643	8,671	Bosche Range	
Aiguille	2,999	9,839	Waputik Range	Named for French word aiguille, meaning needle
Alberta	3,619	11,873	Winston Churchill Range	Third highest in Alberta
Alexandra	3,401	11,158	Park Ranges	Named for Queen Alexandra
Allan	2,819	9,249	Kananaskis Range	
Allen	3,310	10,860	Bow Range	Part of the Valley of the Ten Peaks
Allenby	2,995	9,826	Sundance Range	Named for a British Army field-marshal who served in WWI
Allison	2,646	8,681	High Rock Range	Named for a law enforcement agent
Allstones	2,940	9,650	Front Ranges	
Alnus Peak	2,968	9,738	Park Ranges	Alnus is Latin name for Alder tree
Amber	2,565	8,415	Maligne Range	
Amery	3,329	10,922	Lyell Group	
Anderson	2,685	8,809	Clark Range	
Andromache	3,033	9,951	Front Ranges	
Andromeda	3,450	11,320	Columbia Icefield	
Angle	2,910	9,550	Front Ranges	
Anthozoan	2,695	8,842	Slate Range	
Anûkathâ Îpa	2,514	8,248	Fairholme Range	Previously known by a racist name
Apex	3,246	10,650	Park Ranges	Located in the centre of the Clemenceau Icefield
Apparition	3,002	9,849	Palliser Range	
Aquila	2,730	8,960	Park Ranges	Named after the eagles in the area
Arethusa	2,912	9,554	Misty Range	Named for a British cruiser sunk in WWI
Aries Peak	3,012	9,882	Waputik Mountains	Named for the sheep found on its slopes
Armstrong	2,823	9,262	High Rock Range	Named for Canadian soldier killed in WWI
Assiniboine	3,616	11,864	Assiniboine Group	Highest peak of the Southern Continental Ranges
Association	2,362	7,749	Fairholme Range	
Astley	2,869	9,413	Palliser Range	
Athabasca	3,491	11,453	Columbia Icefield	
Aurora	2,790	9,150	Blue Range	
Avens	2,972	9,751	Sawback Range	Named for a flower
Aye	3,243	10,640	Park Ranges	On the Continental Divide
Aylmer	3,162	10,374	Palliser Range	
Babel	3,101	10,174	Bow Range	
Backus	1,815	5,955	Canadian Rockies	
Baker	3,180	10,430	Waputik Mountains	On the Continental Divide
Baldy	2,192	7,192	Fisher Range	
Balinhard	3,130	10,270	Park Ranges	Named for a Scottish Earl
Ball	3,311	10,863	Ball Range	Named for a politician who helped secure funding for the Palliser expedition
Balfour	3,272	10,735	Waputik Range	Named for a Scottish botanist
Banded	2,934	9,626	Kananaskis Range	Named for distinctive limestone cliff band
Barbette	3,072	10,079	Waputik Mountains	
Barlow	3,120	10,240	Park Ranges	Named for a GSC cartographer who died in a maritime disaster
Barnard	3,339	10,955	Park Ranges	Named for a Lt. Governor of B.C.
Barricade	3,180	10,430	Front Ranges	
Basilica	2,899	9,511	Park Ranges	
Bastion	2,994	9,823	Park Ranges	
Bauerman	2,377	7,799	Border Ranges	Named for a government geologist
Beacon	2,986	9,797	Park Ranges	
Beatrice	3,125	10,253	Ball Range	On the Continental Divide
Beatty	3,004	9,856	Park Ranges	On the Continental Divide
Beaupré	2,778	9,114	Victoria Cross Ranges	
Beehive (High Rock)	2,895	9,498	High Rock Range	On the Continental Divide
Beehive (Lake Louise)	2,270	7,450	Bow Range	
Beersheba	3,054	10,020	Sundance Range	
Bell	2,910	9,550	Bow Range	
Bennington	3,260	10,700	Park Ranges	
Bergne	3,176	10,420	Park Ranges	Named for mountaineer who died in a climbing accident
Bertha	2,454	8,051	Clark Range	
Bess	3,203	10,509	Front Ranges	
Bident	3,088	10,131	Bow Range	Shape of a bident
Big Bend	2,804	9,199	Columbia Icefield	
Bishop	2,850	9,350	Elk Range	–
Birdwood	3,097	10,161	Spray Mountains	
Blackfriars	3,215	10,548	Park Ranges	
Blackhorn	3,000	9,800	South Jasper Ranges	
Black Prince	2,939	9,642	Spray Mountains	
Black Rock Mountain	2,462	8,077	Front Ranges	
Blakiston	2,910	9,550	Clark Range	Highest in Waterton Lakes National Park
Blane	2,993	9,820	Opal Range	
Block	2,935	9,629	Sawback Range	
Bluerock	2,789	9,150	Front Ranges	
Bogart	3,144	10,315	Kananaskis Range	
Bolton	2,706	8,878	High Rock Range	Named for Canadian soldier killed in World War I
Bonnet	3,235	10,614	Sawback Range	
Boom	2,760	9,060	Bow Range	Named after Boom Lake
Boswell	2,454	8,051	Border Ranges	
Bourgeau	2,930	9,610	Massive Range	
Bow Peak	2,840	9,320	Waputik Mountains	
Brachiopod	2,667	8,750	Slate Range	
Brazeau	3,470	11,380	Brazeau Range	
Breaker	3,058	10,033	Waputik Range	
Brett	2984	9790	Massive Range	
Brewster	2859	9380	Vermilion Range	
Bridgland	2930	9613	Victoria Cross Ranges	
Brock	2902	9521	Opal Range	
Brussels	3161	10371	Park Ranges	
Bryant	2629	8625	Fisher Range	
Buller	2805	9203	Kananaskis Range	
Bulyea	3,332	10,932	Park Ranges	Named after first Lieutenant-Governor of Alberta
Burke	2542	8340		
Burney	2934	9626	Opal Range	
Burns	2936	9633	Front Ranges	
Burstall	2760	9055	Spray Mountains	
Byng	2,940	9,650	Blue Range	
Cairngorm	2,610	8,560	Victoria Cross Ranges	
Caldron	2,909	9,544	Waputik Range	
Cambrai	3,165	10,384	Park Ranges	Named for Battle of Cambrai (1917)
Campion	2,484	8,150	Hoff Range	
Caribou	1,030	3,380	Caribou Mountains	Range in northern Alberta wetlands
Cascade	2,998	9,836	Vermillion Range	
Castle	2,766	9,075	Sawback Range	
Castelets	2,884	9,462	Columbia Icefield	
Catacombs	3,290	10,790		
Cataract	3,333	10,935	Front Ranges	Named for nearby Cataract Creek
Charles Stewart	2,809	9,216	Fairholme Range	
Cautley	2,880	9,450	Park Ranges	Named for a surveyor
Cave	2,650	8,690	Park Ranges	On the Continental Divide
Centre	2,700	8,900	Maligne Range	Named for its location between two mountains
Chaba	3,212	10,538	Park Ranges	Chaba is the Nakoda word for beaver
Chak	2,775	9,104		
Charlton	3,217	10,554	Queen Elizabeth Ranges	
Chephren	3,266	10,715	Waputik Range	Former name: Pyramid Mountain
Chester	3,054	10,020	Kananaskis Range	
Chetamon	2,606	8,550		
Chevron	2,835	9,301	Park Ranges	Named for similarity to a chevron
Chimney	3,002	9,849	Bow Range	Named for chimney feature on climbing route
Chinook	2,591	8,501	Flathead Range	
Chown	3,316	10,879	Front Ranges	
Christian	3,406	11,175	Park Ranges	Named for Swiss mountain guide
Christie	3,103	10,180		
Cirque	2,993	9,820		
Cinquefoil	2,256	7,402	Jacques Range	
Cirrus	3,270	10,730		
Citadel	2,625	8,612		On the Continental Divide
Clairvaux	2,690	8,830	Park Ranges	French word meaning "clear valleys"
Cliff	2,763	9,065	Front Ranges	Named for steep faces on all sides
Cline	3361	11027	Park Ranges	
Cockscomb	2776	9108	Sawback Range	
Coleman	3135	10285		
Colin	2687	8816	Colin Range	
Coliseum	2035	6677	Canadian Rockies	Named for the Colosseum in Rome
Columbia	3747	12294	Winston Churchill Range	Highest peak in Alberta
Commonwealth	2775	9104	Spray Mountains	
Compression	2545	8351	Fisher Range	
Cone	2910	9548	Sundance Range	On the Continental Divide
Confederation	2969	9741	Winston Churchill Range	
Consort	2883	9459	Victoria Cross Ranges	
Conway	3,098	10,164	Park Ranges	Named for a British mountaineer
Copper	2,795	9,170	Ball Range	
Cordonnier	3,012	9,882	Park Ranges	Named for a French army general
Cornwall	2970	9744		
Cornwell	2972	9750	Kananaskis Range	On the Continental Divide
Coronach	2462	8077	Bosche Range	
Coronation	3,176	10,420	Park Ranges	
Coronet	3152	10341		
Cory	2802	9193	Sawback Range	
Costigan	2,973	9,754	Palliser Range	Named for a Canadian politician
Côté	2,391	7,844	Front Ranges	Named for a Canadian politician
Cougar	2863	9394		
Crandell	2381	7812	Clark Range	
Cromwell	3,380	11,090	Winston Churchill Range	Named for one of the FA climbers
Crowfoot	3055	10023		Site of Crowfoot Glacier
Crowsnest	2785	9137	Crowsnest Range	Southernmost peak in Alberta
Cumnock	2438	7999	De Smet Range	
Curator	2624	8609	Maligne Range	
Curia	2,873	9,426	Park Ranges	Named for its resemblance to a curia
Currie	2,770	9,090	Blue Range	
Cyclone	3,050	10,010	Park Ranges	Named for a storm that occurred during first ascent
Cypress	1,468	4,816		Highest point between Rockies and Labrador
Darrah	2,755	9,039	Flathead Range	Named for an astronomer
Deltaform	3,424	11,234	Bow Range	Part of the Valley of the Ten Peaks
Davidson	2,919	9,577	Canadian Rockies	
Dent	3,267	10,719	Park Ranges	Named after an English mountaineer
De Veber	2,573	8,442	Front Ranges	Named for a Canadian politician
Devils Head	2,997	9,833	Canadian Rockies	
Devon	3,004	9,856	Front Ranges	Named for the Devonian period
Diadem	3,371	11,060	Winston Churchill Range	
Division	3,020	9,910	Canadian Rockies	
Dolomite	2,998	9,836	Front Ranges → Murchison Group	Named for resemblance to the Dolomites in the Italian Alps
Douai	3,120	10,240	Park Ranges	Named for a village in France
Dragon	2,880	9,450	Park Ranges	Named for its dragon-shaped rock formation
Dromore	2,660	8,730	Colin Range	Named for a town in Ireland
Drummond	3,148	10,328	Park Ranges	Named for an explorer
Dungarvan	2,575	8,448		Waterton Lakes NP
Dungeon	3,129	10,266	Park Ranges	
Eagle	2,820	9,250		
Eden	3,180	10,430	Park Ranges	
Edith	2,554	8,379	Sawback Range	
Edith Cavell	3,363	11,033	South Jasper Ranges	
Elephas	2,978	9,770	Park Ranges	
Elliott	2,873	9,426		
Elpoca	3,036	9,961	Opal Range	
Emigrants	2,553	8,376	Victoria Cross Ranges	Named for gold miners of the Cariboo Gold Rush
End	2,453	8,048		
Engadine	2,972	9,751	Kananaskis Range	
Engelhard	3,270	10,730	Winston Churchill Range	
Ehagay Nakoda	2,685	8,809	South Banff Range	Named for a Stoney Nakoda legend about the mountain
Epaulette	3,094	10,151	Waputik Mountains	
Erasmus	3,265	10,712	Central Icefields	
Erebus	3,112	10,210	Park Ranges	
Ermatinger	3,060	10,040	Park Ranges	
Ernest	3,498	11,476	Park Ranges	Highest peak of Mt. Lyell
Ernest Ross	2,454	8,051		–
Esplanade	2,301	7,549		
Estella	3,069	10,069	Trident Range	
Etherington	2,877	9,439	High Rock Range	
Evans	3,210	10,530	Park Ranges	Named for British Antarctic explorer
Evan-Thomas	3,097	10,161	Opal Range	
Evelyn	2,855	9,367	Maligne Range	Unofficial name
Ex Coelis	2,545	8,350		
Fable	2,702	8,865	Fairholme Range	
Fairview	2,744	9,003	Bow Range	Also called Mount Fairview
Fatigue	2,950	9,680	Park Ranges	On the Continental Divide
Fay	3,235	10,614	Bow Range	
Fiddle	2243	7359	Fiddle Range	
Fifi	2621	8599	Sawback Range	
Fist	2630	8629	Spray Mountains	
Finger	2545	8350	Sawback Range	Unofficial name
Fisher	3053	10019	Fisher Range	
Flints	2950	9682	Vermilion Range	
Foch	3,194	10,479	Park Ranges	On the Continental Divide
Font	2,353	7,720	Clark Range	
Forbes	3,612	11,850	Park Ranges	Named for a natural history professor
Forget	2,121	6,959	Front Ranges	Named for a Canadian politician
Forgetmenot	2,332	7,651		
Fortress, The	3,000	9,800	Kananaskis Range	Named for its fortress like appearance
Fortune	2,340	7,680	Park Ranges	Named for a naval ship
Forum	2,415	7,923	Border Ranges	Named for lake at its base
Fossil	2,946	9,665	Slate Range	
Fox	2,973	9,754	Park Ranges	Named for an English engineer
Franchère	2,805	9,203		Jasper NP
Fraser	3,322	10,899	Park Ranges	Named for explorer of British Columbia
French	3,244	10,643	Spray Mountains	
Freshfield	3,336	10,945	Park Ranges	Named for a British climber
Fresnoy	3,240	10,630	Park Ranges	Named for a village in France
Fryatt	3,361	11,027		South of Edith Cavell
Fullerton	2,728	8,950	Fisher Range	
Galatea	3,185	10,449	Kananaskis Range	
Galwey	2,377	7,799	Crowsnest Range	
Gap	2,675	8,776	Opal Range	
Gargoyle	2,693	8,835		
Garth	3,043	9,984	Park Ranges	Named for a local fur trader
GEC	3,130	10,270	Winston Churchill Range	Named for trio who did FA
Gendarme Mountain	2,927	9,603	Park Ranges	
Geraldine	2,930	9,610		Unofficial name
Gibraltar	2,665	8,743	Highwood Range	
Gilgit	3,090	10,140	Park Ranges	Named for Gilgit, Pakistan
Girouard	2,995	9,826	Fairholme Range	
Glacier	3,302	10,833	Park Ranges	Named for glacier on north side
Glasgow	2,935	9,629		
Gloria	2,908	9,541	Park Ranges	Named for lake on northern side
Goatview	2,804	9,199	Goat Range	
Golden Eagle	3,048	10,000	Park Ranges	Named for golden eagles in the area
Golden	2,933	9,623	Park Ranges	On the Continental Divide
Gong	3120	10237	Winston Churchill Range	
Gordon	3161	10368	Waputik Range	
Gorman	2,380	7,810	Northern Rocky Mountains	Named for a DLS surveyor
Grant MacEwan	2149	7051	Bow Valley	
Greenock	2073	6081	De Smet Range	
Grisette	2620	8600	Colin Range	
Grotto	2706	8878	Fairholme Range	
Gusty	3,000	9,800	Kananaskis Range	
Ha Ling Peak	2,407	7,897		Former name: Chinaman's Peak
Habel	3,073	10,082	Waputik Mountains	Named for a German geographer
Haddo	3,070	10,070	Bow Range	
Haiduk	2,920	9,580	Ball Range	On the Continental Divide
Haig	2,610	8,560	Clark Range	Named for a British astronomer
Hardisty	2,716	8,911	Maligne Range	
Hawk	2,553	8,376	Colin Range	
Head	2,782	9,127	Highwood Range	
Heart	2,135	7,005	Bow Valley	Named for its heart-shaped appearance
Heather	2,636	8,648	Slate Range	
Hector	3,394	11,135	Front Ranges → Murchison Group	Named for a geologist on the Palliser expedition
Helmer	3,030	9,940	Park Ranges	Named for father and son killed in World War I
Henry MacLeod	3,315	10,876	Queen Elizabeth Ranges	
Hilda	3,058	10,033	Columbia Icefield	
Holcroft	2,713	8,901	High Rock Range	Named for soldier killed in World War I
Holy Cross	2,650	8,690	Highwood Range	
Hood	2,903	9,524	Opal Range	Named for a British Admiral who died in combat during World War I
Hooker	3,287	10,784	Park Ranges	Named for an English botanist
Howard	2,777	9,111	Fisher Range	
Howard Douglas	2,877	9,439	Park Ranges	
Howse	3,295	10,810	Waputik Range	
Hungabee	3,492	11,457	Bow Range	
Indefatigable	2,670	8,760	Spray Mountains	
Indian Ridge	2,820	9,250	Trident Range	
Inflexible	3,000	9,800	Kananaskis Range	Named for HMS Inflexible
Inglismaldie	2,964	9,724	Fairholme Range	
Intersection	2,452	8,045	Front Ranges	Intersection where BC/Alberta border diverges from 120th Meridian
Invincible	2,700	8,900	Spray Mountains	
Isabelle	2,926	9,600	Ball Range	
Ishbel	2,908	9,541	Sawback Range	
James Walker	3,035	9,957	Kananaskis Range	
Jellicoe	3,075	10,089	Spray Mountains	
Jerram	2,996	9,829	Opal Range	–
Jimmy Simpson	2,966	9,731	Waputik Mountains	
Joffre	3,450	11,320	Elk Range	On the Continental Divide
John Laurie	2,240	7,350	Bow Valley	Also named Mount Yamnuska
Julian	2,869	9,413	Queen Elizabeth Ranges	
Jumpingpound	2,240	7,350	Kananaskis Range	
Junction	2,682	8,799	Highwood Range	
Karpathos	2,987	9,800		
Kent	2,635	8,645	Kananaskis Range	
Kerr	2,560	8,400	Victoria Cross Ranges	
Kenow	2,697	8,848	Clark Range	On the Continental Divide
Kerkeslin	2,984	9,790	Maligne Range	
Kidd	2,958	9,705	Kananaskis Range	
King Albert	2,987	9,800	Park Ranges	Named for King Albert of Belgium
King Edward (Mount)	3,490	11,450	Columbia Icefield	
Kista	2,576	8,451	Ram Range	
Kitchener	3,505	11,499	Winston Churchill Range	
Kleodora	2,850	9,350	Park Ranges	
Lady Macdonald	2,606	8,550	Fairholme Range	Named for wife of first Prime Minister of Canada
Lambe	3,182	10,440	Park Ranges	Named for a Canadian palaeontologist
Lawrence Grassi	2,685	8,809	Canadian Rockies	Named for Lawrence Grassi
Lawson	2,795	9,170	Kananaskis Range	
La Coulotte Peak	2,438	7,999	Flathead Range	
La Coulotte Ridge	2,438	7,999	Flathead Range	Named for area in France where Canadian troops fought in WWI
Lefroy	3,423	11,230	Bow Range	Named for an English astronomer
Leah	2,801	9,190	Queen Elizabeth Ranges	
Lectern	2,772	9,094	Trident Range	
Leman	2,730	8,960	Park Ranges	Named for Belgian General of WWI
Leval	2,713	8,901	Blue Range	Named for lawyer who represented Edith Cavell in her WWI trial
Lipalian	2,710	8,890	Slate Range	
Lipsett	2,575	8,448	Misty Range	
Little	3,134	10,282	Bow Range	Named for member of the first ascent party
Little Alberta	2,956	9,698	Winston Churchill Range	
Little Temple	2,653	8,704	Bow Range	
Loomis	2,798	9,180	Elk Range (Canada)	On the Continental Divide
Lorette	2,487	8,159	Kananaskis Range	
Loudon	3,221	10,568	Murchison Group	
Lougheed	3,107	10,194	Kananaskis Range	
Louis	2,682	8,799	Sawback Range	
Low	3,090	10,140	Park Ranges	Named for a Canadian geologist
Lowell	3,150	10,330	Park Ranges	
Lunette	3,428	11,247	Park Ranges	Directly SE of Mount Assiniboine
Lyall	2,950	9,680	High Rock Range	Named for a Scottish botanist
Lyautey	3,045	9,990	Park Ranges	
Lychnis	3,124	10,249	Sawback Range	
Lyell	3,498	11,476	Central Icefields	Consists of five distinct peaks
Lynx	3,192	10,472	Rainbow Range	Named for Lynx bones found on nearby Coleman Glacier
Machray	2,749	9,019	Park Ranges	Named for an American bishop
Maclaren	2,843	9,327	High Rock Range	Named for a general of the Canadian army in World War I
Mahood	2,896	9,501	Victoria Cross Ranges	
Majestic	3,086	10,125	Trident Range	
Maligne	3,200	10,500	Queen Elizabeth Ranges	
Mangin	3,057	10,030	Park Ranges	Named for a French army general
Mary Barclay's	2,260	7,410	Kananaskis Range	
Manx	3,044	9,987	Trident Range	
Marlborough	2,973	9,754	Park Ranges	
Marmot	2,608	8,556	Trident Range	
Marvel	2,650	8,690	Blue Range	
Massive	2,435	7,989	Massive Range	
Maude	3,043	9,984	Spray Mountains	On the Continental Divide
McCord	2,511	8,238	Park Ranges	Named for a surveyor
McDougall	2,726	8,944	Fisher Range	
McGillivray	2,451	8,041	Kananaskis Range	
McGladrey	2,638	8,655	Flathead Range	
McGuire	3,030	9,940	Winston Churchill Range	
McHarg	2,888	9,475	Spray Mountains	Named for Canadian army officer killed in WWI
McLaren	2,301	7,549	Flathead Range	
McPhail	2,883	9,459	Elk Range	On the Continental Divide
Mercer	2,970	9,740	Sundance Range	
Merlin	2,711	8,894	Jacques Range	
Michener	2,545	8,350	Ram Range	
Midnight	2,340	7,680	Fisher Range	
Mist	3,140	10,300	Misty Range	
Mistaya	3,078	10,098	Waputik Mountains	
Mitchell	3,040	9,970	Winston Churchill Range	
Mitre	2,850	9,350	Bow Range	
Monarch	2,777	9,111	Victoria Cross Ranges	
Monkhead	3,250	10,660	Canadian Rockies	
Moose	2,437	7,995	Kananaskis Range	
Morden Long	3,040	9,970	Winston Churchill Range	
Morkill	2,286	7,500	Front Ranges	Named for a BC land surveyor
Morrison	2,765	9,072	Blue Range	
Morro	1,679	5,509	Colin Range	
Muhigan	2,626	8,615	Trident Range	
Muir	2,758	9,049	High Rock Range	Named for Canadian poet/songwriter
Mumm	2,962	9,718	Park Ranges	Named for English mountaineer who completed FA
Murchison	3,353	11,001	Murchison Group	
Murray	3,026	9,928	Spray Mountains	
Mushroom	3,210	10,530	Winston Churchill Range	
Mystic	2,960	9,710	Sawback Range	
Nanga Parbat	3,240	10,630	Park Ranges	Named for Nanga Parbat
Nasswald	3,042	9,980	Park Ranges	On the Continental Divide
Nelson	3,150	10,330	Winston Churchill Range	
Neptuak	3,233	10,607	Bow Range	Part of the Valley of the Ten Peaks
Nestor	2970	9744	Goat Range (Alberta)	
Niblock	2976	9764	Bow Range	
Nigel	3211	10535	Columbia Icefield	
Nomad	2,544	8,346	Spray Mountains	Named for British warship sunk in WW I
Norquay	2,522	8,274	Vermilion Range	
North Twin	3730	12240	Winston Churchill Range	Part of the Twin Peaks massif
Northover	3,048	10,000	Park Ranges	Named for Canadian army officer who earned the Military Cross
Noyes	3,085	10,121	Murchison Group	
Oates	3,120	10,240	Park Ranges	Named for British army officer who perished in Antarctica
O'Beirne	2,637	8,652	Park Ranges	
Observation	3,174	10,413		
Odlum	2,695	8,842	Elk Range	On the Continental Divide
Og	2,874	9,429	Park Ranges	Named for a Biblical reference
Old Baldy	2,726	8,944	Fisher Range	
Old Goat	3,120	10,240	Goat Range	
Oldhorn	3,000	9,800	Trident Range	
Olive	3,126	10,256	Park Ranges	
Oliver	2,865	9,400	Victoria Cross Ranges	
Omega	3,060	10,040	Park Ranges	
Opal	2,840	9,320	Queen Elizabeth Ranges	
Oppy	3,335	10,942	Park Ranges	Named for a village in France
Oubliette	3,070	10,070	Park Ranges	
Outlaw	2,957	9,701		
Outpost	2,880	9,450	Park Ranges	
Outram	3,245	10,646	Forbes Group	
Oyster	2,777	9,111	Sawback Range	
Packenham	3,000	9,800	Opal Range	
Palmer	3,150	10,330	Winston Churchill Range	
Panther	2,943	9,656	Bare Range	
Paragon	3,030	9,940	Park Ranges	
Parapet	3,030	9,940	Park Ranges	
Parrish	2,530	8,300	Flathead Range	
Patterson	3,191	10,469	Waputik Range	
Paul	2,850	9,350	Queen Elizabeth Ranges	
Pauline	2,653	8,704	Park Ranges	Named for a Canadian politician
Peechee	2,935	9,629	Fairholme Range	
Pengelly	2,586	8,484	Flathead Range	
Perren	3,051	10,010	Bow Range	Named for a climbing guide
Peskett	3,124	10,249	Murchison Group	
Unnamed (formerly Pétain)	3,196	10,486	Park Ranges	On the Continental Divide
Peveril	2,686	8,812	Trident Range	
Peyto	2,980	9,780	Waputik Range	
Pharaoh	2,713	8,901	Park Ranges	
Phillips	3,246	10,650	Park Ranges	Named for a Jasper area outfitter and guide
Pigeon	2,394	7,854	Kananaskis Range	Named for pigeons seen near summit
Piggy Plus	2,760	9,060	Spray Mountains	
Pika	3,053	10,016	Slate Range	
Pilkington	3,285	10,778	Park Ranges	Named for a British mountaineer
Pilot	2,935	9,629	Massive Range	
Pinnacle	3,070	10,070	Bow Range	
Pocaterra	2,941	9,649	Elk Range	
Poilus	3,166	10,387	Waputik Range	
Popes	3,163	10,377	Bow Range	Named for a Canadian politician
Portal	2,926	9,600	Waputik Mountains	
Potts	3,002	9,849	Opal Range	
Prairie	2,214	7,264		
Princess Margaret	2,515	8,251	Fairholme Range	
Prior	3,276	10,748	Park Ranges	Named for a Lt-Governor of B.C.
Protection	2,972	9,751	Sawback Range	
Prow	2,858	9,377	Vermilion Range	
Ptarmigan	3,035	9,957	Slate Range	
Ptolemy	2,815	9,236	Flathead Range	Highest in the range
Pulpit	2,720	8,920	Waputik Range	
Puma	3,120	10,240	Palliser Range	
Putnik	2,940	9,650	Kananaskis Range	
Pyramid	2,766	9,075	Victoria Cross Ranges	
Pyriform	2,621	8,599	Highwood Range	
Quadra	3,173	10,410	Bow Range	Named for its four peaks
Quartz	2,580	8,460	Park Ranges	Top composed mainly of quartz
Queen Elizabeth	2,850	9,350	Park Ranges	Named for Queen Elisabeth of Belgium
Quincy	3,150	10,330	Park Ranges	
Rae	3,218	10,558	Misty Range	
Red Man	2,905	9,531	Blue Range	
Redoubt	2,902	9,521	Slate Range	
Redoubt	3,109	10,200	Park Ranges	Name for its appearance to a redoubt
Remus	2,688	8,819	Fisher Range	
Resolute	3,150	10,330	Front Range	Lion and Lioness
Revenant	3,065	10,056	Palliser Range	
Rhondda	3,062	10,046	Waputik Mountains	Named for a Welsh politician
Ribbon	2,880	9,450	Kananaskis Range	
Richards	2,377	7,799	Clark Range	
Richardson	3,086	10,125	Slate Range	
Ringrose	3,292	10,801	Bow Range	
Robertson	3,177	10,423	Spray Mountains	
Roche à Bosche	2123	6965	Bosche Range	
Roche à Perdrix	2135	7002	Fiddle Range	
Roche Bonhomme	2500	8200	Colin Range	
Roche Jacques	2603	8540	Jacques Range	
Roche Miette	2316	7598	Miette Range	
Roche Noire	2920	9580	Trident Range	
Roche Ronde	2138	7014	Bosche Range	
Roche de Smet	2539	8330	De Smet Range	
Romulus	2832	9291	Fisher Range	
Rose	2515	8251		
Rundle	2,948	9,672	South Banff Range	Named for a missionary
Rutherford	2,847	9,341	Northern Front Ranges	Named for Alberta's first premier
Saddle	2,433	7,982	Bow Range	
Saint Nicholas	2,938	9,639	Waputik Mountains	
Samson	3,081	10,108	Queen Elizabeth Ranges	Named for an Indigenous guide
Sarbach	3,155	10,351	Waputik Mountains	Named for a Swiss mountain guide
Sarrail	3,170	10,400	Park Ranges	Named for a general of the French army
Saskatchewan	3,342	10,965	Columbia Icefield	Named for Saskatchewan River
Scarab	2,918	9,573	Park Ranges	Named for scarabs of Ancient Egypt
Scarp	3,000	9,800	Park Ranges	
Scarpe	2,591	8,501	Clark Range	Named for river in France
Scott	3,300	10,800	Park Ranges	Named for Captain Robert Falcon Scott
Sentinel	2,373	7,785	Livingstone Range	
Sentry	2,435	7,989	Flathead Range	
Seven Sisters	2,591	8,501	High Rock Range	
Shark	2,786	9,140	Spray Mountains	Named for British destroyer sunk during WWI
Siffleur	3,129	10,266	Murchison Group	
Sirdar	2,804	9,199	Colin Range	
Signal	2,312	7,585	Maligne Range	
Silverhorn	2,911	9,551	Murchison Group	
Simon	3,322	10,899	Park Ranges	Named for explorer Simon Fraser
Sir Douglas	3,406	11,175	Park Ranges	Named for a British Army officer
Skogan	2,662	8,734	Kananaskis Range	
Skoki	2707	8882	Slate Range	
Smith Dorrien	3151	10338	Spray Mountains	
Smuts	2938	9639	Spray Mountains	
Smythe	3,246	10,650	Winston Churchill Range	Named for an English mountaineer
Snaring	2931	9617	Victoria Cross Ranges	
Snow Dome	3,456	11,339	Winston Churchill Range	On the Continental Divide
Snow Peak	2800	9187		On the Continental Divide
Sofa Mountain	2515	8251	Lewis Range	
South Ghost	2700	8858		
South Twin	3566	11700	Winston Churchill Range	Part of the Twin Peaks massif
Sparrowhawk	3,121	10,240	Kananaskis Range	Named for a British destroyer sunk in WWI
Spring-Rice	3,275	10,745	Park Ranges	Named for a British diplomat
St. Bride	3,312	10,866	Sawback Range	Sawback's high point
St. Piran	2,649	8,691	Bow Range	
Stairway	2,999	9,839	Waputik Mountains	Named for rock formations resembling a stairway
Stenton	2815	9236	Fairholme Range	
Stewart	3312	10866	Cloister Mountains	Highest point in range
Stoney Squaw	1868	6129	Vermilion Range	
Storm	3,095	10,154	Misty Range	
Storm (Banff/Kootenay)	3158	10361	Ball Range	
Strachan	2,682	8,799	High Rock Range	Named for Canadian army officer, recipient of the VC
Storelk	2,871	9,419	Elk Range	On the Continental Divide
Stutfield	3,450	11,320	Winston Churchill Range	
Sulphur	2,451	8,041	South Banff Range	A gondola runs to the peak
Sundance	2,902	9,521	Sundance Range	
Sunwapta	3,315	10,876	Queen Elizabeth Ranges	
Survey	2,667	8,750	Central Icefields	
Synge	2,972	9,751	Waputik Mountains	Named for a British army officer
Talbot	2,373	7,785	Front Ranges	Named for a Canadian politician
Tangle Ridge	3,001	9,846	Canadian Rockies	
Tatei Ridge	2,911	9,551	Rainbow Range	Tatei is the Stoney Indian word for "wind"
Tecumseh	2,547	8,356	High Rock Range	
Tekarra	2,694	8,839	Maligne Range	
Temple	3,543	11,624	Bow Range	
Tent	2,210	7,250	Flathead Range	
Terminal	2,835	9,301	Trident Range	
Terrapin	2,954	9,692	Park Ranges	On the Continental Divide
Thompson	3,089	10,135	Waputik Mountains	
Thorington Tower	3,155	10,351	Winston Churchill Range	
Three Sisters	2,936	9,633	South Banff Range	
Threepoint	2,595	8,514		
Throne	3,120	10,240	South Jasper Ranges	
Titkana Peak	2,827	9,275	Rainbow Range	Titkana is the Stoney Indian word for "bird"
Tombstone	3,029	9,938	Opal Range	
Tonquin	2,396	7,861	South Jasper Ranges	
Tonsa	3,053	10,016	Bow Range	Stoney Indian word for the number four
Tornado	3,090	10,140	High Rock Range	Named in 1915
The Tower	3,117	10,226	Kananaskis Range	
The Towers	2,842	9,324	Park Ranges	On the Continental Divide
Townsend	2,820	9,250	Front Ranges	Named for British pilot romantically involved with Princess Margaret
Trapper	2,988	9,803	Wapta Icefield	Named in 1892
Treadmill	2,716	8,911	Front Ranges	Named for similarity to a treadmill
Tunnel	1,692	5,551	Bow Valley	Mountain encircled by the town of Banff
Triad	3,048	10,000	Park Ranges	Named in 1936
Trutch	3,258	10,689	Park Ranges	Named for first Lieutenant Governor of B.C.
Turbulent	2,850	9,350	Sundance Range	
Turner	2,806	9,206	Blue Range	
The Turret	2,580	8,460	Park Ranges	
Turtle	2,210	7,250	Blairmore Range	1903 Frank Slide
Tuzo	3,246	10,650	Canadian Rockies	Part of the Valley of the Ten Peaks
Tyrwhitt	2,874	9,429	Elk Range	Named for a British admiral
Unwin	3,268	10,722	Queen Elizabeth Ranges	FA 1908 Sidney Unwin
Upright Mountain	2,978	9,770	Front Ranges	FA 1911
Utopia	2,563	8,409	Miette Range	Named in 1916
Victoria	3,464	11,365	Bow Range	Named for Queen Victoria
Vimy	2,385	7,825	Lewis Range	Named for Canadian victory in the Battle of Vimy Ridge
Vista	2,795	9,170	Park Ranges	Named for its views at the top
Waitabit	3,090	10,140	Park Ranges	Named for Waitabit Creek
Wales	3,109	10,200	Park Ranges	Named for a British astronomer
Walter	3,401	11,158	Park Ranges	Fourth highest subpeak of Mt. Lyell (3498 m)
Wapta	2,782	9,127	Waputik Range	Wapta means "river" in the Stoney language
Waputik	2,736	8,976	Waputik Range	Waputik means "white goat" in the Stoney language
Warren	3,362	11,030	Park Ranges	Backdrop of Maligne Lake, Jasper National Park
Warrior	2,973	9,754	Park Ranges	Named for a British warship heavily damaged in the Battle of Jutland
Warspite	2,850	9,350	Spray Mountains	Named for a British warship that served in WW I and II
Warwick	2,906	9,534	Clemenceau Icefield	
Wasootch	2,330	7,640	Fisher Range	
Watchman	3,009	9,872	Park Ranges	FA 1918
Watchtower	2,791	9,157	Maligne Range	
Watermelon	3,095	10,154	Front Ranges	Banff NP
Wedge	2,665	8,743	Kananaskis Range	
Weed	3,080	10,100	Murchison Group	Named in 1902 for George Weed
Weiss	3,090	10,140	Winston Churchill Range	
Whistlers	2,470	8,100	Trident Range	
Whistling Rock	2,971	9,747		
White Man	2,967	9,734	Blue Range	
White Pyramid	3,219	10,561	Waputik Mountains	Banff NP
Whiteaves	3,145	10,318	Park Ranges	Named for a British palaeontologist
Whitecrow	2,881	9,452	Park Ranges	Named for white crows seen on peak by FA party
Whitehorn	2,637	8,652	Slate Range	
Whiteshield	2,684	8,806	Park Ranges	Named for snow and ice on eastern side
Whyte	2,983	9,787	Bow Range	
Wilcox	2,884	9,462	Columbia Icefield	
William Booth	2,728	8,950	Ram Range	
Wilson	3,260	10,700	Park Ranges	
Wind	3,153	10,344	Kananaskis Range	
Windtower	2,697	8,848		
Wintour	2,700	8,900	Opal Range	
Wonder	2,850	9,350	Park Ranges	On the Continental Divide
Woolley	3,405	11,171	Winston Churchill Range	
Worthington	2,915	9,564	Spray Range	Named for Canadian army officer killed in WW II
Xerxes	2,970	9,740	Park Ranges	Name is not official
Yellowhead	2,458	8,064	Victoria Cross Ranges	
Younghusband	3,170	10,400	Chaba Icefield	Named for a British army officer

== Highest peaks ==
1. Mount Columbia – 3,747 m (12,293 ft)
2. Twin Peaks massif – 3,684 m (12,087 ft)
3. Mount Alberta – 3,619 m (11,873 ft)
4. Mount Assiniboine – 3,616 m (11,864 ft)
5. Mount Forbes – 3,612 m (11,850 ft)
6. Mount Temple – 3,543 m (11,624 ft)
7. Mount Brazeau – 3,525 m (11,565 ft)
8. Snow Dome – 3,520 m (11,549 ft)
9. Mount Kitchener – 3,505 m (11,499 ft)
10. Mount Lyell – 3,504 m (11,496 ft)

== List of ranges ==
- Bare Range
- Blairmore Range
- Blue Range
- Bosche Range
- Brazeau Range
- Caribou Mountains
- Clark Range (Border Ranges)
- Colin Range
- Elk Range
- Fairholme Range
- Fiddle Range
- Fisher Range
- High Rock Range
- Highwood Range
- Jacques Range
- Kananaskis Range
- Livingstone Range
- Maligne Range
- Massive Range
- Miette Range
- Misty Range
- Opal Range
- Palliser Range
- President Range
- Queen Elizabeth Ranges
- Ram Range
- Sawback Range
- Slate Range
- De Smet Range
- Spray Mountains
- Valley of the Ten Peaks
- Vermilion Range
- Victoria Cross Ranges
- Waputik Range
- Winston Churchill Range

== List of passes ==
The Rockies are crossed through east–west alpine passes, such as:

- Abbot Pass
- Crowsnest Pass
- Kicking Horse Pass
- Kiwetinok Pass
- Sunwapta Pass
- Weary Creek Gap
- Yellowhead Pass

== See also ==
- Geography of Alberta
- List of mountains of Canada
- Mountain peaks of Canada
- List of mountain peaks of North America
- List of mountain peaks of the Rocky Mountains
- Rocky Mountains

== Gallery ==
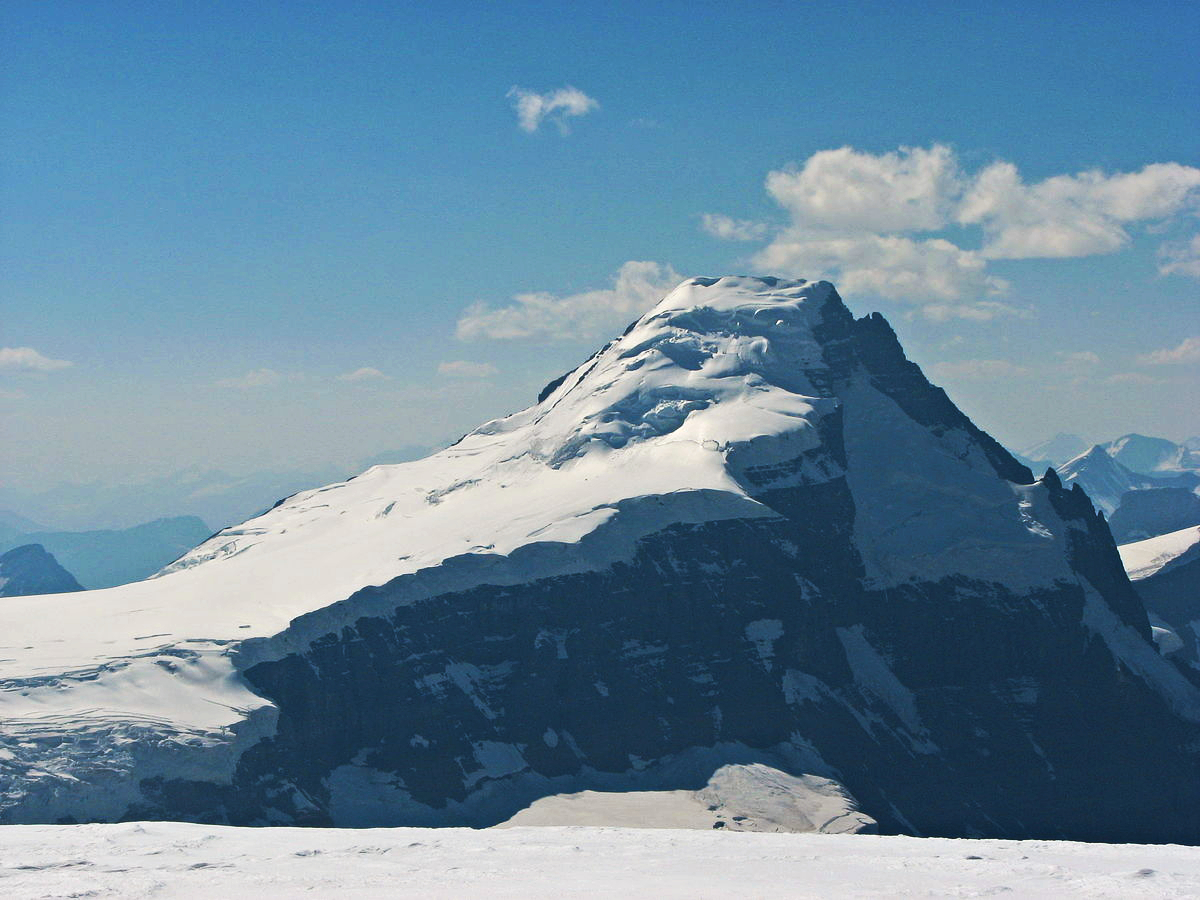
Mount Columbia, highest point in Alberta

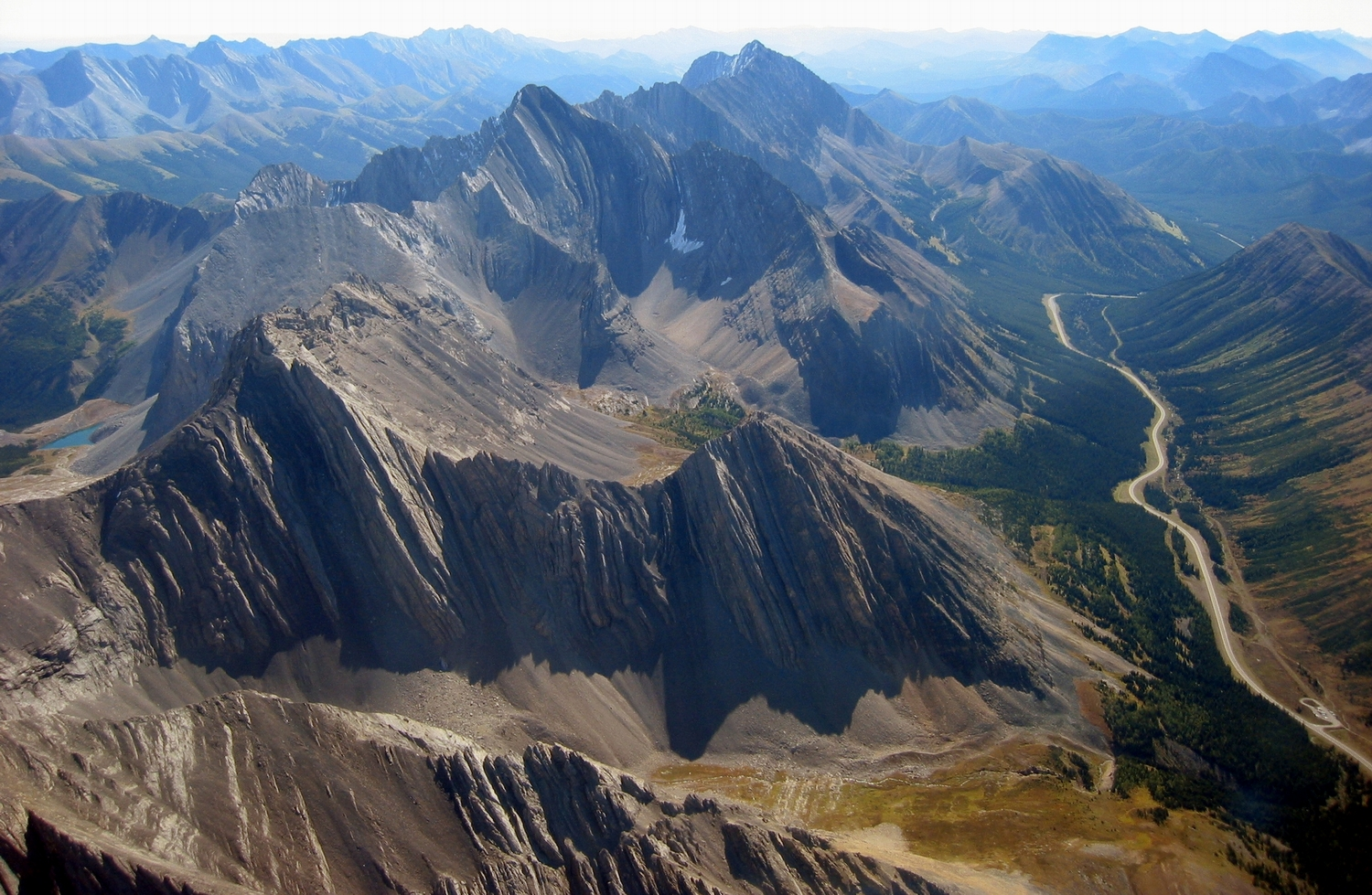
Mount Arethusa

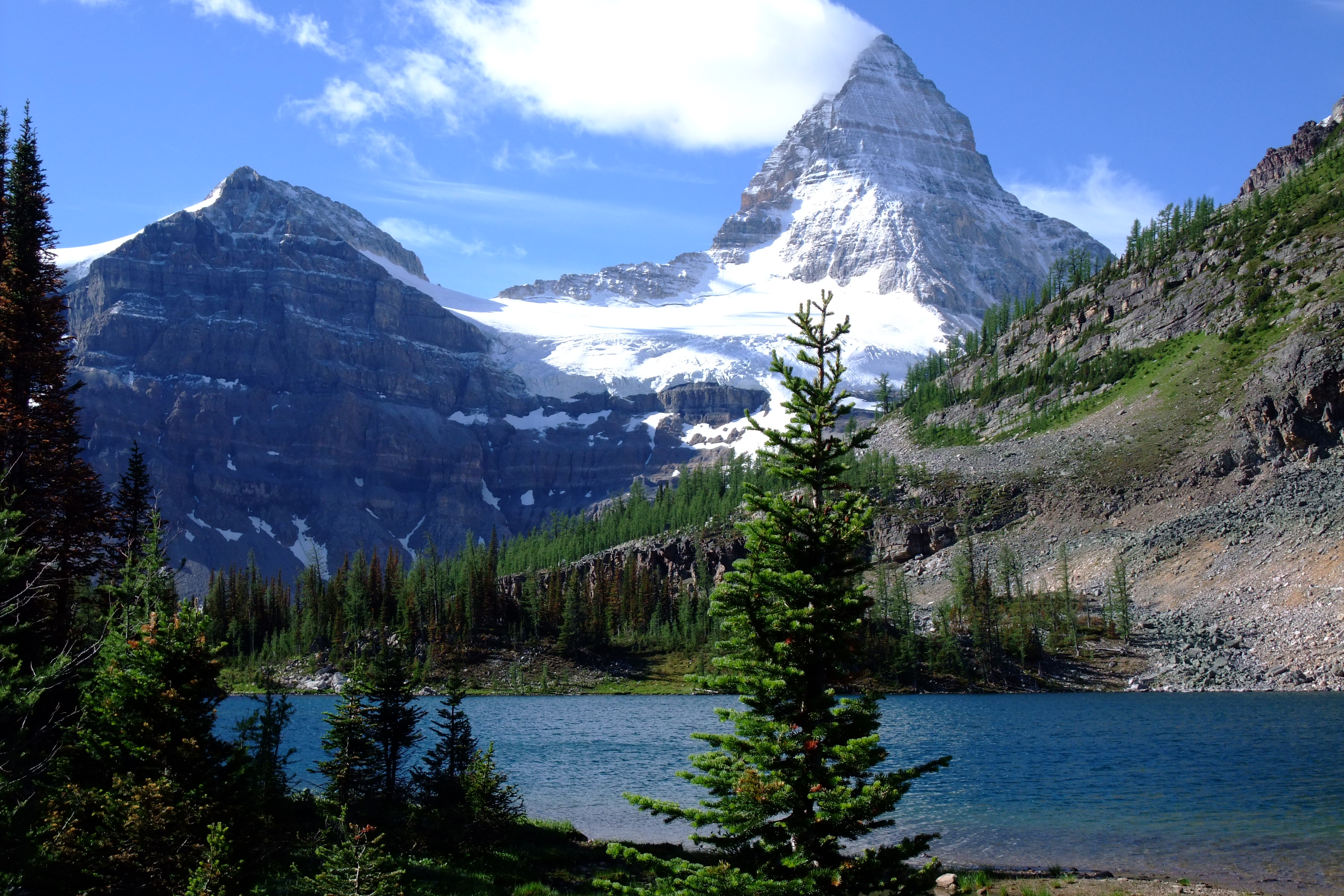
Mount Assiniboine

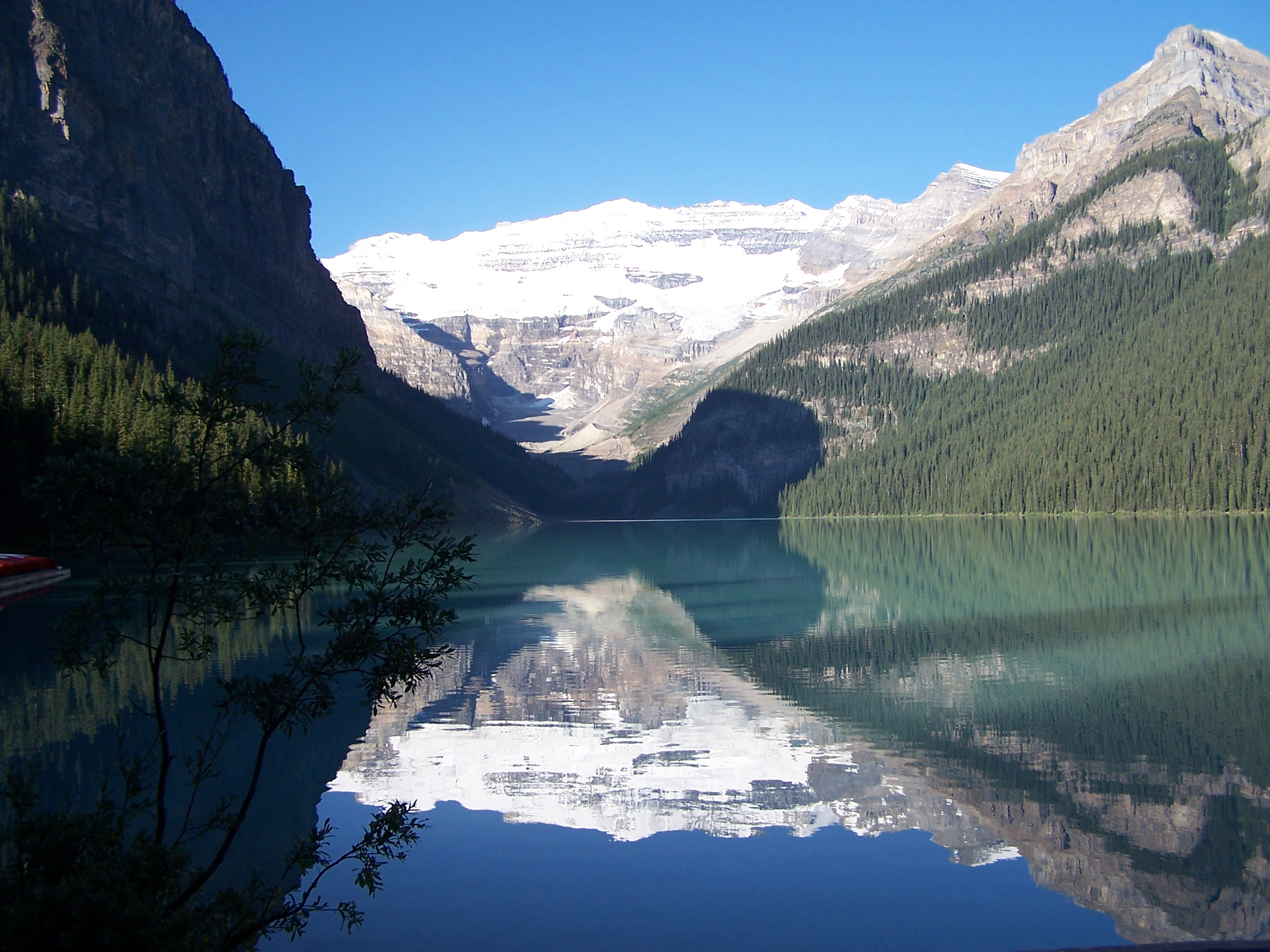
View from Lake Louise with Bow Range

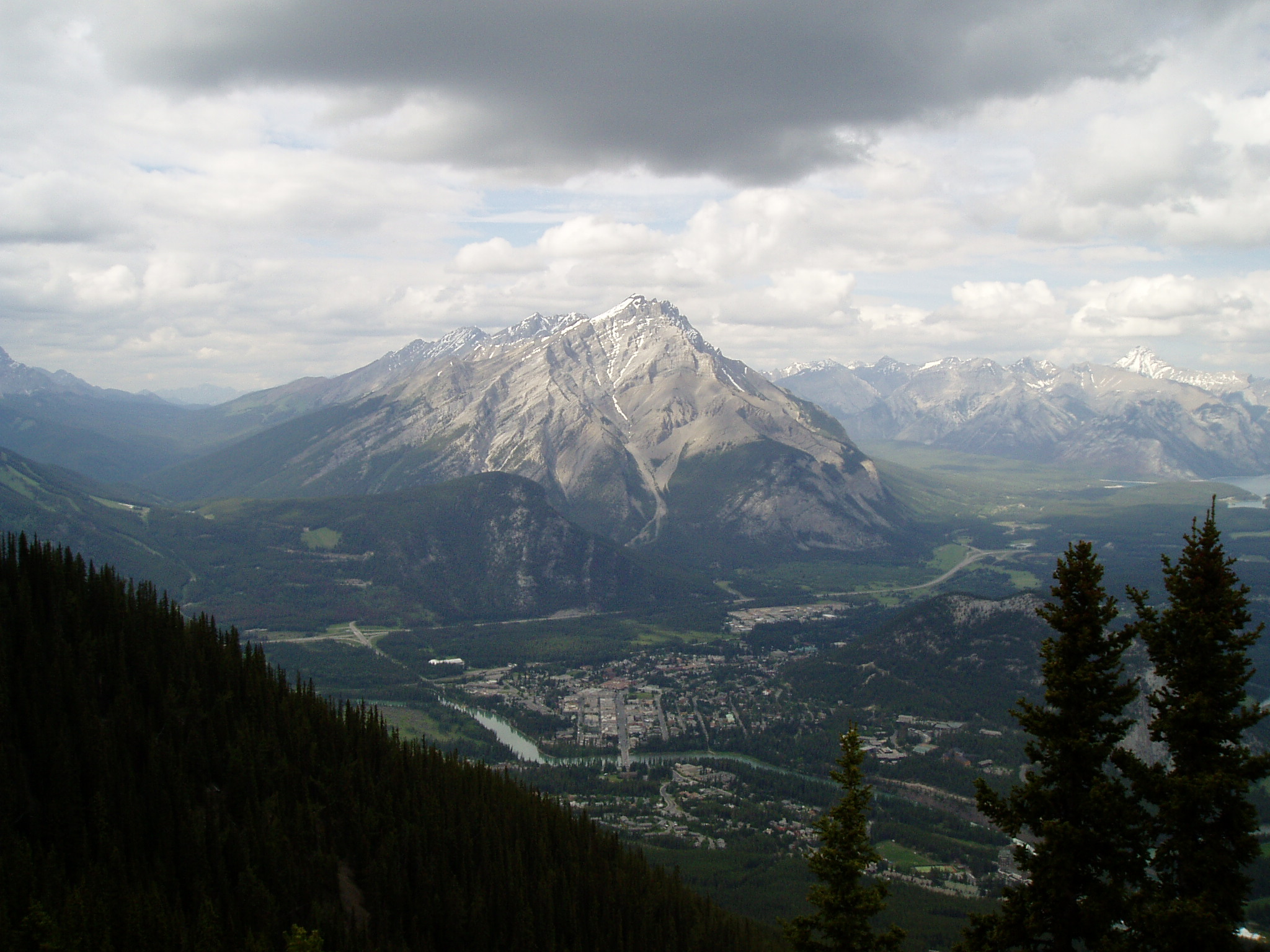
Cascade Mountain

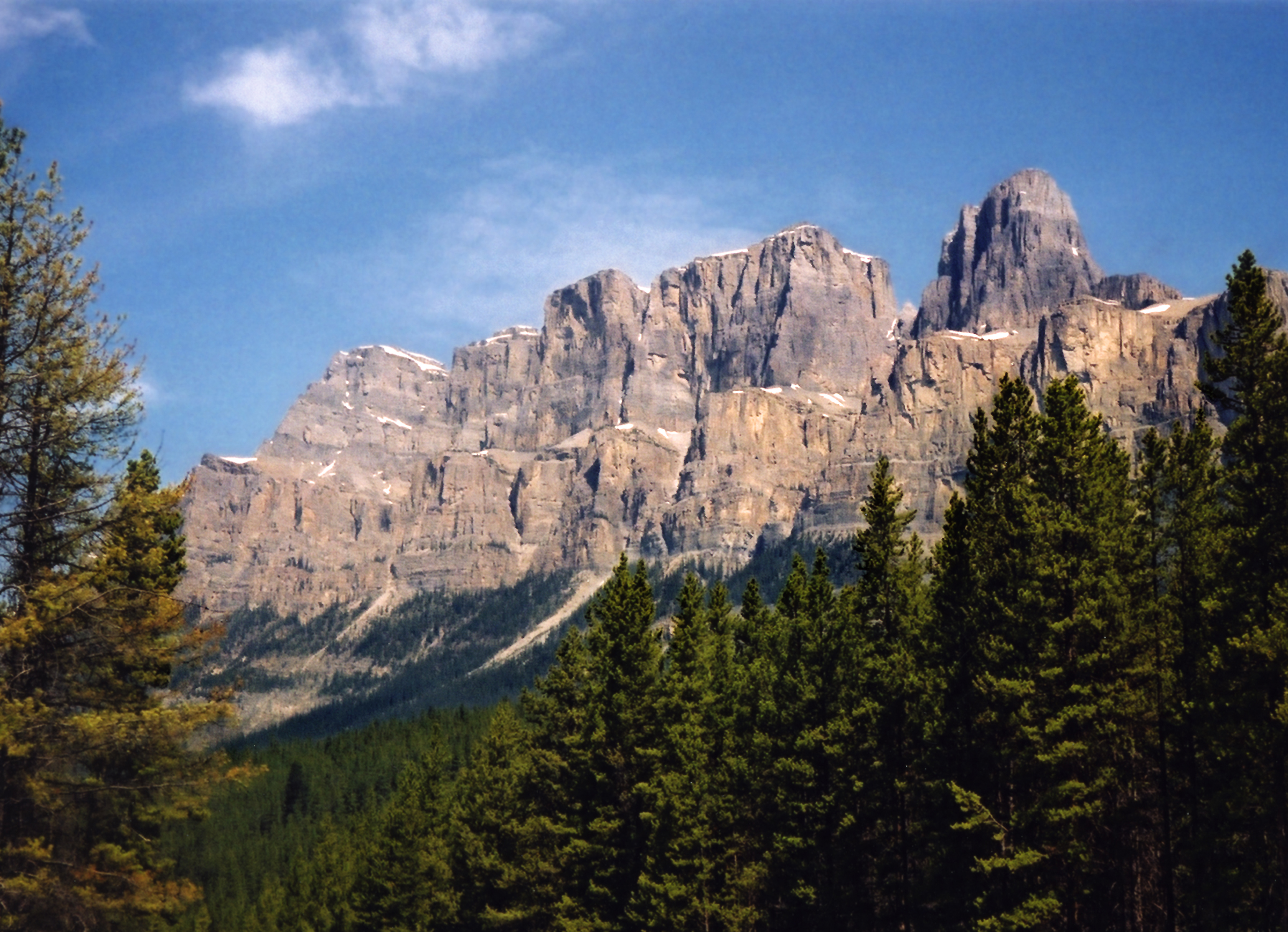
Castle Mountain

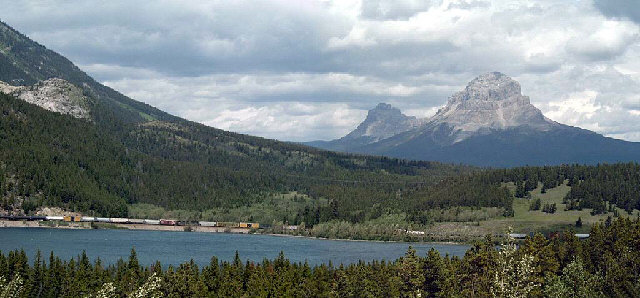
Crownest Mountain

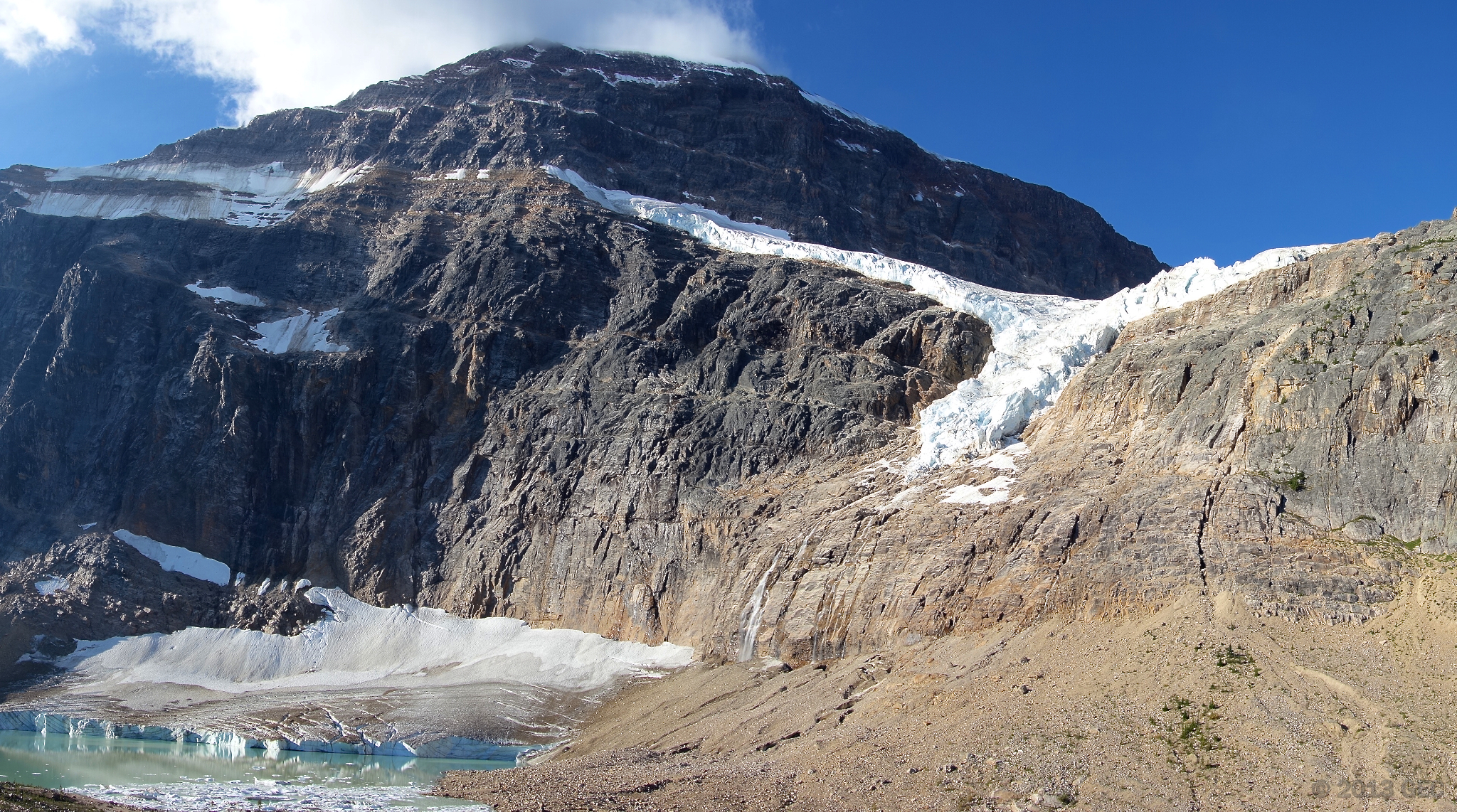
Mount Edith Cavell

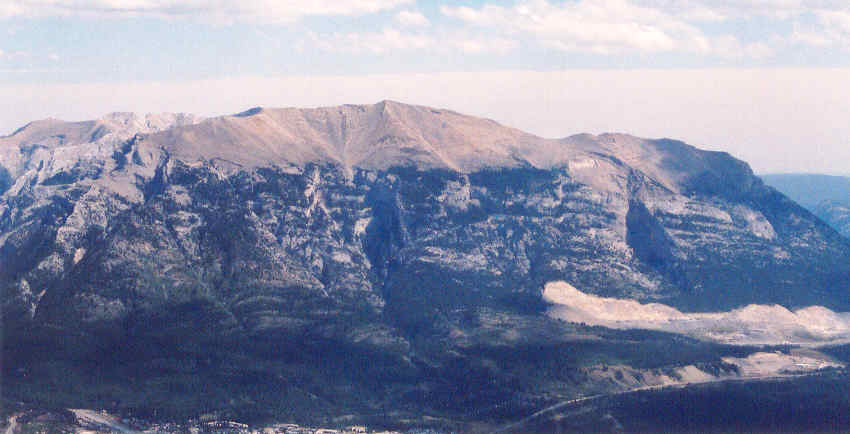
Grotto Mountain

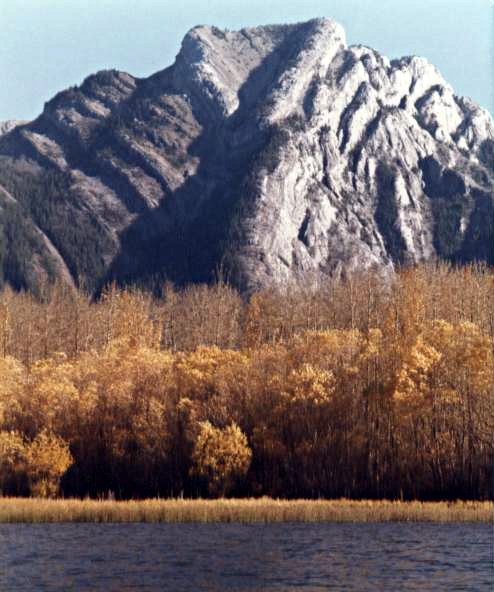
Heart Mountain

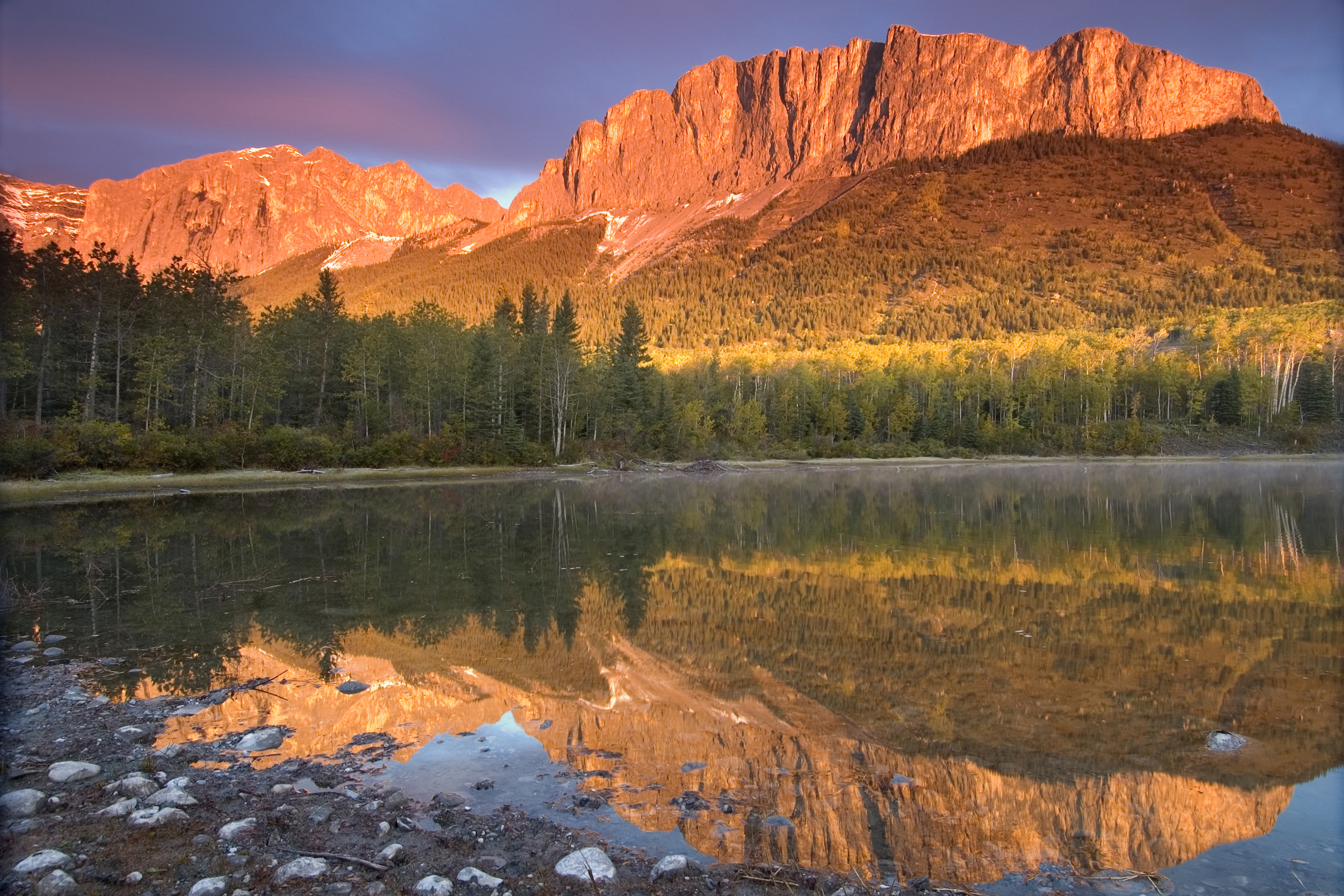
Mount John Laurie (Yamnuska)

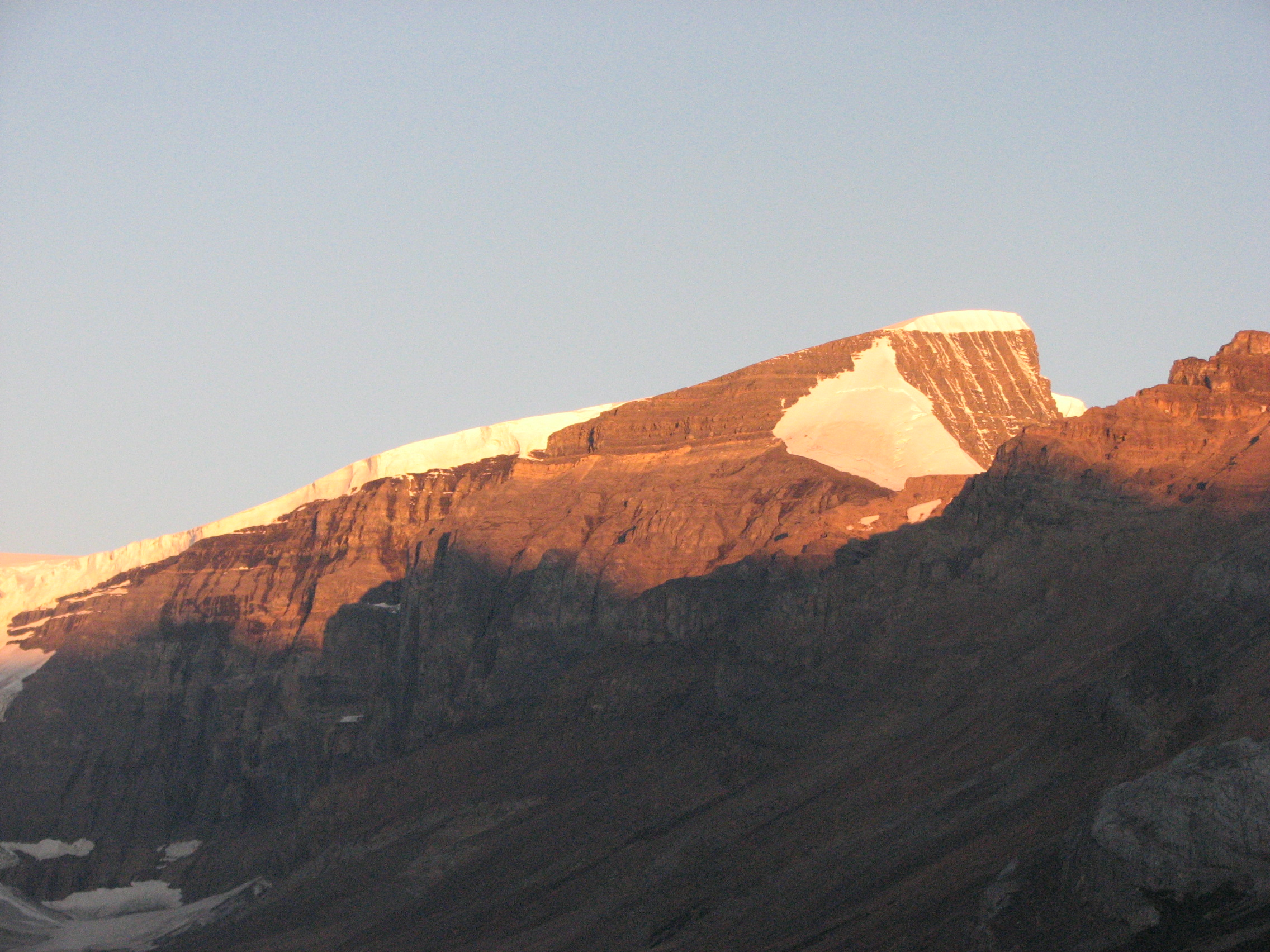
Mount Kitchener

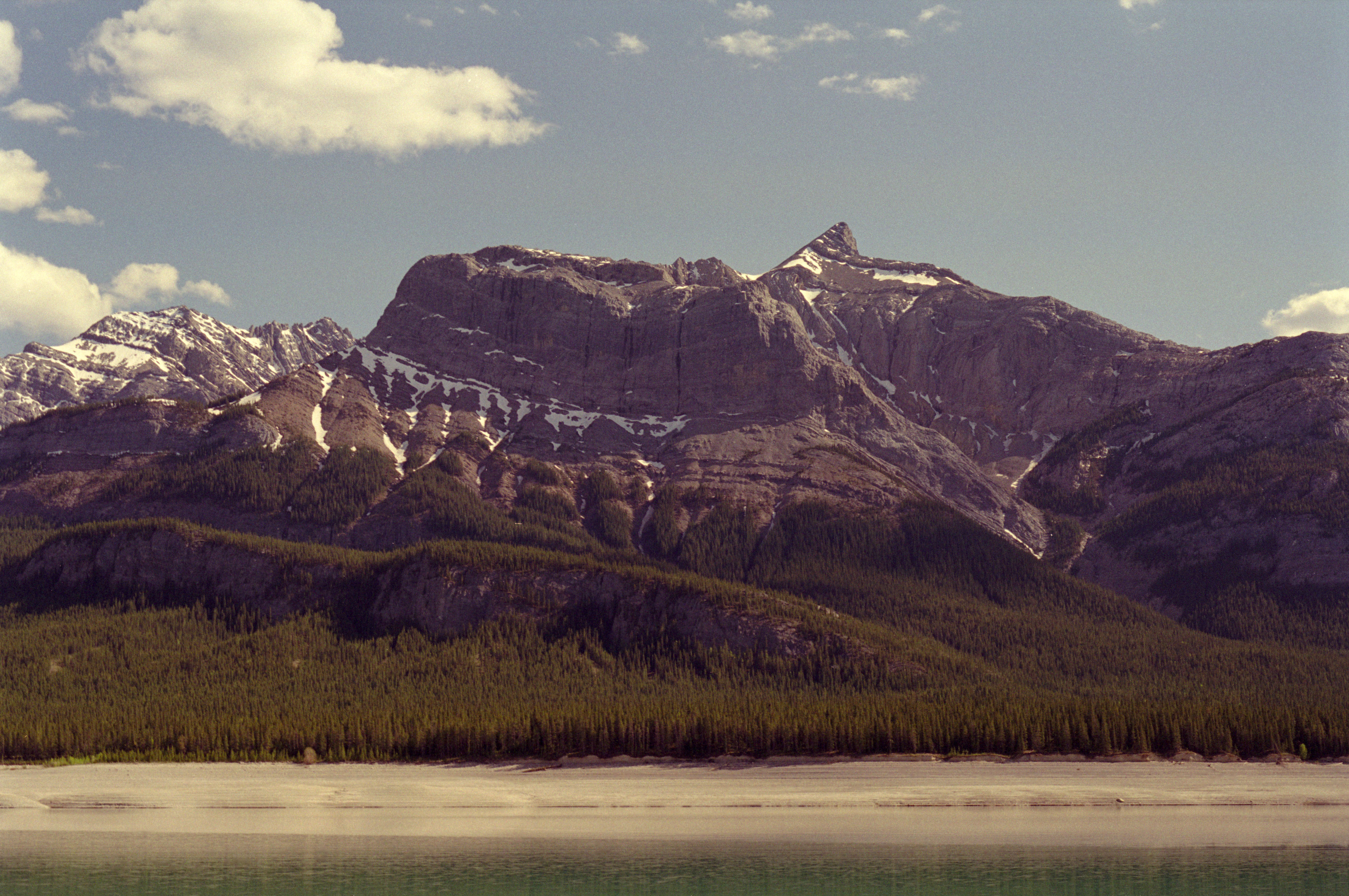
Mount Michener

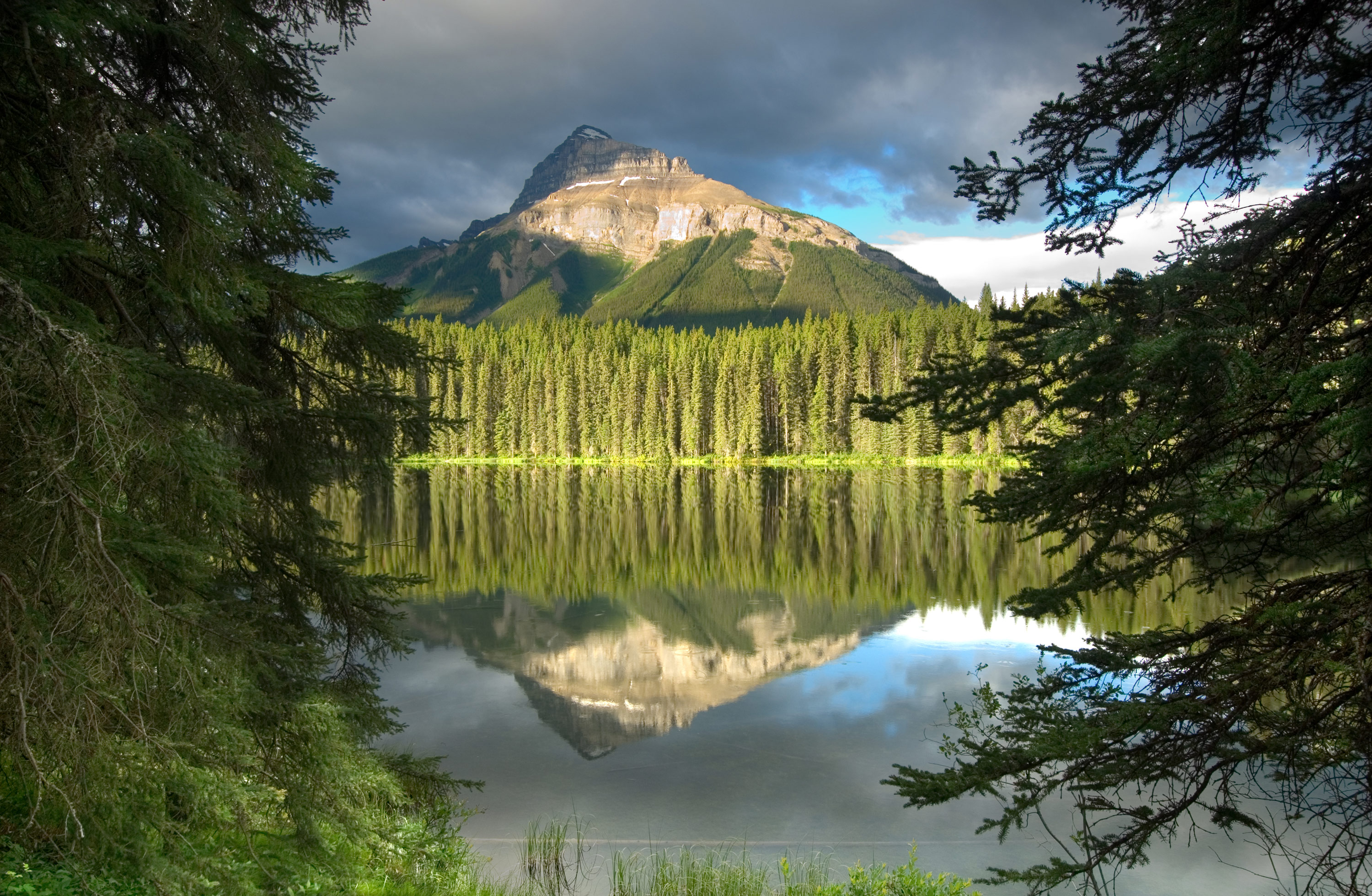
Pilot Mountain

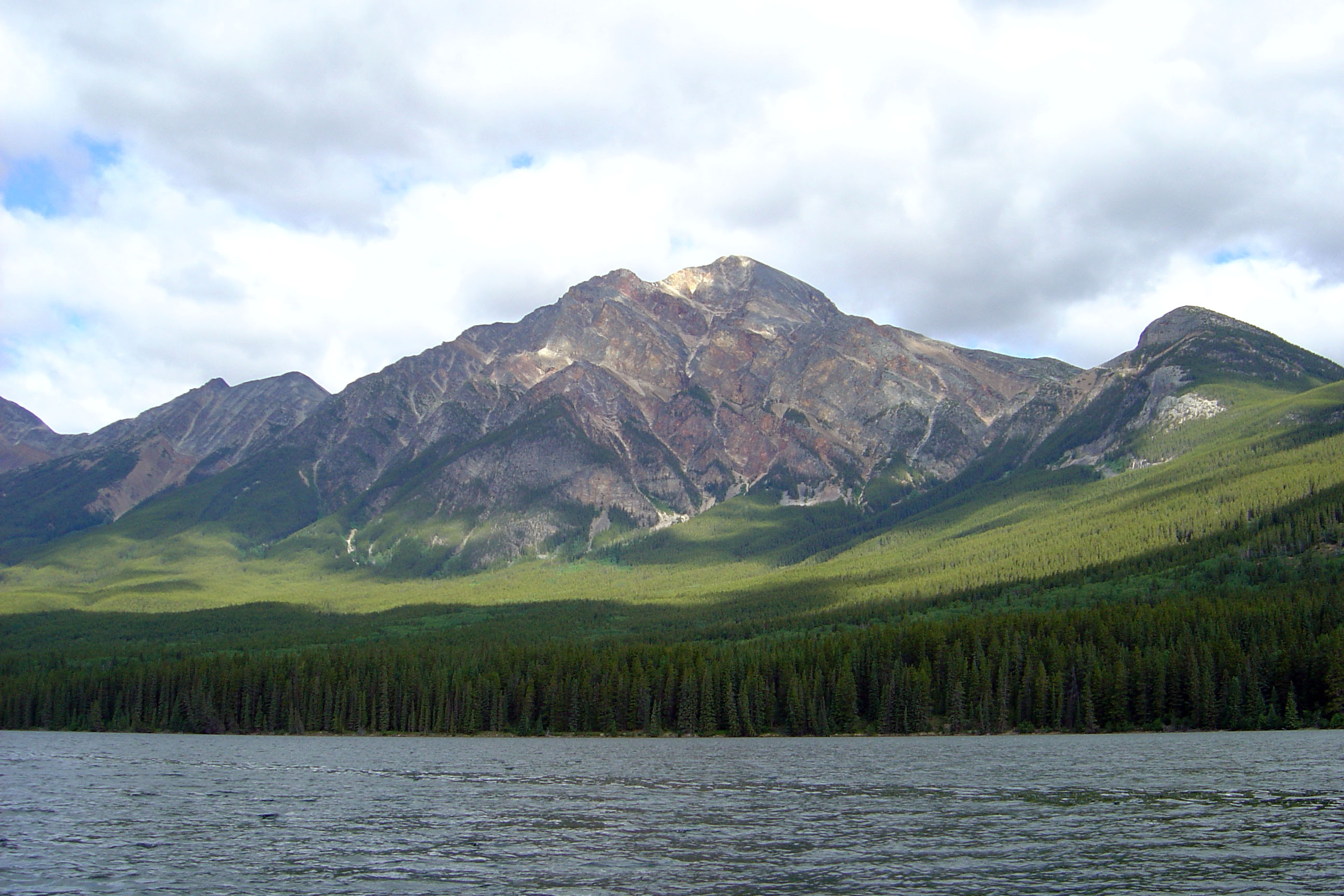
Pyramid Mountain

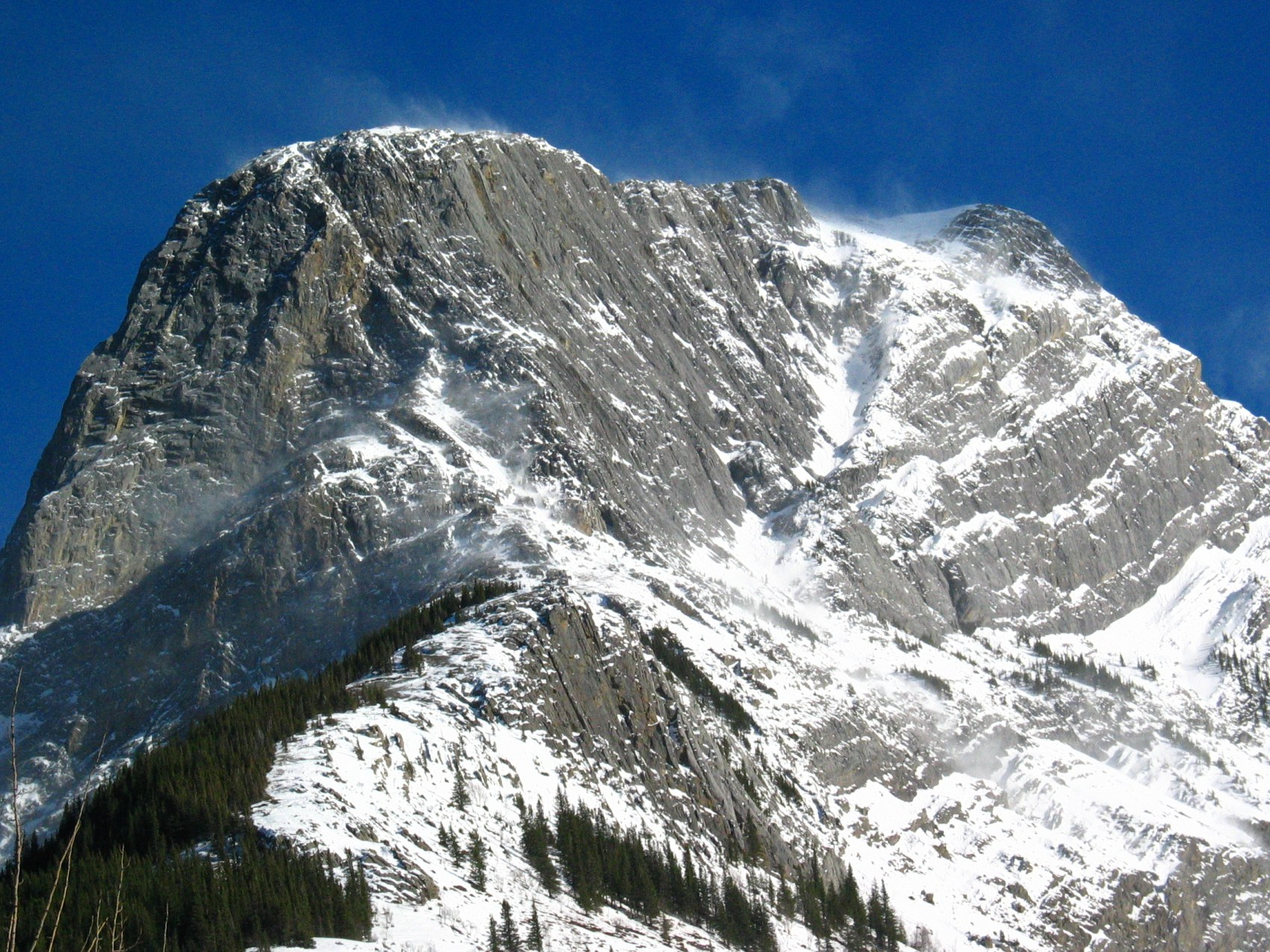
Roche à Perdrix

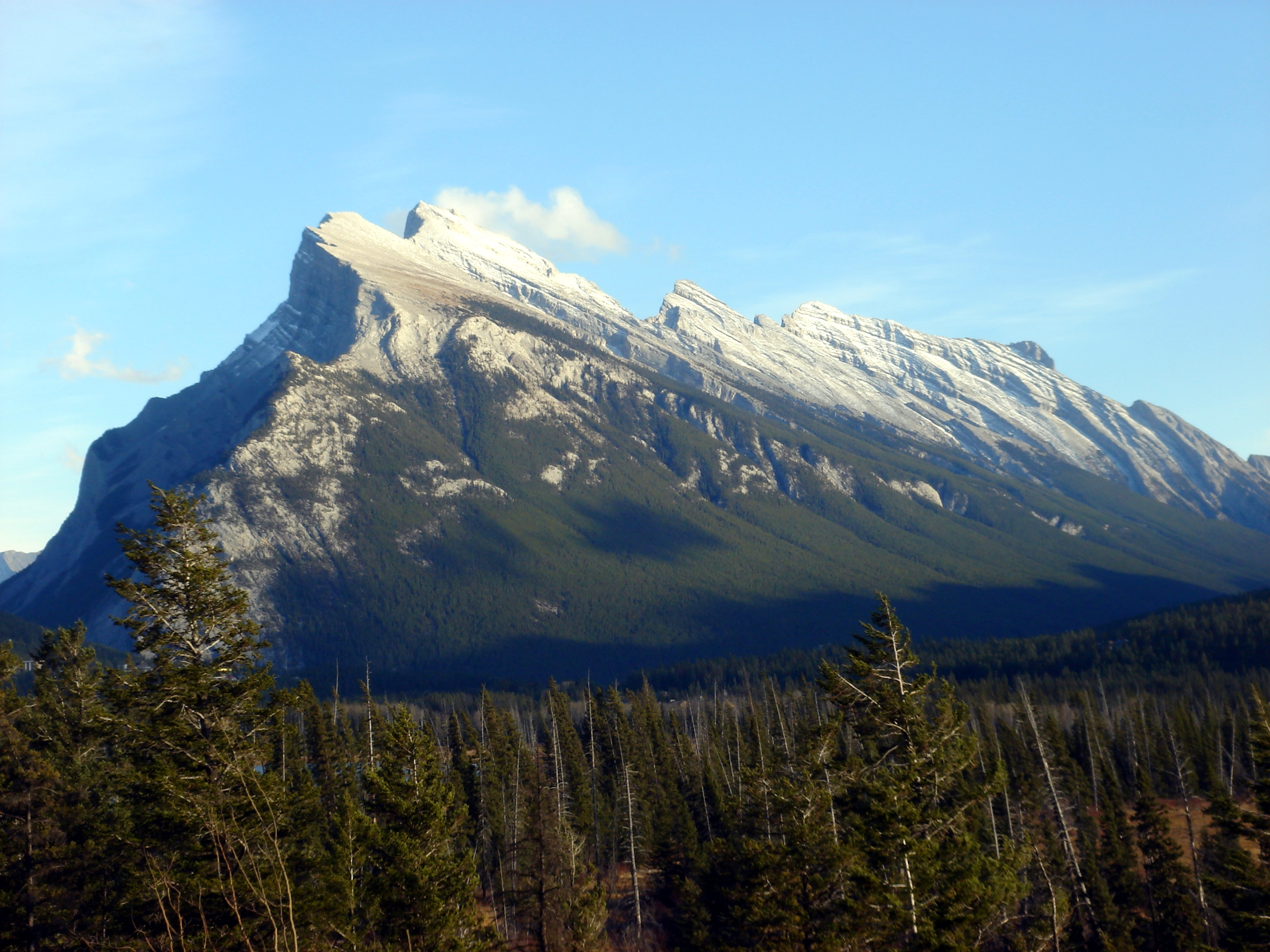
Mount Rundle

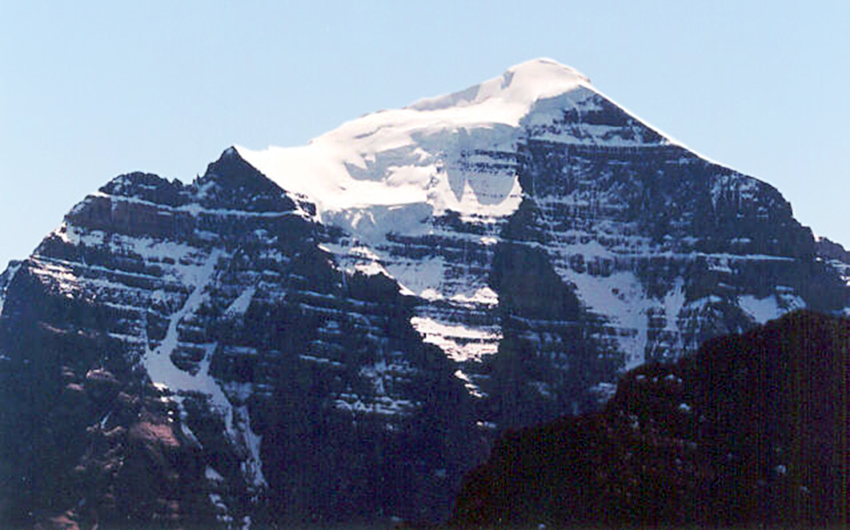
Mount Temple

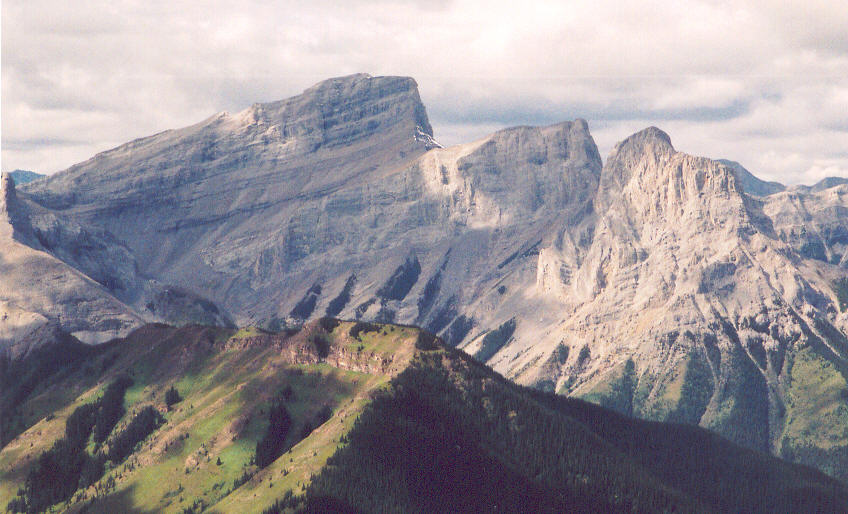
Three Sisters

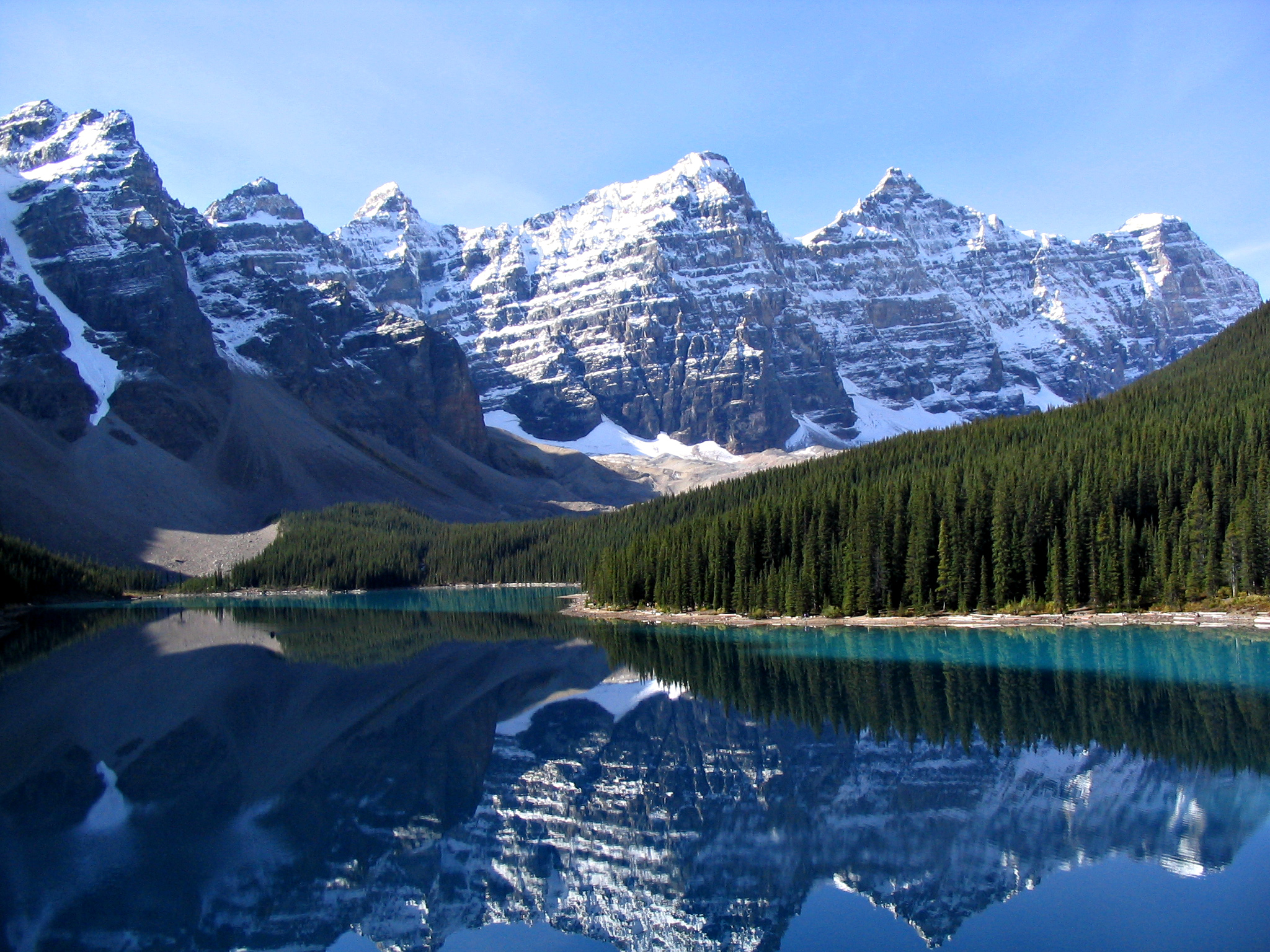
Valley of the Ten Peaks

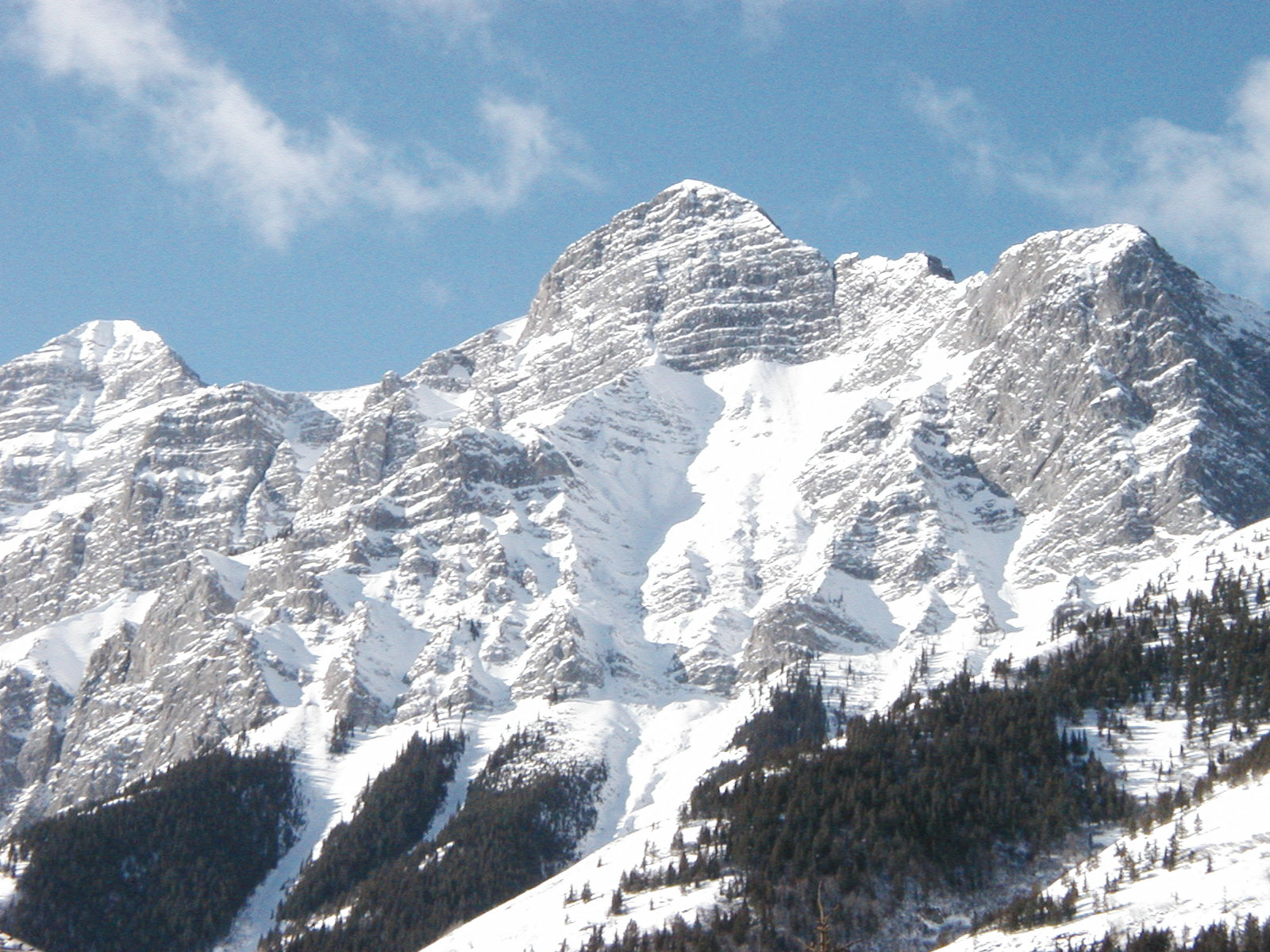
Kananaskis Range, Mount Kidd

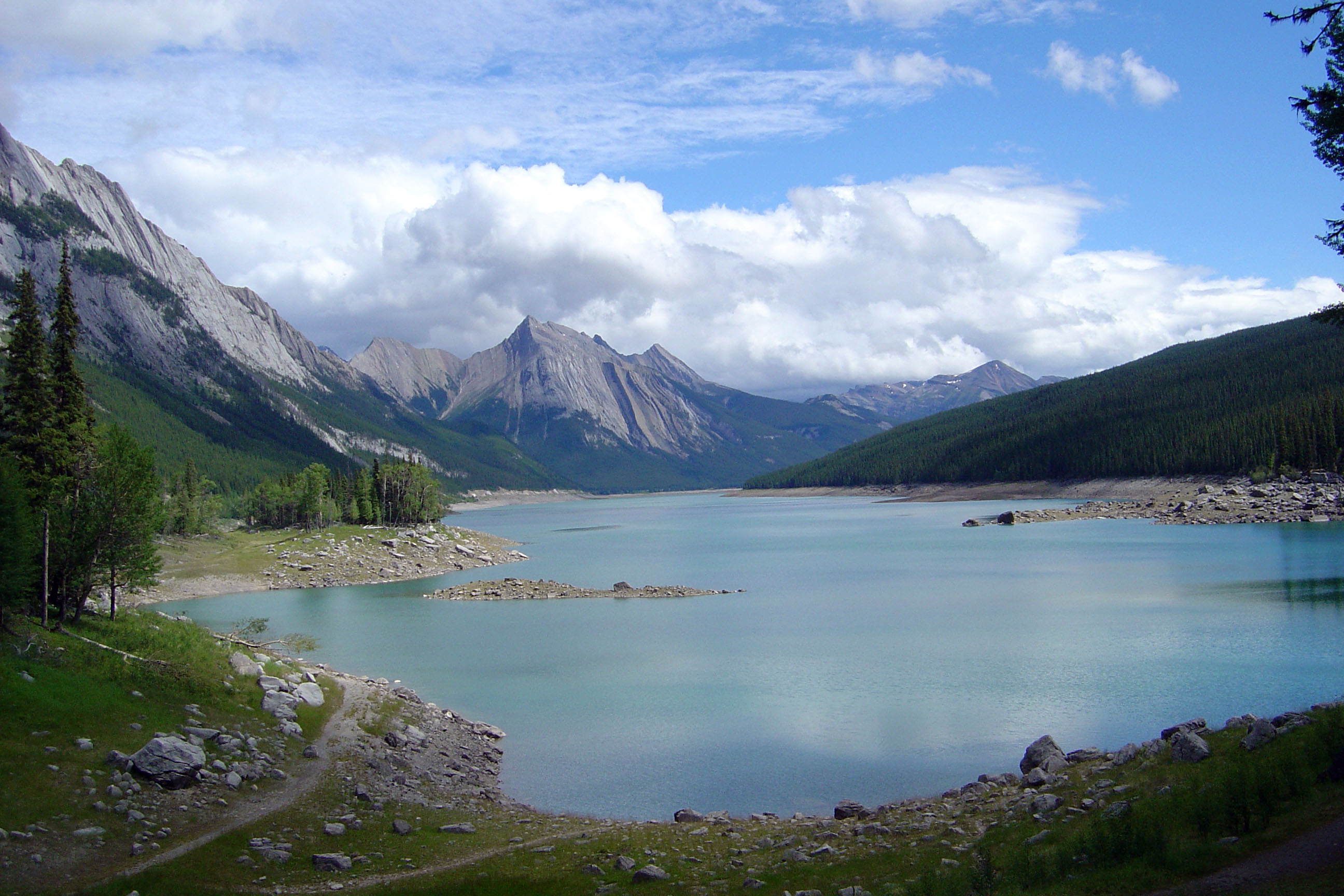
View from Medicine Lake

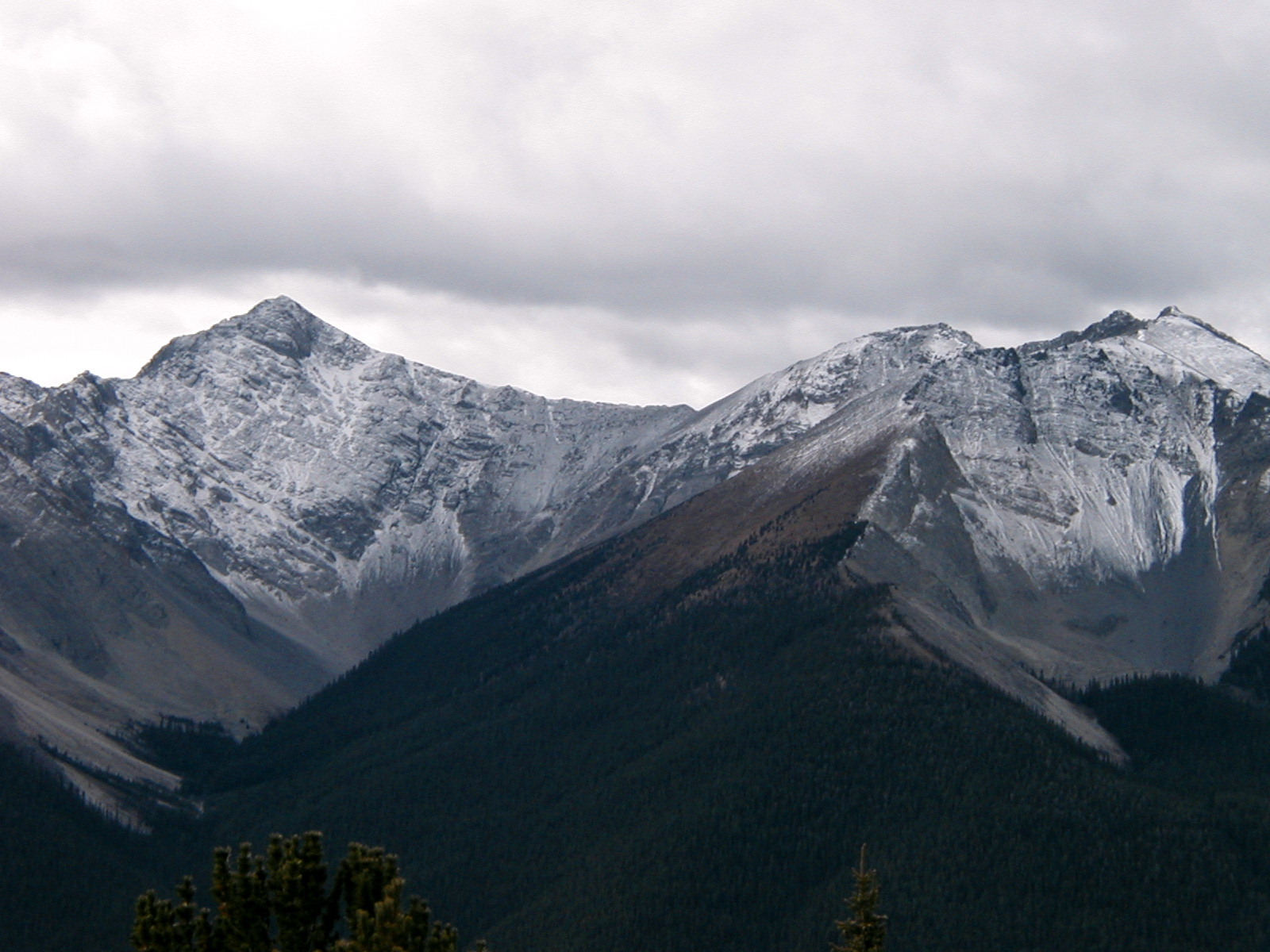
View from Sulphur Mountain

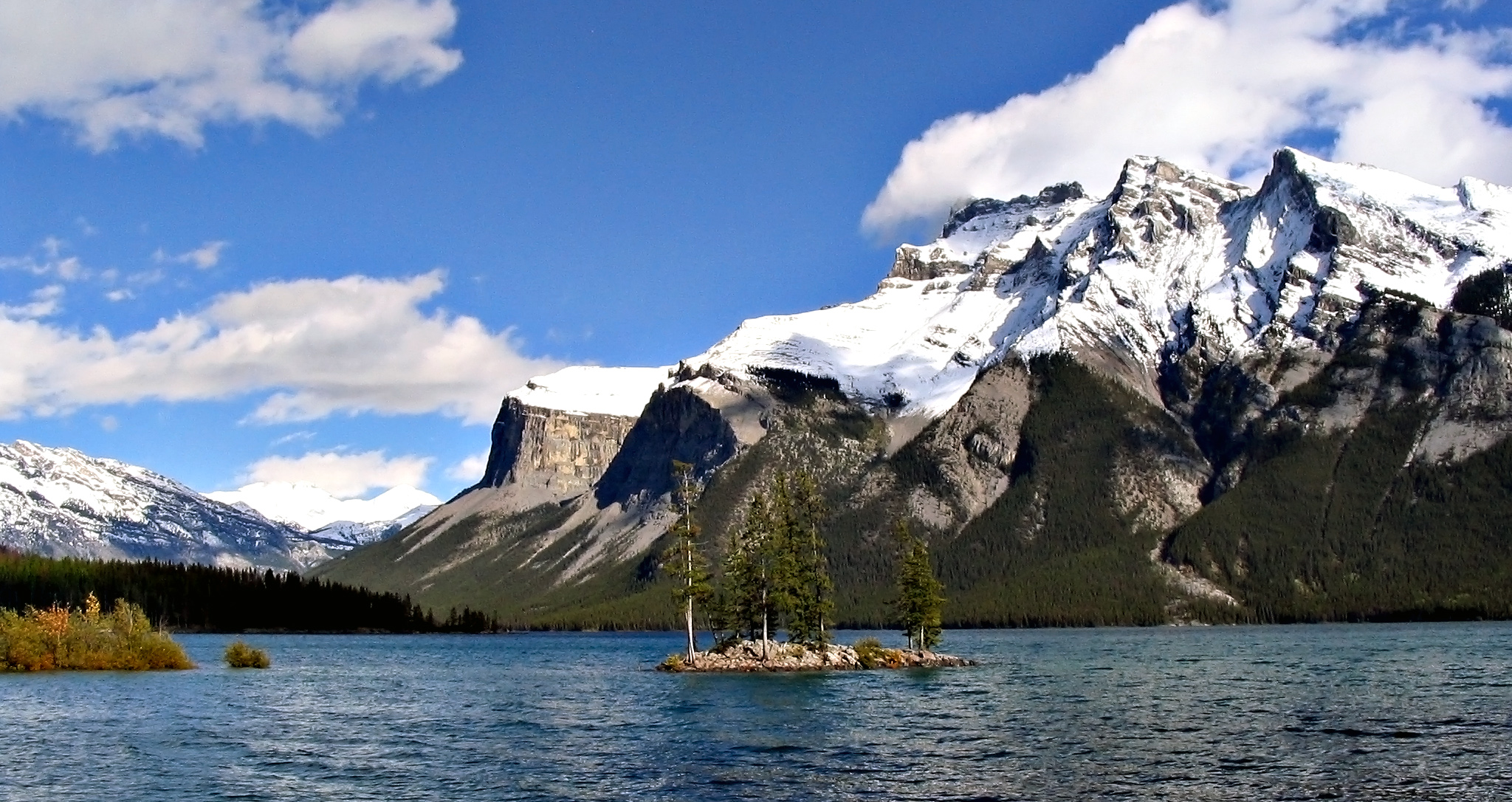
View from Lake Minnewanka

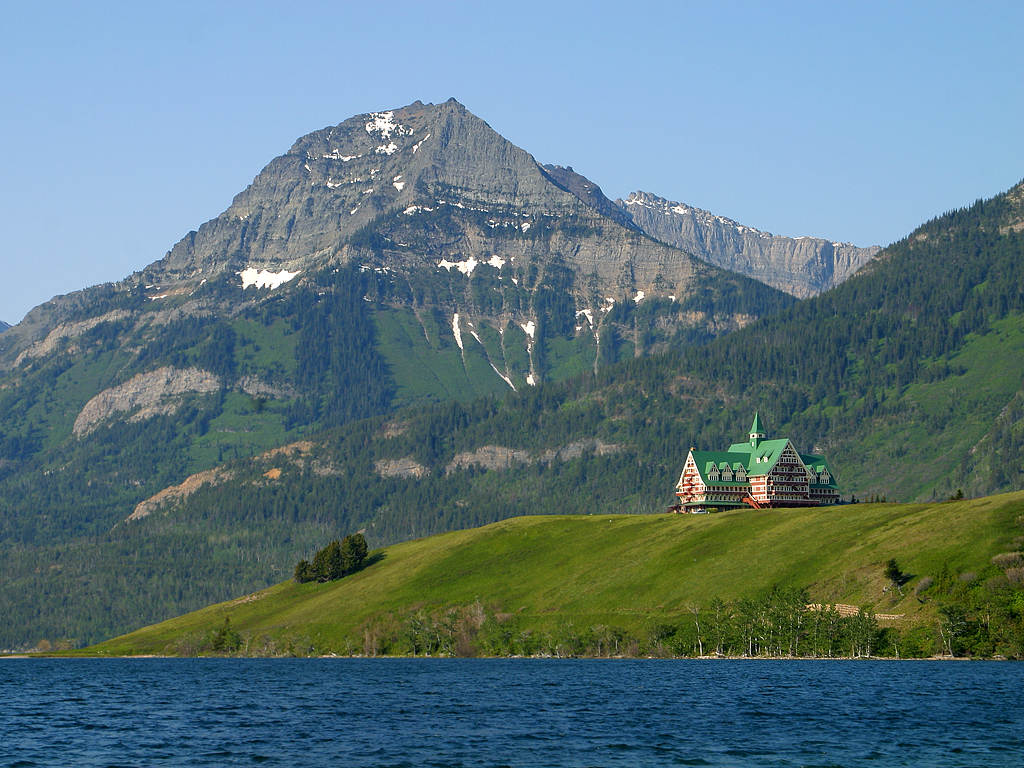
View from Waterton Lake of Mount Richards

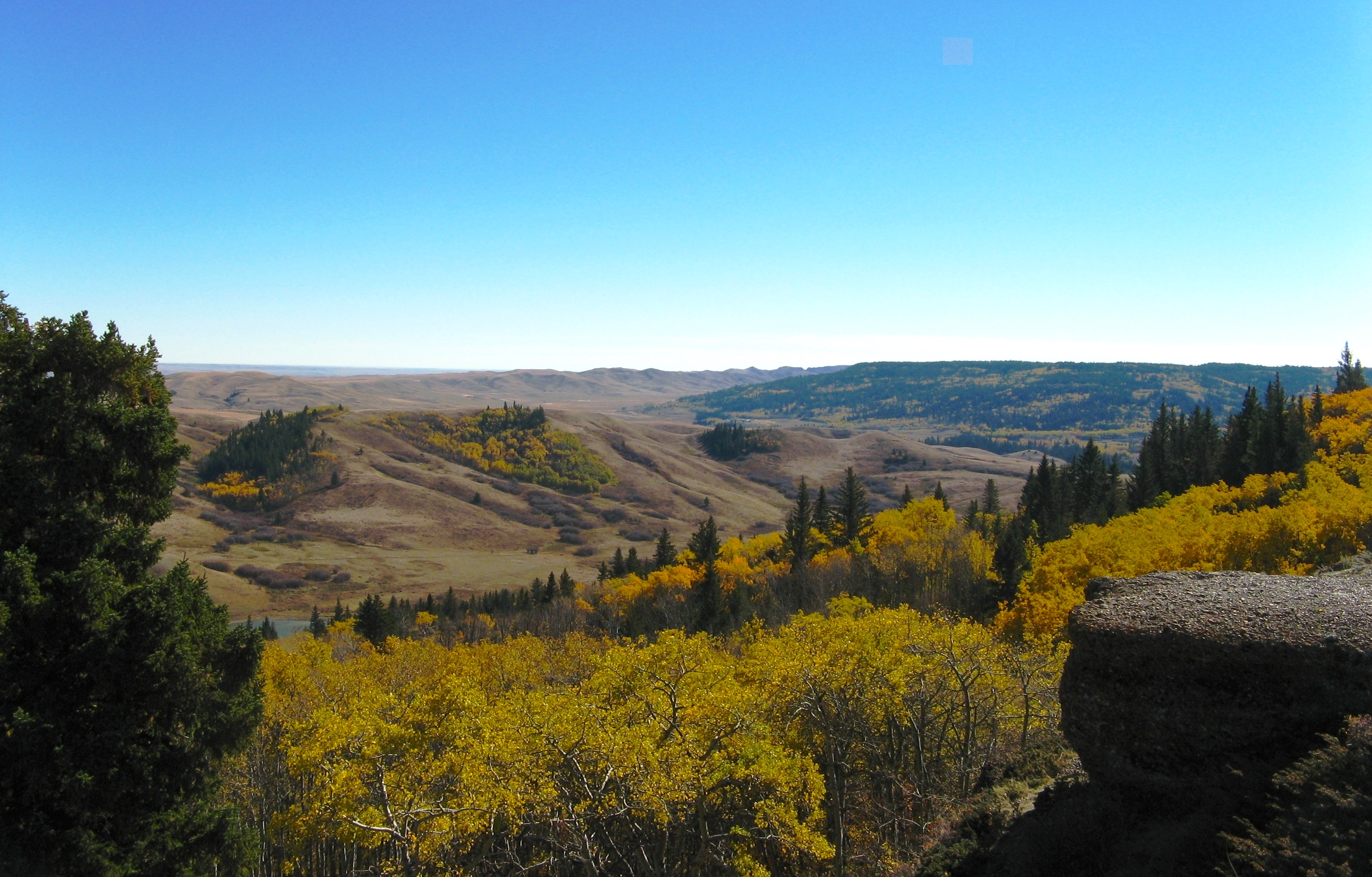
A section of the Cypress Hills

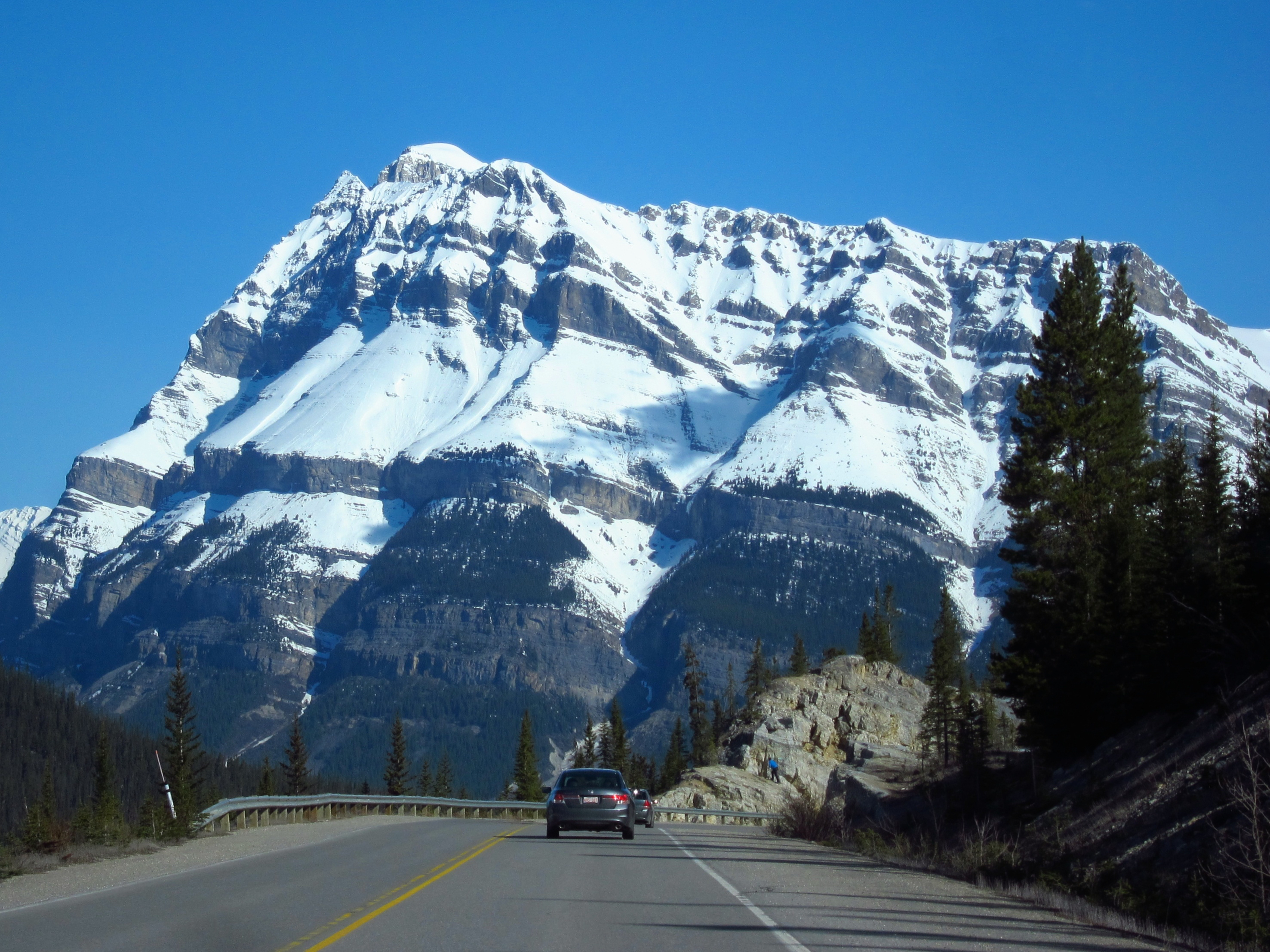
Mount Wilson
