= Mount Backus =

Mountain in Alberta, Canada

- Location within Alberta Location within Canada

Highest point
- Elevation: 1,815 m (5,955 ft)
- Listing: Mountains of Alberta
- Coordinates: 49°26′09″N 114°16′21″W

Geography
- Country: Canada
- Province: Alberta
- Parent range: Canadian Rockies
- Topo map: NTS 82G8 Beaver Mines

Geology
- Rock type: Sedimentary

Mount Backus is a summit in Alberta, Canada.

Mount Backus, named after pioneer settler, Peter Bakos.
