= Golden Eagle Peak =

Mountain in Alberta, Canada

- Location within Alberta

Highest point
- Elevation: 3,048 m (10,000 ft)
- Prominence: 53 m (174 ft)
- Parent peak: Mount Forbes (3612 m)
- Listing: Mountains of Alberta
- Coordinates: 51°51′00″N 116°56′00″W

Geography
- Country: Canada
- Province: Alberta
- Protected area: Banff National Park
- Parent range: Park Ranges
- Topo map: NTS 82N15 Mistaya Lake

Golden Eagle Peak is a summit in Alberta, Canada. Part of the Canadian Rocky Mountain Chain, it sits within Banff National Park and the closest locality is Saskatchewan River Crossing, Alberta, approximately 24 km (15 mi) to the northeast.

Golden Eagle Peak was so named on account of golden eagles in the area.

== See also ==
- List of mountains in the Canadian Rockies
