= Mount Fortune =

Mountain in Alberta, Canada

- Location within Alberta Location within Canada

Highest point
- Elevation: 2,340 m (7,680 ft)
- Prominence: 40 m (130 ft)
- Parent peak: Mount Turbulent (2850 m)
- Listing: Mountains of Alberta
- Coordinates: 50°53′30″N 115°24′46″W

Naming
- Etymology: HMS Fortune

Geography
- Country: Canada
- Province: Alberta
- Protected area: Banff National Park
- Parent range: Park Ranges
- Topo map: NTS 82J14 Spray Lakes Reservoir

Mount Fortune is a summit in Banff National Park in Alberta, Canada.

Mount Fortune was named in tribute to HMS Fortune, a British warship.
