= Gendarme Mountain =

Mountain in Alberta, Canada

- Location within Alberta Location within Canada

Highest point
- Elevation: 2,927 m (9,603 ft)
- Prominence: 437 m (1,434 ft)
- Parent peak: Mount Anne-Alice (3026 m)
- Listing: Mountains of Alberta
- Coordinates: 53°12′37″N 118°12′34″W

Geography
- Location: Alberta, Canada
- Parent range: Park Ranges
- Topo map: NTS 83E3 Mount Robson

Gendarme Mountain is a summit in Alberta, Canada.

The mountain keeps watch over the area like a gendarme, hence the name.
