= The Castelets =

Mountain in Banff NP, Albera, Canada

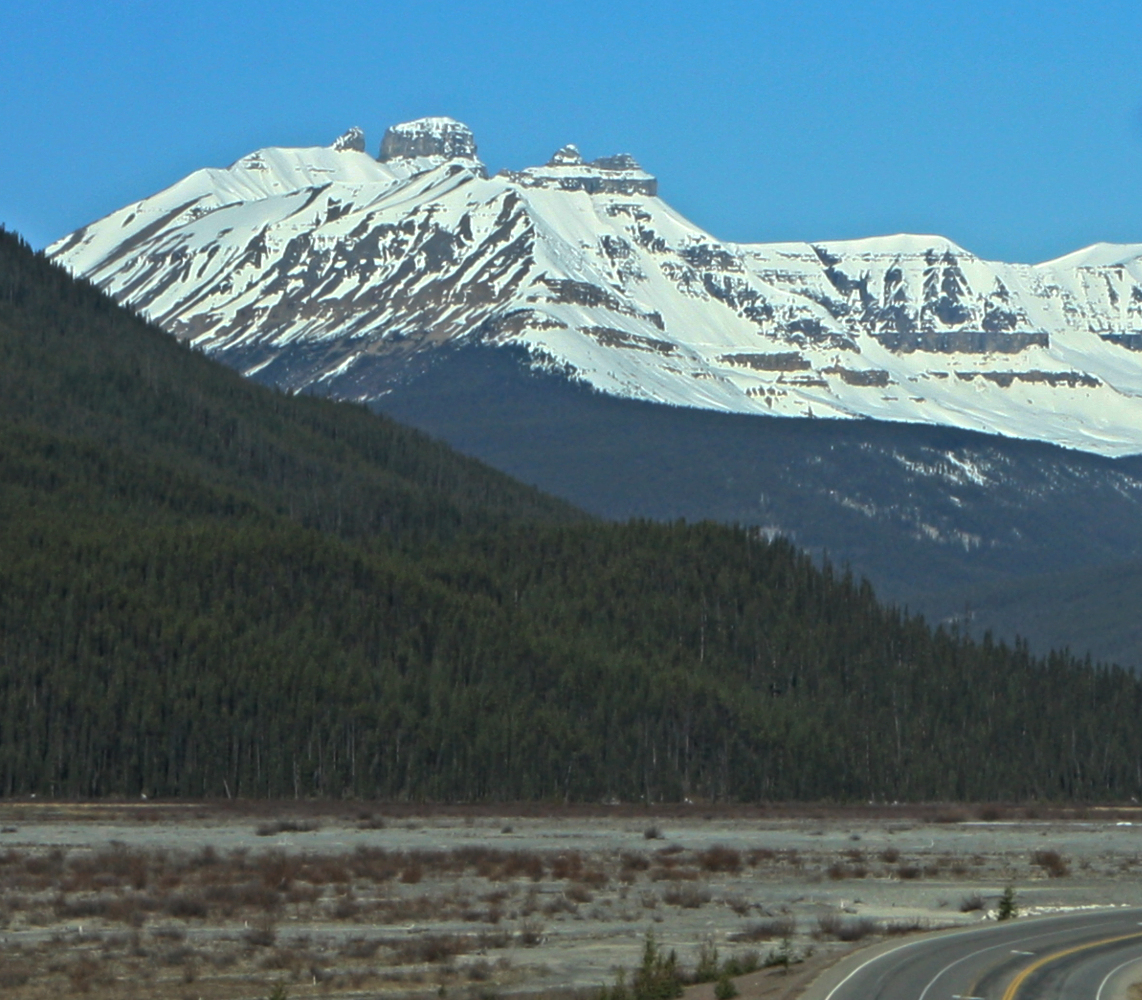
- The Castelets seen from the Icefields Parkway

Highest point
- Elevation: 2,884 m (9,462 ft)
- Prominence: 204 m (669 ft)
- Parent peak: Terrace Mountain (2932 m)
- Listing: Mountains of Alberta
- Coordinates: 52°03′33″N 117°07′32″W

Geography
- Location within Alberta Location within Canada
- Location: Alberta, Canada
- Parent range: Columbia Icefield; Canadian Rockies
- Topo map: NTS 83C3 Columbia Icefield

Geology
- Rock type: Sedimentary

Climbing
- First ascent: July 09, 1923 Conrad Kain, J. Thorington
- Easiest route: Mountaineering

The Castelets is a 2,884-metre (9,462-foot) mountain summit located in the Alexandra River valley of Banff National Park, in the Canadian Rockies of Alberta, Canada. Its nearest higher peak is Terrace Mountain, 4.6 km (2.9 mi) to the northwest. The Castelets can be seen from the Icefields Parkway with optimum photography conditions in morning light.

== History ==
The Castelets was so named in 1920 on account of its outline, said to be shaped like two castles. The mountain's name was made official in 1924 by the Geographical Names Board of Canada.

The first ascent of the mountain was made on July 9, 1923, by Conrad Kain and J. Thorington.

== Geology ==
Like other mountains in Banff Park, The Castelets is composed of sedimentary rock laid down from the Precambrian to Jurassic periods. Formed in shallow seas, this sedimentary rock was pushed east and over the top of younger rock during the Laramide orogeny.

== Climate ==
Based on the Köppen climate classification, The Castelets is located in a subarctic climate with cold, snowy winters, and mild summers. Temperatures can drop below -20 °C with wind chill factors below -30 °C. In terms of favorable weather conditions, summer months are best for climbing. Precipitation runoff from The Castelets drains into the Alexandra River.
