= Mount Henry MacLeod =

Mountain in Alberta, Canada

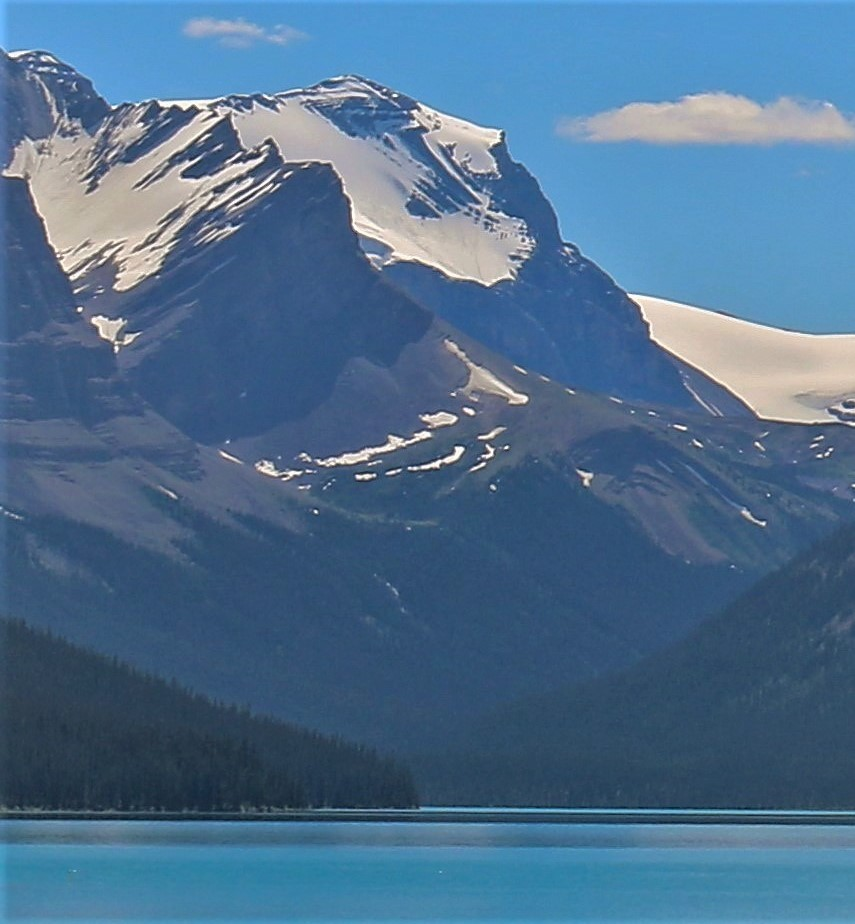
- Mt. Henry MacLeod from Maligne Lake

Highest point
- Elevation: 3,315 m (10,876 ft)
- Prominence: 265 m (869 ft)
- Parent peak: Mount Brazeau (3,470 m)
- Isolation: 2.21 km (1.37 mi)
- Listing: Mountains of Alberta
- Coordinates: 52°31′45″N 117°21′02″W

Geography
- Location within Alberta Location within Canada
- Location: Jasper National Park; Alberta, Canada
- Parent range: Queen Elizabeth Ranges; Canadian Rockies
- Topo map: NTS 83C11 Southesk Lake

Geology
- Rock age: Cambrian
- Rock type: Sedimentary

Mount Henry MacLeod is a 3,315-metre (10,876 ft) summit located in Jasper National Park, in the Canadian Rockies of Alberta, Canada.

Mount Henry MacLeod was named for Henry A. MacLeod, a Canadian Pacific Railroad surveyor who investigated a potential route in the Maligne Valley in 1875.

== Geology ==
Like other mountains in Banff Park, the mountain is composed of sedimentary rock laid down during the Precambrian to Jurassic periods. Formed in shallow seas, this sedimentary rock was pushed east and over the top of younger rock during the Laramide orogeny.

== Climate ==
Based on the Köppen climate classification, Henry MacLeod is located in a subarctic climate zone with cold, snowy winters, and mild summers. Temperatures can drop below -20 °C with wind chill factors below -30 °C.
