= Devon Mountain =

Mountain in Alberta, Canada

- Location within Alberta

Highest point
- Elevation: 3,004 m (9,856 ft)
- Prominence: 489 m (1,604 ft)
- Parent peak: Deluc Peak (3182 m)
- Listing: Mountains of Alberta
- Coordinates: 51°42′49″N 116°15′26″W

Geography
- Country: Canada
- Province: Alberta
- Protected area: Banff National Park
- Parent range: Front Ranges
- Topo map: NTS 82N9 Hector Lake

Climbing
- First ascent: 1919 by Topographical Survey

Devon Mountain is a summit located North of the Clearwater River in Banff National Park, Alberta, Canada.

Devon Mountain was so named on account of Devonian rocks in the area.

== See also ==
- List of mountains in the Canadian Rockies
