= Curia Mountain =

Mountain in Alberta, Canada

- Location within Alberta

Highest point
- Elevation: 2,873 m (9,426 ft)
- Prominence: 153 m (502 ft)
- Parent peak: Basilica Mountain (2899 m)
- Listing: Mountains of Alberta
- Coordinates: 52°47′45″N 118°20′18″W

Geography
- Country: Canada
- Province: Alberta
- Protected area: Banff National Park
- Parent range: Park Ranges
- Topo map: NTS 83D16 Jasper

Curia Mountain is a summit situated between Clairvaux Creek and Meadow Creek in Jasper National Park, Alberta, Canada.

Curia Mountain was so named due to its curia-like (a Roman-era Senate house) outline.
