= Midnight Peak =

Mountain peak in Alberta, Canada

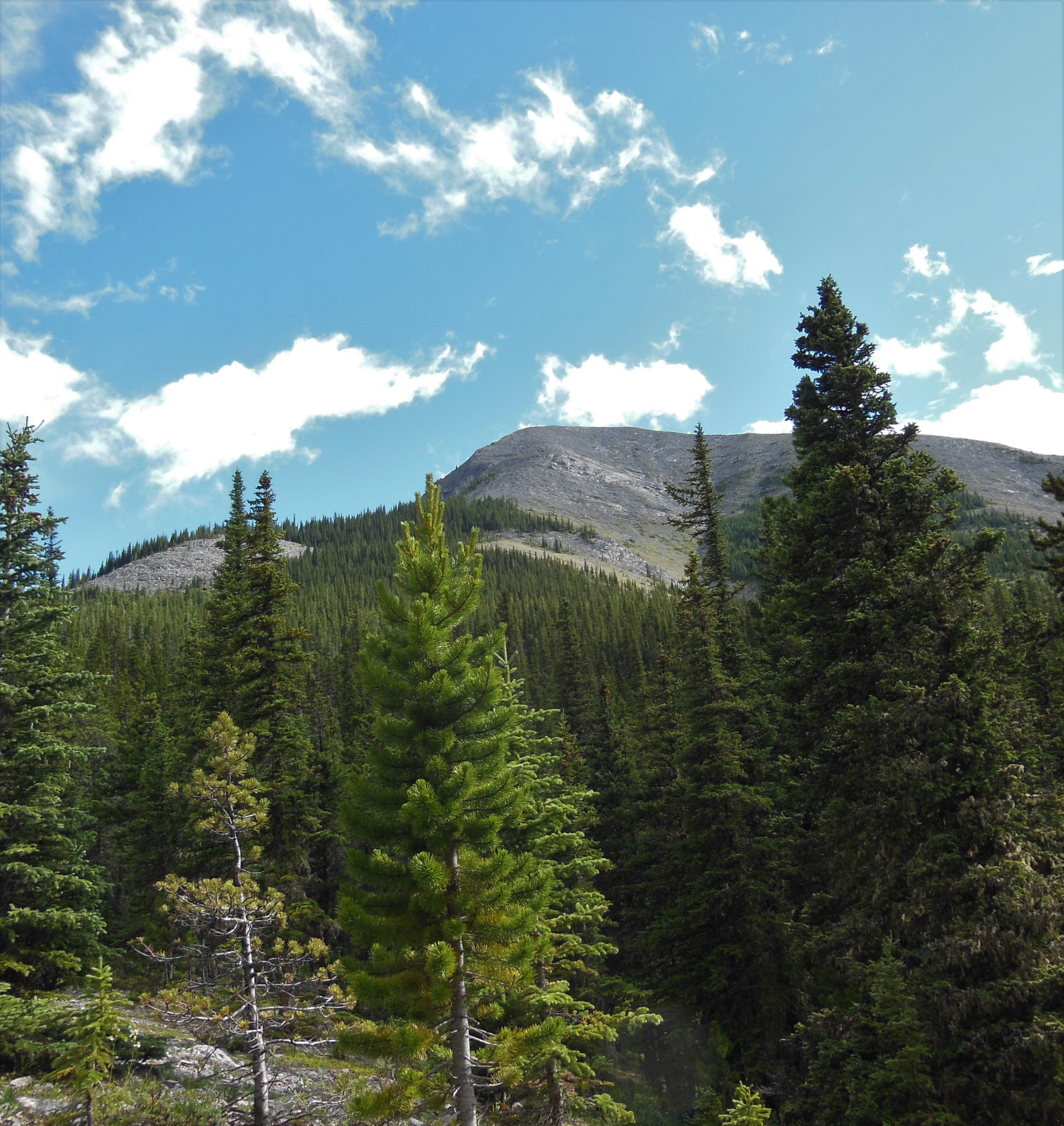
- Midnight Peak seen from the north

Highest point
- Elevation: 2,340 m (7,680 ft)
- Coordinates: 50°58′48″N 115°2′8″W

Geography
- Location within Alberta
- Location: Alberta
- Parent range: Fisher Range
- Topo map: NTS 82J14 Spray Lakes Reservoir

Climbing
- Easiest route: Easy scramble up the south east face

Midnight Peak is located in the Kananaskis River valley along Highway 40 in the Canadian Rockies of Alberta.

== Gallery ==
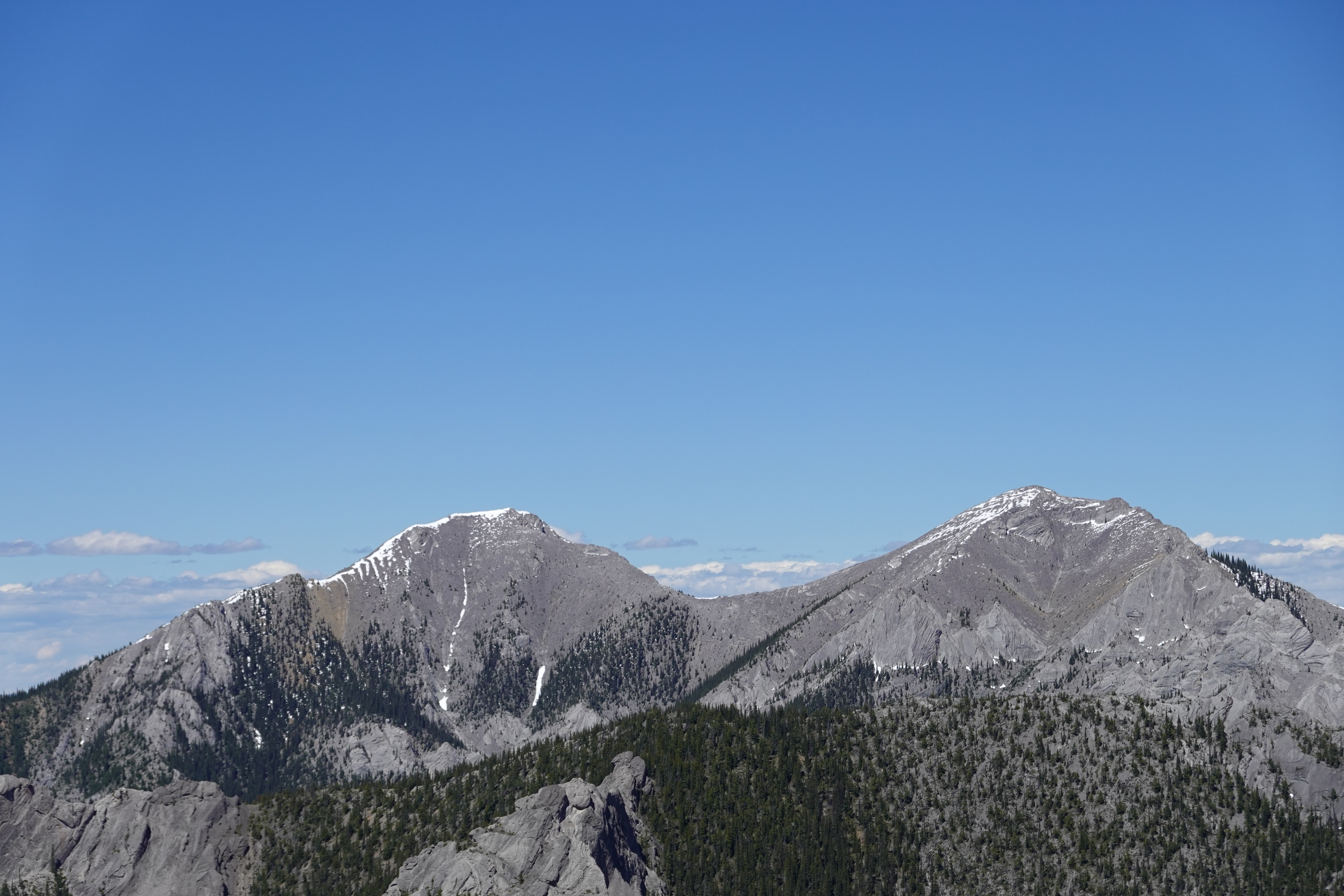
Midnight Peak & Midday Peak seen from Wasootch Ridge

== See also ==
- Mountains of Alberta
