= Cambrai Mountain =

Mountain in Canada

- Location within Alberta Location within British Columbia Location within Canada

Highest point
- Elevation: 3,165 m (10,384 ft) (Note: Another source gives 3,134 metres.)
- Prominence: 452 m (1,483 ft)
- Parent peak: Mount Forbes (3612 m)
- Listing: Mountains of Alberta; Mountains of British Columbia
- Coordinates: 51°49′59″N 116°58′49″W

Geography
- Country: Canada
- Provinces: Alberta and British Columbia
- Protected area: Banff National Park
- Parent range: Park Ranges
- Topo map: NTS 82N15 Mistaya Lake

Cambrai Mountain is a summit in Banff National Park on the border between British Columbia and Alberta, Canada.

Cambrai Mountain was named in commemoration of the Battle of Cambrai (1917).
