= Prairie Mountain (Alberta) =

Mountain in Alberta, Canada

- Location within Alberta

Highest point
- Elevation: 2,214 m (7,264 ft)
- Prominence: 416 m (1,365 ft)
- Listing: Mountains of Alberta
- Coordinates: 50°53′18″N 114°48′22″W

Geography
- Location: Alberta, Canada
- Topo map: NTS 82J15 Bragg Creek

Climbing
- Easiest route: Hike on the southern slopes

Prairie Mountain is located in the Rocky Mountains of Alberta. Due to its proximity to the city of Calgary the hike up the south side is heavily trafficked, and sees use every month of the year.
