= Mount Campion =

Mountain in Alberta, Canada

- Location within Alberta

Highest point
- Elevation: 2,484 m (8,150 ft)
- Prominence: 518 m (1,699 ft)
- Parent peak: Mount Hunter (2607 m)
- Listing: Mountains of Alberta
- Coordinates: 53°36′07″N 118°24′04″W

Geography
- Location: Alberta, Canada
- Parent range: Hoff Range
- Topo map: 83E/09

Mount Campion is a mountain in Alberta, Canada. It is located in Jasper National Park. The peak of Mount Campion is 2,484 metres (8,150 ft) above sea level. The terrain around Mount Campion is mainly hilly. The highest point in the vicinity is 2,575 metres above sea level, 3.1 km south of Mount Campion. The region around Mount Campion is almost uninhabited, with less than two inhabitants per square kilometre. There are no communities in the immediate vicinity. In the area around Mount Campion grows in mainly pine forests. The neighborhood is included in geography. The average annual temperature in the area is-4 °C. The warmest month is July, when the average temperature is 9 °C, and the coldest is February, with-13 °C.

Named after Cpl./Sgt. George Alexander Campion who was killed after the battle of the Hitler Line In Italy during the Second World War, May 23, 1944. Born in Tofield, Alberta January 23, 1911 son of Adolphe Campion (grandson of Cuthbert Grant) and Esther Dumont ( great niece to Gabriel Dumont).
