= Mount Bauerman =

Mountain in Alberta, Canada

- Location within Alberta Location within Canada

Highest point
- Elevation: 2,377 m (7,799 ft)
- Prominence: 166 m (545 ft)
- Parent peak: Anderson Peak (2652 m)
- Listing: Mountains of Alberta
- Coordinates: 49°07′41″N 114°07′33″W

Geography
- Location: Alberta, Canada
- Parent range: Border Ranges
- Topo map: NTS 82G1 Sage Creek

Mount Bauerman is a mountain in Waterton Lakes National Park, Alberta, Canada.

Mount Bauerman has the name of H. Bauerman, a government geologist.
