= Mount Burney =

Mountain in Alberta, Canada

Coordinates: 50.710°N 115.061°W

Mount Burney is a summit in Alberta, Canada.

Mount Burney was named for Cecil Burney, a British naval commander.
