= Kleodora Peak =

Mountain peak in Alberta, Canada

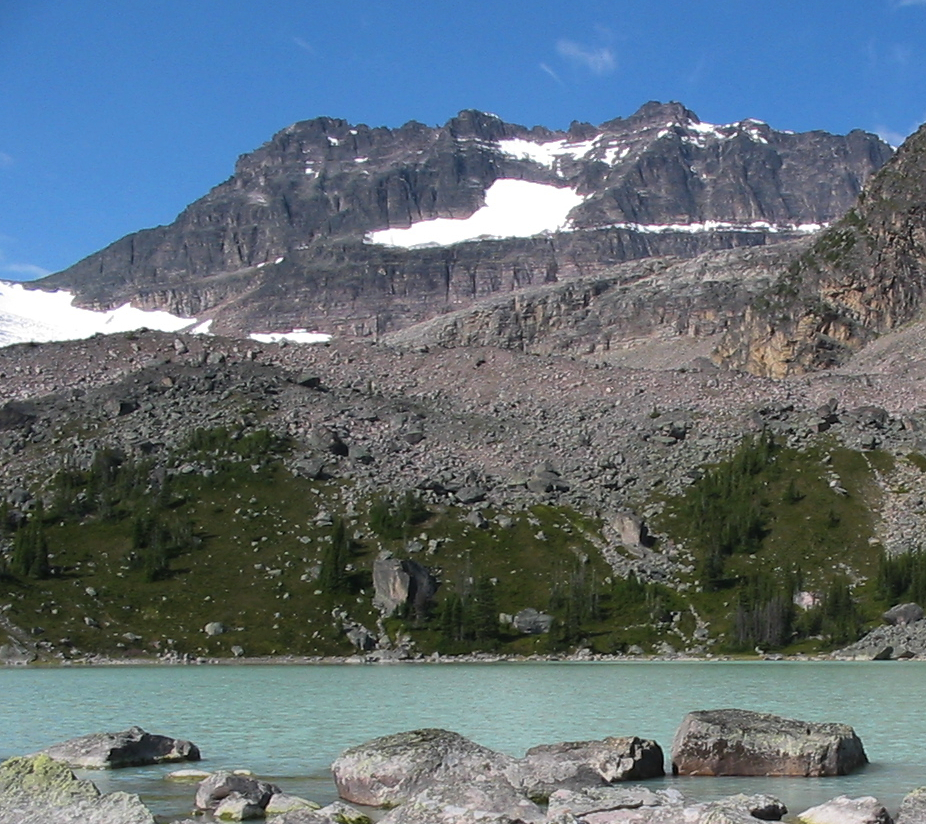
- Kleodora Peak seen from Fryatt Valley

Highest point
- Elevation: 2,850 m (9,350 ft)
- Prominence: 110 m (360 ft)
- Parent peak: Parnassus Peak (2905 m)
- Listing: Mountains of Alberta
- Coordinates: 52°29′33″N 117°55′32″W

Geography
- Location within Alberta Location within Canada
- Location: Alberta, Canada
- Parent range: Canadian Rockies
- Topo map: NTS 83C5 Fortress Lake

Geology
- Rock type: Sedimentary

Kleodora Peak is a 2,850-metre (9,350 ft) mountain summit located in the Athabasca River valley of Jasper National Park, in the Canadian Rockies of Alberta, Canada. It is situated at the head of Fryatt Creek Valley on the same high ridge as Mount Christie, Brussels Peak, Mount Lowell, Xerxes Peak, and Karpathos Peak (Mount Olympus). Its nearest higher peak is Parnassus Peak, 1.0 km (0.62 mi) to the north. The mountain was named for Kleodora, who in Greek mythology lived on Mount Parnassus. The name has not been officially adopted yet for this peak. An unnamed glacier lies below the eastern slope in the cirque between Kleodora Peak and Mount Belanger.

== Climate ==
Based on the Köppen climate classification, Kleodora Peak is located in a subarctic climate with long, cold, snowy winters, and short mild summers. Temperatures can drop below -20 °C with wind chill factors below -30 °C. Precipitation runoff from Kleodora Peak drains into tributaries of the Athabasca River.

== Gallery ==
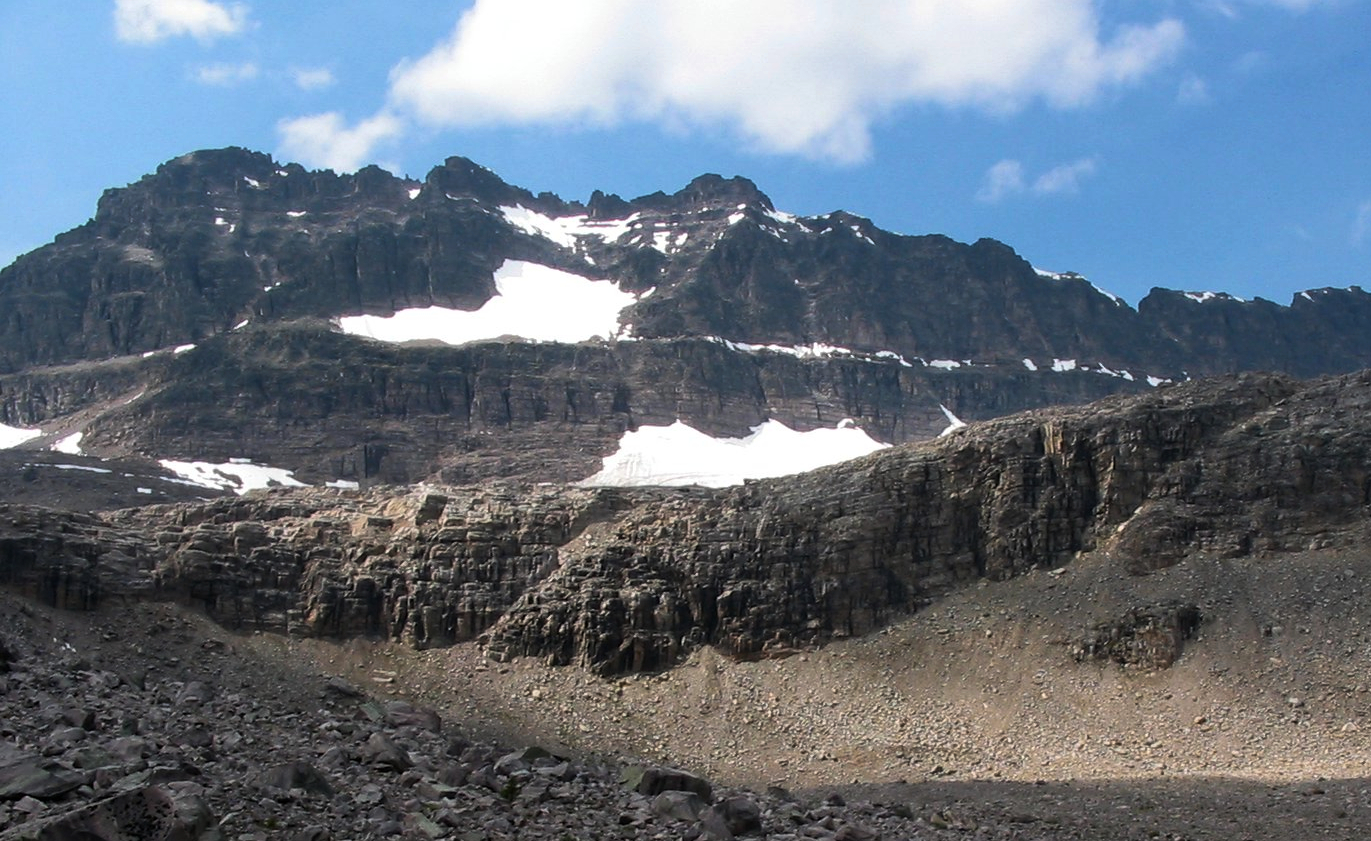
Kleodora Peak seen from the head of Fryatt Valley

== See also ==
- Geography of Alberta
- Geology of the Rocky Mountains
