= Karpathos Peak (Mount Olympus) =

Mountain in the Canadian Rockies

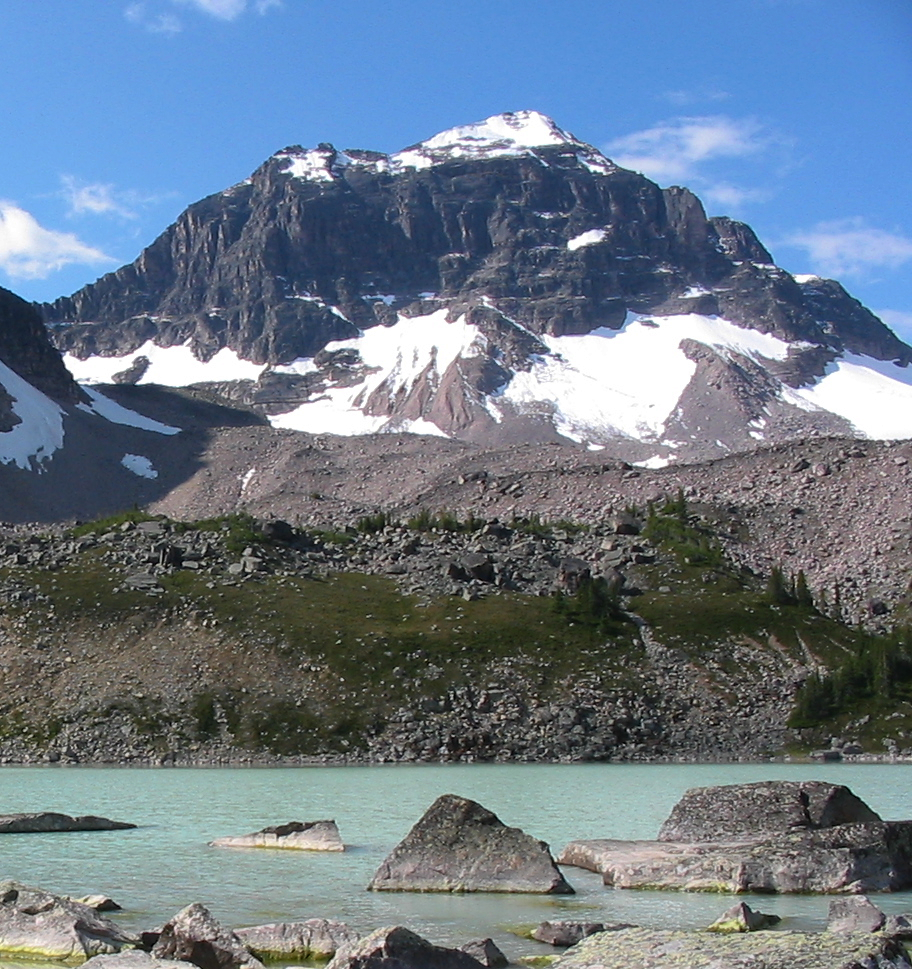
- Karpathos Peak seen from Fryatt Valley

Highest point
- Elevation: 2,987 m (9,800 ft)
- Prominence: 367 m (1,204 ft)
- Parent peak: Mount Belanger (3120 m)
- Listing: Mountains of Alberta
- Coordinates: 52°28′58″N 117°54′39″W

Geography
- Location within Alberta Location within Canada
- Location: Alberta, Canada
- Parent range: Park Ranges; Canadian Rockies
- Topo map: NTS 83C5 Fortress Lake

Geology
- Rock type: Sedimentary

Climbing
- First ascent: 1926 by J.W.A. Hickson, Howard Palmer, Hans Fuhrer
- Easiest route: Mountaineering

Karpathos Peak, also previously known as Mount Olympus, is a 2,987 metres (9,800 ft) mountain summit located in the Athabasca River valley of Jasper National Park, in the Canadian Rockies of Alberta, Canada. It is situated at the head of Fryatt Creek Valley on the same high ridge as Mount Christie, Brussels Peak, Mount Lowell, and Xerxes Peak. The nearest higher peak is Mount Belanger, 3.0 km (1.9 mi) to the north, and Kleodora Peak lies to the immediate northwest. Karpathos Peak can be seen from the Icefields Parkway, weather permitting.

== History ==
The mountain was named for the Greek island Karpathos, home to the town Olympos. The peak originally had the unofficial name Olympus, but was subsequently changed to avoid confusion with other Mount Olympus in the range. However, no name has been officially adopted yet for this peak.

The first ascent of the mountain was made in 1926 by J. W. A. Hickson and Howard Palmer with guide Hans Fuhrer.

== Geology ==
Karpathos Peak is composed of sedimentary rock laid down from the Precambrian to Jurassic periods, then pushed east and over the top of younger rock during the Laramide orogeny.

== Climate ==
Based on the Köppen climate classification, Karpathos Peak is located in a subarctic climate with long, cold, snowy winters, and short mild summers. Temperatures can drop below -20 °C with wind chill factors below -30 °C. Precipitation runoff from Karpathos Peak drains into Fryatt Creek and Lick Creek, both tributaries of the Athabasca River.

== Gallery ==
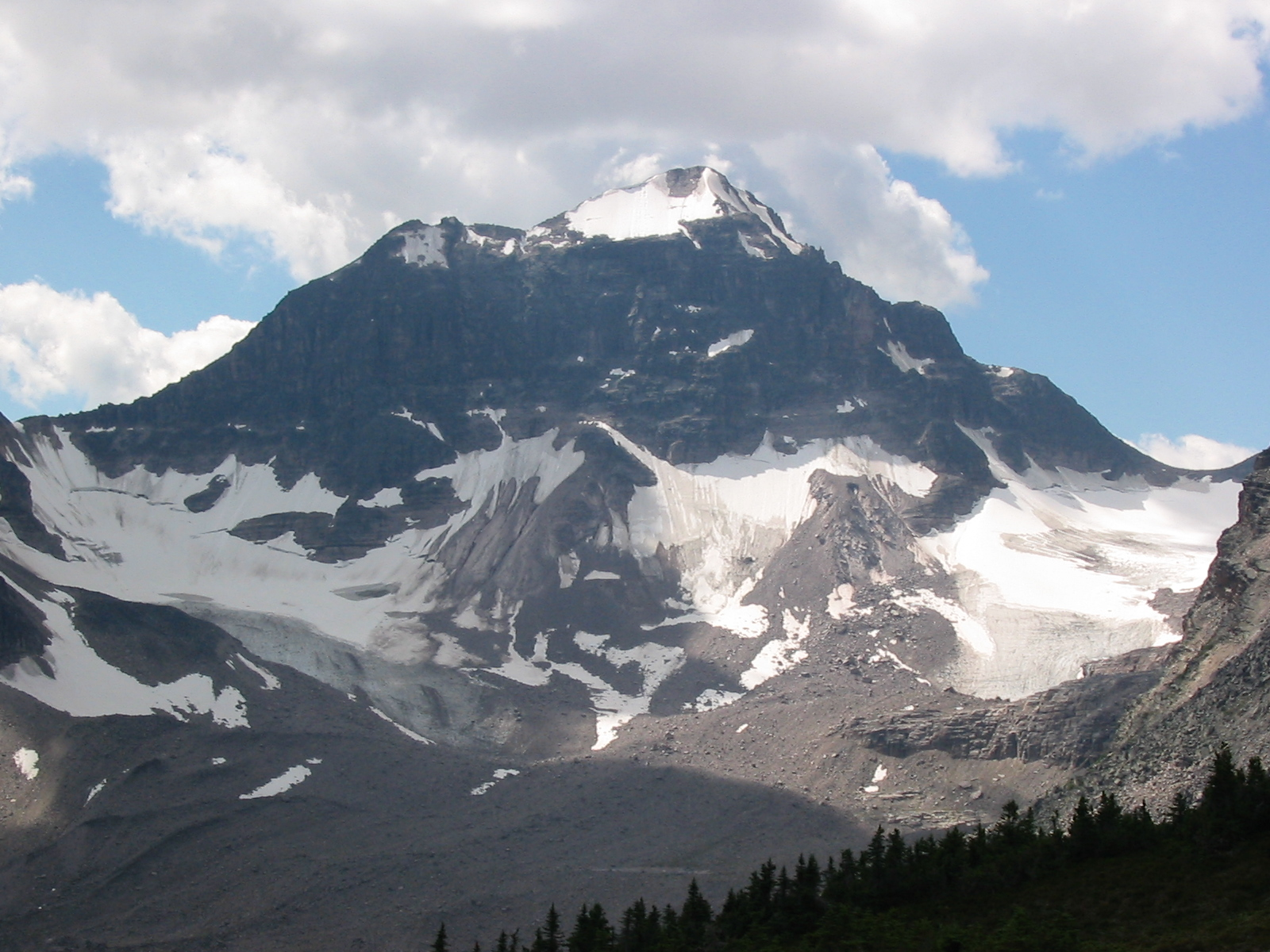
Karpathos Peak (Mount Olympus)

== See also ==
- List of mountains in the Canadian Rockies
- Geography of Alberta
