= Dragon Peak =

Mountain in Alberta, Canada

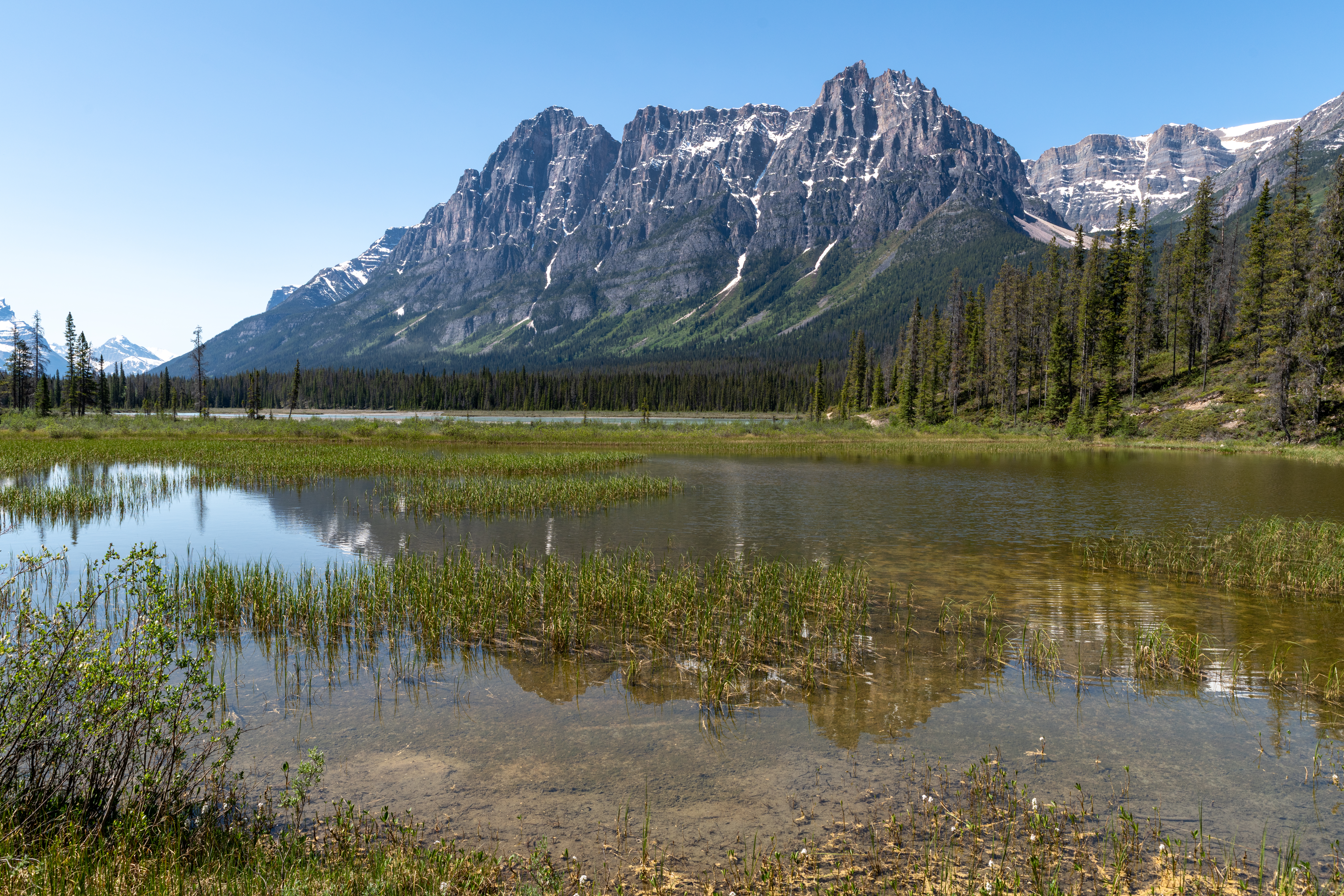
- Dragon Peak seen from northeast

Highest point
- Elevation: 2,880 m (9,450 ft)
- Prominence: 246 m (807 ft)
- Parent peak: Catacombs Mountain (3290 m)
- Listing: Mountains of Alberta
- Coordinates: 52°26′46″N 117°42′04″W

Geography
- Location within Alberta Location within Canada
- Country: Canada
- Province: Alberta
- Protected area: Jasper National Park
- Parent range: Canadian Rockies
- Topo map: NTS 83C5 Fortress Lake

Geology
- Rock type: Sedimentary

Climbing
- First ascent: 1979 by D. Waterman
- Easiest route: YDS Class 4-5

Dragon Peak is a 2,880 metres (9,450 ft) mountain summit located in the Athabasca River valley of Jasper National Park, in the Canadian Rockies of Alberta, Canada. Situated southeast of Mount Christie and Brussels Peak, Dragon Peak can be seen from the Icefields Parkway. The first ascent of the mountain was made in 1979 by D. Waterman. Dragon Peak was named in 1921 by Arthur O. Wheeler on account of a dragon-shaped rock formation. The mountain's name was officially adopted in 1935 by the Geographical Names Board of Canada.

== Geology ==
Dragon Peak is composed of sedimentary rock laid down from the Precambrian to Jurassic periods, then pushed east and over the top of younger rock during the Laramide orogeny.

== Climate ==
Based on the Köppen climate classification, Dragon Peak is located in a subarctic climate with long, cold, snowy winters, and short mild summers. Temperatures can drop below -20 °C with wind chill factors below -30 °C. Precipitation runoff from Dragon Peak drains into Fryatt Creek and Luck Creek, both tributaries of the Athabasca River.

== See also ==
- List of mountains of Canada
- Geology of Alberta
- Geology of the Rocky Mountains
