= Geraldine Peak =

Mountain peak in Jasper NP, Alberta, Canada

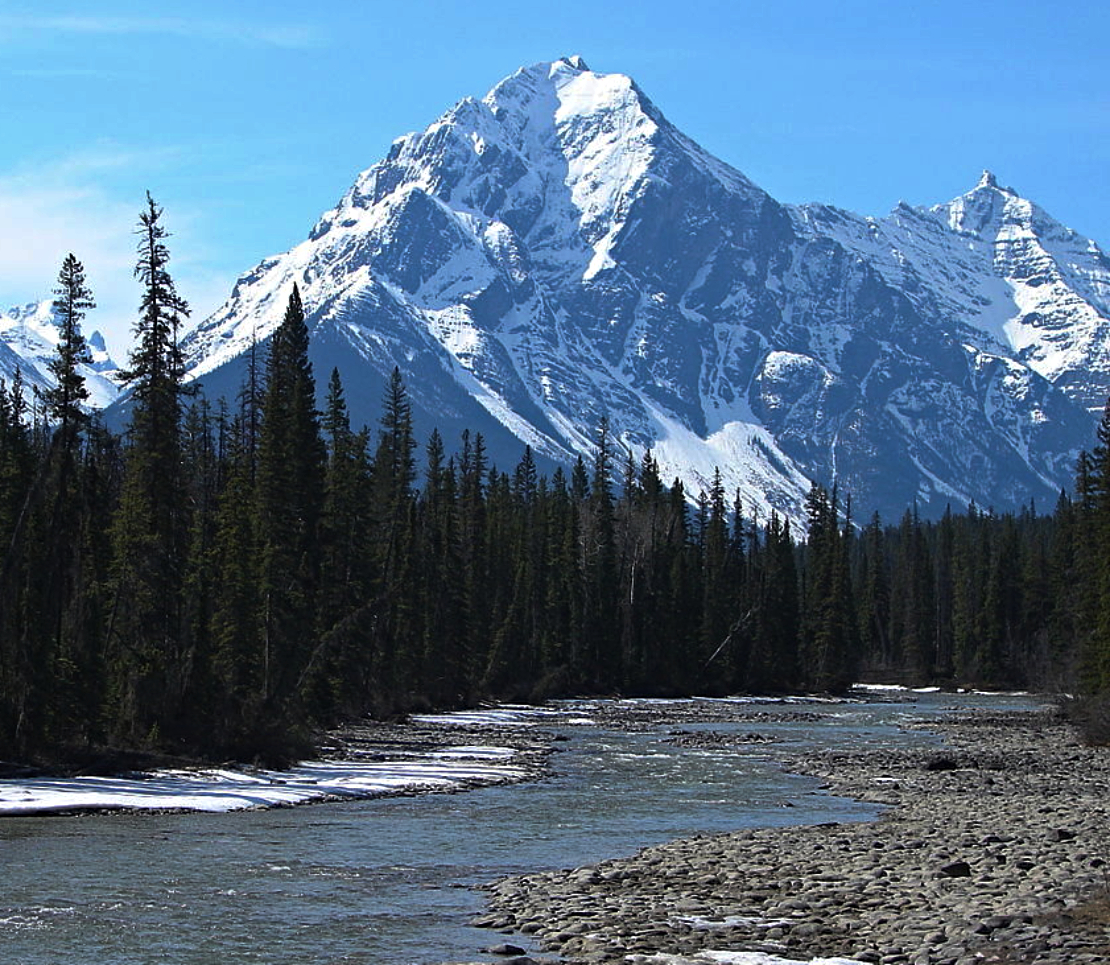
- Geraldine Peak seen from Whirlpool River

Highest point
- Elevation: 2,930 m (9,610 ft)
- Prominence: 710 m (2,330 ft)
- Parent peak: Mount Fryatt 3361 m
- Listing: Mountains of Alberta
- Coordinates: 52°36′26″N 117°57′25″W

Geography
- Location within Alberta Location within Canada
- Interactive map of Geraldine Peak
- Location: Alberta, Canada
- Parent range: Canadian Rockies
- Topo map: NTS 83C12 Athabasca Falls

Climbing
- Easiest route: Scrambling

Geraldine Peak is a 2,930-metre (9,610-foot) mountain summit located in the Athabasca River valley of Jasper National Park, in the Canadian Rockies of Alberta, Canada. The peak is also known as Whirlpool Mountain, and Mount Geraldine. No name has been officially adopted yet. The names derive from its position at the northern end of the long ridge that divides Geraldine Lakes and Geraldine Creek on the southeast side, from the Whirlpool River on the northwest side. The nearest higher peak is Mount Fryatt, 7.0 km (4.3 mi) to the south-southeast. Geraldine Peak can be seen from the Icefields Parkway in the vicinity of Athabasca Falls.

== Climate ==
Based on the Köppen climate classification, Geraldine Peak is located in a subarctic climate with cold, snowy winters, and mild summers. Temperatures can drop below -20 °C with wind chill factors below -30 °C. Precipitation runoff from Geraldine Peak drains into tributaries of the Athabasca River.

== Geology ==
The mountain is composed of sedimentary rock laid down during the Precambrian to Jurassic periods and pushed east and over the top of younger rock during the Laramide orogeny.

== Gallery ==
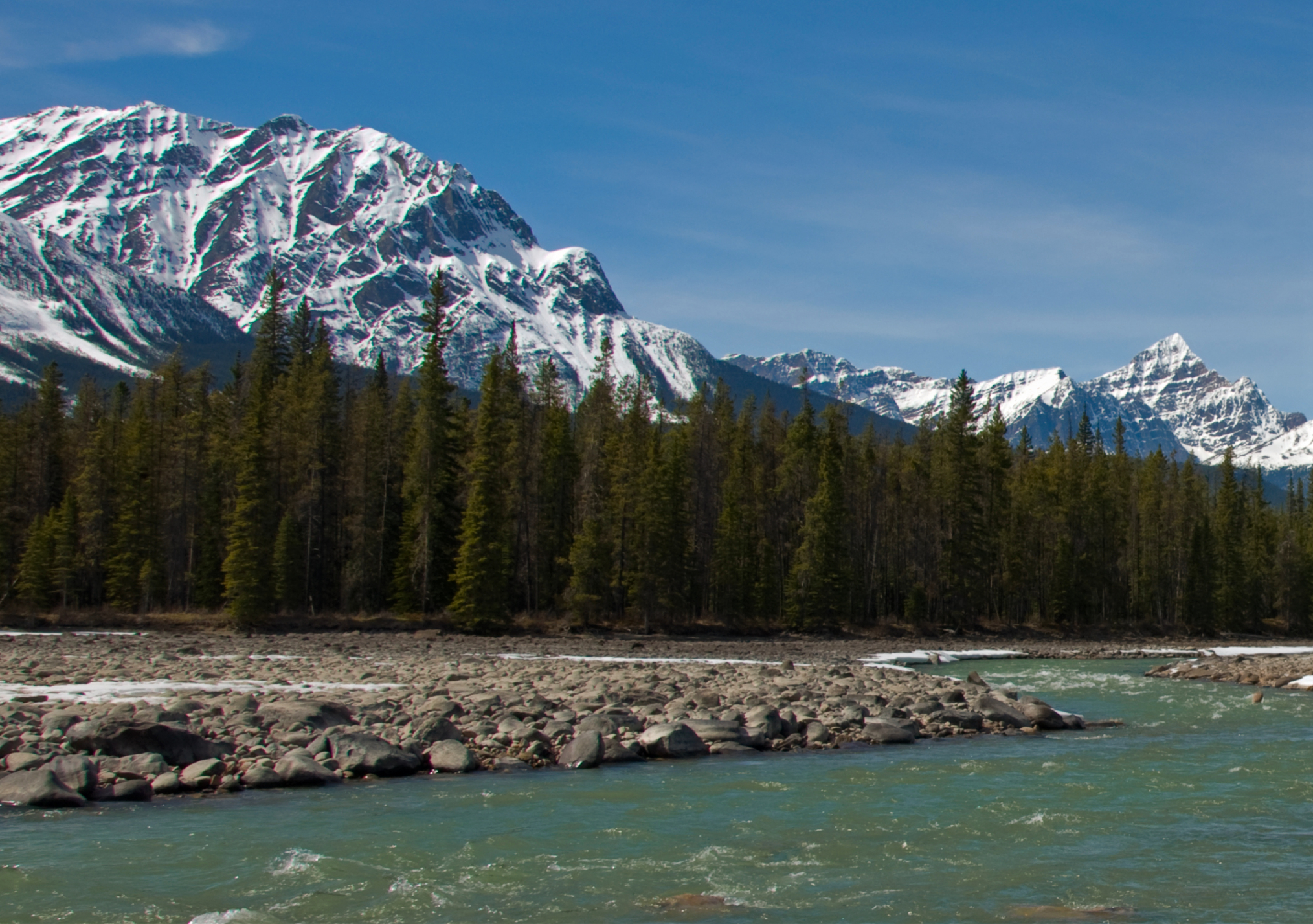
Whirlpool Mountain (left) and Mount Edith Cavell (right) seen with Athabasca River

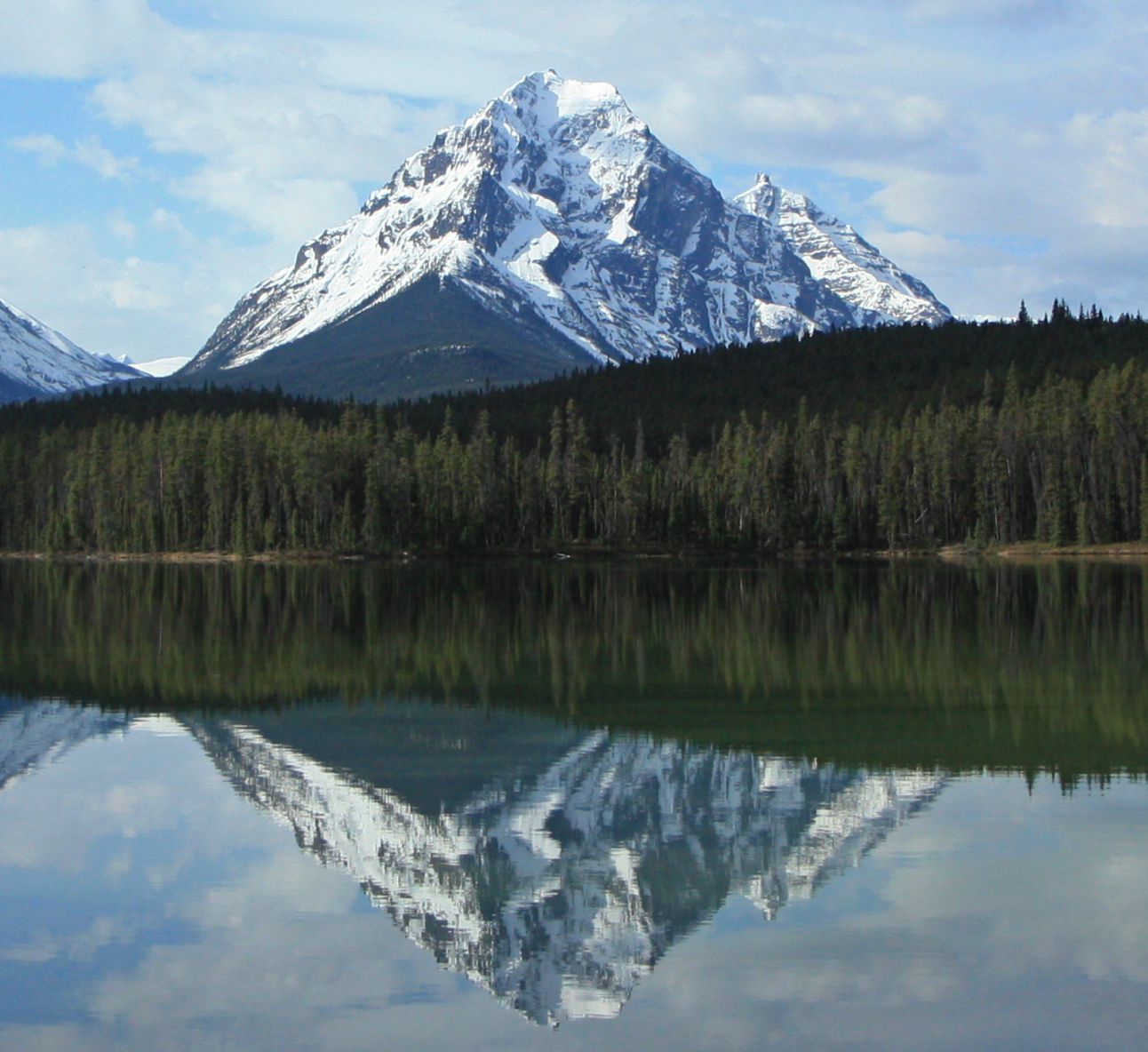
Whirlpool Mountain reflected in Leech Lake

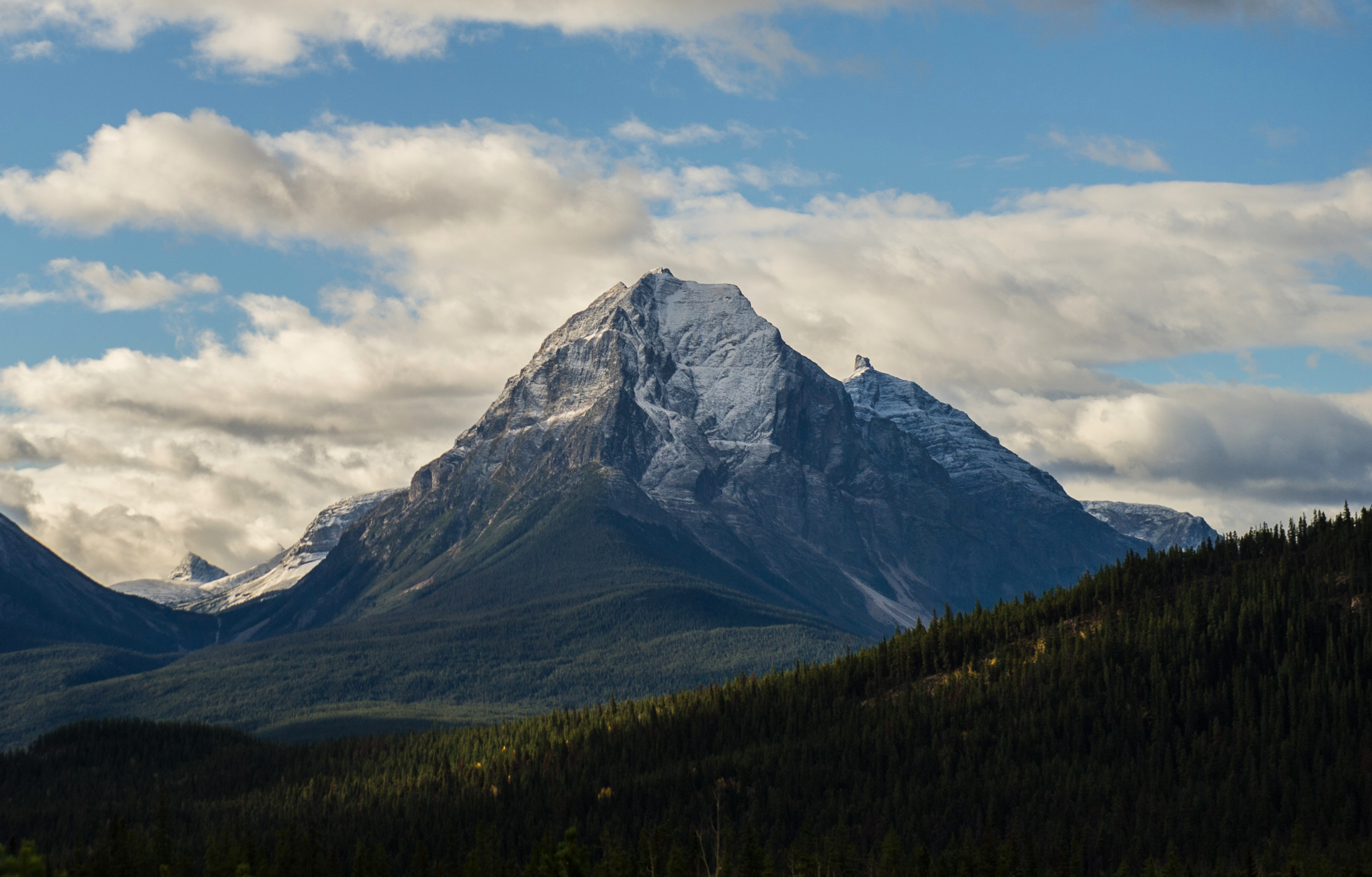
Whirlpool Mountain

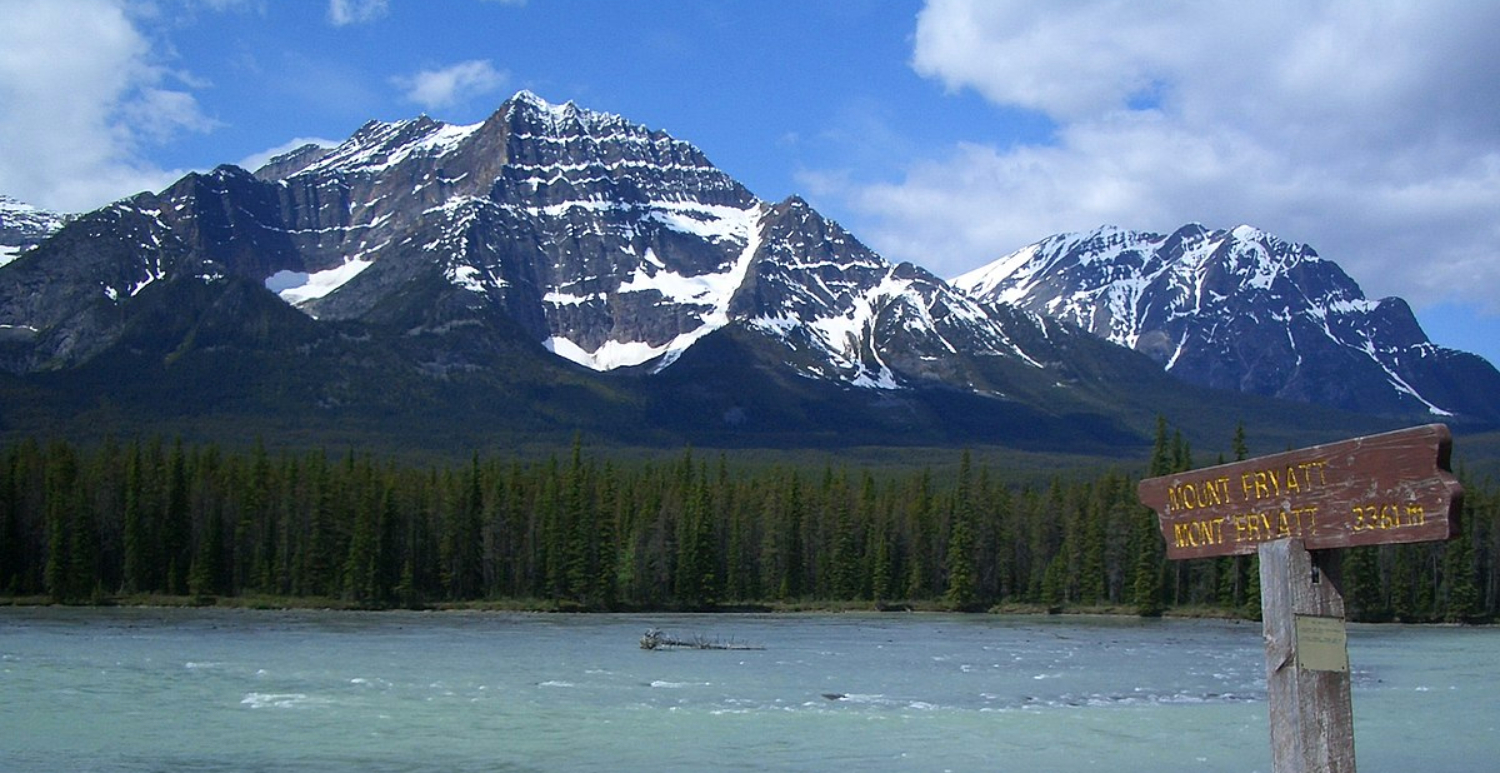
Mount Fryatt outlier (left) and Whirlpool Mountain (right)

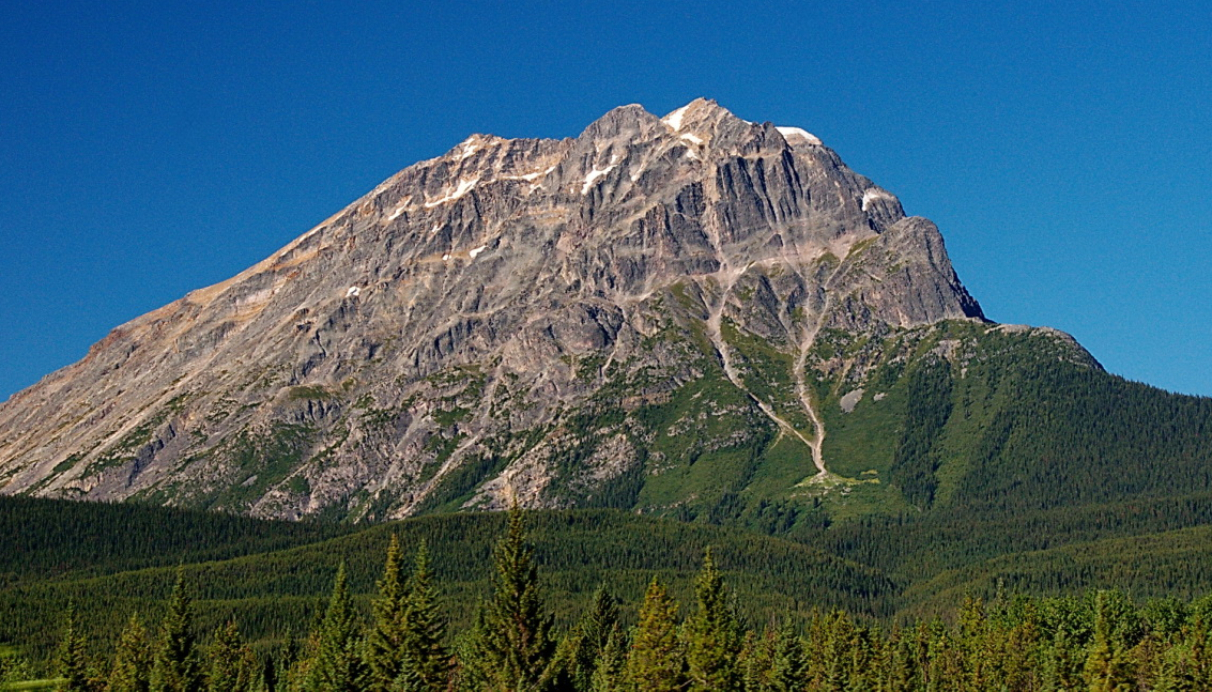
Geraldine Peak

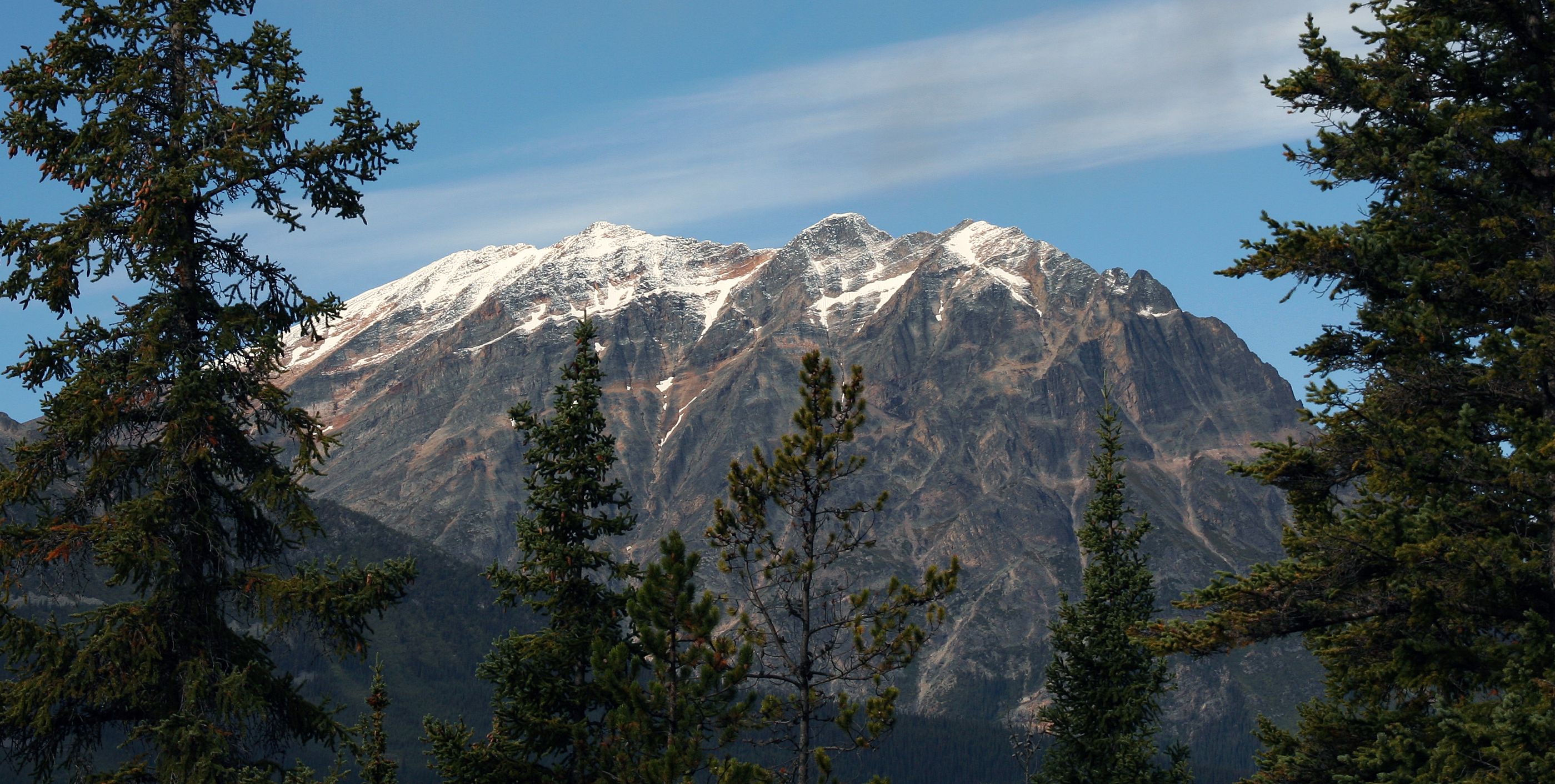
Geraldine Peak

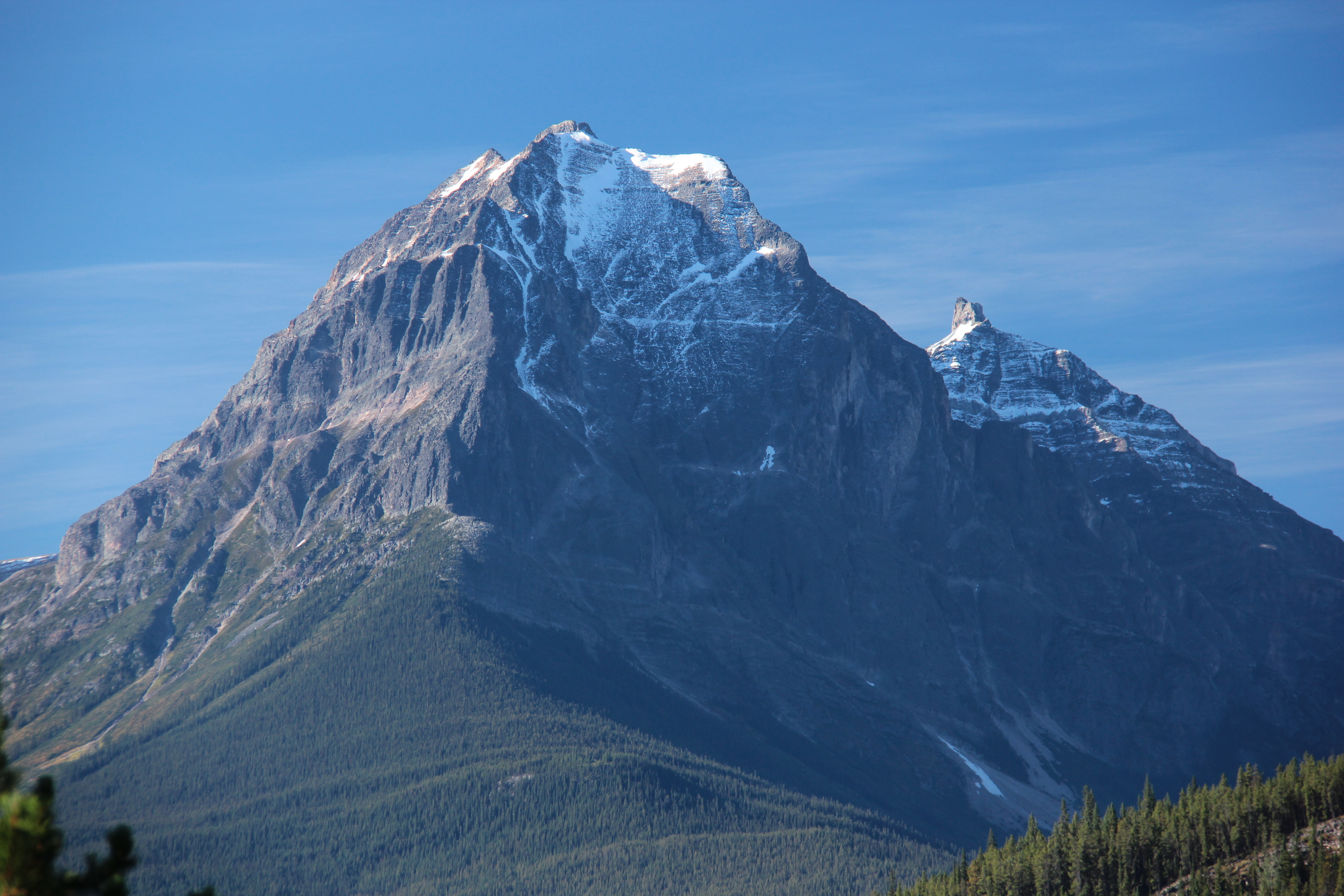
Geraldine Peak

== See also ==
- Geography of Alberta
