= Mount Belanger =

Mountain in Alberta, Canada

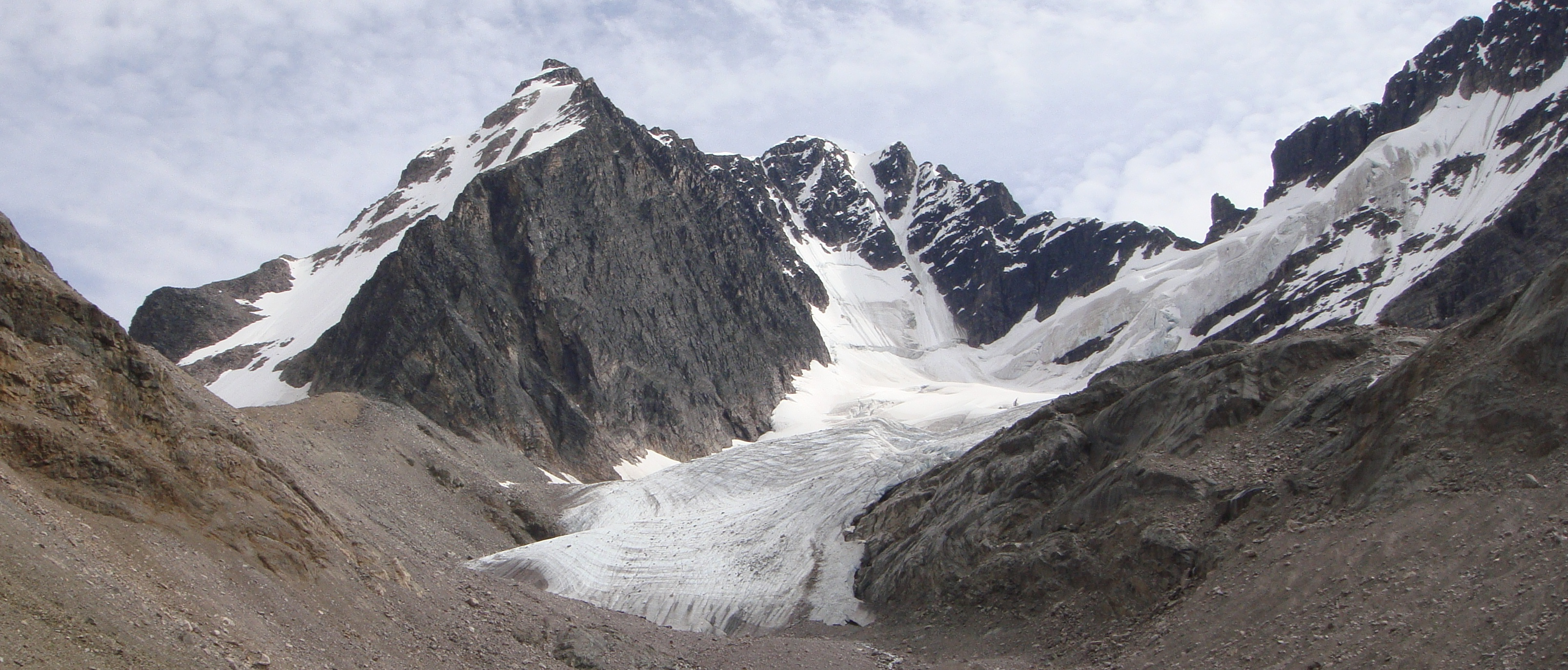
- The west face of Mount Belanger, August 2011

Highest point
- Elevation: 3,120 m (10,240 ft)
- Prominence: 589 m (1,932 ft)
- Parent peak: Mount Fryatt 3,361 m
- Listing: Mountains of Alberta
- Coordinates: 52°30′41″N 117°55′22″W

Geography
- Location within Alberta Location within Canada
- Country: Canada
- Province: Alberta
- Protected area: Jasper National Park
- Parent range: Canadian Rockies
- Topo map: NTS 83C12 Athabasca Falls

Climbing
- First ascent: July 14, 1930 by W.R. Hainsworth, J.F. Lehmann, M.M. Strumia
- Easiest route: North face II

Mount Belanger is a 3,109-metre (10,200 ft) mountain, making it Alberta's 130th highest peak. It was named in 1814 in memory of André Bélanger, a French Canadian, member of the Astoria expedition, who with Gabriel Franchère and others where coming back by land to Montréal. After having set up Astoria at the mouth of the Columbia River in present day Oregon. André Bélanger and Olivier Roy-Lapensée drowned in the Athabasca River in 1814 and Thus Gabriel Franchère named that mountain after him and a rapid and a piece of land in memory of Lapensée. It lies within peaks that are between the Athabasca River and Whirlpool Rivers in Jasper National Park.

== Climate ==
Based on the Köppen climate classification, Mount Belanger is located in a subarctic climate zone with cold, snowy winters, and mild summers. Wintertime lows can reach -20 °C with wind chill values as low as -30 °C.

== Gallery ==
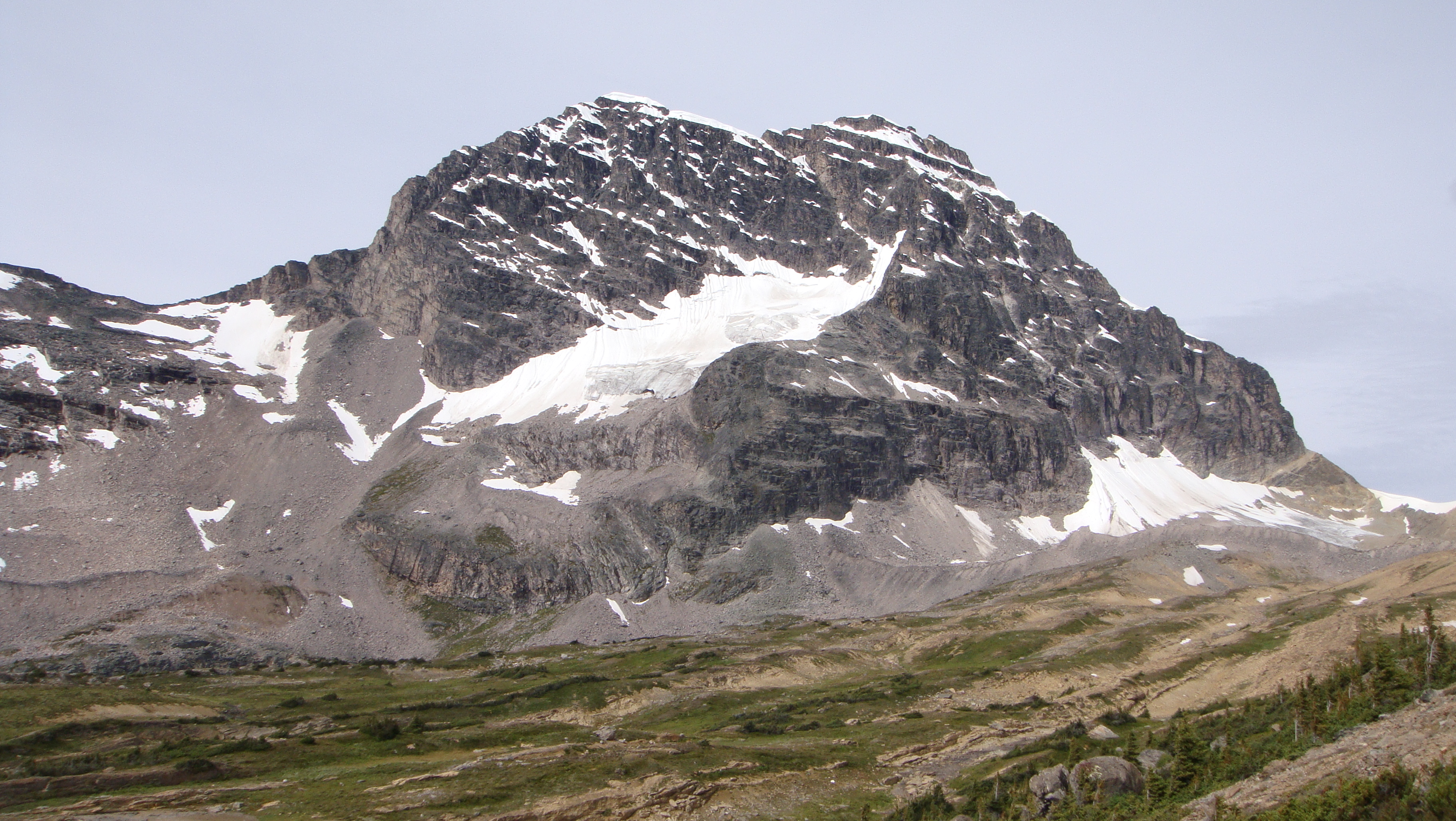
East face of Belanger

== See also ==
- Geography of Alberta
- Brussels Peak
