= Mount Christie =

Mount Christie may refer to:

- Mount Christie (Alberta) in Alberta, Canada
- Mount Christie (Washington) in Washington, USA
