= Xerxes Peak =

Mountain summit in Alberta, Canada

- Mount Xerxes
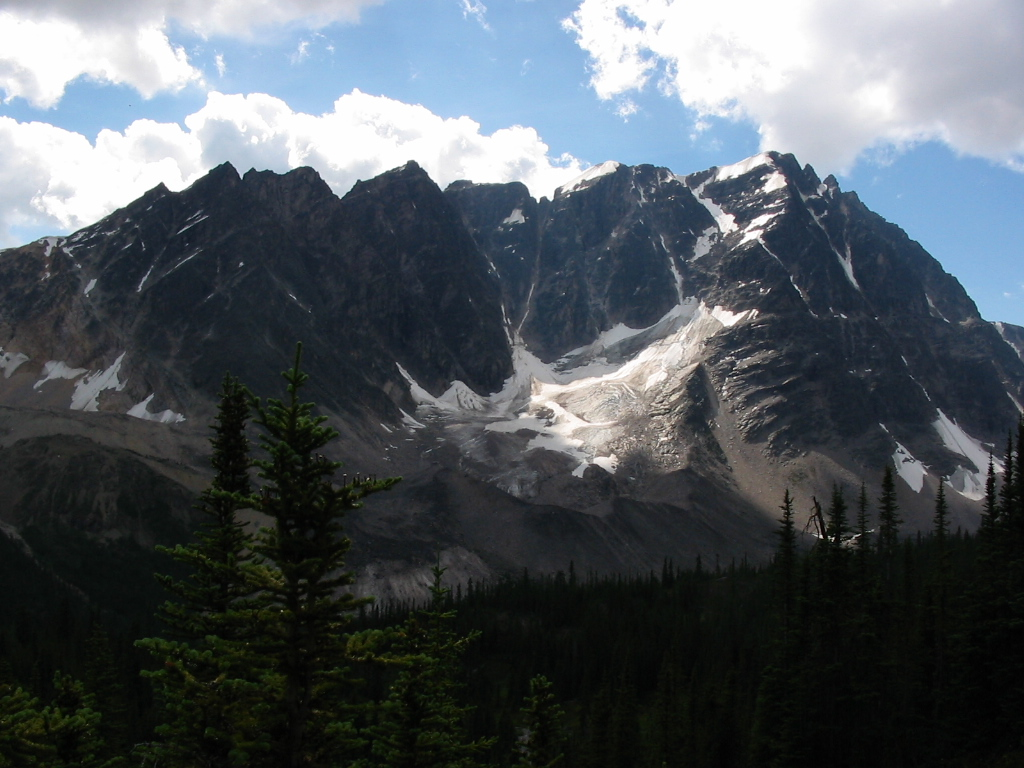
- Xerxes Peak seen from Fryatt Valley

Highest point
- Elevation: 2,970 m (9,740 ft)
- Prominence: 320 m (1,050 ft)
- Parent peak: Karpathos Peak (Mount Olympus) (2987 m)
- Listing: Mountains of Alberta
- Coordinates: 52°29′11″N 117°53′16″W

Geography
- Location within Alberta Location within Canada
- Location: Alberta, Canada
- Parent range: Canadian Rockies
- Topo map: NTS 83C5 Fortress Lake

Geology
- Rock type: Sedimentary

Climbing
- First ascent: 1936 by Mr. and Mrs. A.W. Kramer, and A. McKay
- Easiest route: Mountaineering

Xerxes Peak, also known as Mount Xerxes, is a 2,970-metre (9,740 ft) mountain summit located in the Athabasca River valley of Jasper National Park, in the Canadian Rockies of Alberta, Canada. No name has been officially adopted yet for this peak. It is situated at the head of Fryatt Creek Valley on the same high ridge as Mount Christie, Brussels Peak, and Mount Lowell. The nearest higher peak is Karpathos Peak (Mount Olympus), 2.0 km (1.2 mi) to the west.

== History ==
The mountain was named in 1936 for the two kings of Persia, Xerxes I and Xerxes II.

The first ascent of the mountain was made in 1936 by Mr. and Mrs. A.W. Kramer, and A. McKay.

== Geology ==
Xerxes Peak is composed of sedimentary rock laid down from the Precambrian to Jurassic periods, then pushed east and over the top of younger rock during the Laramide orogeny.

== Climate ==
Based on the Köppen climate classification, Xerxes Peak is located in a subarctic climate with long, cold, snowy winters, and short mild summers. Temperatures can drop below -20 °C with wind chill factors below -30 °C. Precipitation runoff from Xerxes Peak drains into Fryatt Creek and Lick Creek, both tributaries of the Athabasca River.

== Gallery ==
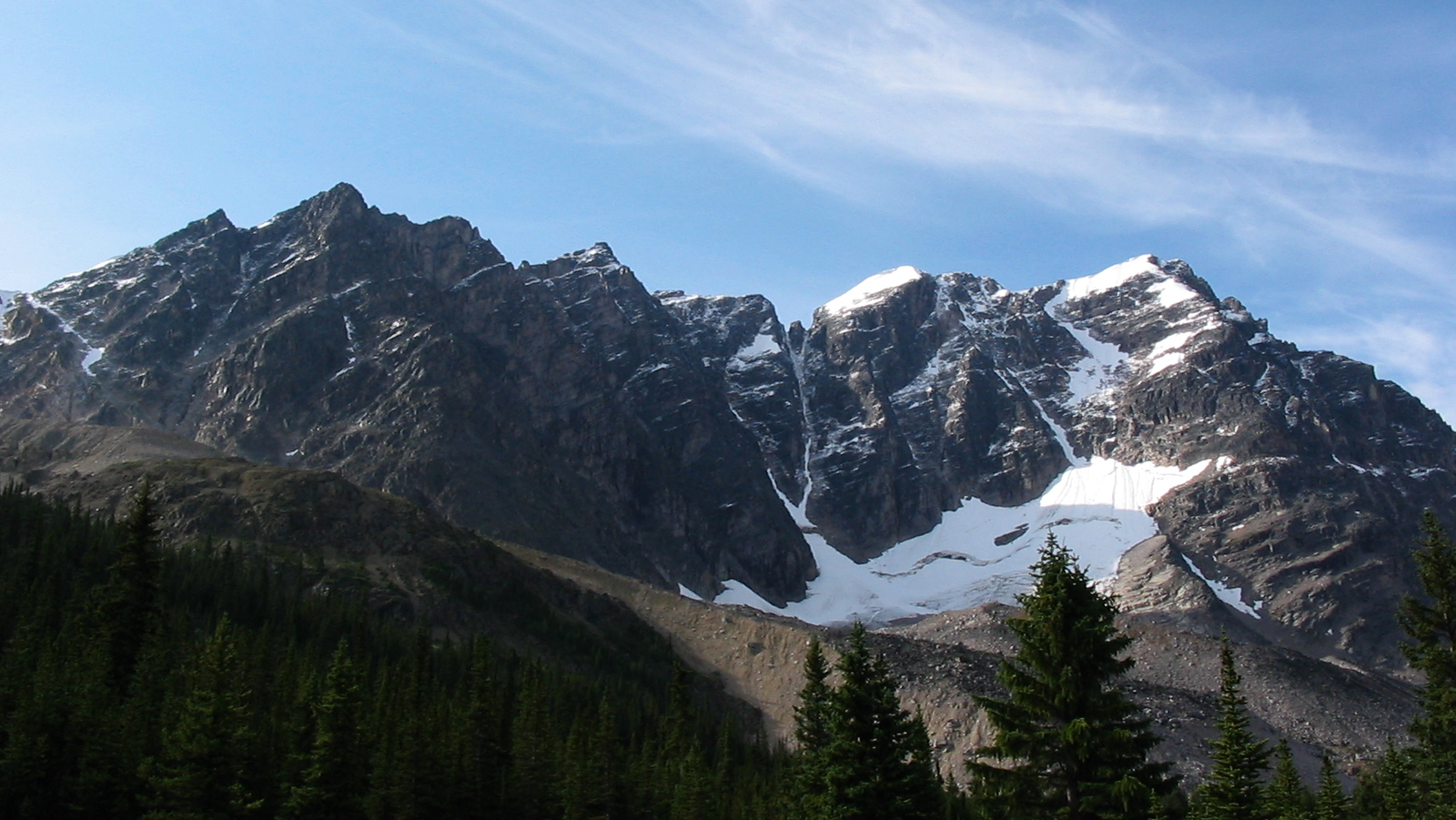
Xerxes Peak

== See also ==
- List of mountains in the Canadian Rockies
