= Catacombs Mountain =

Mountain in Jasper NP, Alberta, Canada

- Location within Alberta Location within Canada

Highest point
- Elevation: 3,290 m (10,790 ft)
- Prominence: 870 m (2,850 ft)
- Listing: Mountains of Alberta
- Coordinates: 52°25′47″N 117°45′10″W

Geography
- Location: Jasper National Park; Alberta, Canada
- Parent range: Canadian Rockies
- Topo map: NTS 83C5 Fortress Lake

Geology
- Rock type: Sedimentary

Climbing
- First ascent: July 10, 1927 W.R. MacLaurin, Alfred. J. Ostheimer, Hans Fuhrer, J. Weber
- Easiest route: Scrambling

Catacombs Mountain is a 3,290-metre (10,790-foot) mountain summit located in the Athabasca River valley of Jasper National Park, in the Canadian Rockies of Alberta, Canada.

Catacombs Mountain was named by Arthur O. Wheeler in 1921 on account of an alcove formation which resembles the recesses in catacombs.

== Climate ==
Based on the Köppen climate classification, Catacombs Mountain is located in a subarctic climate with cold, snowy winters, and mild summers. Temperatures can drop below -20 °C with wind chill factors below -30 °C. Precipitation runoff from the mountain drains into tributaries of the Athabasca River.

== Geology ==
Catacombs Mountain is composed of sedimentary rock laid down from the Precambrian to Jurassic periods. Formed in shallow seas, this sedimentary rock was pushed east and over the top of younger rock during the Laramide orogeny.

== See also ==
- List of mountains of Canada
- Geology of the Rocky Mountains
