= Mount Fryatt =

Mountain in Jasper National Park, Alberta, Canada

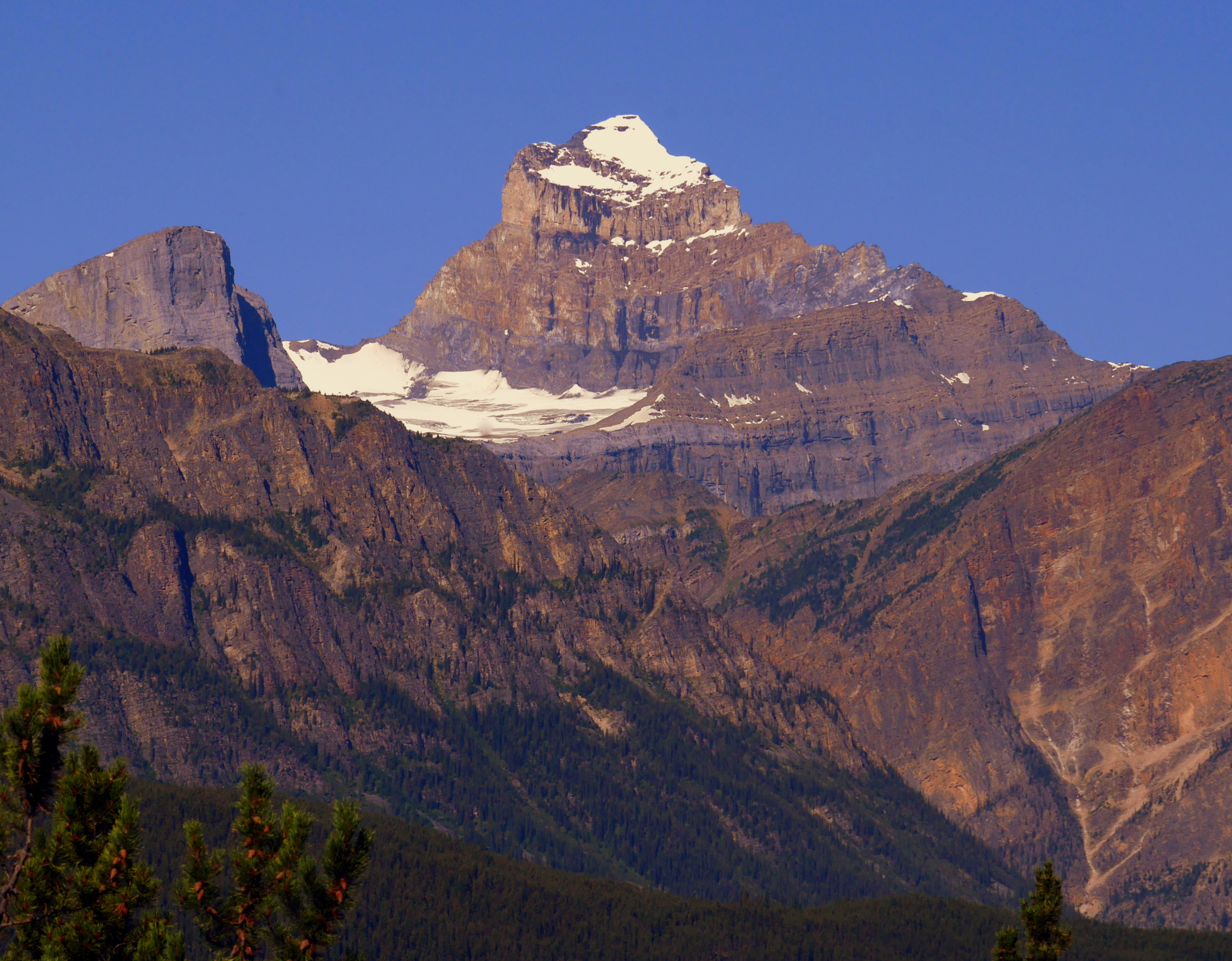

Highest point
- Elevation: 3,361 m (11,027 ft)
- Prominence: 1,608 m (5,276 ft)
- Parent peak: Mount Edith Cavell
- Listing: Canada highest major peaks 48th; Canada prominent peaks 104th; Mountains of Alberta
- Coordinates: 52°33′00″N 117°54′37″W

Geography
- Location within Alberta Location within Canada
- Country: Canada
- Province: Alberta
- Protected area: Jasper National Park
- Parent range: Park Ranges
- Topo map: NTS 83C12 Athabasca Falls

Climbing
- First ascent: 1926 J. Hickson; H. Palmer; H. Fuhrer
- Easiest route: South-West Face (Normal Route) II 5.4; West Ridge Direct III 5.8

Mount Fryatt is Alberta's 26th highest peak. In 1920, it was named after Captain Charles Fryatt, a British merchant seaman who was executed by the Germans during World War I. It lies within peaks that are between the Athabasca and Whirlpool Rivers in Jasper National Park.

The first ascent was made in 1926 by J. W. A. Hickson, Howard Palmer and the guide Hans Fuhrer. The route they took, the South-West Face route, is now the normal line of ascent and descent.

== Geology ==
Mount Fryatt is composed of sedimentary rock laid down from the Precambrian to Jurassic periods. Formed in shallow seas, this sedimentary rock was pushed east and over the top of younger rock during the Laramide orogeny.

== Climate ==
Based on the Köppen climate classification, Mount Fryatt is located in a subarctic climate with cold, snowy winters, and mild summers. Temperatures can drop below -20 °C with wind chill factors below -30 °C. Precipitation runoff from Mount Fryatt drains into tributaries of the Athabasca River.

== Gallery ==
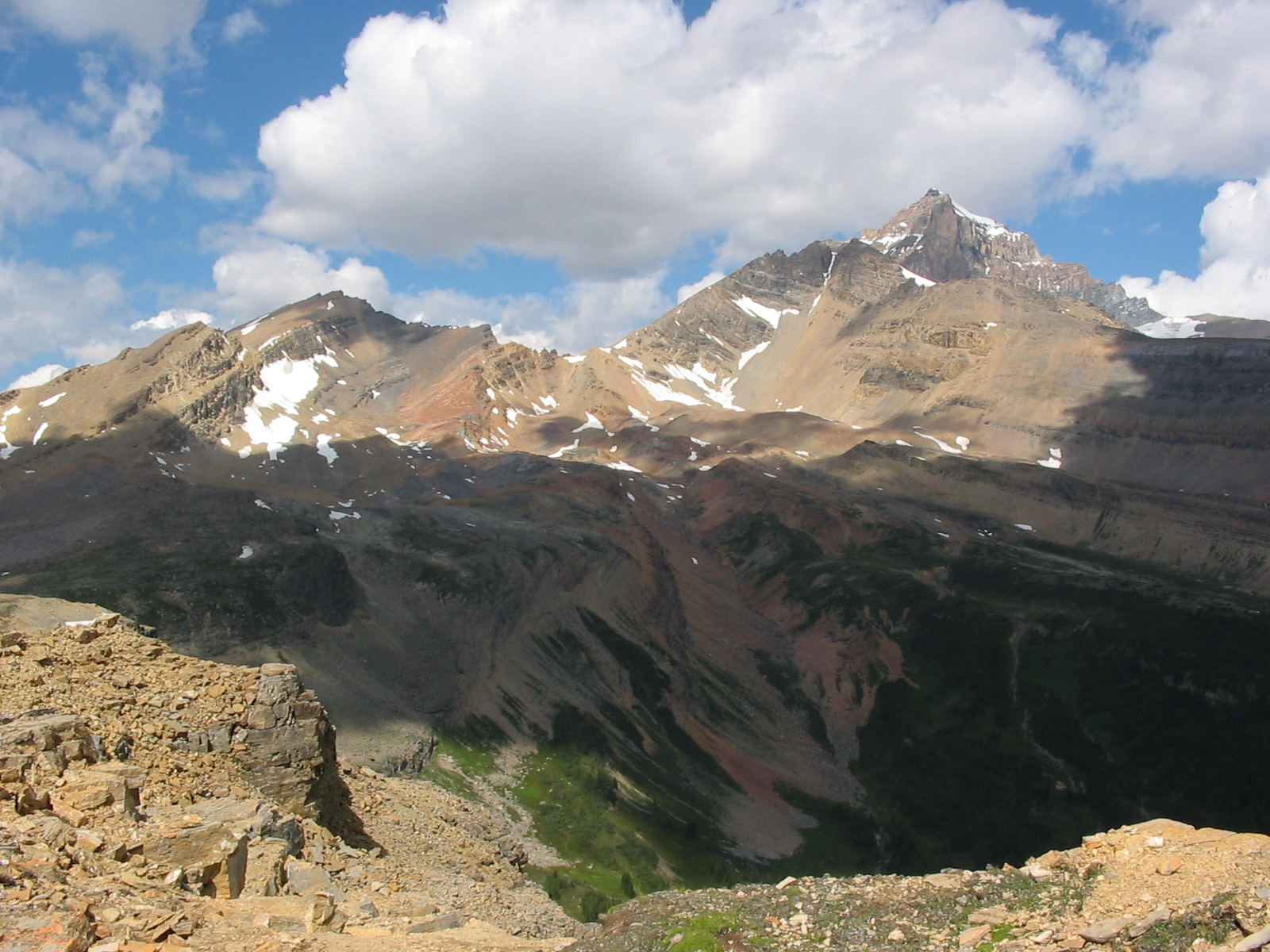
Mount Fryatt from Fryatt Valley

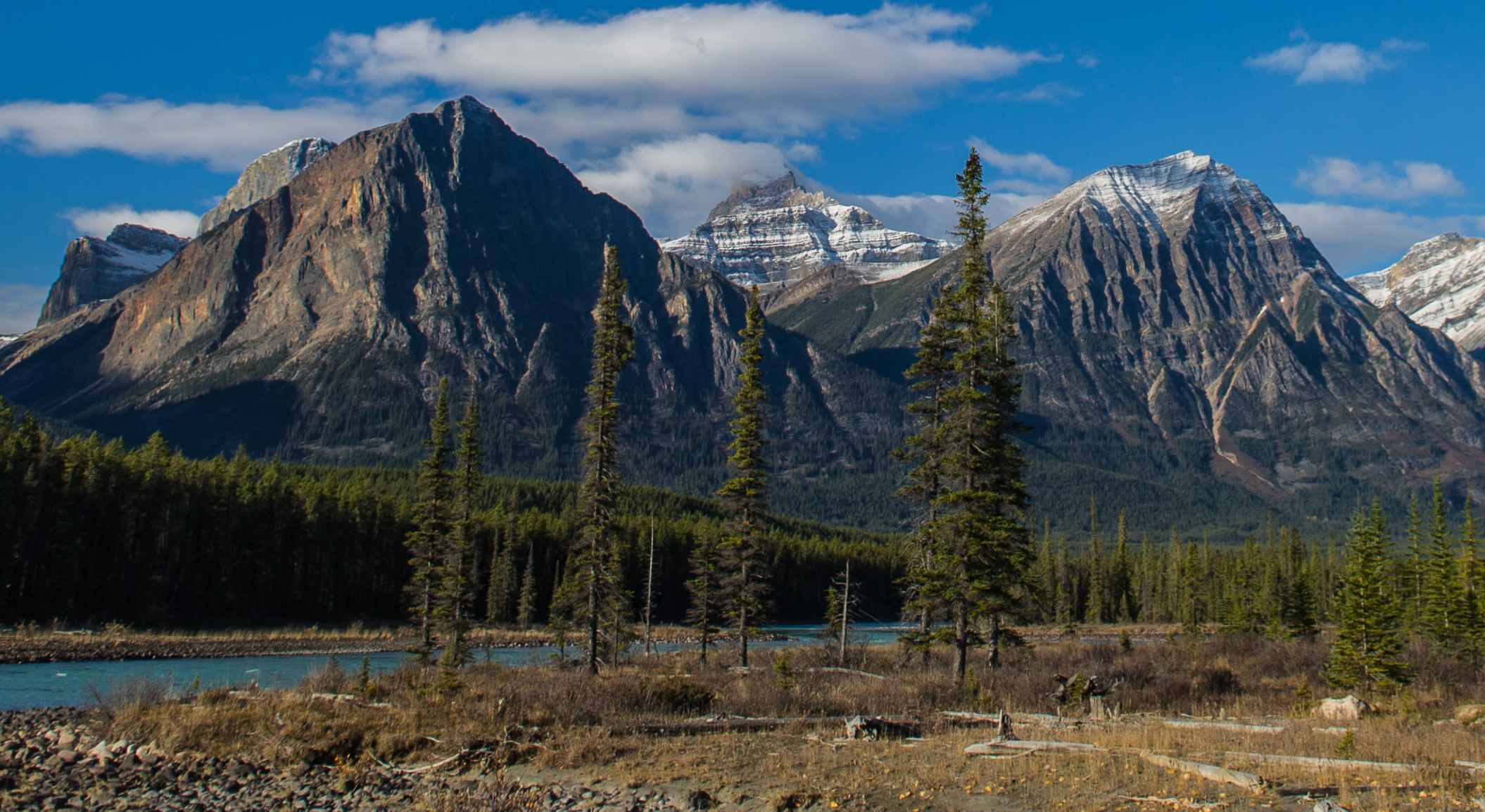
Mount Fryatt centered behind its outliers as seen from the Icefields Parkway

== See also ==
- Brussels Peak
- Geology of Alberta
- List of mountains in the Canadian Rockies
