= Mount Lowell =

Mountain in Jasper National Park, Alberta, Canada

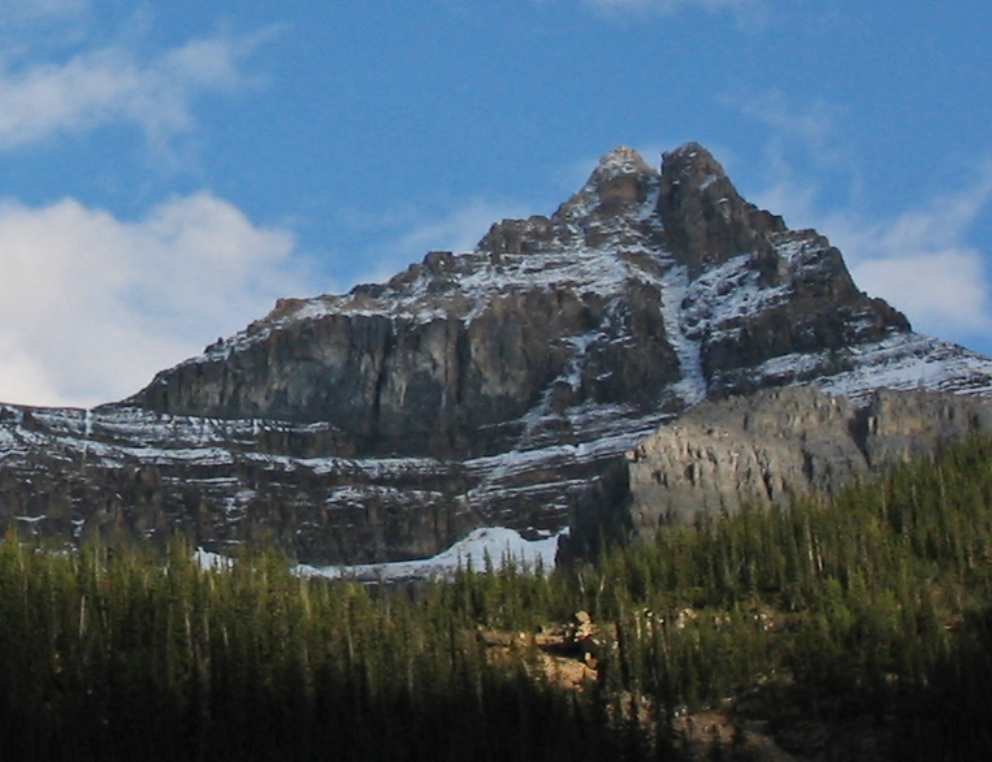
- Mount Lowell seen from Fryatt Valley area

Highest point
- Elevation: 3,150 m (10,330 ft)
- Prominence: 370 m (1,210 ft)
- Parent peak: Brussels Peak (3161 m)
- Listing: Mountains of Alberta
- Coordinates: 52°30′15″N 117°49′56″W

Geography
- Location within Alberta Location within Canada
- Interactive map of Mount Lowell
- Location: Alberta, Canada
- Parent range: Canadian Rockies
- Topo map: NTS 83C12 Athabasca Falls

Geology
- Rock type: Sedimentary

Climbing
- First ascent: 1927 Alfred Ostheimer
- Easiest route: Mountaineering via South Ridge

Mount Lowell is a 3,150-metre (10,330 ft) mountain summit located in the Athabasca River valley of Jasper National Park, in the Canadian Rockies of Alberta, Canada. The name has not been officially adopted yet for this peak. It is situated at the head of Fryatt Creek Valley on the same high ridge as Mount Christie, Xerxes Peak, and Brussels Peak which is the nearest higher peak, 2.0 km (1.2 mi) to the north. Mount Lowell can be seen from the Icefields Parkway.

== History ==
The first ascent of the mountain was made in 1927 by Alfred Ostheimer with guides Hans Fuhrer and J. Weber. Alfred Ostheimer named the peak after A. Lawrence Lowell who was a mountaineer and the president of Harvard University when Ostheimer climbed it.

== Geology ==
Mount Lowell is composed of sedimentary rock laid down from the Precambrian to Jurassic periods, then pushed east and over the top of younger rock during the Laramide orogeny.

== Climate ==
Based on the Köppen climate classification, Mount Lowell is located in a subarctic climate with long, cold, snowy winters, and short mild summers. Temperatures can drop below -20 °C with wind chill factors below -30 °C. Precipitation runoff from Mount Lowell drains into Fryatt Creek and Lick Creek, both tributaries of the Athabasca River.

== Gallery ==
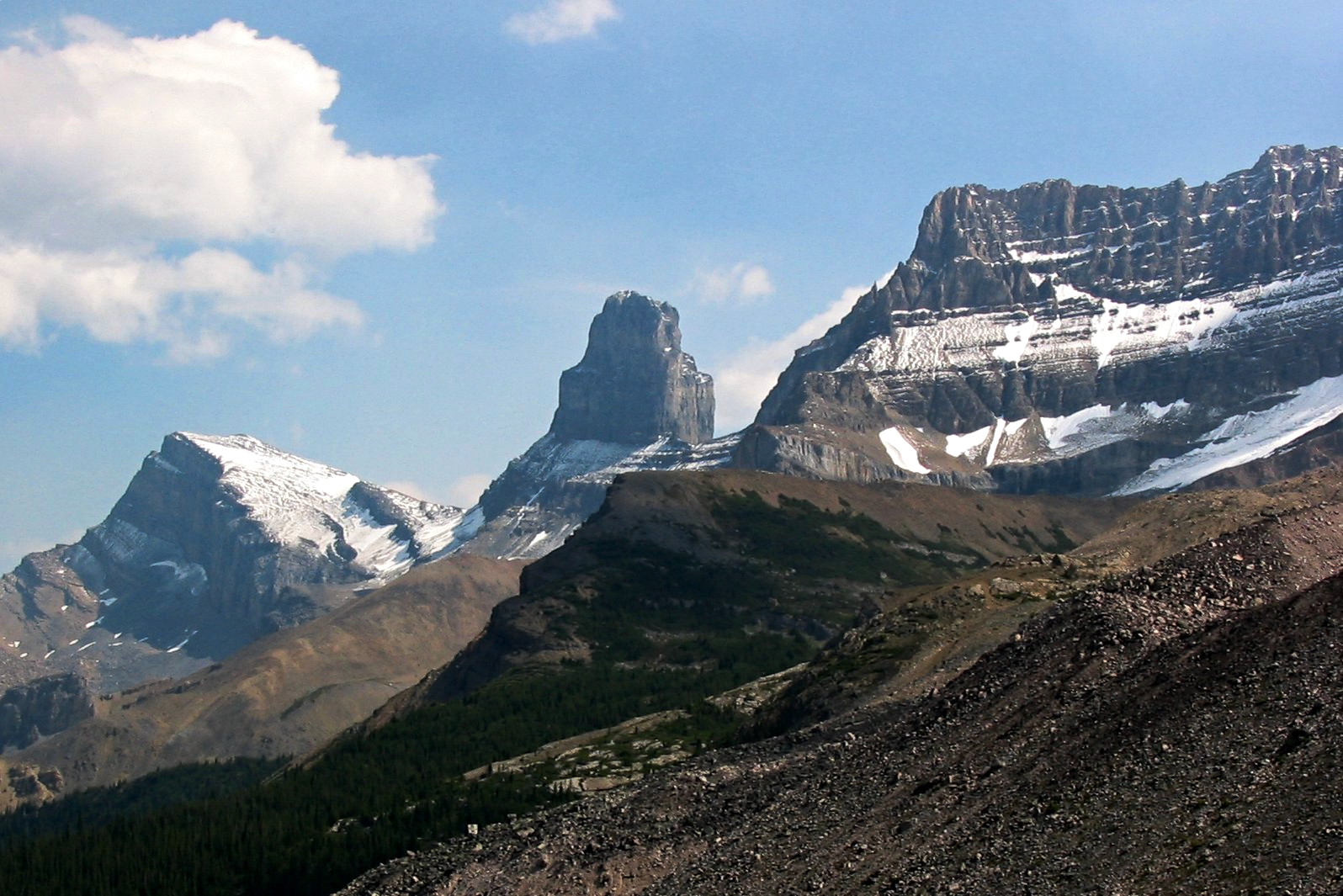
Mount Christie (left), Brussels Peak (center), Mount Lowell (right)

== See also ==
- List of mountains of Canada
- Geology of Alberta
- Geology of the Rocky Mountains
