= Whirlpool River =

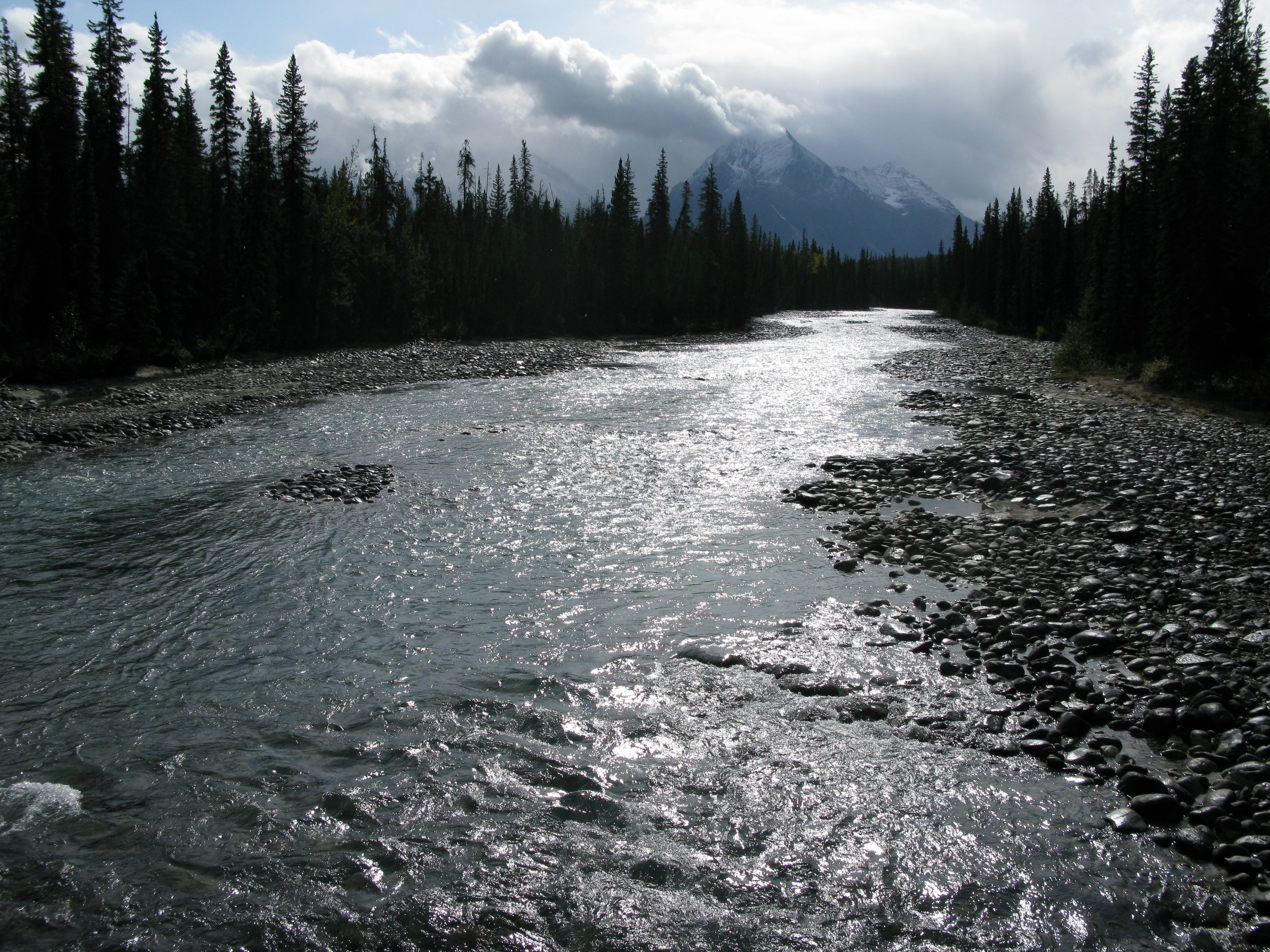
- The Whirlpool River from Alberta Highway 93A

Location
- Country: Canada
- Province: Alberta

Physical characteristics
- Source
  - location: Athabasca Pass
  - coordinates: 52°23′46″N 118°12′15″W
  - elevation: 1,704 m (5,591 ft)
- Mouth
  - location: Athabasca River
  - coordinates: 52°44′06″N 117°57′15″W
  - elevation: 1,121 m (3,678 ft)

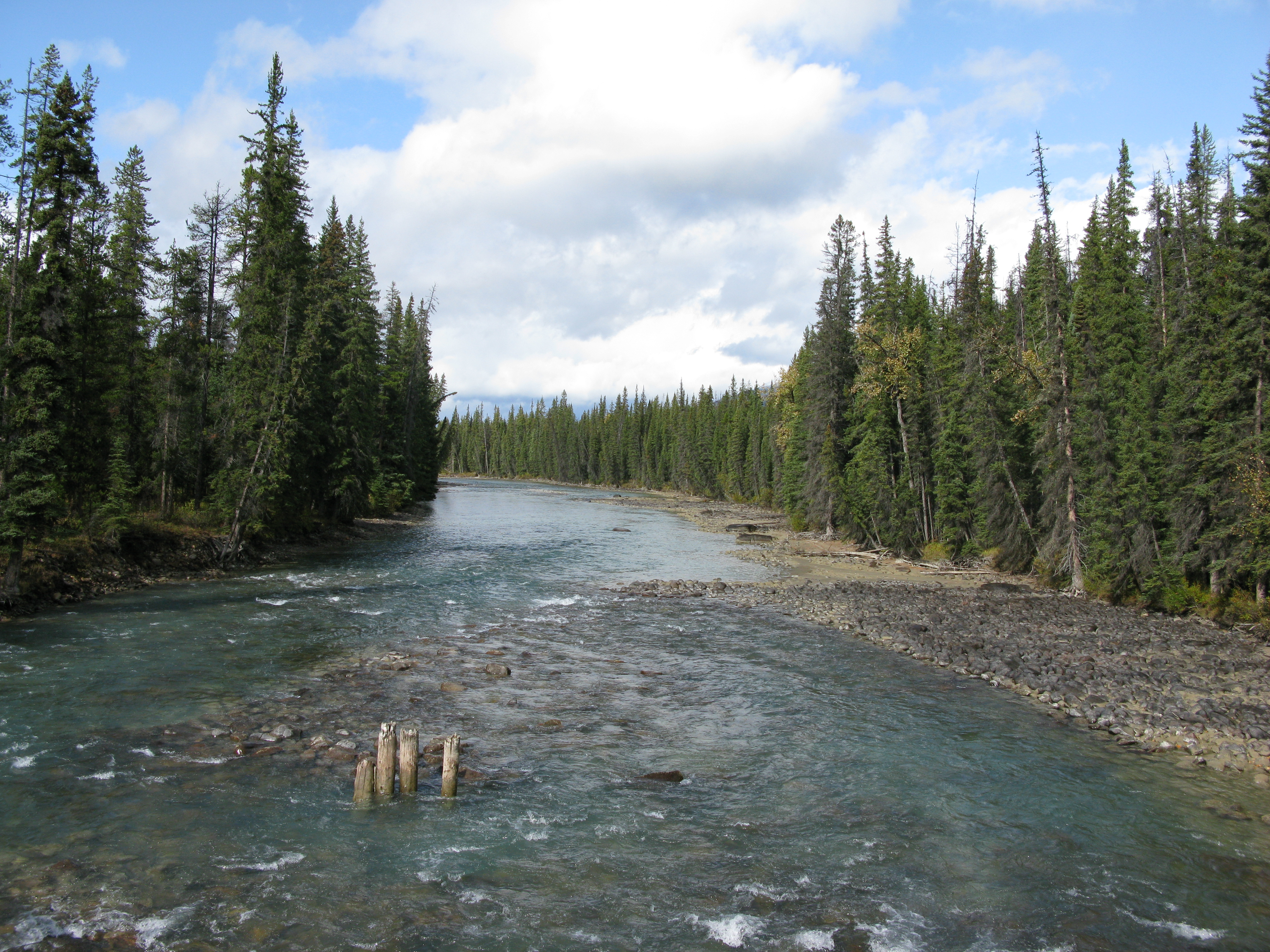
The Whirlpool in Jasper National Park

The Whirlpool River is a short river in Jasper National Park, Alberta, Canada. It is an early tributary of the Athabasca River.

The Whirlpool is formed in Athabasca Pass, collecting meltwater from the Hooker Icefield and the Mount Brown Icefield. It flows north, collecting the Middle Whirlpool River before passing under Alberta Highway 93A and flowing into the Athabasca River south of Jasper. The Moab Lake Road parallels the Whirlpool near its confluence with the Athabasca River.

The Whirlpool was named by Sir James Hector in 1859. He noted the presence of many eddies in the river.

== Tributaries ==
- Scott Creek
- Ross Cox Creek
- Middle Whirlpool River
- Divergence Creek
- Simon Creek

== See also ==
- List of Alberta rivers
