= Brussels Peak =

Mountain in Alberta, Canada

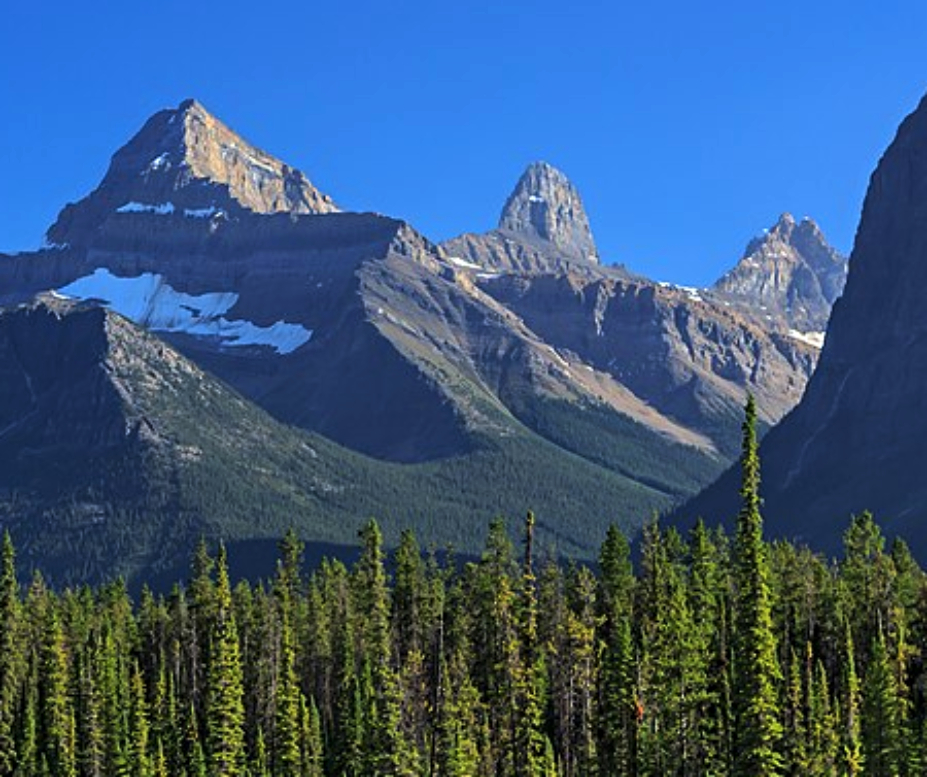
- Brussels Peak centered between Mount Christie (left) and Mount Lowell (right)

Highest point
- Elevation: 3,161 m (10,371 ft)
- Prominence: 671 m (2,201 ft)
- Parent peak: Mount Fryatt
- Listing: Mountains of Alberta
- Coordinates: 52°31′02″N 117°49′21″W

Geography
- Location within Alberta
- Location: Alberta, Canada
- Parent range: Canadian Rockies
- Topo map: NTS 83C12 Athabasca Falls

Climbing
- First ascent: 1948 by R. Garner and J. Lewis

Brussels Peak is a 3,161-metre (10,371 ft) mountain summit located in the Athabasca River valley of Jasper National Park, in the Canadian Rockies of Alberta, Canada. The nearest higher peak is Mount Fryatt, 6.75 km (4.19 mi) to the northwest. Brussels Peak can be seen from the Icefields Parkway.

Brussels Peak was named after the ship SS Brussels.

== Climate ==
Based on the Köppen climate classification, Brussels Peak is located in a subarctic climate with cold, snowy winters, and mild summers. Temperatures can drop below −20 °C with wind chill factors below −30 °C. Precipitation runoff from Brussels Peak drains into the Athabasca River.

== See also ==
- Geography of Alberta
