= Mount Christie (Alberta) =

Mountain in Alberta, Canada

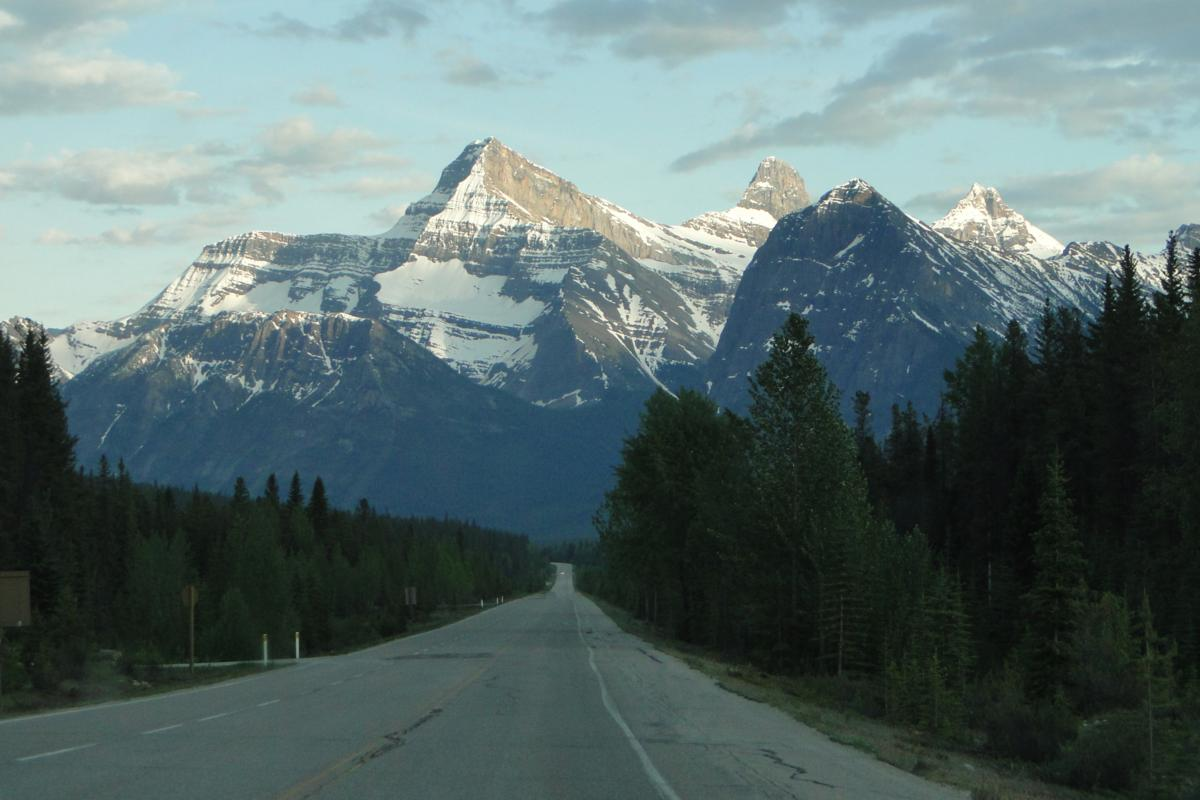
- Mount Christie centered above the Icefields Parkway with Brussels Peak to its right and Mount Lowell furthest to right

Highest point
- Elevation: 3,103 m (10,180 ft)
- Prominence: 303 m (994 ft)
- Parent peak: Brussels Peak (3,161 m)
- Listing: Mountains of Alberta
- Coordinates: 52°31′52″N 117°48′39″W

Geography
- Location within Alberta Location within Canada
- Location: Alberta, Canada
- Parent range: Canadian Rockies
- Topo map: NTS 83C12 Athabasca Falls

Geology
- Rock type: Sedimentary

Climbing
- First ascent: 1930 by W.R. Hainsworth, J.F. Lehmann, M.M. Strumia, N.D. Waffl

Mount Christie is a 3,103-metre (10,180 ft) mountain summit located in the Athabasca River valley of Jasper National Park, in the Canadian Rockies of Alberta, Canada. The nearest higher peak is Brussels Peak, 1.67 km (1.04 mi) to the south-southwest. Mount Christie can be seen from the Icefields Parkway.

== History ==
The mountain was named by James Hector in 1859 for William J. Christie, a Canadian explorer and politician. Christie was the Chief factor at the Hudson's Bay Company in Fort Edmonton when Hector and the Palliser expedition wintered there in 1858–1859. The first ascent of the mountain was made in 1930 by W.R. Hainsworth, J.F. Lehmann, M.M. Strumia, and N.D. Waffl. The mountain's name was officially adopted as Mount Christie in 1947 by the Geographical Names Board of Canada.

== Geology ==
Mount Christie is composed of sedimentary rock laid down from the Precambrian to Jurassic periods. Formed in shallow seas, this sedimentary rock was pushed east and over the top of younger rock during the Laramide orogeny.

== Climate ==
Based on the Köppen climate classification, Mount Christie is located in a subarctic climate zone with cold, snowy winters, and mild summers. Winter temperatures can drop below -20 °C with wind chill factors below -30 °C. Precipitation runoff from Mount Christie drains into the Athabasca River.

== Gallery ==
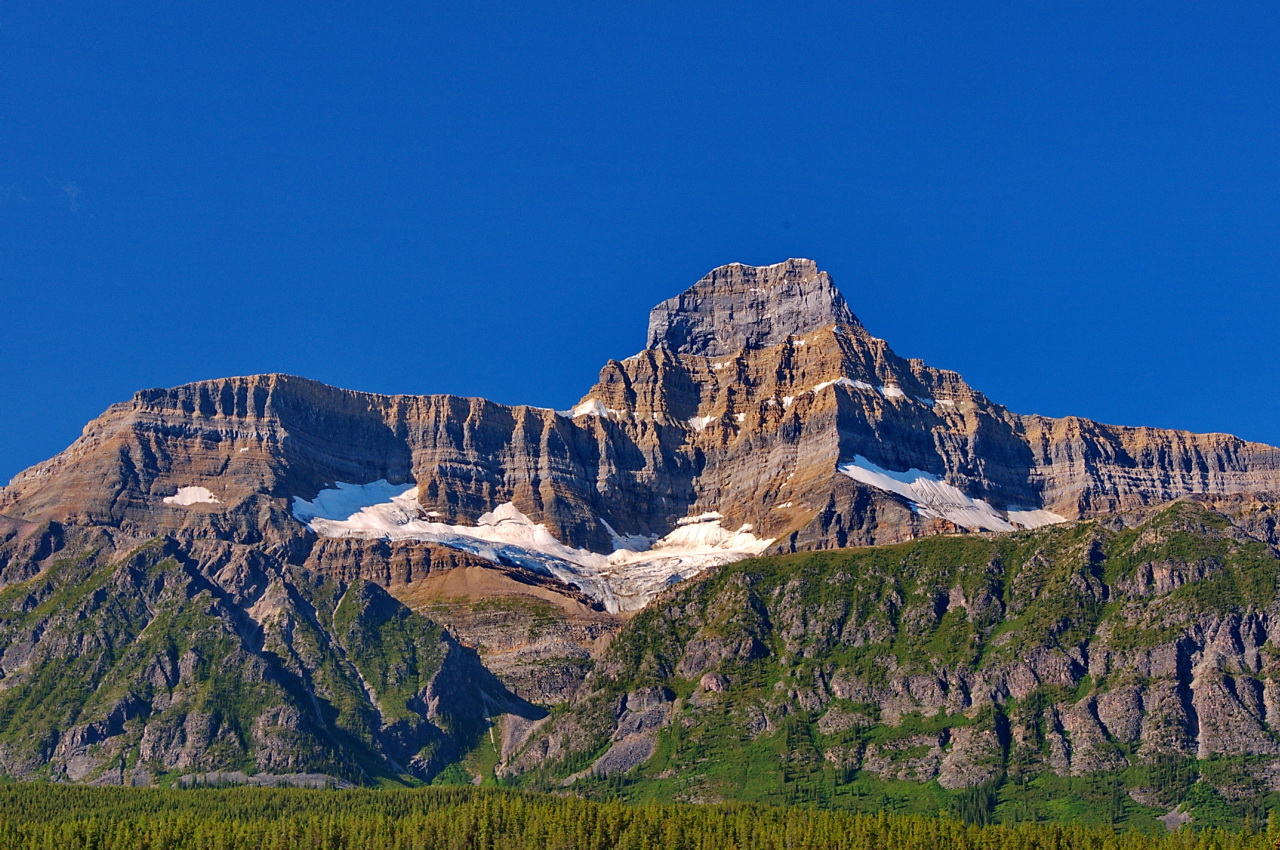
Mount Christie

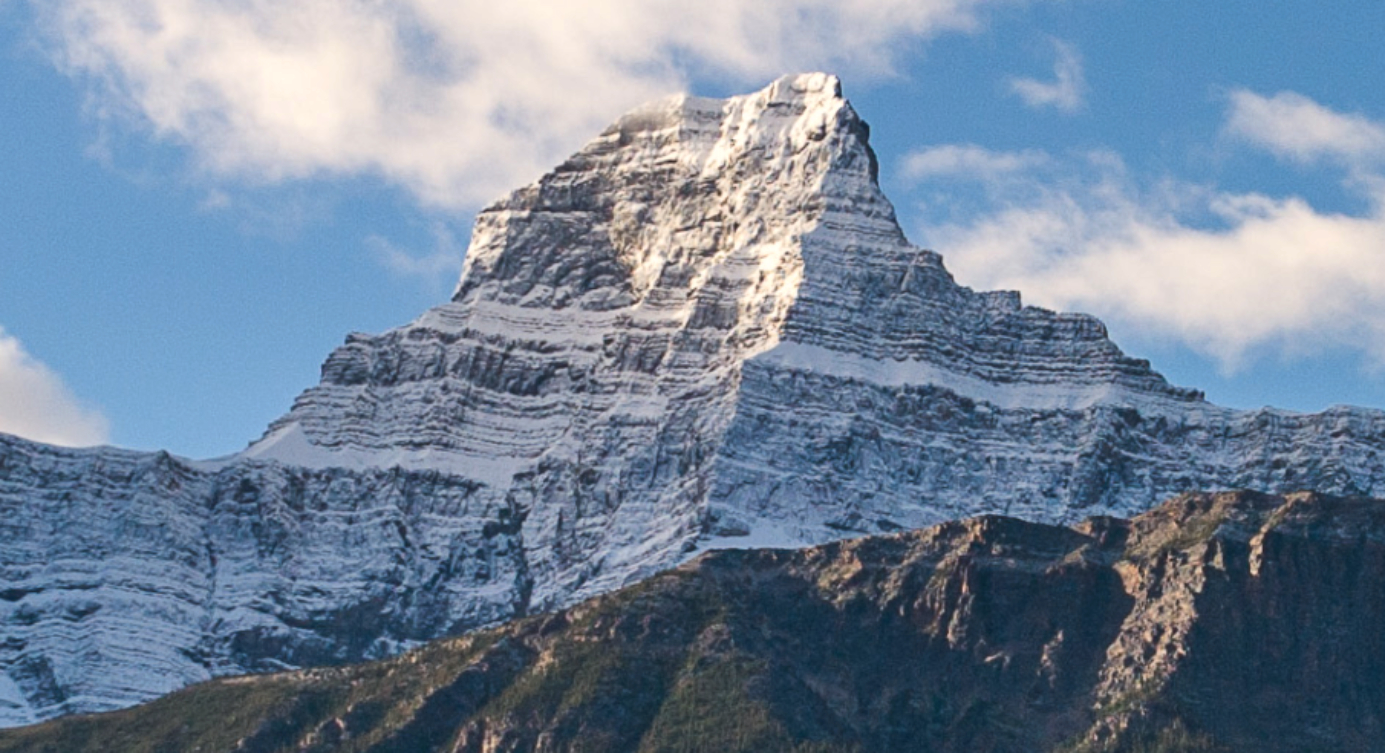
Mount Christie

== See also ==
- List of mountains of Canada
- Geology of the Rocky Mountains
