= Mount Wilson (Alberta) =

Mountain in Banff National Park, Alberta, Canada

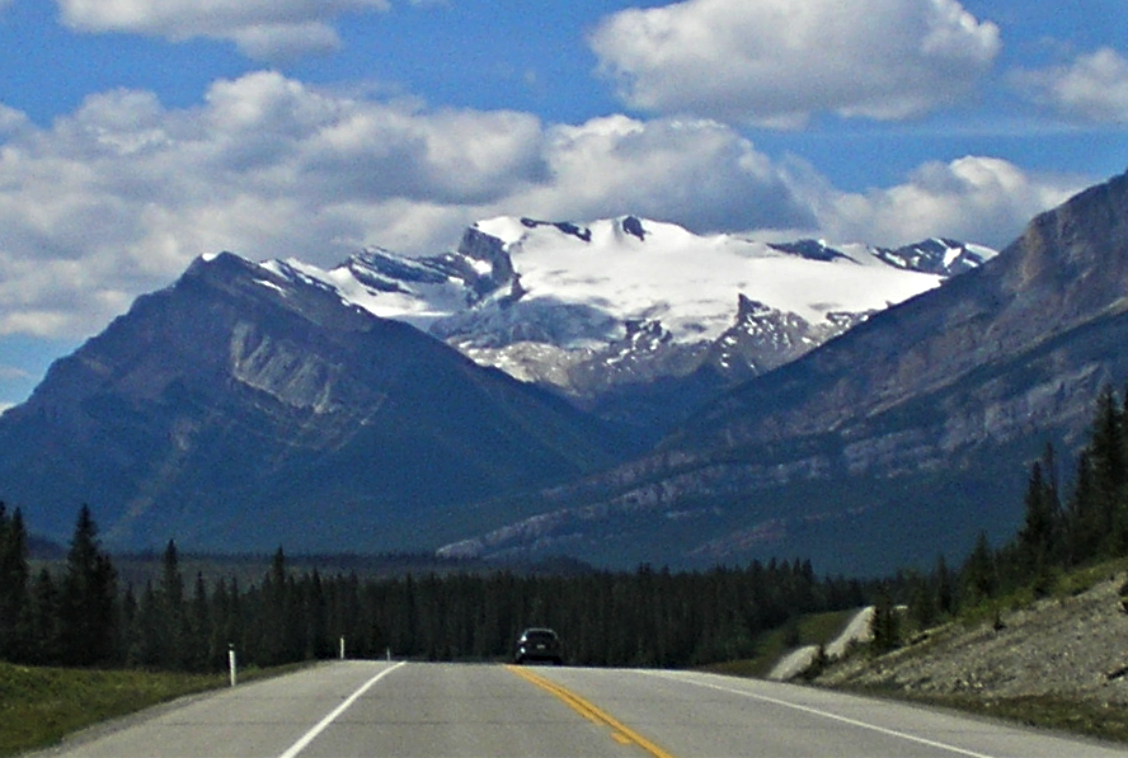
- Mount Wilson and Wilson Icefield seen from the David Thompson Highway

Highest point
- Elevation: 3,260 m (10,700 ft)
- Prominence: 780 m (2,560 ft)
- Parent peak: Mount Cline (3361 m)
- Listing: Mountains of Alberta
- Coordinates: 52°01′04″N 116°48′04″W

Geography
- Location within Alberta Location within Canada
- Interactive map of Mount Wilson
- Country: Canada
- Province: Alberta
- Parent range: Cline Range; Canadian Rockies
- Topo map: NTS 83C2 Cline River

Geology
- Rock type: Sedimentary

Climbing
- First ascent: 1902 by Outram and Kaufmann
- Easiest route: technical climb

Mount Wilson is a 3,260-metre (10,696 ft) mountain summit located in the North Saskatchewan River valley of Banff National Park, in the Canadian Rockies of Alberta, Canada. Its nearest higher peak is Mount Cline, 9.81 km (6.10 mi) to the northeast. Mount Wilson is situated immediately north of the confluence of the North Saskatchewan River, Mistaya River, and Howse River near Saskatchewan Crossing, where the Icefields Parkway intersects with the David Thompson Highway.

== History ==
Mount Wilson honours Tom Wilson (1859–1933) who was an early explorer in the Canadian Rockies. The mountain was named in 1898 by Norman Collie. The first ascent of the mountain was made in 1902 by James Outram and Christian Kaufmann. The mountain's name was officially adopted in 1924 by the Geographical Names Board of Canada.

== Geology ==
Like other mountains in Banff Park, Mount Wilson is composed of sedimentary rock laid down from the Precambrian to Jurassic periods. Formed in shallow seas, this sedimentary rock was pushed east and over the top of younger rock during the Laramide orogeny. The west and south aspects of the mountain are characterized by rugged, rocky cliff bands, whereas the north and east aspects of Mount Wilson are covered by expansive glacial ice called the Wilson Icefield.

== Climate ==
Based on the Köppen climate classification, Mount Wilson is located in a subarctic climate zone with cold, snowy winters, and mild summers. Temperatures can drop below −20 °C (−4 °F) with wind chill factors below −30 °C (−22 °F). Weather conditions during winter make Mount Wilson one of the premier places in the Rockies for ice climbing. Precipitation runoff from Mount Wilson drains into tributaries of the Saskatchewan River.

== Ice Climbing Routes ==
Ice Climbing Routes with grades on Mount Wilson:

- Dancing With Chaos – WI6
- Midnight Rambler – WI3
- Wilson Major – WI3-6
- Lady Wilson's Right Tit – WI4
- Lady Wilson's Cleavage – WI3
- Totem Pole – WI5
- Living in Paradise – WI6+
- Suntori – WI6
- Skinny Puppy – WI5
- Phil Spectre's Nightmare – WI6
- Mixed Monster – M8 WI5+

== Gallery ==
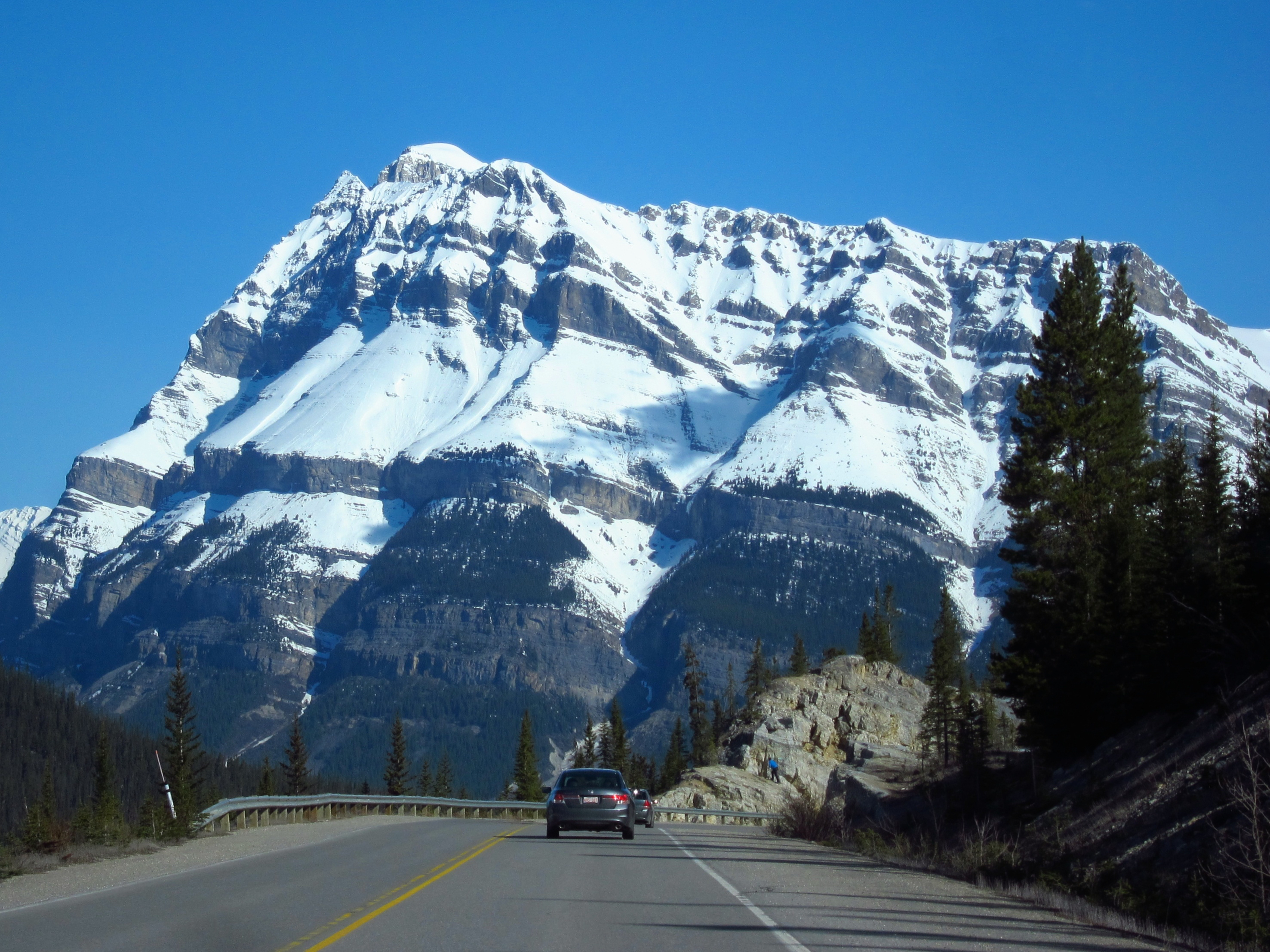
Mt. Wilson from northbound Icefields Parkway

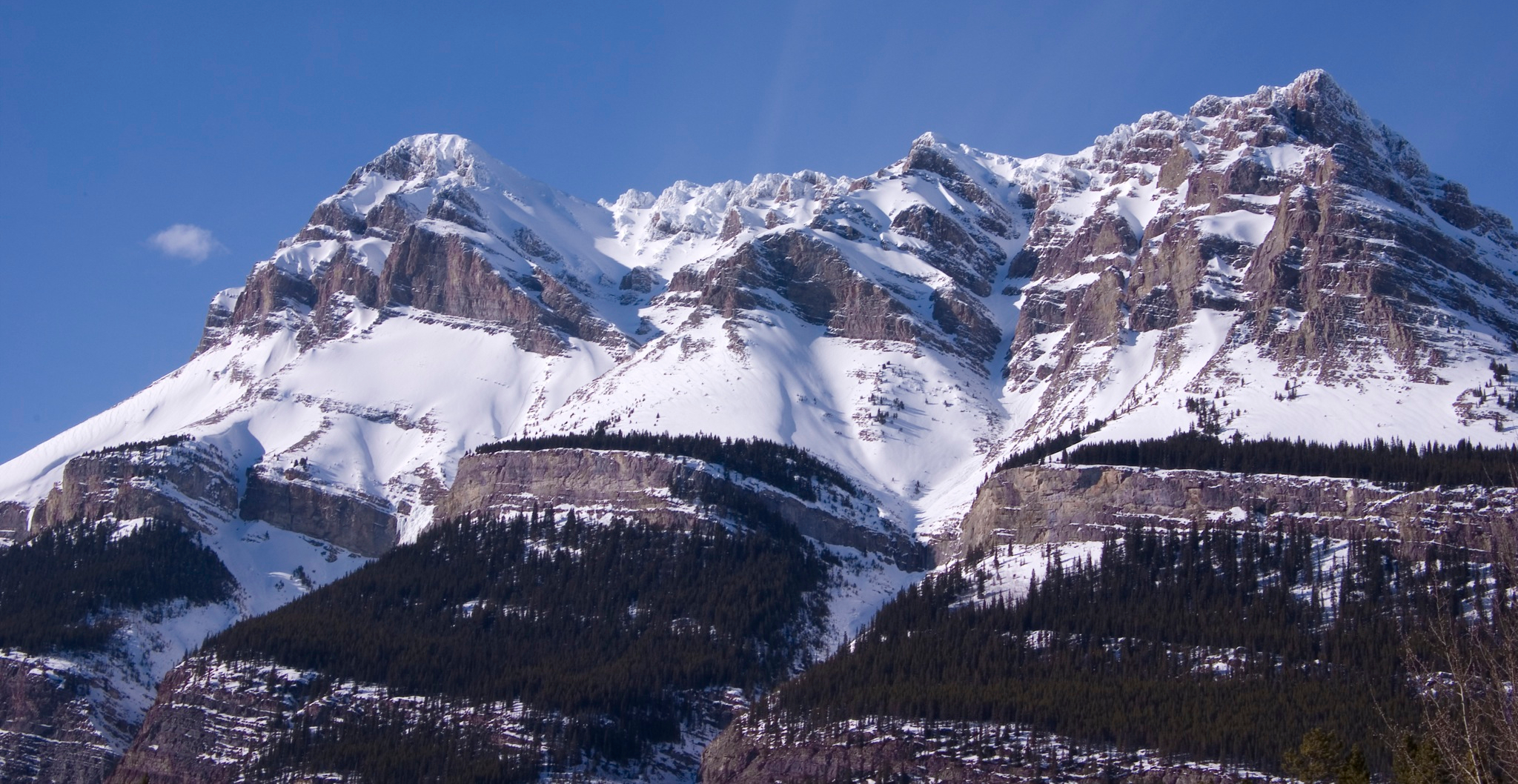
Mount Wilson

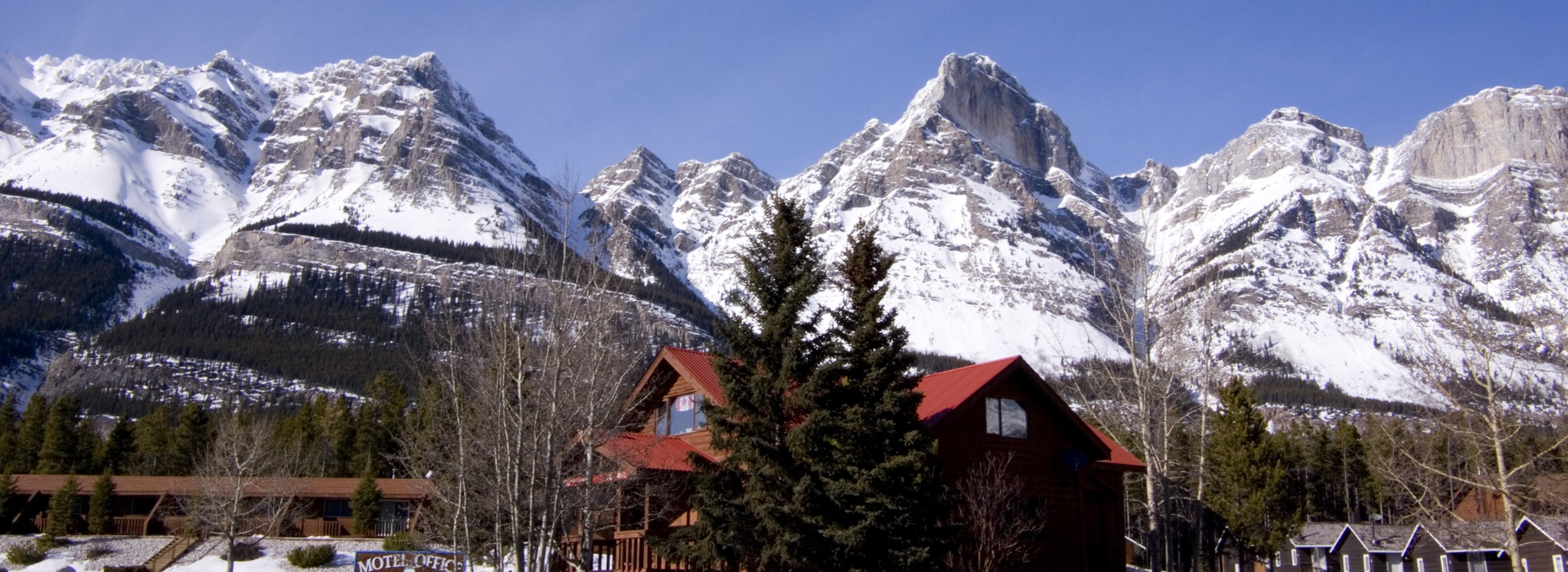
Mount Wilson's lower cliffs seen from Saskatchewan Crossing

== See also ==
- List of mountains in the Canadian Rockies
- Geography of Alberta
