= Resolute Mountain =

Mountain in Alberta, Canada

- Lion Peak
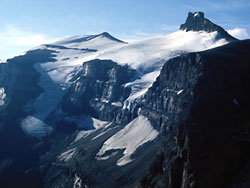
- Resolute Mountain from the North, 2017

Highest point
- Elevation: 3,150 m (10,330 ft)
- Prominence: 395 m (1,296 ft)
- Parent peak: Mount Cline (3361 m)
- Listing: Mountains of Alberta
- Coordinates: 52°04′24″N 116°39′34″W

Geography
- Location within Alberta
- Country: Canada
- Province: Alberta
- Parent range: Cline Range
- Topo map: NTS 83C2 Cline River

Climbing
- First ascent: 1958 A. Hober, E. Hopkins, D.G. Linke

Resolute Mountain is located in David Thompson Country, western Alberta, Canada, 12 km north of Saskatchewan River Crossing. Its line parent is Mount Cline located 2 kilometres to the east.

Resolute has two main peaks, Lion and Lioness. They are each about 3150 m high. Both peaks are glaciated on their northern slopes. Resolute was first ascended in 1958 by A. Hober and E. Hopkins. The easiest route up Resolute is accessible from Alberta Highway 11, where it crosses Thompson creek.
