= Mount Coleman (Alberta) =

Mountain in Banff NP, Alberta, Canada

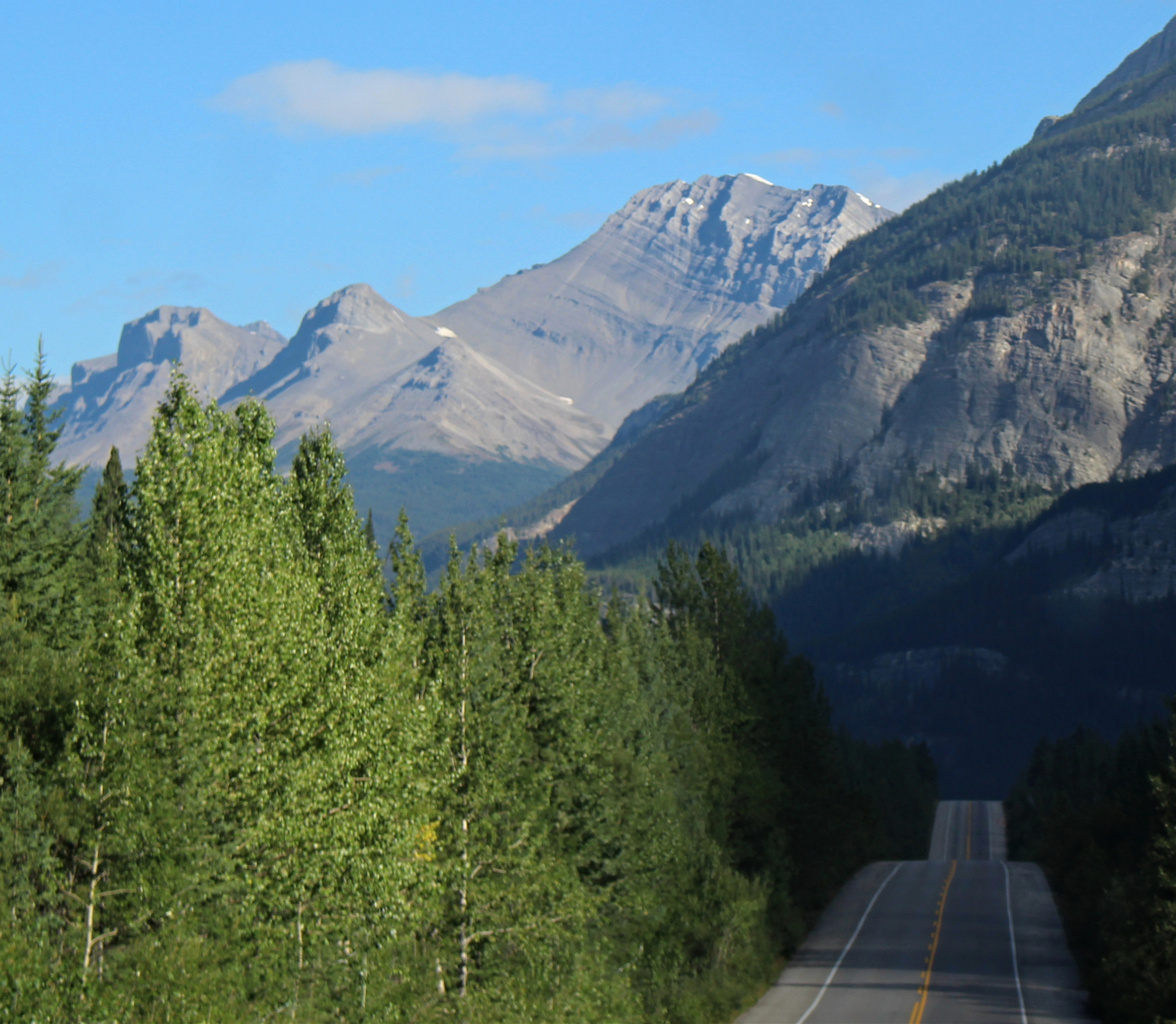
- Mount Coleman (centered in distance) seen from Icefields Parkway

Highest point
- Elevation: 3,135 m (10,285 ft)
- Prominence: 775 m (2,543 ft)
- Parent peak: Cirrus Mountain (3270 m)
- Listing: Mountains of Alberta
- Coordinates: 52°07′08″N 116°55′17″W

Geography
- Location within Alberta Location within Canada
- Country: Canada
- Province: Alberta
- Parent range: Cloister Mountains
- Topo map: NTS 83C2 Cline River

Geology
- Rock type: Sedimentary

Mount Coleman is a 3,135-metre (10,285 ft) mountain summit located in the upper North Saskatchewan River valley in Banff National Park, in the Canadian Rockies of Alberta, Canada. Its nearest higher peak is Cirrus Mountain, 4.46 km (2.77 mi) to the north. Mount Coleman is situated along the east side the Icefields Parkway midway between Saskatchewan Crossing and Sunwapta Pass.

== History ==
Mount Coleman was named in 1898 after Arthur P. Coleman (1852-1939), a Canadian geologist and among the first white men to explore the area that is now Jasper National Park.

== Geology ==
Like other mountains in Banff Park, Mount Coleman is composed of sedimentary rock laid down from the Precambrian to Jurassic periods. Formed in shallow seas, this sedimentary rock was pushed east and over the top of younger rock during the Laramide orogeny.

== Climate ==
Based on the Köppen climate classification, Mount Coleman is located in a subarctic climate with cold, snowy winters, and mild summers. Temperatures can drop below -20 °C with wind chill factors below -30 °C. Precipitation runoff from Mount Coleman drains into tributaries of the North Saskatchewan River.

== Gallery ==
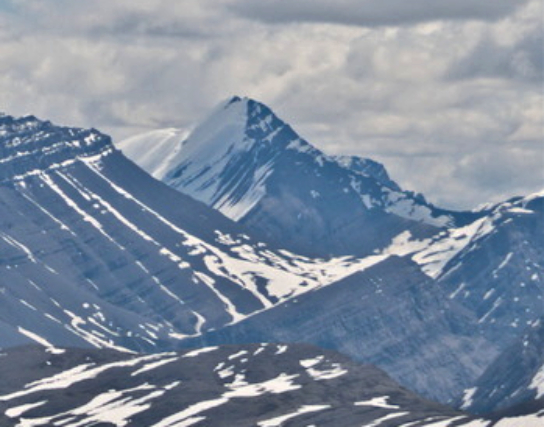

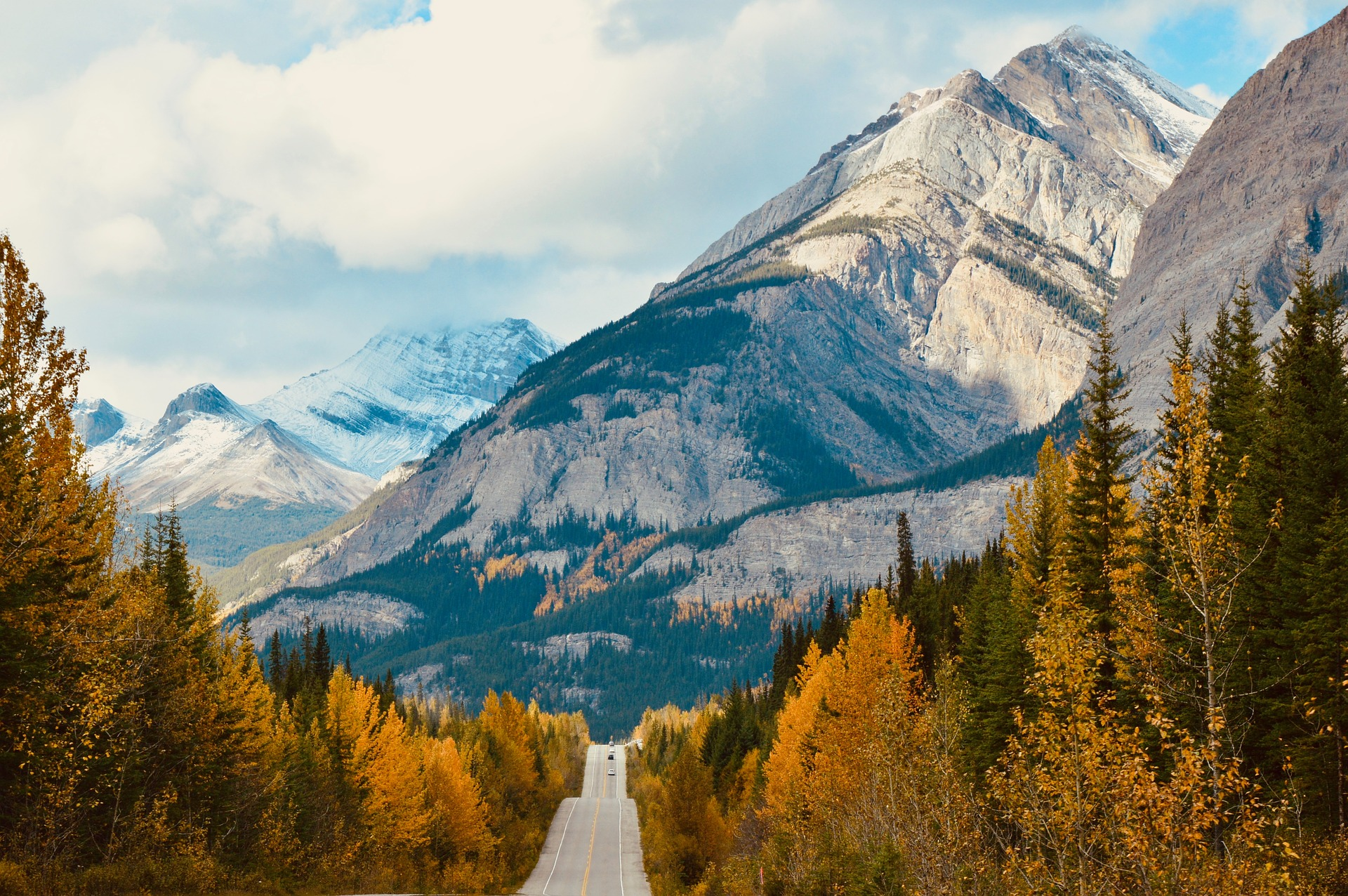
Mount Coleman (left) from Icefields Parkway

== See also ==
- List of mountains in the Canadian Rockies
- Geography of Alberta
