= Mount Murchison (Alberta) =

Mountain in Banff NP, Alberta, Canada

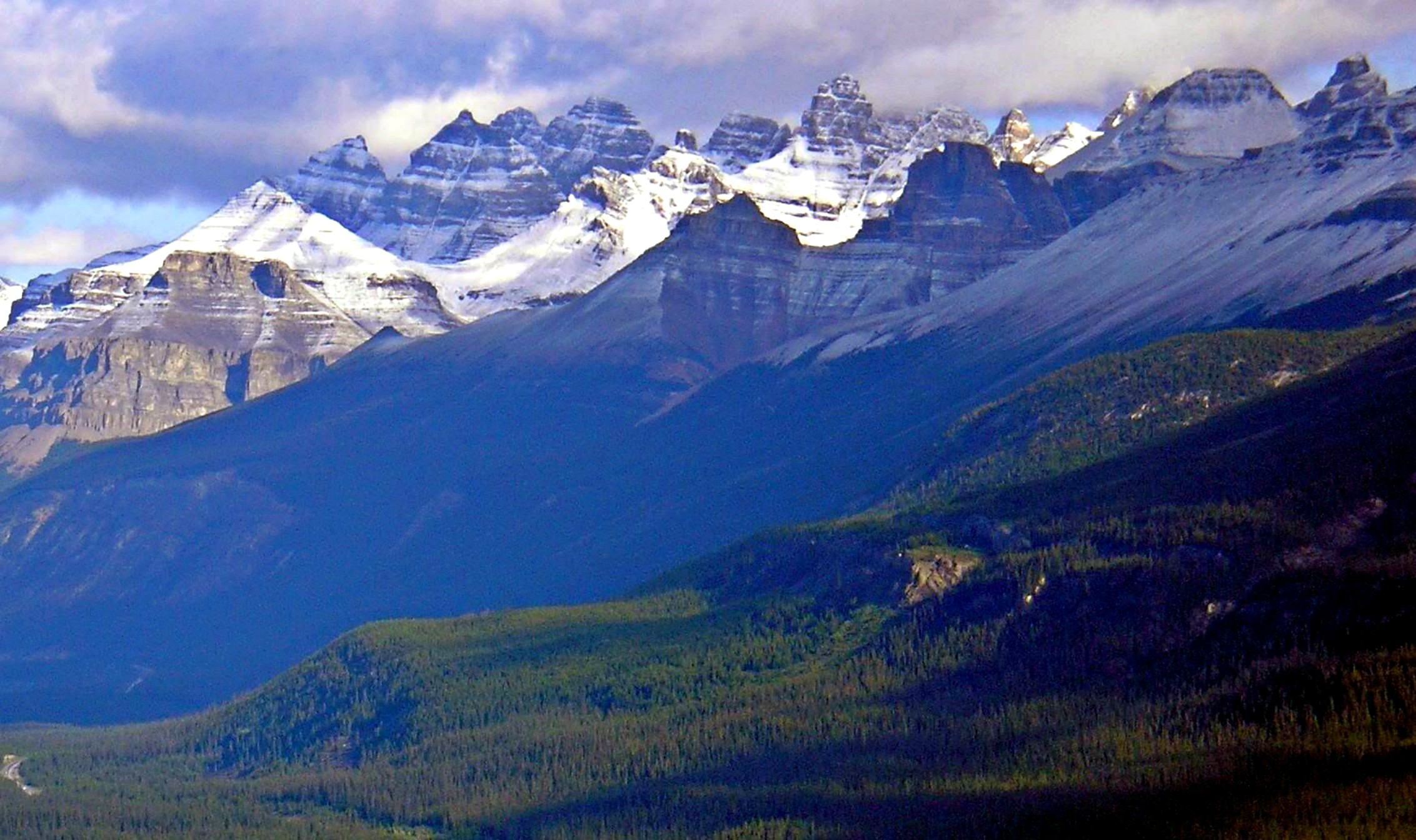
- Mount Murchison seen from Peyto Lake overlook at Bow Pass

Highest point
- Elevation: 3,348 m (10,984 ft)
- Prominence: 988 m (3,241 ft)
- Parent peak: Mount Hector (3394 m)
- Listing: Mountains of Alberta
- Coordinates: 51°55′59″N 116°40′30″W

Naming
- Etymology: Roderick Murchison

Geography
- Location within Alberta Location within Canada
- Interactive map of Mount Murchison
- Location: Alberta, Canada
- Parent range: Murchison Group; Canadian Rockies
- Topo map: NTS 82N15 Mistaya Lake

Geology
- Rock age: Cambrian
- Rock type: Sedimentary

Climbing
- First ascent: August 25, 1996 by Reg Bonney, Rick Collier, John Holmes, Jerre Skvaril
- Easiest route: technical climb

Mount Murchison is a 3,348-metre (10,984 ft) mountain summit located at the convergence of the North Saskatchewan River valley and Mistaya River valley of Banff National Park, in the Canadian Rockies of Alberta, Canada. The main summit has two high points: the Southeast Peak is 3,348 m, whereas the Northwest Peak is 3,333 m and separated by 700 m distance. Its nearest higher peak is Mount Cline, 15.71 km (9.76 mi) to the north. Mount Murchison is situated immediately southeast of the confluence of the North Saskatchewan River, Mistaya River, and Howse River near Saskatchewan Crossing, where the Icefields Parkway intersects with the David Thompson Highway.

== History ==
Named by James Hector as he traversed the Mistaya Valley in September of 1858, Mount Murchison honors Sir Roderick Impey Murchison (1792-1871), a prominent Scottish geologist and director of the Geological Survey of Great Britain. The mountain's name became official in 1924. The first ascent of the Northwest Peak was in 1902 by Norman Collie, H.E.M. Stutfield, G.M. Weed, and Hans Kaufmann. The first ascent of the Southeast Peak was made August 25, 1996, by Reg Bonney, Rick Collier, John Holmes, and Jerre Skvaril.

== Geology ==
Like other mountains in Banff Park, the Murchison massif is composed of sedimentary rock laid down during the Precambrian to Jurassic periods. Formed in shallow seas, this sedimentary rock was pushed east and over the top of younger rock during the Laramide orogeny. The massif, which covers an area measuring five km by seven km (7400 acres), is characterized by seven rocky towers and glacial ice of the Murchison Icefield.

== Towers of Murchison ==
Name	Elevation	Prominence	First Ascent
Hall Tower	3216 m	183 m	1940
Bison Tower	3185 m	183 m	
Cromwell Tower	3213 m	28 m	
Feuz Tower	3124 m	183 m	1941
Gest Tower	3170 m	690 m	1937
South East Tower	3094 m	153 m	1939
Englehard Tower	3216 m	366 m	

== Climate ==
Based on the Köppen climate classification, Mount Murchison is located in a subarctic climate with cold, snowy winters, and mild summers. Temperatures can drop below -20 °C with wind chill factors below -30 °C. Weather conditions during winter make Mount Murchison a destination in the Rockies for ice climbing. Precipitation runoff from Mount Murchison drains into tributaries of the Saskatchewan River.

== Ice Climbing Routes ==
Ice Climbing Routes with grades on Mount Murchison

- But My Daddy's a Psycho - WI5
- Murchison Falls - WI4-5
- Virtual Reality - WI6
- Balfour Wall - WI 2-4
- Cosmic Messenger - WI5
- Imaginary Voyage - WI3
- Laughter in the Dark - WI4
- Alien Abduction - WI5
- Syndrome - WI6

== Gallery ==
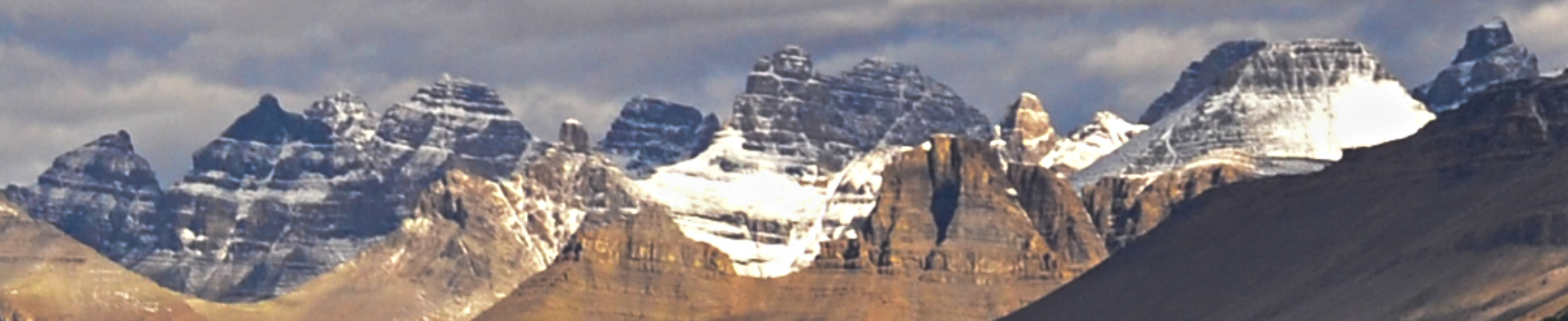
Towers of Murchison

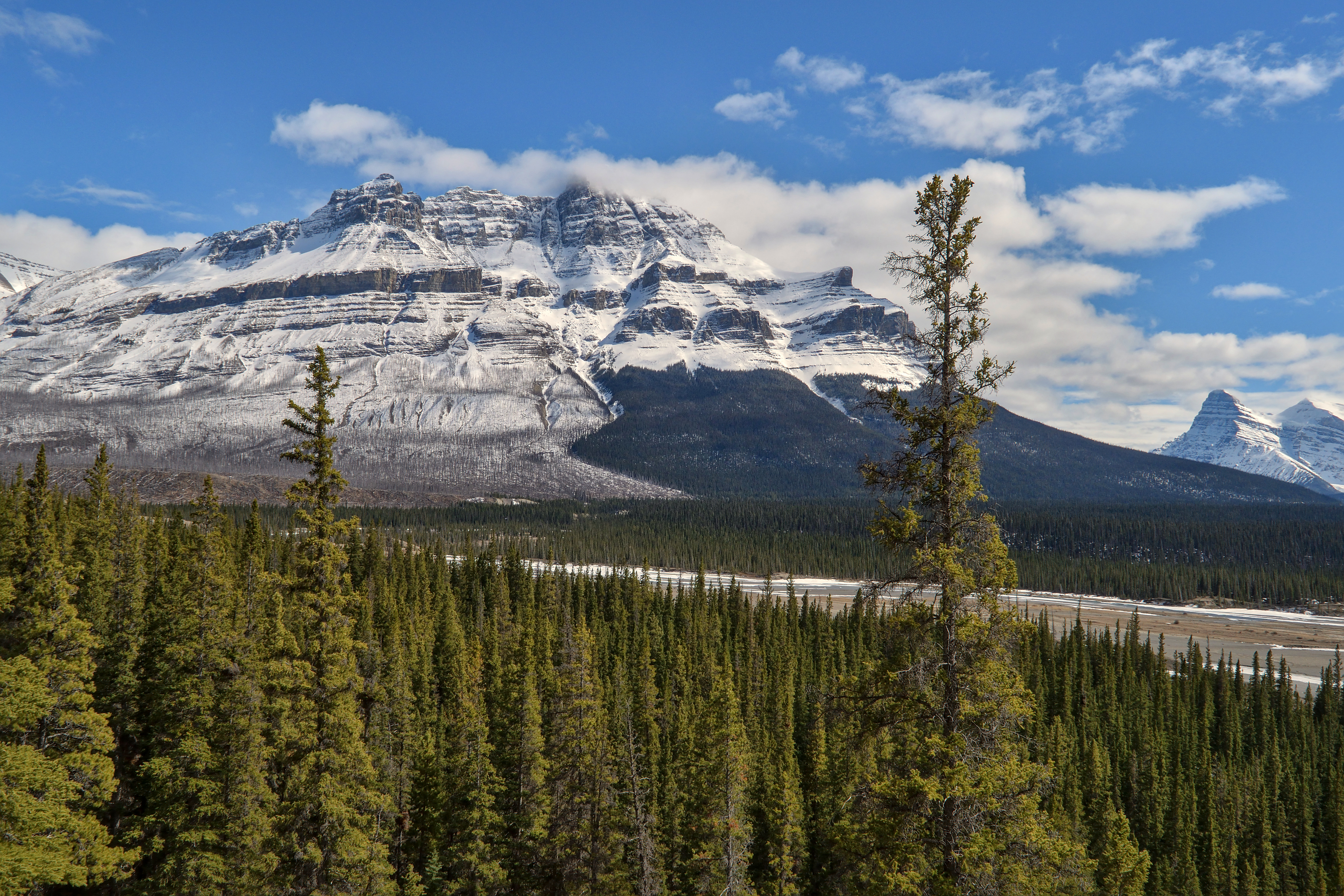
North aspect

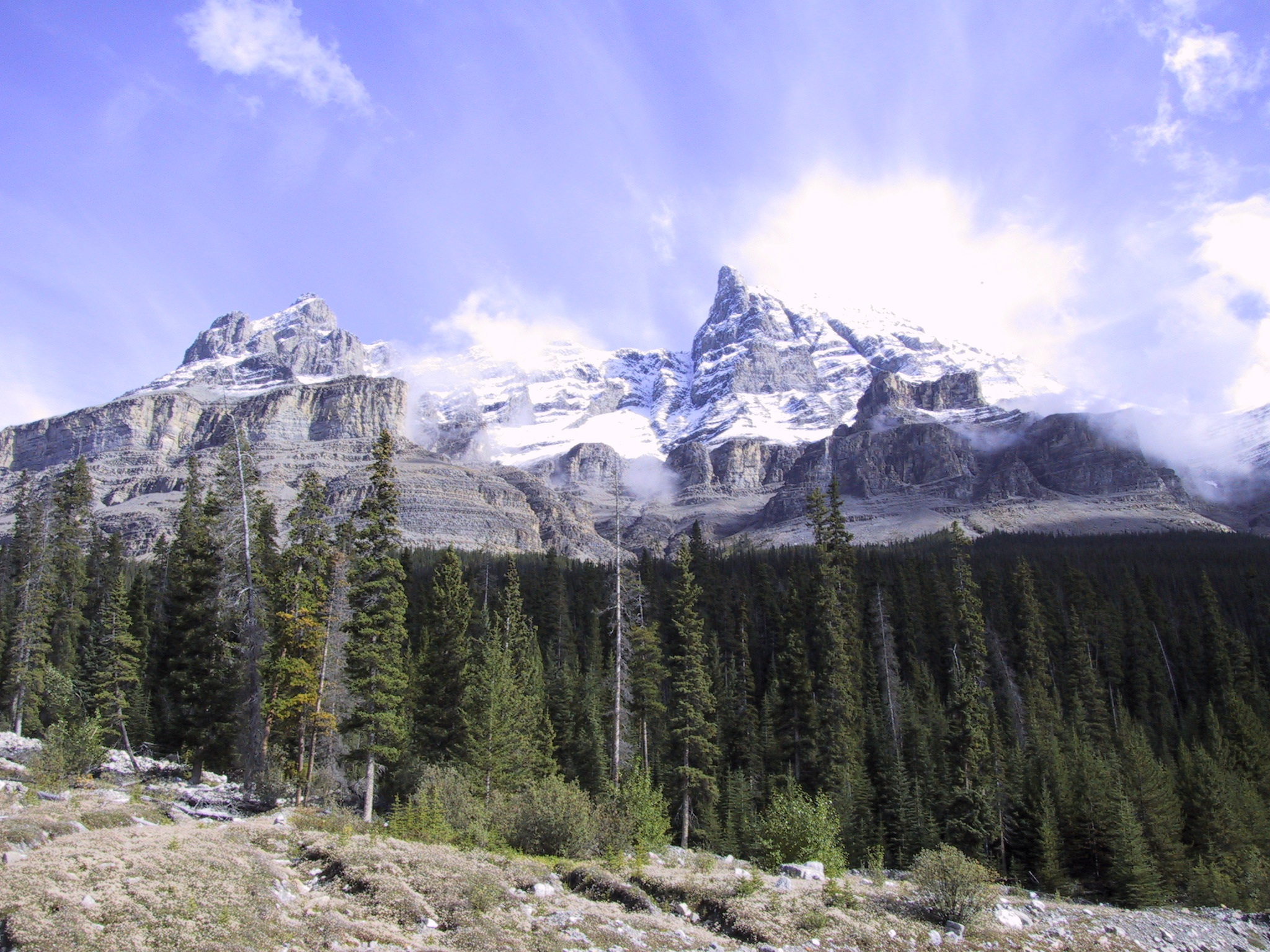
The north aspect of Mount Murchison

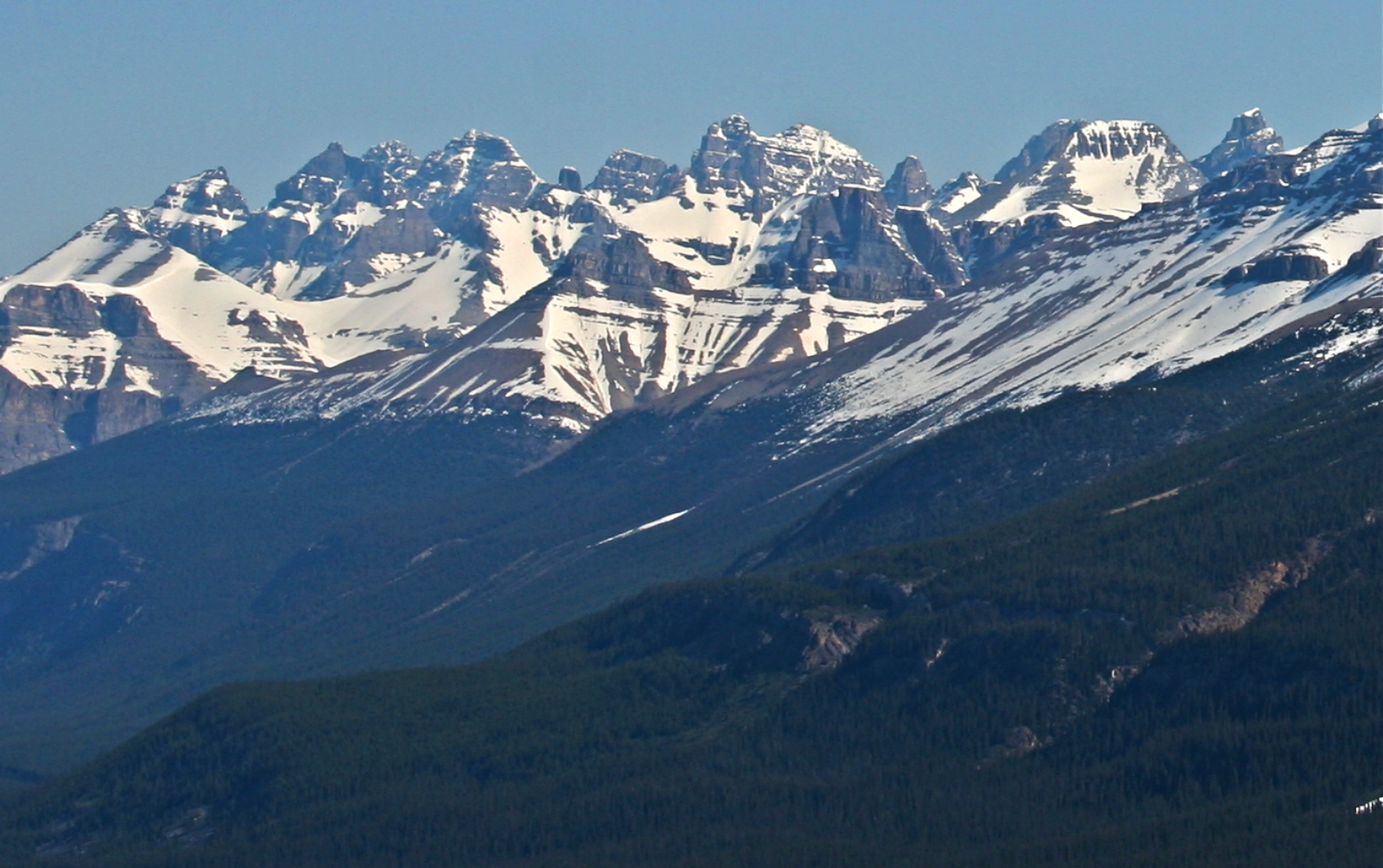
Towers of Mt. Murchison

== See also ==
- List of mountains of Canada
- Geography of Alberta
