= Cirrus Mountain =

Mountain summit in Alberta, Canada

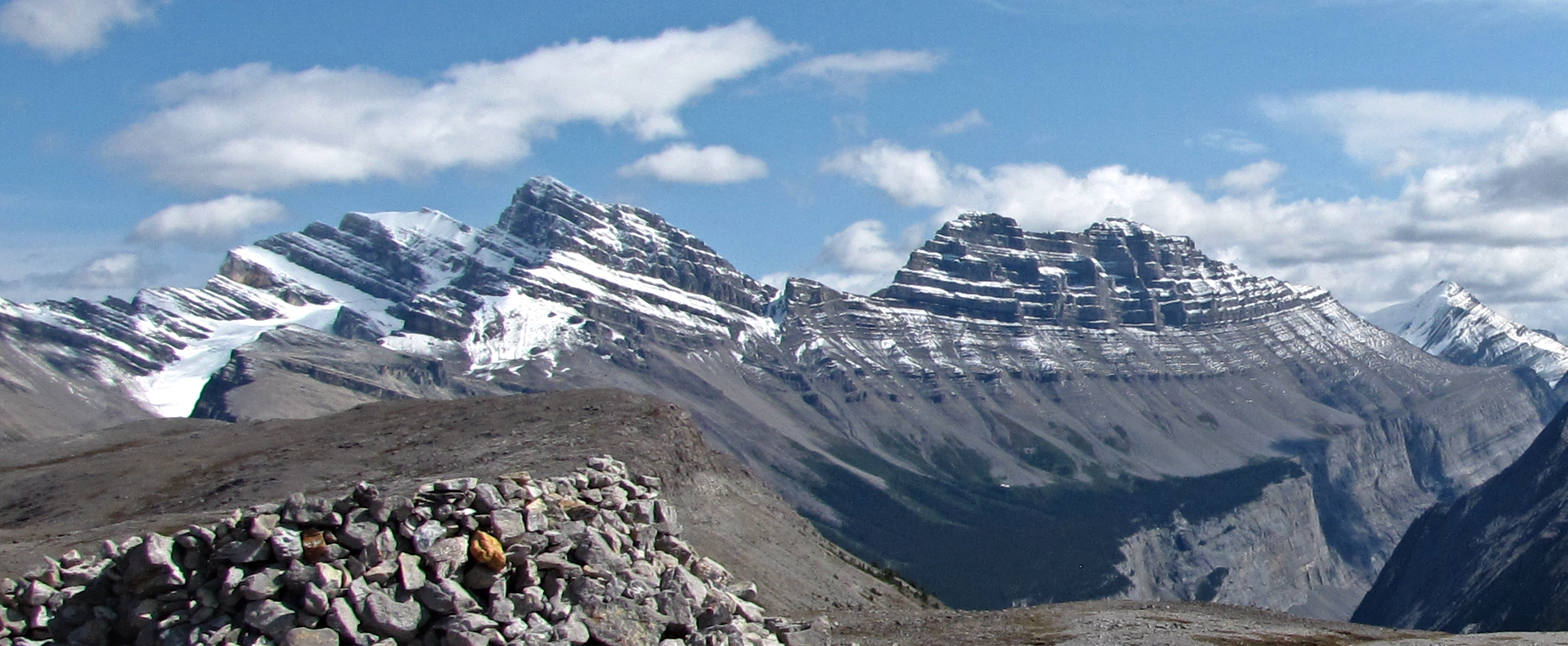
- Cirrus Mountain with summit to left. (Viewed from Parker Ridge)

Highest point
- Elevation: 3,270 m (10,730 ft)
- Prominence: 890 m (2,920 ft)
- Parent peak: Mount Stewart (3,312 m)
- Isolation: 5.92 km (3.68 mi)
- Listing: Mountains of Alberta
- Coordinates: 52°10′10″N 116°58′38″W

Geography
- Location within Alberta Location within Canada
- Country: Canada
- Province: Alberta
- Protected area: Banff National Park; White Goat Wilderness Area
- Parent range: Front Ranges
- Topo map: NTS 83C2 Cline River

Geology
- Rock type: Sedimentary

Climbing
- First ascent: 1939 C.B. Sissons, H.J. Sissons
- Easiest route: technical climb

Cirrus Mountain is a 3,270-metre (10,730-foot) mountain summit located in the upper North Saskatchewan River valley on the shared boundary between Banff National Park and White Goat Wilderness Area, in the Canadian Rockies of Alberta, Canada. Cirrus Mountain is situated along the east side the Icefields Parkway midway between Saskatchewan Crossing and Sunwapta Pass. Topographic relief is significant as the summit rises 1,740 m (5,710 ft) above the parkway in 3 km (1.9 mi). The nearest higher peak is Mount Stewart, 5.92 km (3.68 mi) to the north-northeast.

== History ==
In 1928, Morrison P. Bridgland suggested the name Mount Huntington for the mountain, but it was not adopted. However, the Huntington name endures as the name of the Huntington Glacier below the eastern aspect of the summit. The mountain was instead named Cirrus Mountain, and that toponym was officially adopted in 1935 by the Geographical Names Board of Canada. The first ascent of the mountain was accomplished in 1939 by C.B. Sissons and H.J. Sissons.

== Geology ==
Like other mountains in Banff Park, Cirrus Mountain is composed of sedimentary rock laid down from the Precambrian to Jurassic periods. Formed in shallow seas, this sedimentary rock was pushed east and over the top of younger rock during the Laramide orogeny. The east aspect of Cirrus Mountain is covered by expansive glacial ice known as the Huntington Glacier.

== Climate ==
Based on the Köppen climate classification, Cirrus Mountain is located in a subarctic climate with cold, snowy winters, and mild summers. Winter temperatures can drop below -20 °C with wind chill factors below -30 °C. Weather conditions during winter make the Weeping Wall at the base of Cirrus Mountain's west face the premier place for ice climbing in the Canadian Rockies. Precipitation runoff from Cirrus Mountain drains into tributaries of the North Saskatchewan River.

== Ice Climbing Routes ==
Ice Climbing Routes with grades on Cirrus Mountain:

- Polar Circus - WI5
- Snivelling Gully - WI3
- Weeping Wall - WI3-6
- Weeping Pillar - WI6

== Gallery ==
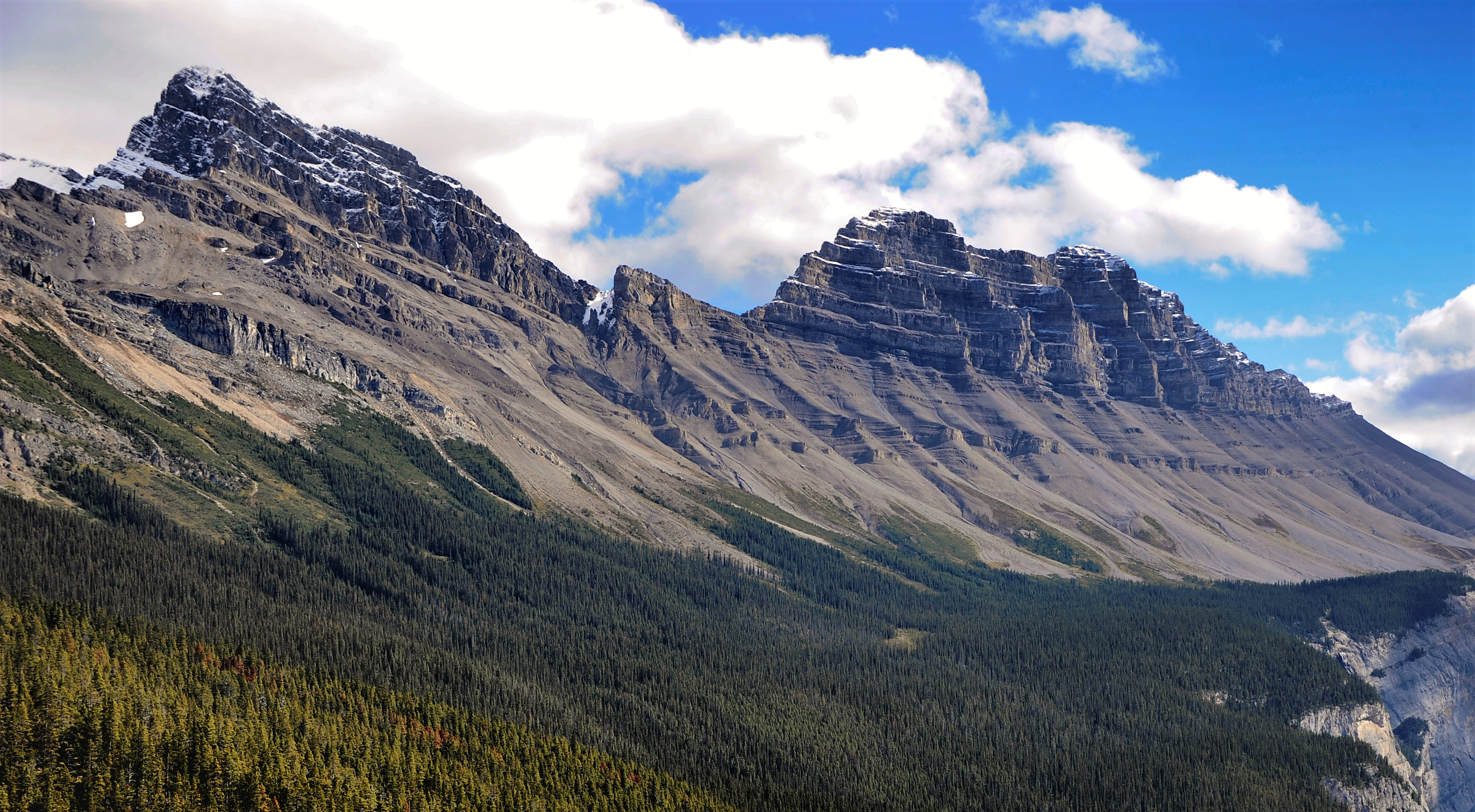
Cirrus Mountain

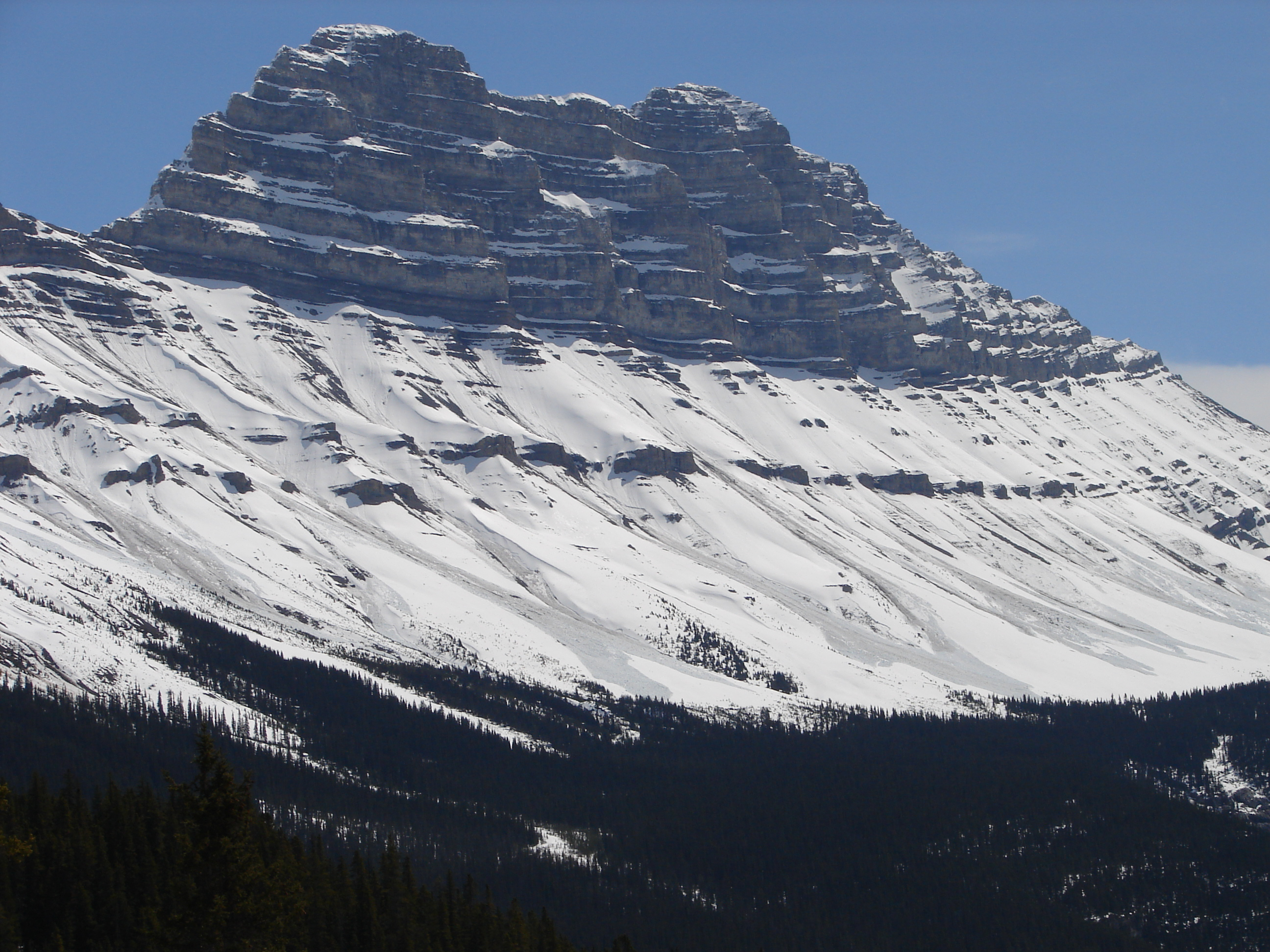
The south peak of Cirrus (3,160+ m)

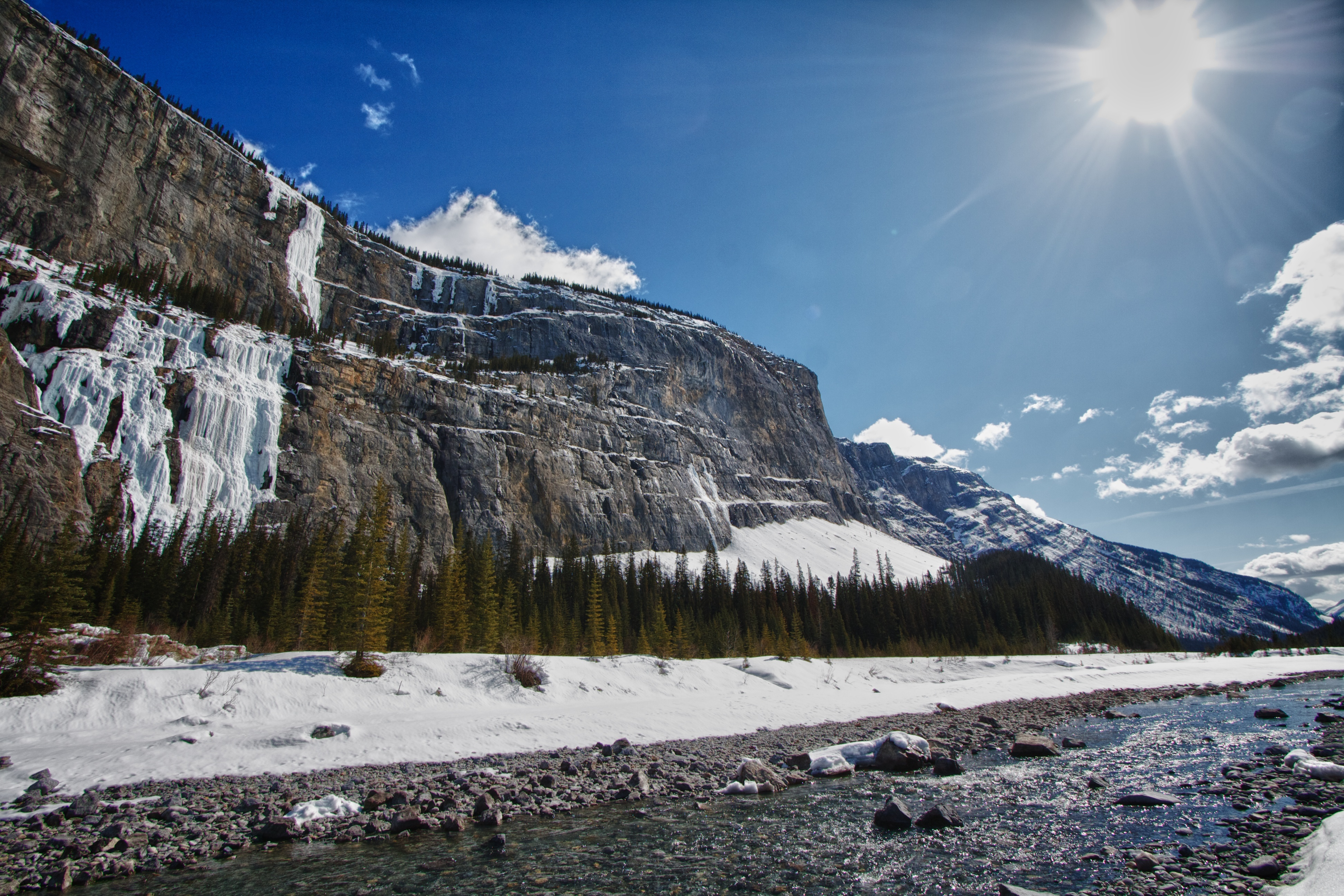
Weeping Wall

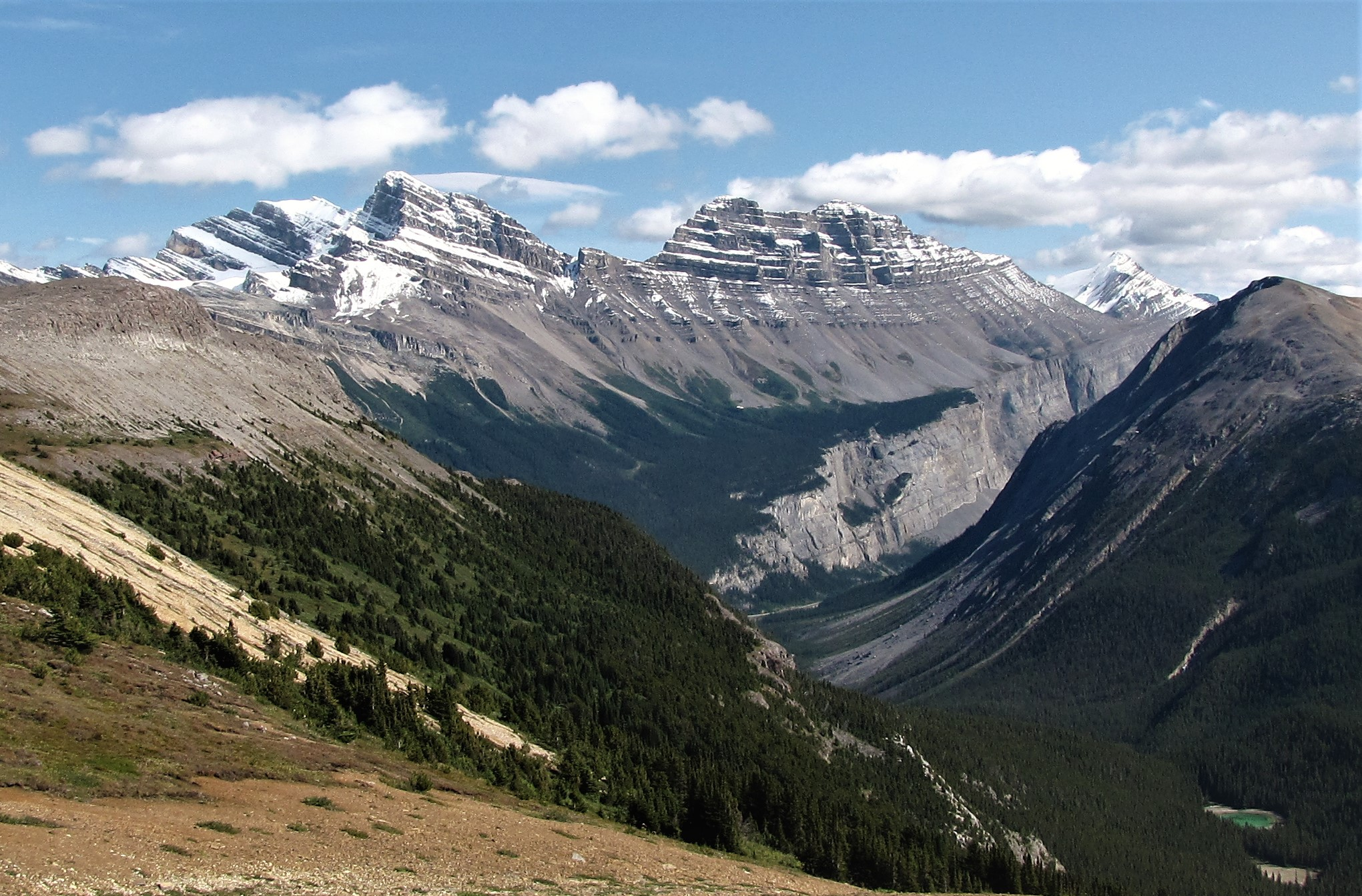
Cirrus Mountain viewed from Parker Ridge

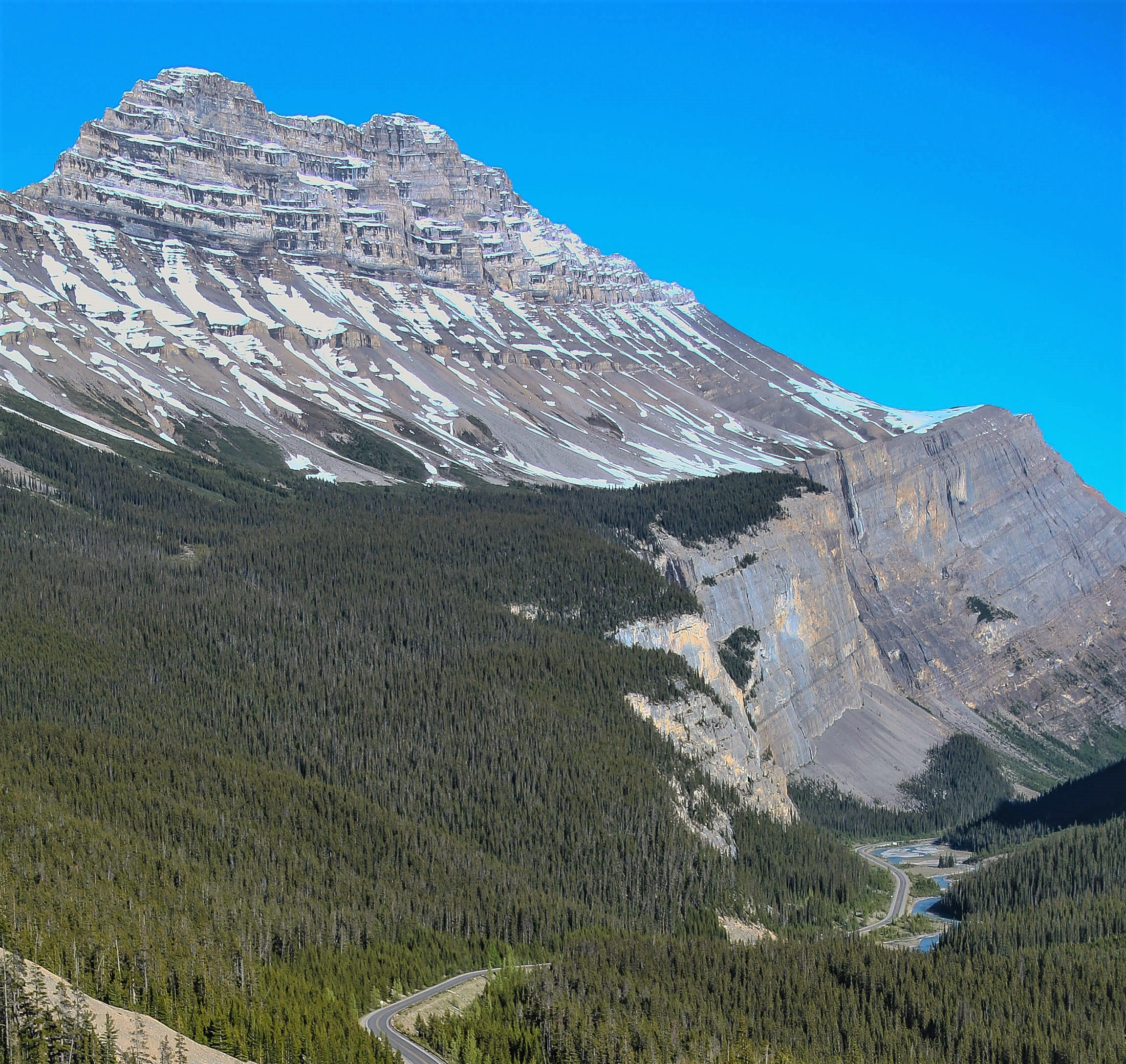
Cirrus Mountain (south peak) and the Weeping Wall

== See also ==
- List of mountains in the Canadian Rockies
- Geography of Alberta
