= Mount Coleman =

Mount Coleman may refer to:

- Mount Coleman (Alberta)
- Mount Coleman (Antarctica)

== See also ==
- Coleman Peak
