= Weeping Wall =

Weeping Wall may refer to:

- Weeping Wall (Alberta), a geologic formation in Banff National Park, Alberta, Canada
- Weeping Wall (Montana), a geologic formation in Glacier National Park, Montana, United States
- "Weeping Wall" (instrumental), a 1977 instrumental song by David Bowie
- The Western Wall in Jerusalem, sometimes also referred to as the "Wailing Wall".
