= Michel Klyne =

- Born: July 2, 1781; Terrebonne, Province of Quebec
- Died: 1868 (aged 86–87)
- Other names: Michael Cline
- Occupation: Postmaster
- Employer(s): North West Company; Hudson's Bay Company
- Spouse: Suzanne Lafrance
- Children: George Klyne; Jane Klyne McDonald; Michel Klyne Jr.
- Parent(s): Johan Adam Klein/Jean Adam Klyne; Marie-Geneviève Bisson

Michel Klyne (2 July 1781 – 1868) was an employee of the North West Company and later the Hudson's Bay Company, serving as postmaster at Jasper House in the Rocky Mountains.

== Early life ==
Klyne was born in the Province of Quebec in 1781, son of a Hessian soldier, Johan Adam Klein (or Jean Adam Klyne) who fought in the American Revolutionary War, and his French Canadian wife, Marie-Geneviève Bisson. He had one sister, also named Marie-Geneviève, and several half-siblings through his father.

== The North West Company and Hudson's Bay Company ==
Klyne entered the employ of the North West Company in the late 1790s as a fur trader. Following the 1821 merger of the NWC and the HBC, he was put in charge of Jasper House, near modern Jasper, Alberta. He served as postmaster for 11 years, from 1824 to 1834. In 1835, he retired to the Red River. Alberta's Cline River and Mount Cline were named in his honor (using a variant spelling of his surname), as well as "Old Klyne's Trail", a trail running along the Cline river valley from the Kootenay Plains to the Athabasca River.

== Personal life ==
In 1807, Klyne married Suzanne Lafrance, daughter of a prominent Métis family. They had ten children, including Jane Klyne McDonald, wife of Archibald McDonald of the Hudson's Bay Company, and George Klyne, MLA (1871–74) for Ste. Agathe, Manitoba.
