= George Klyne =

Canadian politician (1828–1906)

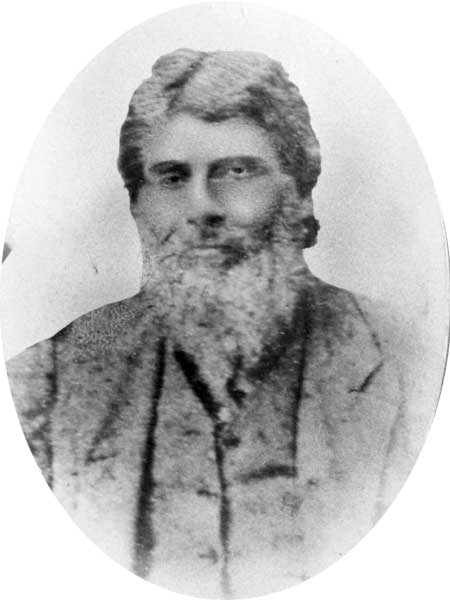
- Manitoba Legislative Assembly portrait of George Klyne

MLA
- In office 1871–1874
- Constituency: Ste. Agathe

Personal details
- Born: 13 August 1828 Riviere Arthabaska, North West Territories
- Died: 23 December 1906 (aged 78)
- Resting place: near Wolseley, Saskatchewan
- Spouse: Monique Berthelet dit Savoyard
- Children: 14 children
- Parents: Michel Klyne (father); Suzanne Lafrance (mother)
- Relatives: Jane Klyne McDonald (sister); Archibald McDonald (brother-in-law); Ranald MacDonald (nephew)
- Occupation: farmer

George Klyne (13 August 1828 – 23 December 1906) was a Member of the Legislative Assembly of Manitoba (1871–74). Métis politician George Kline was first a member the Convention of Forty in 1870 representing Pointe a Grouette and then became one of the first elected MLA's in Manitoba representing the riding of Ste. Agathe. George was also a member of the Southesk Expedition in 1859.

== Early life ==
Klyne was born at Athabasca River in 1828, son of French Canadian Michel Klyne, the HBC postmaster at Jasper House, and his Métis wife, Suzanne (née Lafrance). He had 13 siblings, including Jane Klyne, wife of Archibald McDonald of the Hudson's Bay Company. Klyne was educated at Saint Boniface, Manitoba.

== Red River Rebellion ==
Though a Francophone Métis, Klyne was an opponent of Louis Riel in the Red River Rebellion, and in late 1869, he was imprisoned by Riel's men for thirty days. After his release in early 1870, he was chosen as a Francophone representative for Pointe-à-Grouette on the convention of forty (split evenly between Francophones and Anglophones).

== General election, 1870 ==
Klyne stood for election in 1870 for the riding of Ste. Agathe, beating his opponent, Alexander Morin, by only five votes. Klyne served one term, 1871–74. He sought election again in 1878 but was disqualified.

== Personal life ==
On 13 January 1863, Klyne married Monique Barthelais dit Savoyard. They went on to have 14 children.
