= Mount Stewart (Alberta) =

Mountain in Alberta, Canada

- Location within Alberta

Highest point
- Elevation: 3,312 m (10,866 ft)
- Prominence: 1,117 m (3,665 ft) above Nigel Pass
- Parent peak: Sunwapta Peak 3315 m
- Listing: Mountains of Alberta
- Coordinates: 52°13′09″N 116°56′40″W

Geography
- Country: Canada
- Province: Alberta
- Parent range: Cloister Mountains
- Topo map: NTS 83C2 Cline River

Mount Stewart is a mountain on the northern side of Upper Cataract Creek Valley in Alberta, Canada. It is the highest point of the Cloister Mountains.

The mountain was named by Arthur Coleman in 1902 for Louis Stewart, a professor of Surveys at the University of Toronto. In the late 1800s, Stewart had accompanied Coleman on two trips into the Canadian Rockies. Stewart's father, George Alexander Stewart became the first superintendent of Banff National Park.
