= Mount Cline =

Mountain in Alberta, Canada

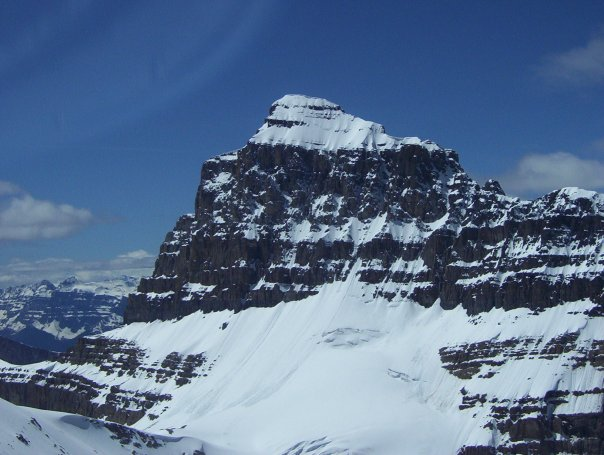
- Mount Cline in June 2008

Highest point
- Elevation: 3,361 m (11,027 ft)
- Prominence: 1,196 m (3,924 ft)
- Listing: Mountains of Alberta
- Coordinates: 52°04′12″N 116°40′56″W

Geography
- Location within Alberta Location within Canada
- Country: Canada
- Province: Alberta
- Parent range: Cline Range; Canadian Rockies
- Topo map: NTS 83C2 Cline River

Climbing
- First ascent: 1927 by J. H. Barnes, A. L. Castle, A. L. Castle Jr., Jimmy Simpson, guided by Rudolph Aemmer

Mount Cline is a mountain in western Alberta, Canada, 11 km (6.8 mi) north of Saskatchewan Crossing, 60 km (37 mi) southwest of Nordegg.

The mountain is located in the North Saskatchewan River Valley, 2 km (1 mi) west of Resolute Mountain. It was named in 1898 by J. Norman Collie, after Michel Klyne (also called Michael Cline), French Canadian postmaster of Jasper House from 1824 to 1835.

== Geology ==
Mount Cline is composed of sedimentary rock laid down during the Precambrian to Jurassic periods. Formed in shallow seas, this sedimentary rock was pushed east and over the top of younger rock during the Laramide orogeny.

== Climate ==
Based on the Köppen climate classification, Mount Cline is located in a subarctic climate with cold, snowy winters, and mild summers. Temperatures can drop below -20 °C with wind chill factors below -30 °C.

== Gallery ==
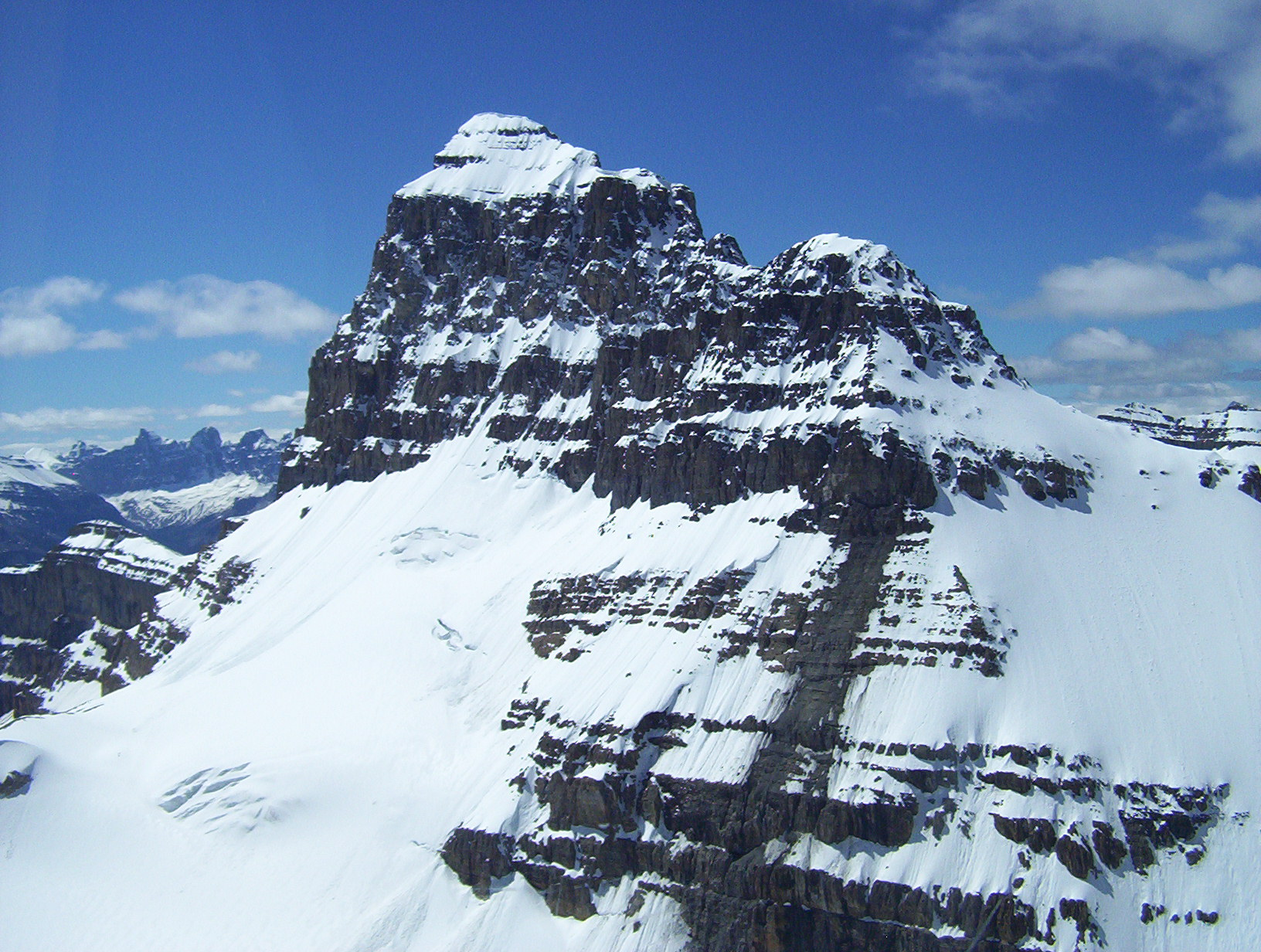
Mount Cline

== See also ==
- List of mountains in the Canadian Rockies
