= Cloister Mountains =

Mountain range in Alberta, Canada

- Location within Alberta

Highest point
- Peak: Mount Stewart
- Elevation: 3,312 m (10,866 ft)
- Listing: Mountain ranges of Canada
- Coordinates: 52°13′09″N 116°56′40″W

Dimensions
- Length: 24 km (15 mi) N-S
- Width: 27 km (17 mi) E-W
- Area: 349 km^{2} (135 mi^{2})

Geography
- Country: Canada
- Province: Alberta
- Range coordinates: 52°13′01″N 116°49′32″W
- Parent range: Canadian Rockies

Cloister Mountains is a mountain range in Alberta, Canada.

Cloister Mountains were so named on account of the shape of their outline.
