= Weeping Wall (Alberta) =

Ice climbing mountain cliffs in Alberta, Canada

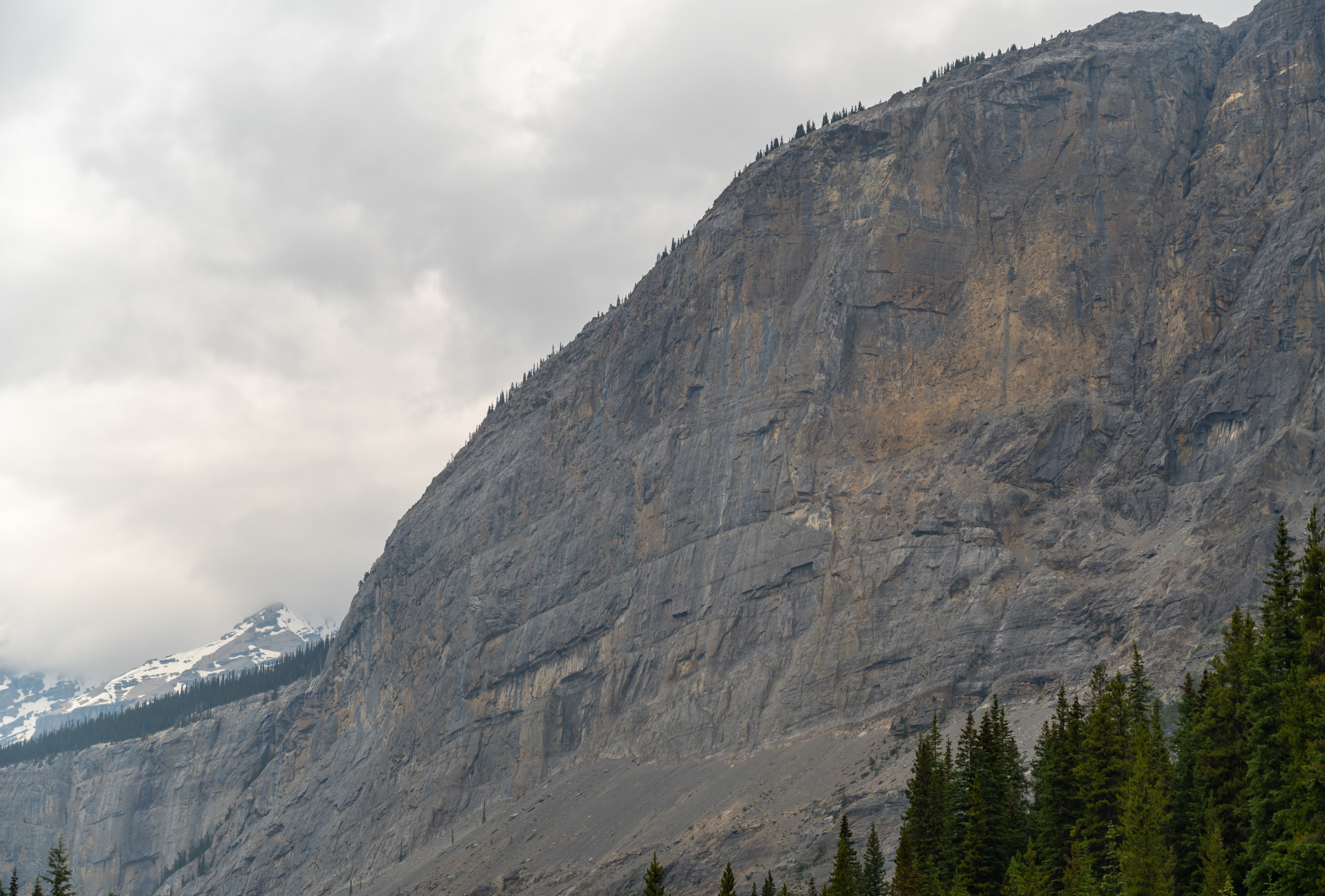
- The Weeping Wall is located along the Icefields Parkway.

Highest point
- Elevation: 1,785 m (5,856 ft)
- Prominence: 300 m (980 ft)
- Coordinates: 52°9′23″N 117°0′24″W

Geography
- Location within Alberta
- Location: Alberta, Canada

The Weeping Wall is a set of cliffs, approximately 1000 feet high, located at the western base of Cirrus Mountain alongside Highway 93 (Icefields Parkway) in northern Banff National Park in Alberta, Canada, just south of the boundary with Jasper National Park.

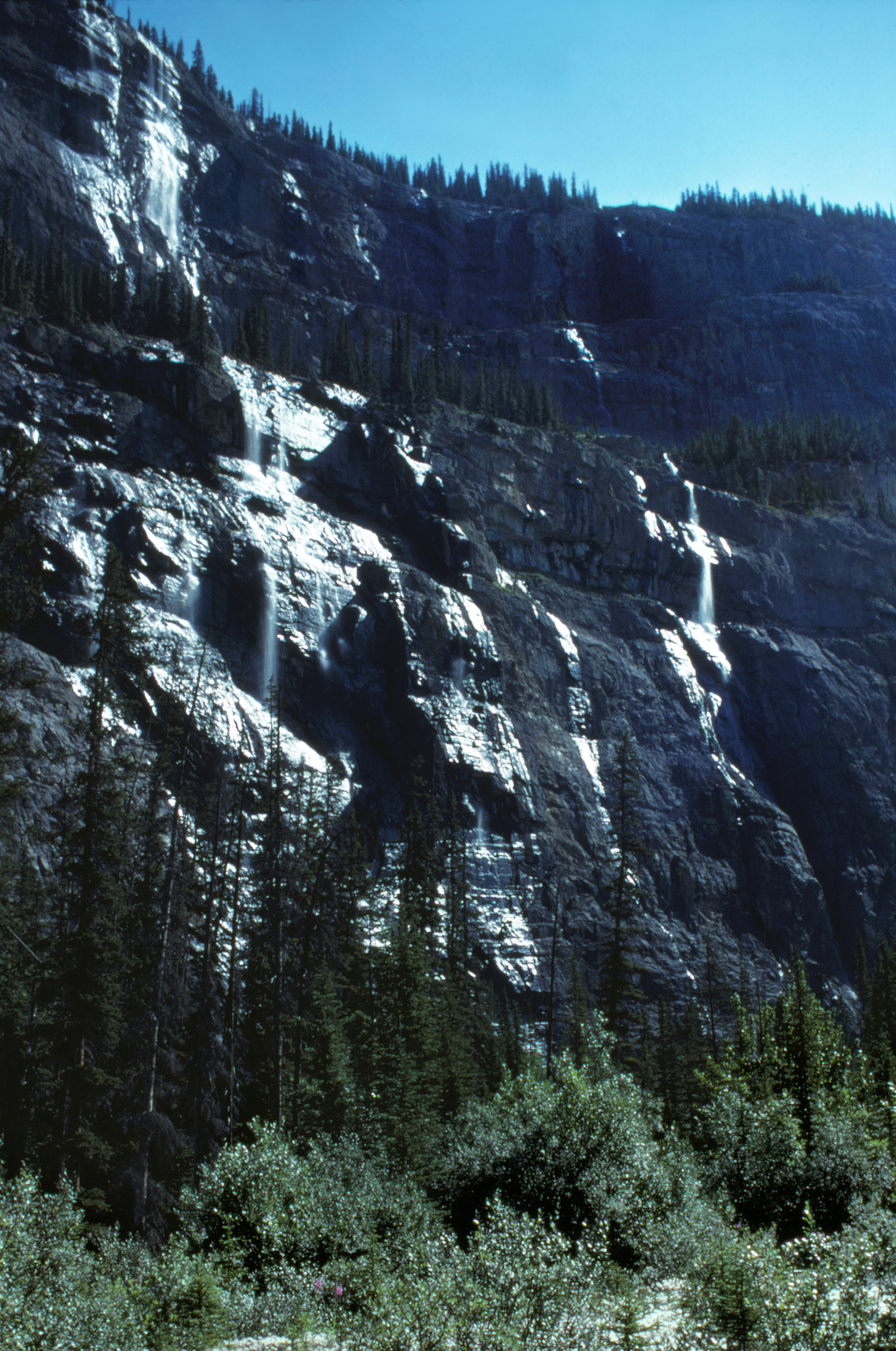
Waterfalls on Weeping Wall in Summer

In spring and summer, the faces of the cliffs are usually covered with a series of cascading waterfalls. In winter, the waterfalls freeze into towering pillars of ice and become a well-known site for ice climbing.
