= Cline River =

River in Alberta, Canada

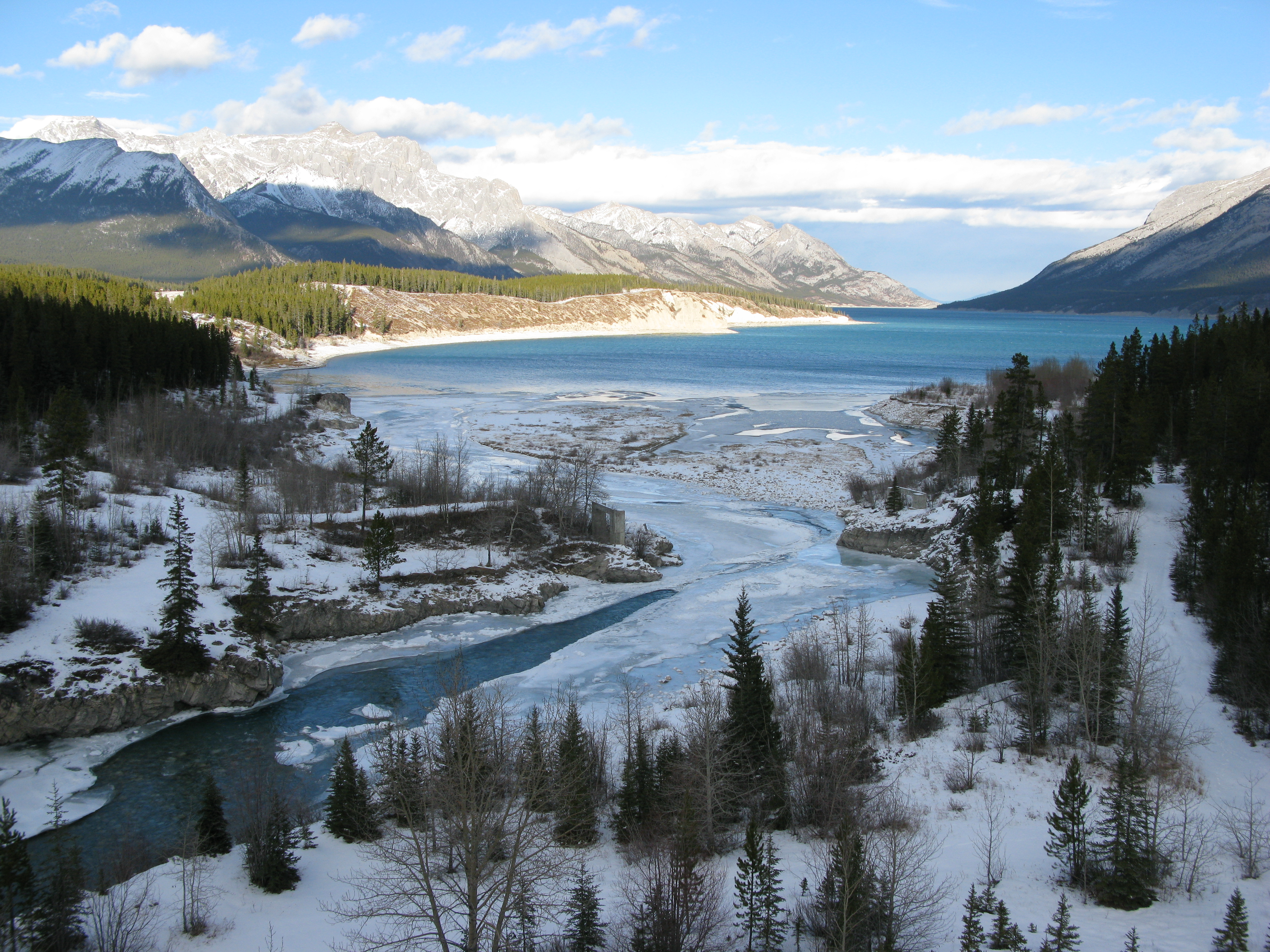
- The Cline River near Abraham Lake

Location
- Country: Canada
- Province: Alberta

Physical characteristics
- Source
  - location: Pinto Lake
  - coordinates: 52°07′48″N 116°51′21″W
  - elevation: 1,750 m (5,740 ft)
- Mouth
  - location: Lake Abraham
  - coordinates: 52°10′23″N 116°28′43″W
  - elevation: 1,321 m (4,334 ft)

The Cline River is a short river in western Alberta, Canada. It flows from Pinto Lake and joins the North Saskatchewan River at Lake Abraham in west-central Alberta.

== Geography ==
Pinto Lake is located north of Sunset Pass. The lake is fed from the glacial meltwater of Minister Mountain, Mount Coleman, and Cirrus Mountain. The river then flows directly east, emptying into Lake Abraham.

The river, as well as Mount Cline and Cline Pass, are named for Michel Klyne, also referred to as Michael Cline. Klyne was employed as a fur trader by the Hudson's Bay Company and the North West Company.

== Tributaries ==
- Pinto Lake
- Huntington Creek
- Cataract Creek
- McDonald Creek
- Waterfalls Creek
  - Michele Lakes
- Entry Creek
  - Lake of the Falls, Landslide Lake, Shoe Leather Creek
- Sentinel Creek
- Coral Creek
- O.D. Creek

=== Previously known ===
- Whitegoat River
- Mirliton River

== See also ==
- List of Alberta rivers
