= Saskatchewan River Crossing, Alberta =

Locality in Alberta, Canada

Coordinates: 51°58′28″N 116°44′44″W

Location of Saskatchewan River Crossing Alberta

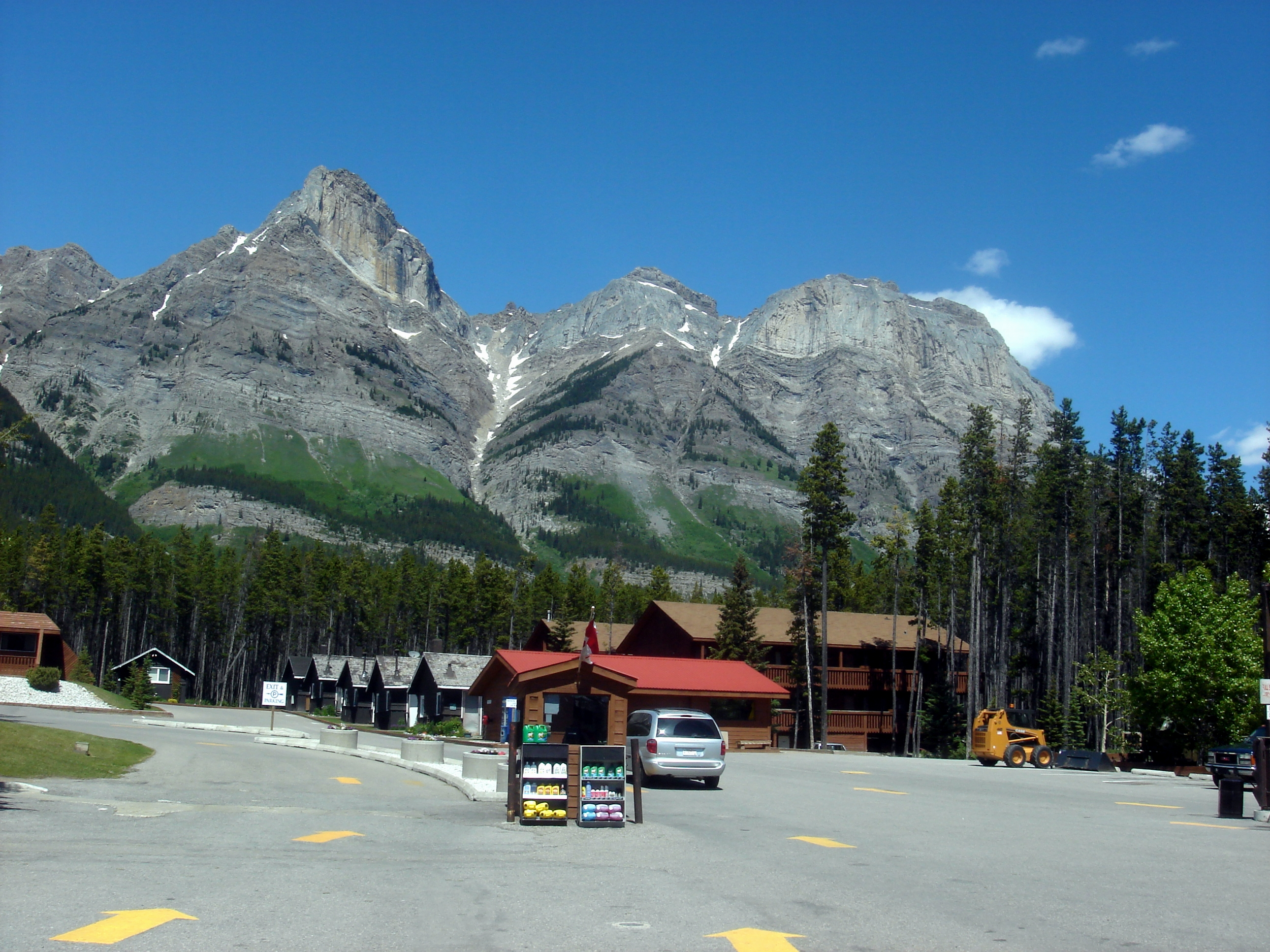
Resort in Saskatchewan River Crossing and Mount Wilson

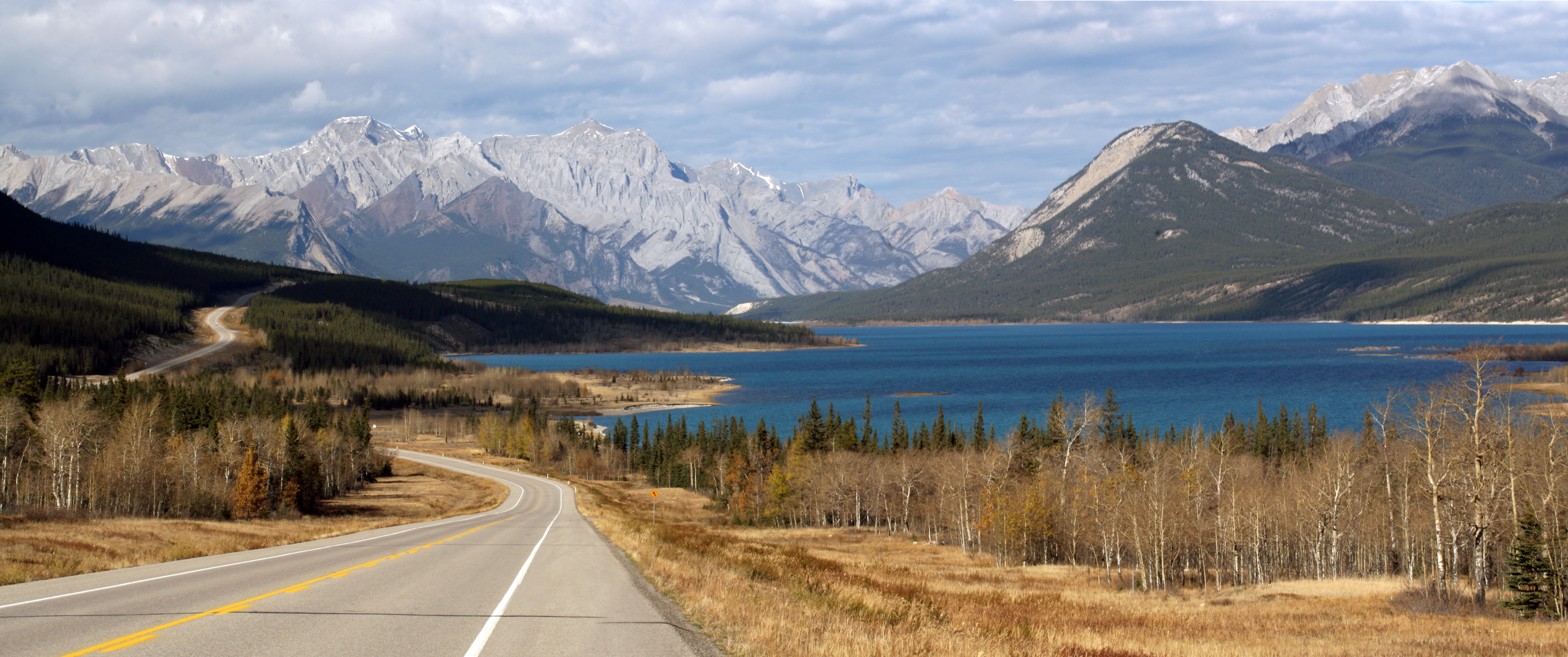
East of Saskatchewan River Crossing on Highway 11 with Abraham Lake

Saskatchewan River Crossing is a locality in western Alberta, Canada. It is located within Banff National Park at the junction of Highway 93 (Icefields Parkway) and Highway 11 (David Thompson Highway). It is administered by Improvement District No. 9.

It was named "The Crossing", when travellers and fur traders used this spot to cross the North Saskatchewan River on their way to British Columbia in the 19th century.

== Geography ==
It lies as the confluence of the North Saskatchewan River with Howse River and Mistaya River in the Canadian Rockies and is the starting point for tours on the Columbia Icefield and other scenic hiking trails. Mount Wilson, immediately to the north, towers above Saskatchewan Crossing whereas Mount Murchison is prominent to the southeast, and Mount Erasmus to the west.

== Services ==
It is the only place offering basic services between Lake Louise and Jasper, including gasoline, restaurant, and lodging. However, these services are seasonal, and closed during the winter. Gasoline prices have been observed as being 50% more expensive than elsewhere.

== See also ==
- Alberta's Rockies
- Alberta Highway 93
