= Mount Hood (disambiguation) =

Mount Hood is the tallest mountain in the U.S. state of Oregon.

Mount Hood may also refer to:

- Mount Hood (Alberta), a mountain in Alberta, Canada
- Mount Hood, Oregon, a community in Oregon
- Mount Hood (California), a mountain in northern California
- Mount Hood (painting), an 1869 painting by Albert Bierstadt
- USS Mount Hood, multiple ships including:
  - USS Mount Hood (AE-11), an ammunition ship in service during World War II in the Pacific Ocean
  - USS Mount Hood (AE-29), an ammunition ship in service from 1971 to 1999
