= Cart with Red and White Ox =

Painting by Vincent van Gogh

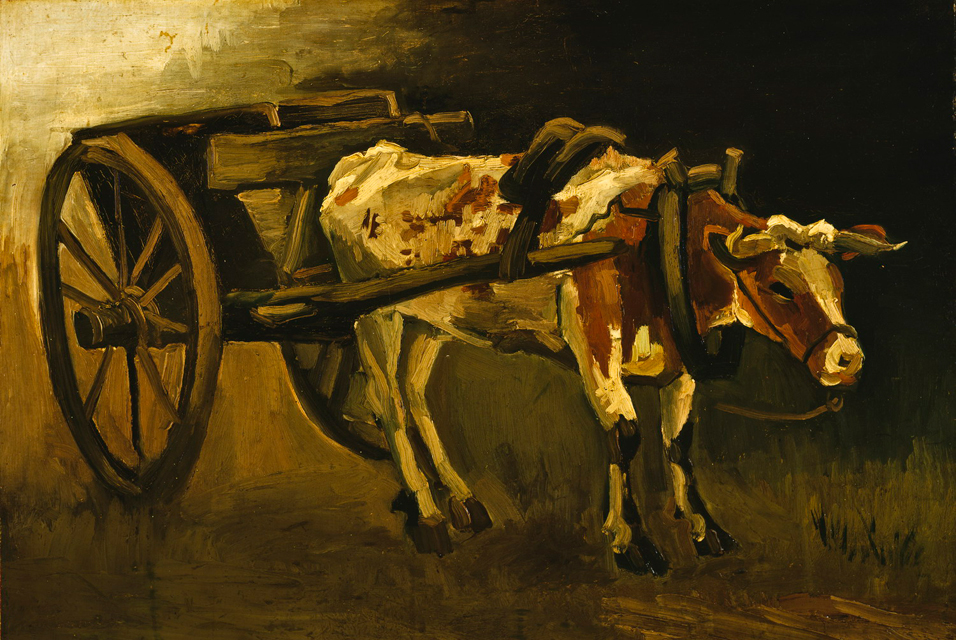
- Artist: Vincent van Gogh
- Year: 1884
- Catalogue: F38; JH504
- Medium: Oil on canvas on panel
- Dimensions: 57.0 cm × 82.5 cm (22.4 in × 32.5 in)
- Location: Kröller-Müller Museum; Otterlo

Cart with Red and White Ox is an oil painting created in 1884 by Vincent van Gogh. It is in the Kröller-Müller Museum in Otterlo, Netherlands and may have been made either before or after Cart with Black Ox. Van Gogh painted both some four years before leaving the Netherlands for the South of France. A similar painting made the same year, called Cart with a Black Ox, is in the Portland Art Museum in Portland.

== See also ==
- List of works by Vincent van Gogh
