= Cart with Black Ox =

Painting by Vincent van Gogh

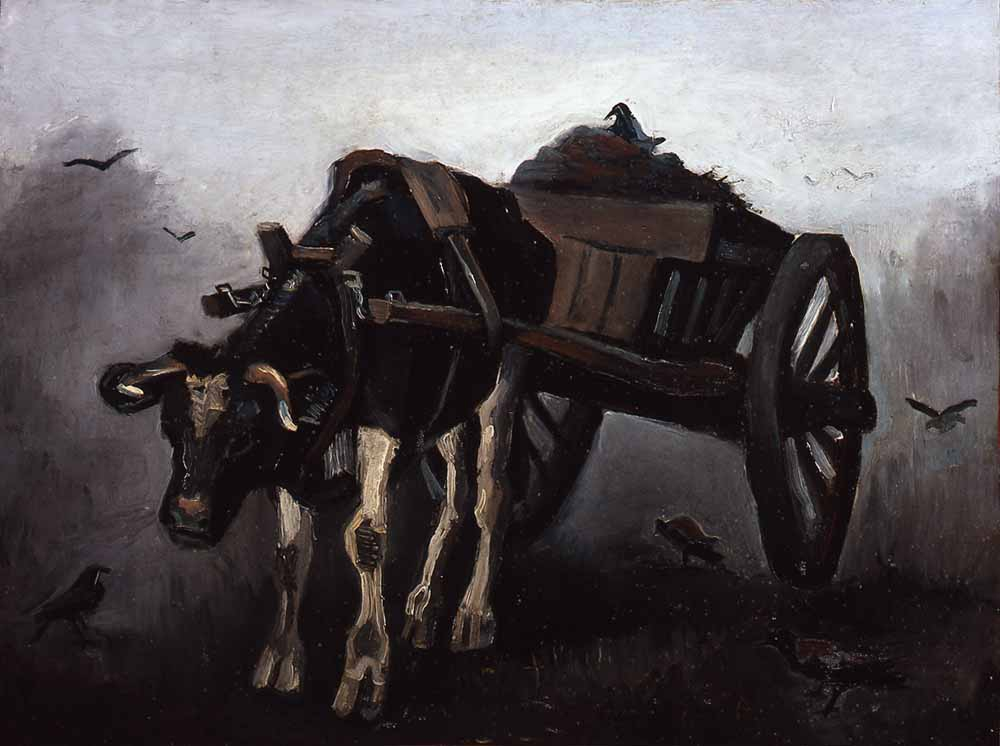
- Artist: Vincent van Gogh
- Year: 1884
- Catalogue: F39; JH505
- Medium: Oil on canvas
- Dimensions: 60.0 cm × 80.0 cm (23.6 in × 31.5 in)
- Location: Portland Art Museum; Portland

Cart with Black Ox, or The Ox-Cart, is an oil painting created in 1884 by Vincent van Gogh. It has been cited as one of his important early works.

== Description ==
Created in the village of Nuenen before Van Gogh went to the South of France, the painting has a dark palette and has been described as "disquieting"; the ox and cart are both decrepit.

Cart with Black Ox was owned by a family who had bought it in 1950. It was donated in 2007 to the Portland Art Museum, and as of 2010 is the most valuable gift yet made to the museum.

Curator Bruce Guenther argued, "The way the wheel becomes a definition lifted off the surface of the painting with the brush is Van Gogh establishing his vocabulary as a painter. He becomes Van Gogh here."

In 2010, the painting was analyzed by digital X-ray and CT scanning to look for information on the artist's working methods and to add to the database at the Van Gogh Museum in Amsterdam. A painted-out flying bird was discovered. A related painting made the same year, Cart with Red and White Ox, is in the Kröller-Müller Museum in Otterlo, the Netherlands.

== See also ==
- List of works by Vincent van Gogh
- Cart with Red and White Ox
