= Paolo Lazzarino =

Italian painter

Paolo Lazzarino, also called Paoluccio di Lazzarino (14th–century) was an Italian painter active in Tuscany.

He was born to a painter Lazzarino di Luporo, who had been exiled from Lucca due to his Guelph leanings after the ascension of Uguccione della Faggiuola. The father of Paolo traveled to Siena and later Florence, where his son learned painting. Paolo painted for San Giovanni Fuorcivitas in Pistoia. In 1340, Paolo was inscribed as one of the foreigners practicing art in Florence. The last document note in 1351 he had returned to Lucca. Cecco di Pietro and Francesco Cristofori may have been one of his pupils.
