= Cecco di Pietro =

Italian painter

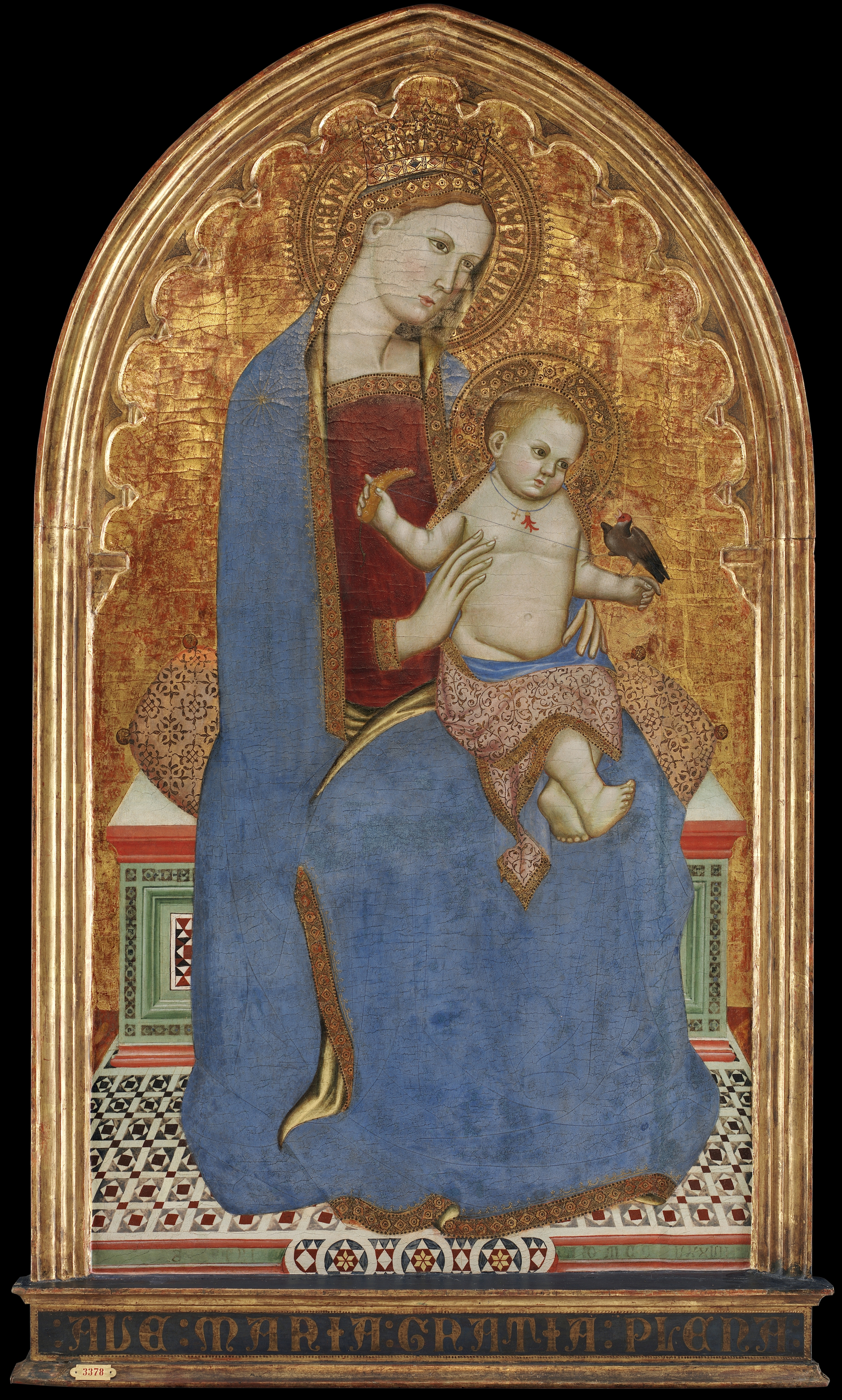
Cecco di Pietro, Madonna and Child, Copenhagen, Statens Museum for Kunst

Cecco di Pietro was an Italian painter of the Pisan School. While his date of birth cannot be confirmed, there is some mention of a Cecco Pierri working with the painter Paolo di Lazzarino in 1350. If this was a reference to di Pietro, then his date of birth can be placed around 1330.

He was active starting from around 1370 and died sometime before 1402. Cecco is seen as an important figure in Trecento art because of his development of a style that incorporated elements of Pisan painting along with those of the Sienese School.

== Life and work ==
Early documents indicate that some of Cecco di Pietro's first work as an artist was restoring frescoes. He is first mentioned in notices from around 1370 as having worked at the Campo Santo with five other painters working on restoring frescoes in the area. He is next mentioned in notices from 1372 concerning the restoration of the Story of Job fresco in the Campo Santo with Francesco Volterra. Records regarding his pay from the time show that it was a small sum of money when compared with other artists of the day, indicating that he was still inexperienced and learning the craft of the Pisan school from Volterra.

Following the restoration of the Story of Job, there is another notice of Cecco di Pietro being hired in 1379 to restore the Inferno from a trio of frescoes by Buonamico Buffalmacco which were also located in the Campo Santo and were apparently damaged by some untrained apprentices in a previous restoration attempt. Of the restoration of the Inferno, most scholars only attribute the 2nd circle of Hell and two figures to the side of the Devil as the portions restored by Cecco, with the other restoration work carried out by a separate, unknown artist.

One of his masterpieces is the Madonna and Child, signed and dated 1378, now at the Statens Museum for Kunst in Copenhagen in Denmark, which was the central compartment of Saint Rainerius polyptych made for the church of San Francesco in Pisa.

Cecco continued to receive a number of local commissions, painting many altarpieces. One such altarpiece is the Polyptych of Agnano, executed between 1386–1395 for the church and convent at Agnano, and is considered one of Cecco's most important pieces. He continued to work in the fresco style until his death around 1402

== Style ==
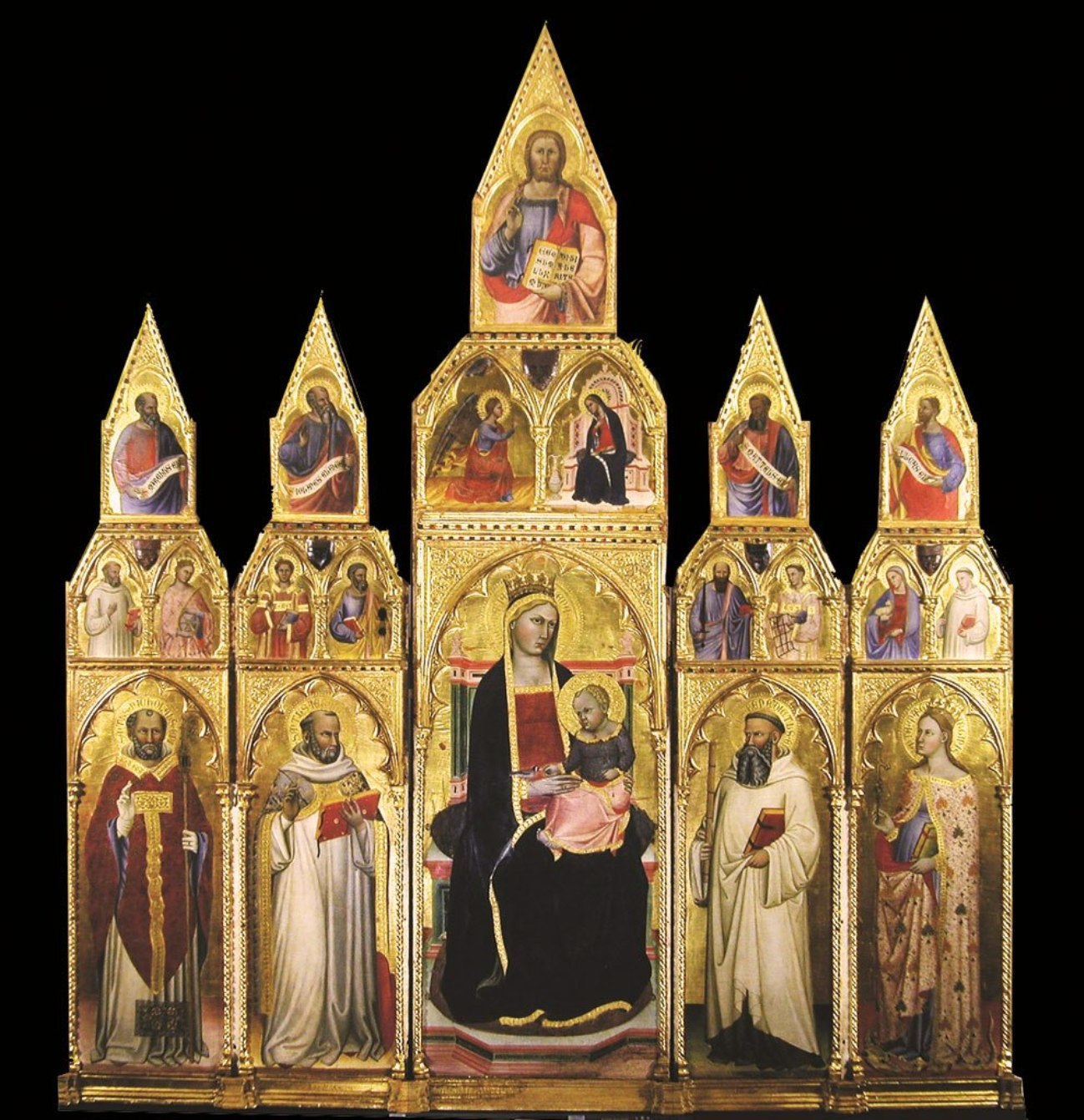
Polittico di Agnano, Palazzo Blu, Pisa

During his career, Cecco worked on themes common to other artists of the Trecento period. Much of the artwork produced by Cecco was of the Virgin and Child, such as The Virgin and Child With Donors in 1386, which was part of a polyptych that has since been separated, and its various pieces are located in different museums around the world. In documents from 1380, we see that Cecco was referred to as anziano or “elder” in Italian. This classifies him as a representative of the “San Simoncino di Porta” parish that he belonged to in Pisa.

Initial evaluations by early art historians looked on Cecco di Pietro's work as not being historically or technically significant. Additionally, some early art historians did not critically consider the Pisan School as a whole. Later, Cecco's work has been reevaluated, and is now seen as one of the Pisan masters with his own unique style. His style evolved over his career, starting first as an example of the Pisan School of painting and eventually developing into a hybrid of Sienese and Pisan styles. Cecco's greatest influence from the Pisan school was in his use of punches, a decoration trend where the artist would punch shapes and patterns out of metal to be incorporated in the painting that was very popular in Tuscany during the Trecento.

His earlier work such as The Madonna and Child with Donors is more naturalistic when compared with his later works, where his figures take on a more elongated and ethereal appearance similar to the Sienese style at the time. This is seen most prominently in the depiction of the head of the child. Another work that clearly displays this shift towards more ethereal figures is the recently restored Virgin and Child Playing with a Gold Finch.. In this painting, the Madonna's face and neck have taken on a longer, more drawn appearance, and the fingers of the Madonna are long and slender.

It is unknown what exactly brought about this shift in Cecco's style but there is some work that suggests that Sienese painter Luca di Tommè may have been an influence. Whether through direct mentorship or Cecco's admiration of his work, there are many similarities between the works of Tommè and the later works of Cecco. These similarities can be seen between Cecco's Polpytch of the Crucifixion from 1386 and a similar scene by di Tomme from 1366. Cecco created many works in this hybrid style, which presents an example of the shifting styles of painters at the start of the Italian Renaissance.

== List of works ==
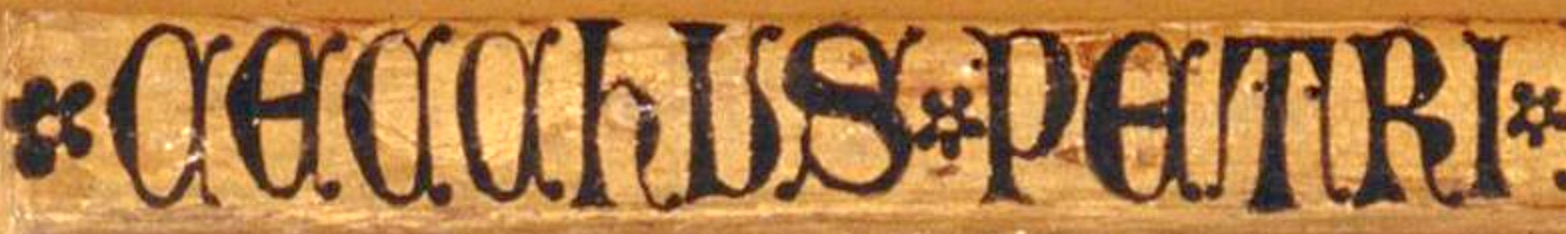
Signature of Cecco di Pietro detail from the Madonna with Child , Portland Art Museum, Portland

- Crucifixion between the Virgin and Saints, National Museum of San Matteo, Pisa
- Virgin and Child (1370), private collection Rimedio, Pisa
- Virgin and Child (1380), private collection Tezi, Pisa
- Virgin and Child with Donors (1386), Portland Art Museum
- Polyptych of Agnano (1386–1395), Palazzo Blu, Pisa
- Virgin and Child with Finch (v.1371), Statens Museum for Kunst, Copenaghue
- Saint Jerome in His Studio (v.1370), North Carolina Museum of Art, Raleigh
- The Baptism of Christ (compartment predella)
- St. Benedict, Musée du Petit Palais, Avignon
- Saint Barthelemy (1386), Musée du Petit Palais, Avignon
- Saint Nicolas (1386), Musée du Petit Palais, Avignon
- St. Peter (1386), Musée du Petit Palais, Avignon
- St. John the Baptist (1386), Musée du Petit Palais, Avignon

Frescoes

- Camposanto Monumentale di Pisa
- San Martino in Kinzica, Pisa

== Gallery of selected works ==
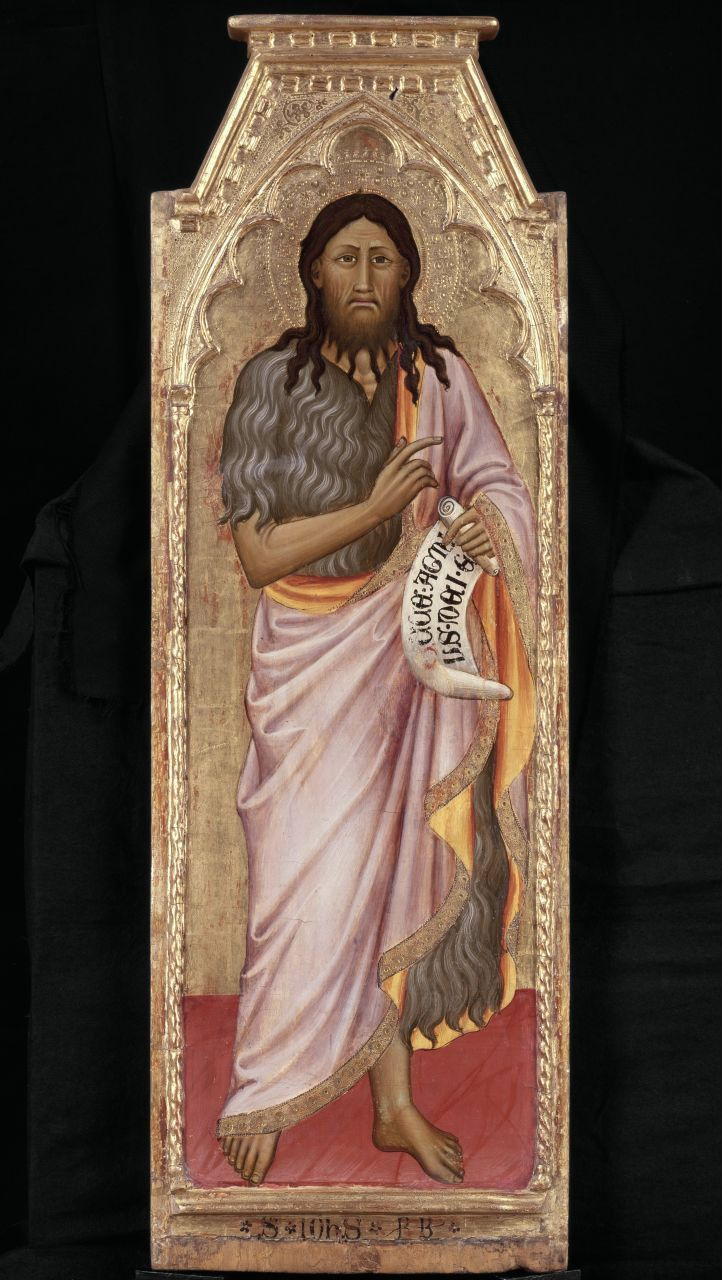
San Giovanni Battista, Musée du Petit Palais, Avignon

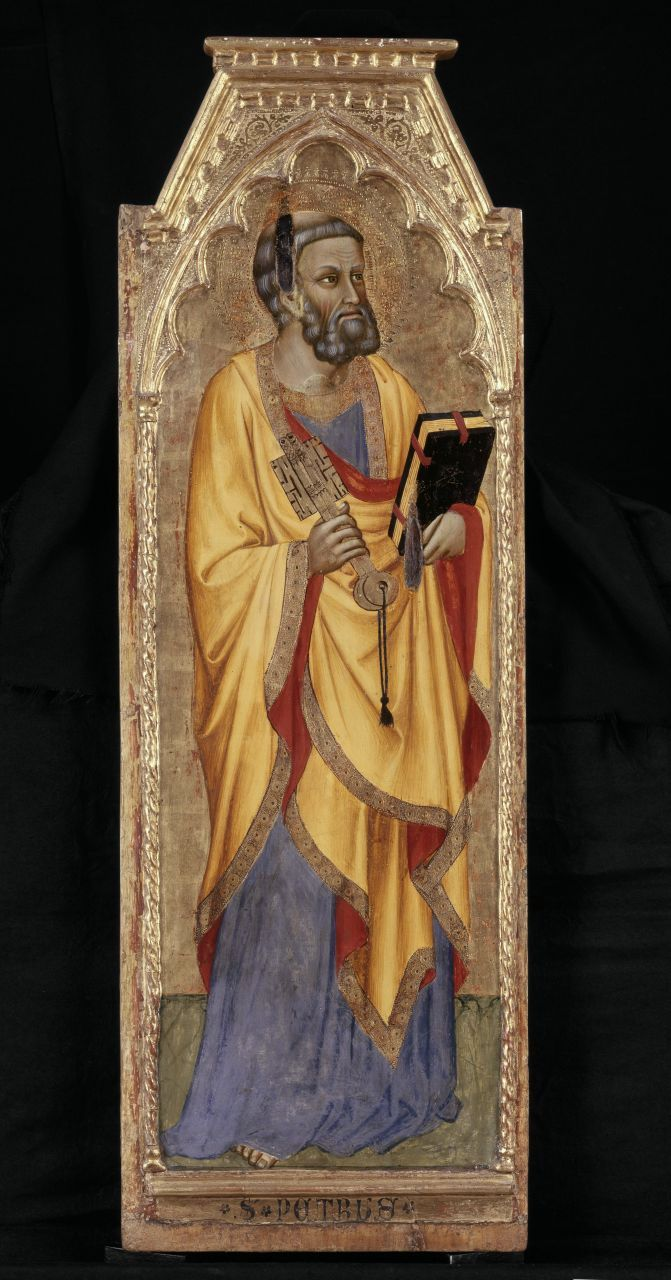
San Pietro, Musée du Petit Palais, Avignon

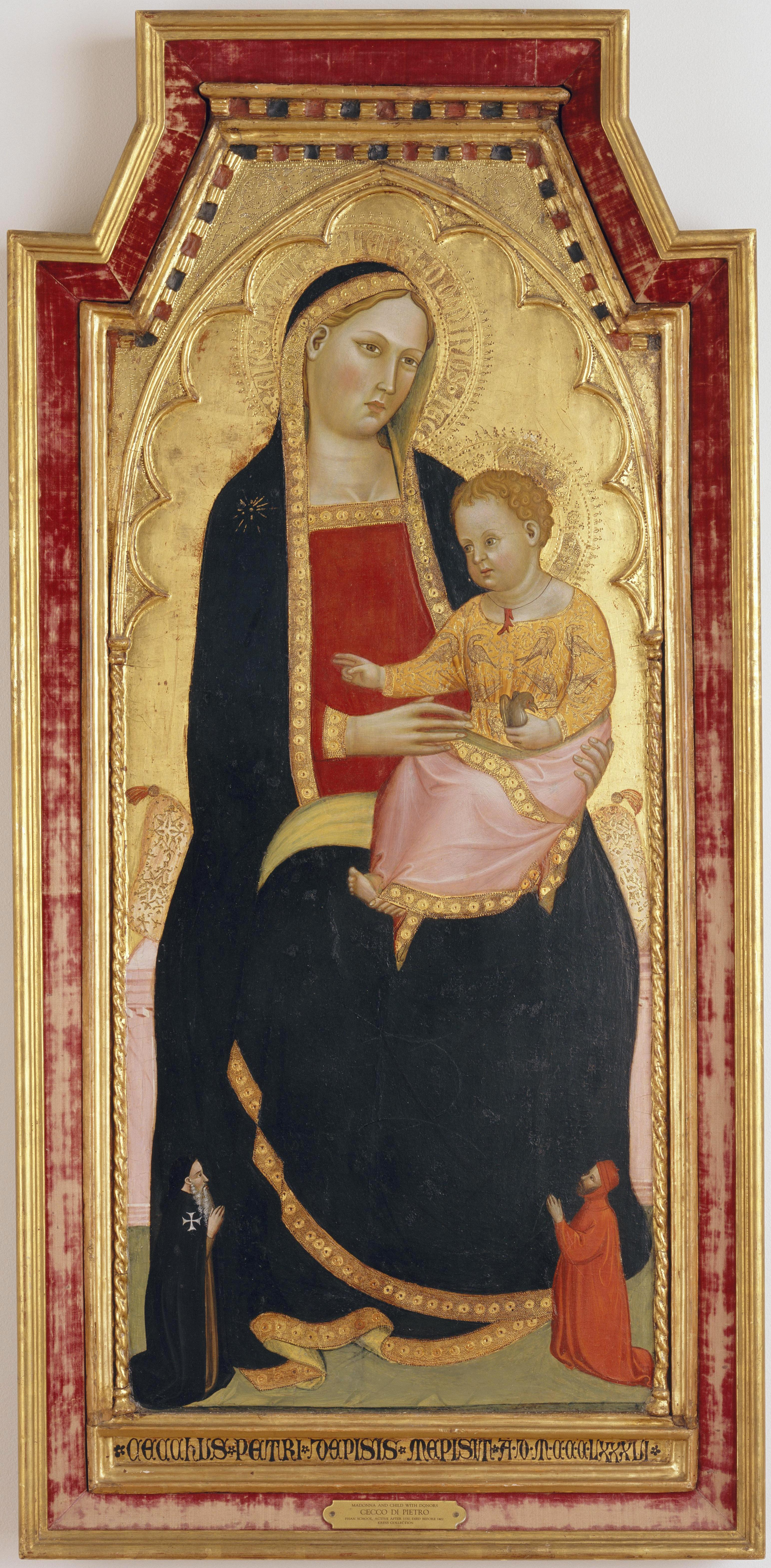
Madonna col Bambino, Portland Art Museum, Portland

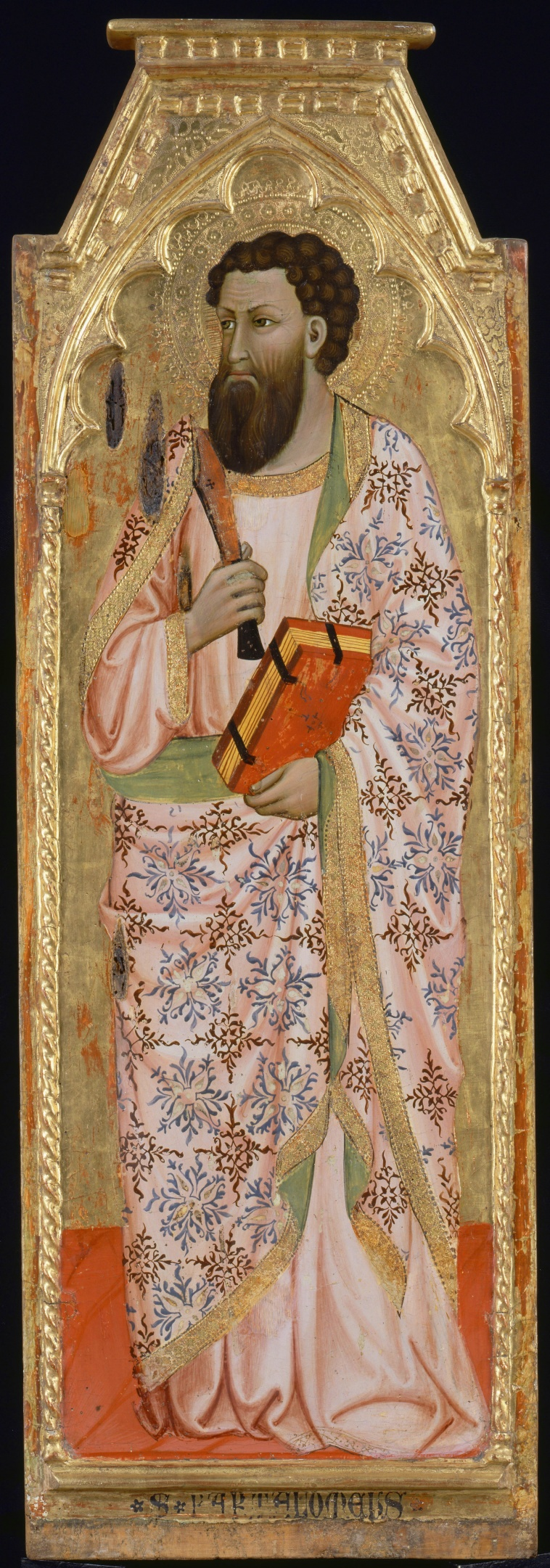
Saint Bartholomew, Musée du Petit Palais, Avignon

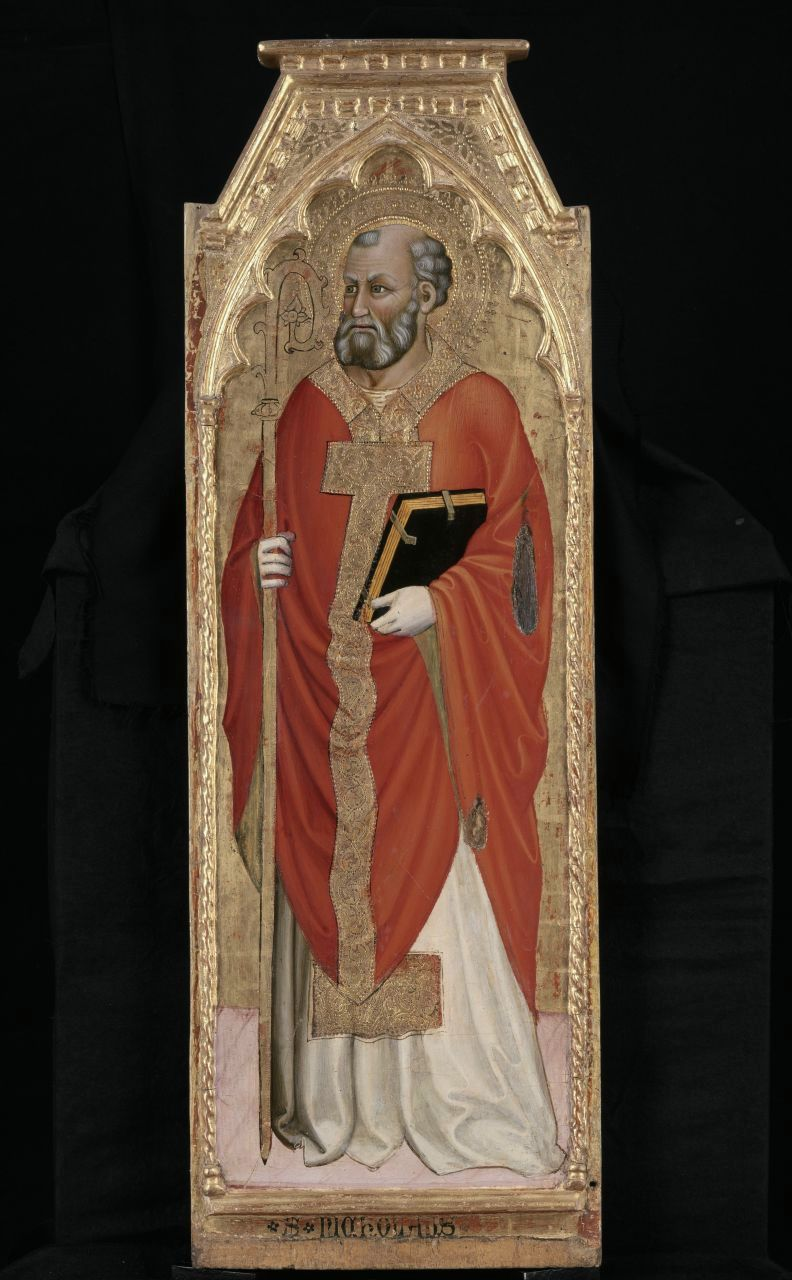
San Nicholaus, Musée du Petit Palais, Avignon

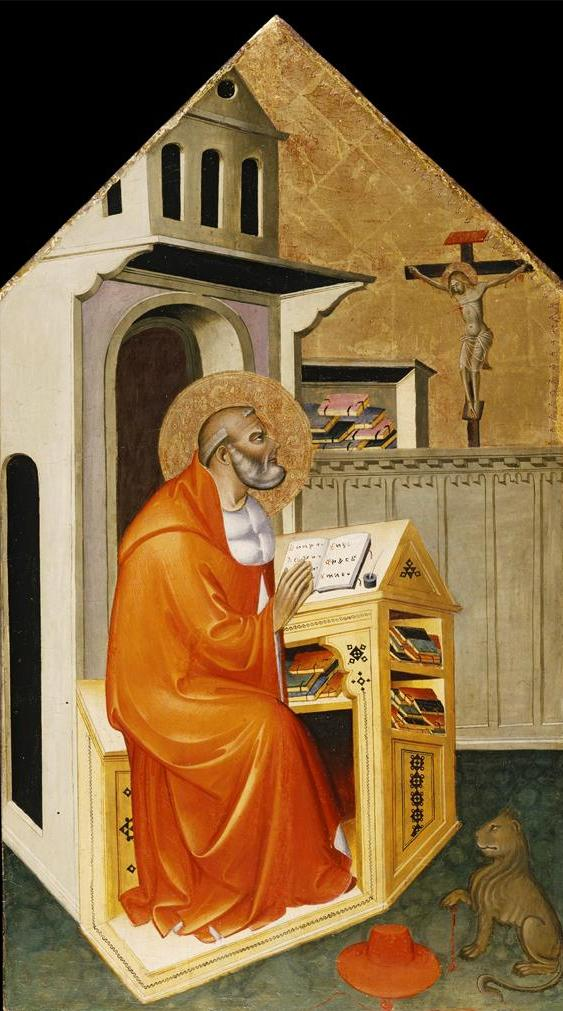
Saint Jerome in the study, North Carolina Museum of Art, Raleigh, North Carolina

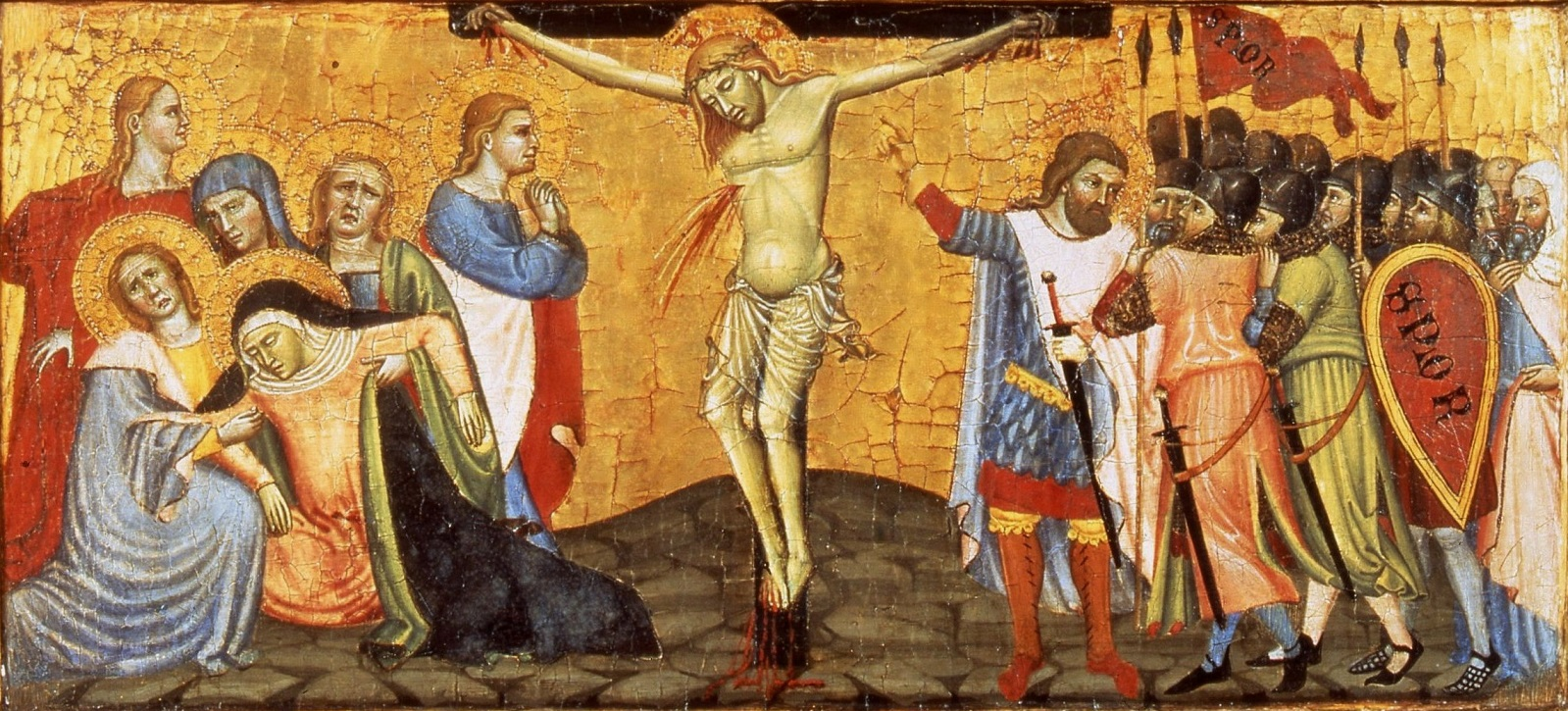
Crucifixion, Museo Nazionale di San Matteo, Pisa

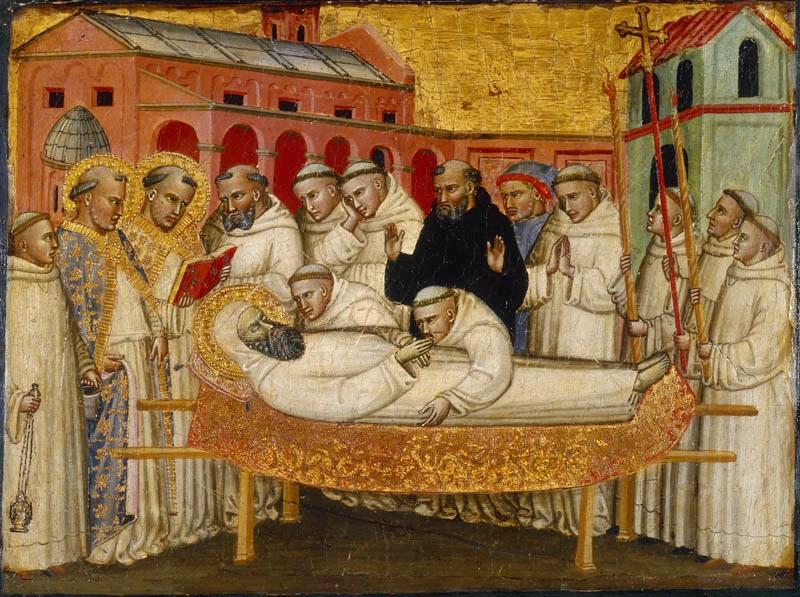
Funeral di San Bernardo, Musée des Beaux-Arts, Dijon

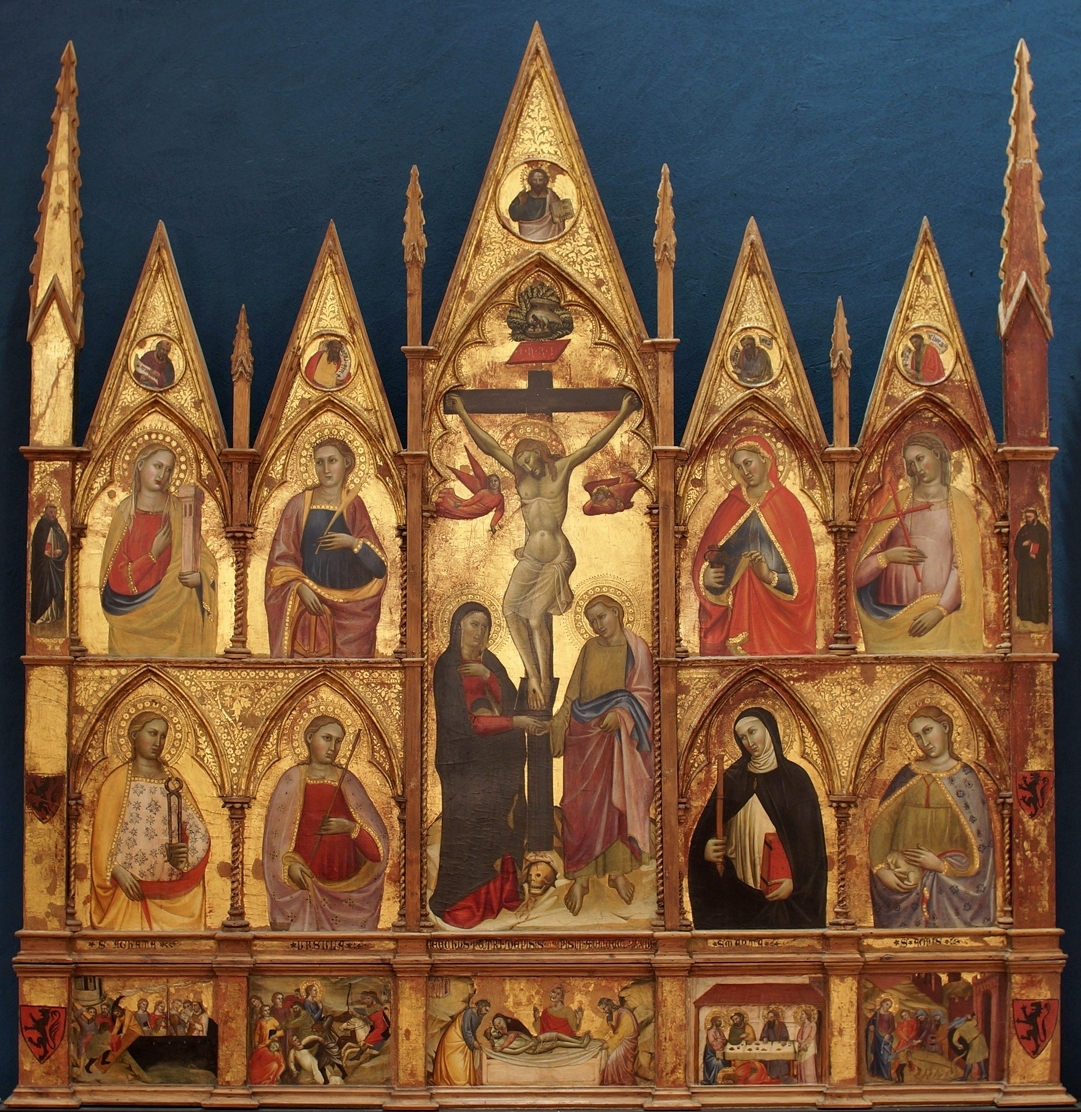
Crucifixion, Museo Nazionale di San Matteo, Pisa

== Bibliography ==
- S. Ciampi, Note inedite della Sagrestia pistoiese, Firenze 1810, pp. 96, 117
- A. Da Morrona, Pisa illustrata nelle arti del disegno, [1787-1793], Livorno 1812, I, p. 433, II, 413
- F. Bonaini, Memorie inedite intorno alla vita e ai dipinti di Francesco Traini, Pisa 1846, pp. 98, 103 ss.
- J. A. Crowe-G. B. Cavalcaselle, A Historyof Painting in Italy, London 1864, I, pp. 393, 448, 450, II, p. 114
- E. Ridolfi, L'arte in Lucca, Lucca 1882, p. 362
- G. Milanesi, Catalogue des tableaux formant la Galerie de M. le Chev. Toscanelli, Firenze 1883, p. 33
- I. B. Supino, Catalogo del Museo civico di Pisa, Pisa 1894, pp. 63 s.
- G. Trenta, L'Inferno e gli altri affreschi del Camposanto, Pisa 1894, pp. 22 s., 28, 50 s., 68
- L. Tanfani Centofanti, Notizie di artisti tratte da documenti pisani, Pisa 1898, pp. 107 s., 193
- A. Venturi, Storia dell'arte italiana, V, Milano 1907, pp. 738, 816, 829, 834
- O. Sirén, TRecento Pictures in American Collections, IV, in The Burlington Magazine, XV (1909), p. 197
- A. Bellini Pietri, La ricomposizione di una tavola di Collezione di Pisa da Pisa, in Notizie d'arte, II(1910), 1-2, pp. 2 s.
- Id., in U. Thieme-F. Becker, Künstlerlexikon, VI, Leipzig 1912, pp. 257 s.
- Id., Guida di Pisa, Pisa 1913, pp. 173 s., 176, 226
- O. Sirén, Maestri primitivi, in Rassegna d'arte, XIV(1914), p. 229
- E. Lavagnino, Pittori pisani del XIV secolo, in L'Arte, XXVI(1923), pp. 40 s.
- R. Van Marle, The Development of the Italian Schools of Painting, V, The Hague 1925, pp. 237, 254 s.
- C. Brandi, La Regia Pinacoteca di Siena, Roma 1933, pp. 322 ss.
- G. Vigni, Pittura del Due e Trecento nel Museo di Pisa, Palermo 1950, pp. 23 ss., 105 s.
- P. Toesca, Il Trecento, Torino 1951, pp. 661 n. 180, 668
- D. C. Shorr, The Christ Child in Devotional Images, New York 1954, ad Indicem
- L. Bertolini-M. Bucci, Camposanto monumentale di Pisa. Affreschi e sinopie, Pisa 1960, pp. 94 s.
- H. Olsen, Italian Paintings in Denmark, Copenhagen 1961, pp. 87 ss.
- E. Carli, Pittura pisana del Trecento. La seconda metà del secolo, Milano 1961, pp. 87 ss.
- M. Laclotte, Musée de Tours. La donation O. Linet, I, in La Revue des arts, XIV(1964), p. 186
- L. Marcucci, Gallerie Nazionali di Firenze, I dipinti toscani del sec. XIV, Roma 1965, pp. 174 s. (rec. di F. Zeri, in Gaz. des Beaux-Arts, s. 6, LXXI [1968], p. 77)
- F. R. Shapley, Paintings from the S. H. Kress Collection 13th-15th Centuries, London 1966, pp. 73 s.
- B. Klesse, Seidenstoffe in der italienischen Malerei, Bern 1967, pp. 306, 310, 382 s.
- M. Boskovits, Un'apertura per Francesco di Neri, in Antichità viva, VI (1967), 2, p. 8
- B. Berenson, Italian Pictures of, the Renaissance. Central Italian and North Italian Schools, London 1968, I, pp. 85 s.; II, figg. 454-460
- C. Volpe, Mostra di dipinti del XIV e XV secolo, Finarte, 6 febbraio-7 marzo 1971, Milano 1971, n. 10
- B. B. Fredericksen-F. Zeri, Census of Pre-Nineteenth-Central Italian Paintings in North American Public Collections, Cambridge, Mass., 1972, pp. 50, 57
- M. Laclotte-E. Mognetti, Avignon-Musée du Petit Palais. Peinture italienne, Paris 1976, nn. 50-53
- E. Carli, Il Museo di Pisa, Pisa 1974, pp. 83–85
- M. Frinta, A Seemingly Florentine Yet Not Really Florentine Altar-Piece, in The Burlington Magazine, 117 (869), 1975, pp. 527–535
- Miklós Boskovits (1979). "Cecco di Pietro". Dizionario Biografico degli Italiani (in Italian). Vol. 23: Cavallucci–Cerretesi. Rome: Istituto dell'Enciclopedia Italiana. ISBN 978-88-12-00032-6.
- K. Ault, A predella panel from Cecco di Pietro's Agnano altar-piece, in The Burlington magazine, 133, 1991, pp. 766–770
- D. Gordon, A possible provenance from the hospital church of San Giovanni della Calza for an altarpiece by Cecco di Pietro, in Predella, 1, 2010, pp. 15-19, I-II
- A. De Marchi, L. Sbaraglio, Ragionamenti sull'attività pisana di Giovanni da Milano, in Predella, 1, 2010, pp. 31–48, VIII-XIII
- C. Gardner von Teuffel, The Buttressed Altarpiece: A Forgotten Aspect of Tuscan Fourteenth Century Altarpiece Design, Jahrbuch Der Berliner Museen, 1979, 21 (January 1), pp. 21–65
- L. Pisani, Nuove Proposte Per Il Polittico Di Agnano Di Cecco Di Pietro, in Predella, 1, 2010
- L. Pisani, Cecco di Pietro ed i fondi oro di Palazzo Blu, Firenze 2011
- M. M. Mascolo, Pittura tra Pisa e Lucca al principio del Quattrocento : alcuni casi dello stile "gotico internazionale", in Predella, 13/14, 2016, pp. 67–81, XXIX-XXXV
