= Rothko Pavilion =

Glass pavilion in Portland, Oregon, U.S.

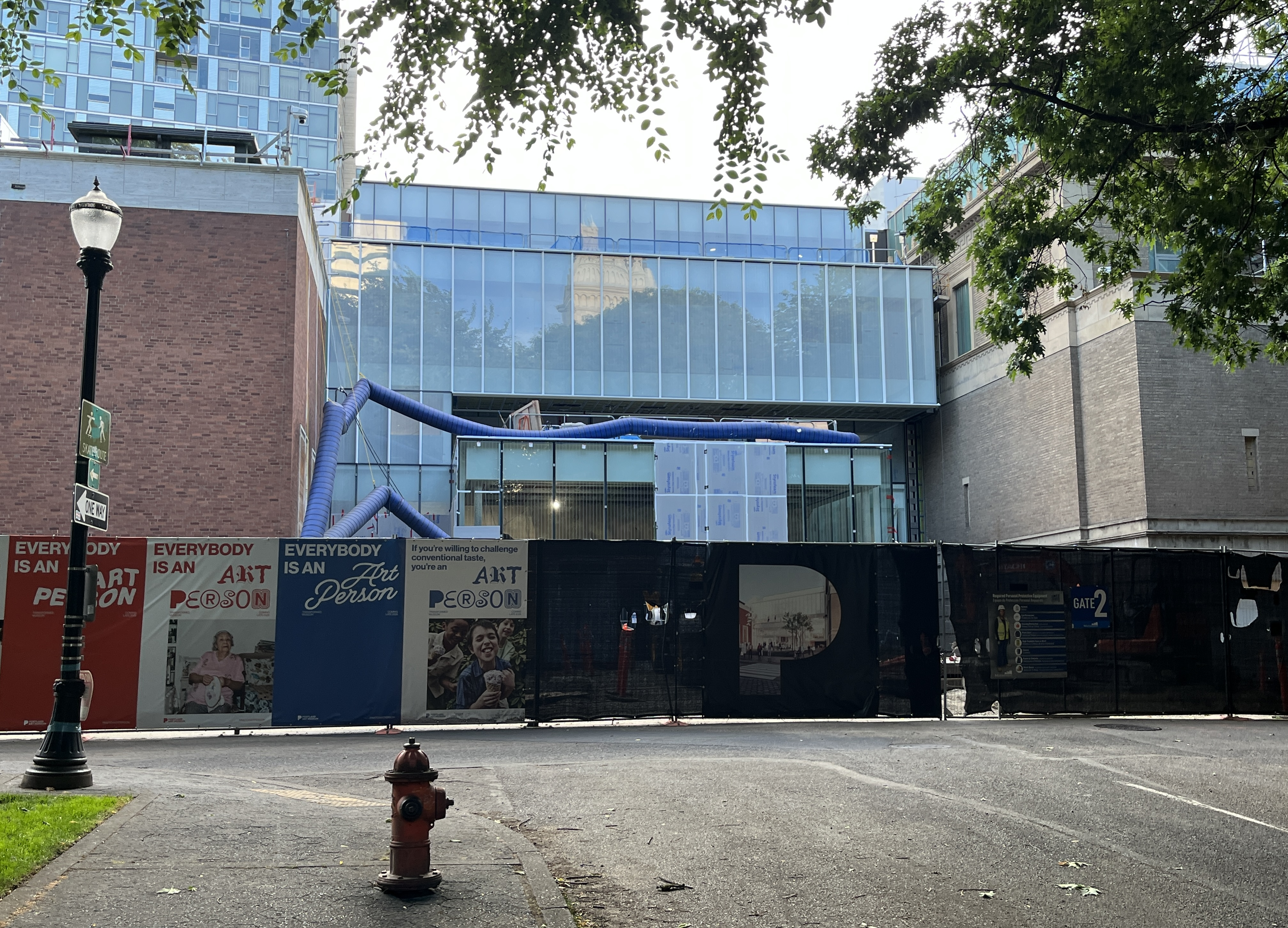
- The pavilion under construction, 2025
- Interactive map of the Rothko Pavilion area

General information
- Status: Completed
- Coordinates: 45.51652°N 122.68317°W
- Construction started: November 2023
- Opened: November 20, 2025
- Cost: $111 million or $116 million

Technical details
- Size: 21,881 square feet (2,032.8 m^{2})

Design and construction
- Architecture firm: Hennebery Eddy, Vinci Hamp

The Rothko Pavilion is a 2,200 m^{2} (24,000 sq ft) glass pavilion in Portland, Oregon, connecting the Portland Art Museum's main building to the neighboring Mark Building.

The building is named after Mark Rothko and is part of a partnership with Rothko’s children, Christopher Rothko and Kate Rothko Prizel, who promised to provide loans of major Rothko paintings from their private collection over the course of two decades.

== Design ==
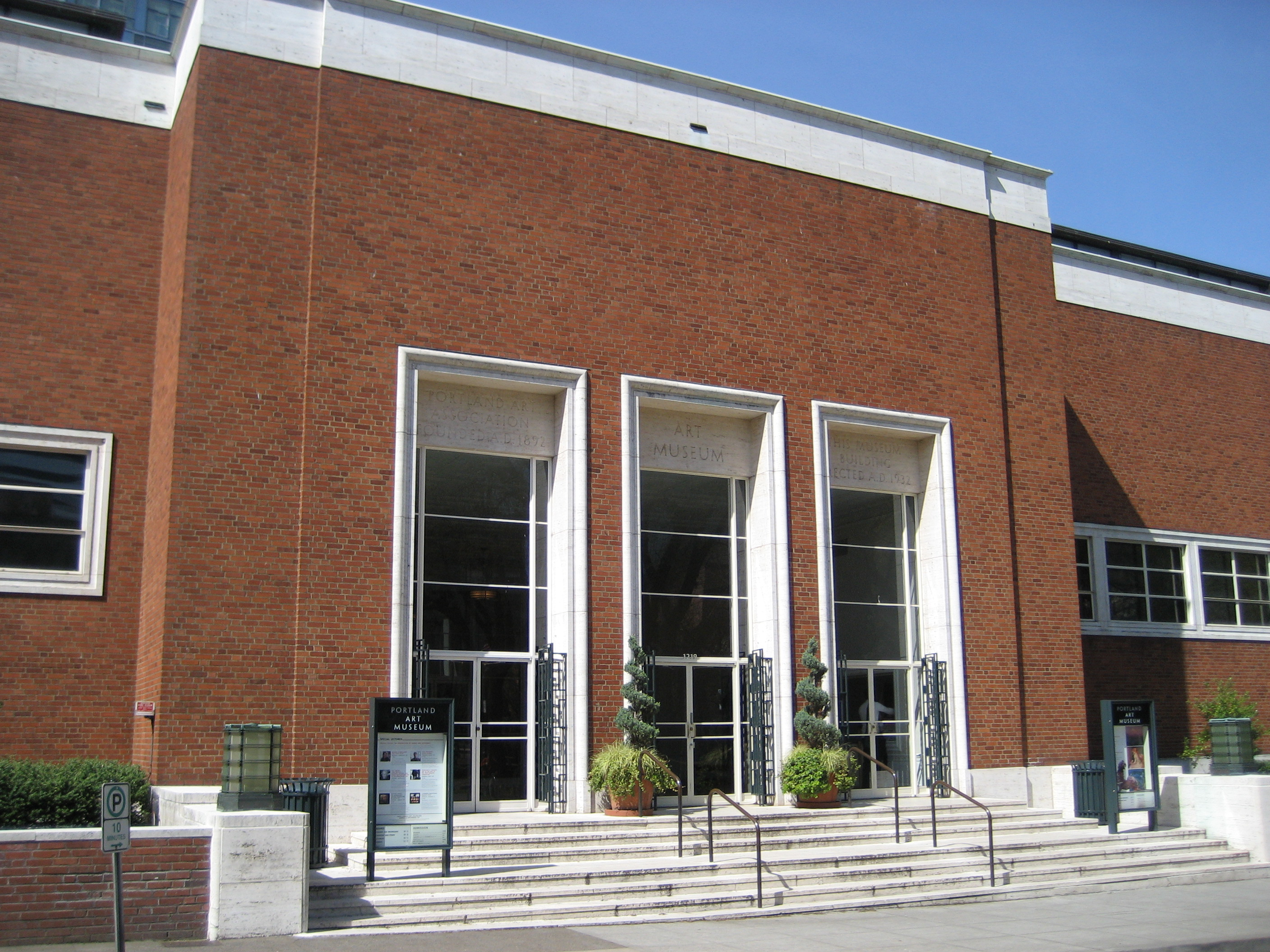

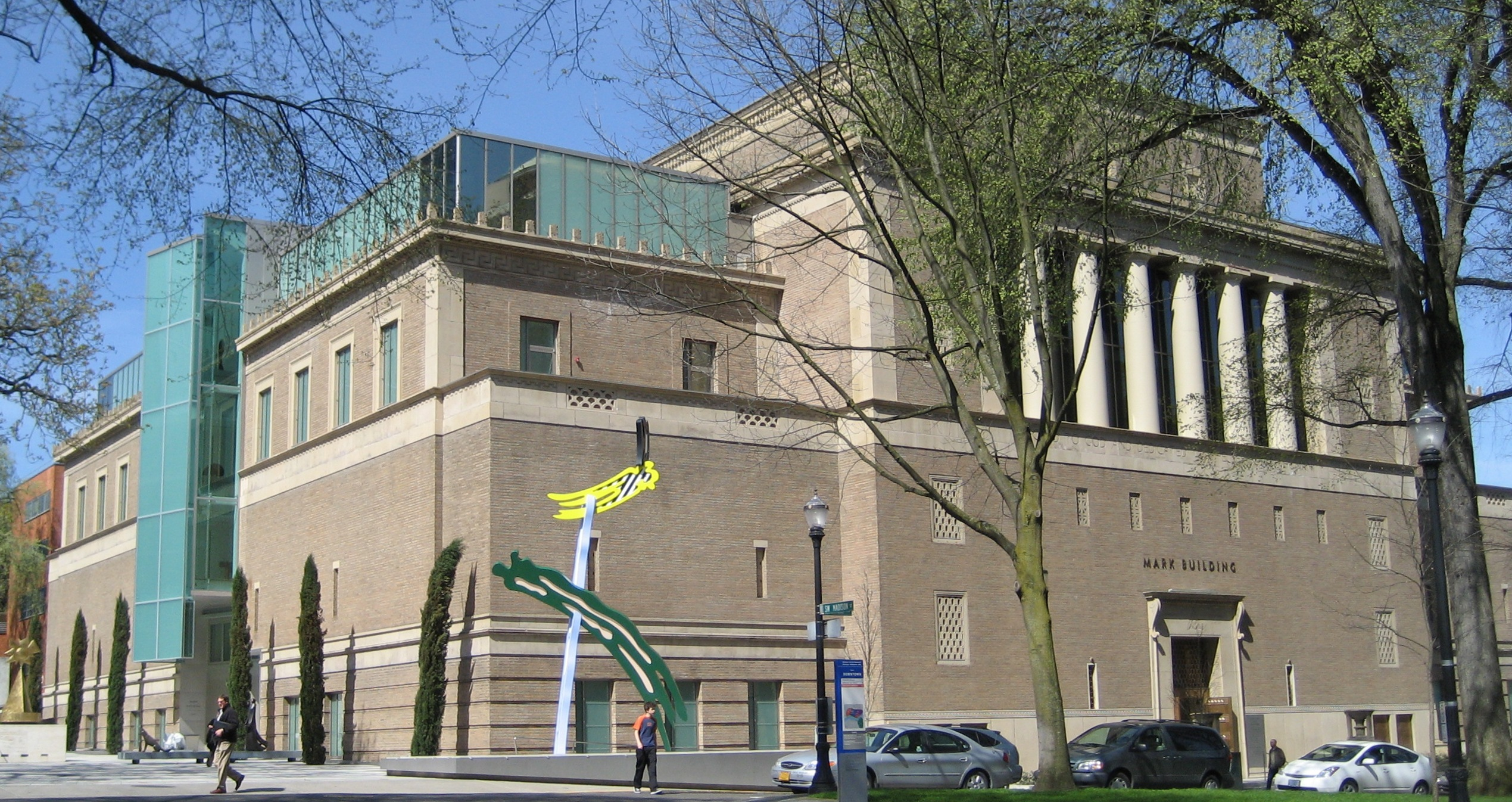
The Rothko Pavilion connects the Portland Art Museum's main building (top) with the Mark Building (bottom).

Designed by the Chicago-based architecture firm Vinci Hamp in collaboration with the Portland-based Hennebery Eddy Architects, the building required a redesign to incorporate a breezeway for accessibility purposes.

== History ==
The project was first announced in 2016, as be the museum's largest expansion since 2005. To pay for project, the museum began a $50 million capital campaign, along with a $25 million campaign to create a dedicated endowment. By May 2017, the museum had raised approximately $27 million for the project.

In May 2019, the project was approved by the city's Historic Landmarks Commission.

In January 2020, the museum received a donation of $10 million from philanthropist Arlene Schnitzer, to be used for the pavilion. The museum said that it hoped to begin construction in fall 2021, though it still had more funds to raise.

The pavilion's steel structure was completed in July 2024. In March 2025, the museum announced a grand opening date of November 20.

The Rothko Pavilion and other renovations to the museum were completed in 2025, with the cost alternatively listed as $111 million or $116 million. The pavilion opened to the public on November 20, 2025, with free admission and events through November 23.
