= Mark Building =

Building in Portland, Oregon, U.S.

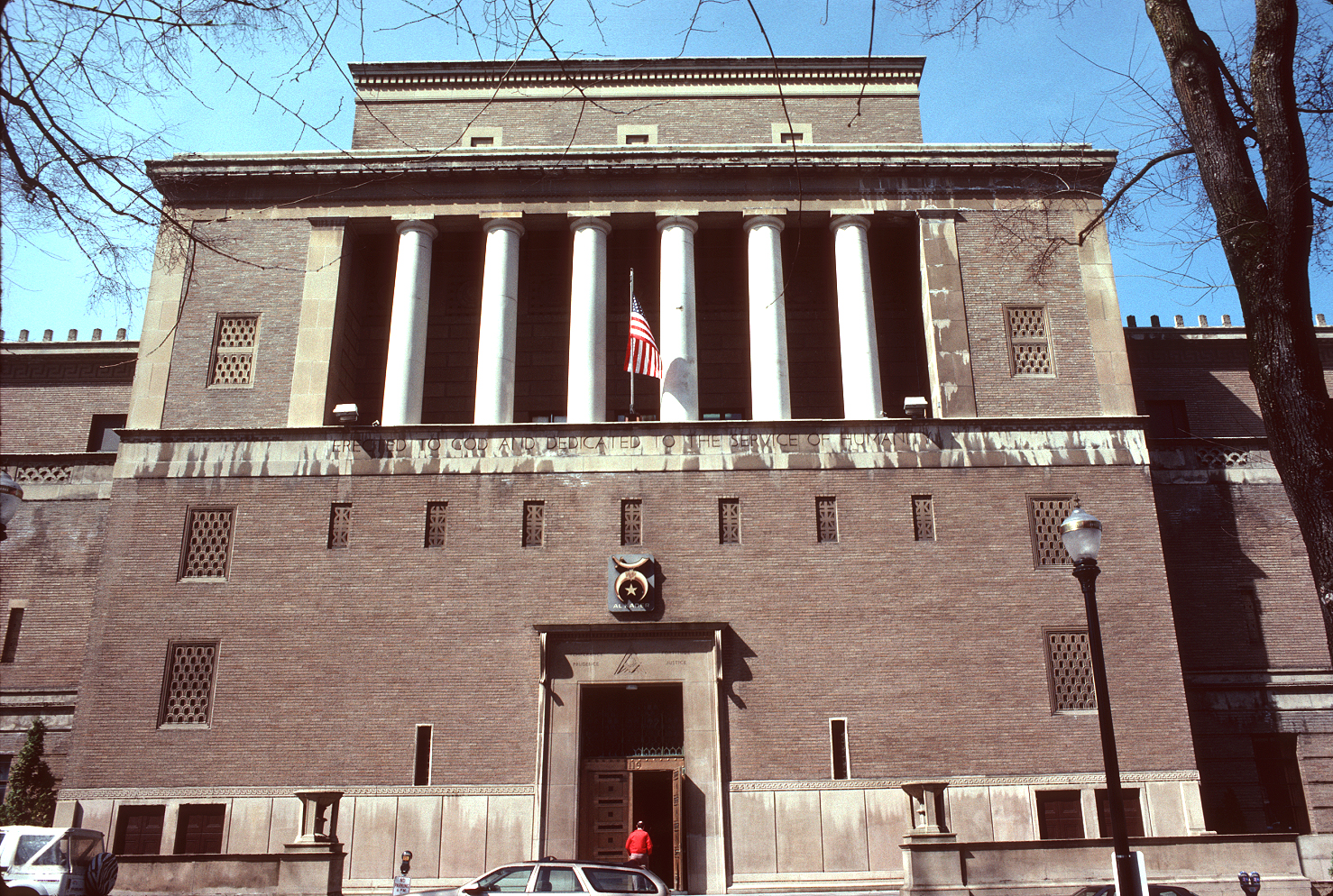
- The building's exterior, 1989
- Interactive map of the Mark Building area

General information
- Location: Portland, Oregon, United States
- Coordinates: 45.5168531°N 122.6831873°W

The Mark Building is a building in Portland, Oregon. It previously served as a Masonic Temple, and was acquired by the Portland Art Museum in 1992. The building was remodeled in 2005 by Ann Beha Architects (later renamed Annum Architects) as the Center for Modern and Contemporary Art. It was subsequently connected to the original Portland Art Museum building with the Rothko Pavilion, designed by Vinci Hamp Architects.

The main entrance to the Mark Building, 2013
