= Portland Art Museum =

Museum in Portland, Oregon, U.S.

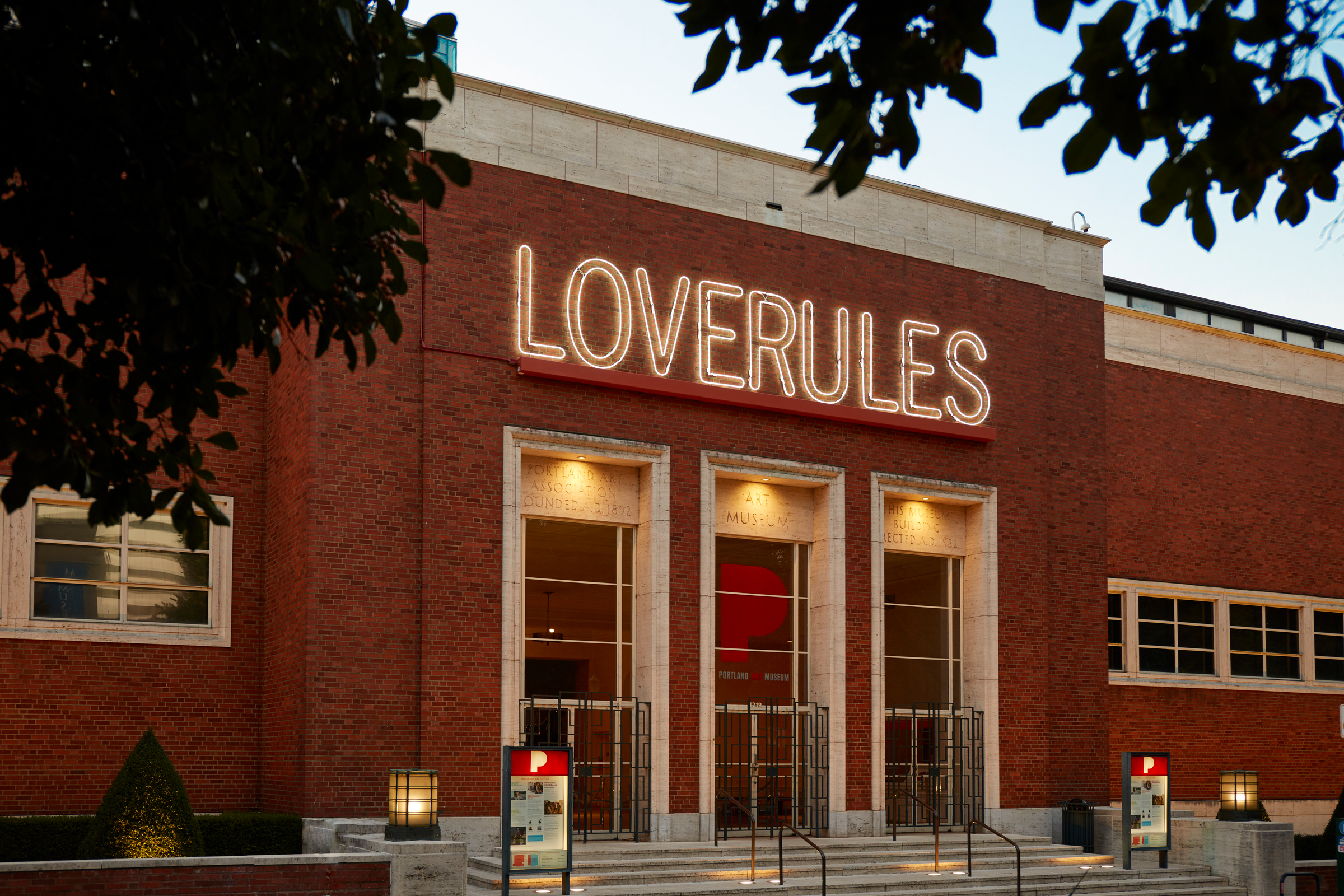
- The Portland Art Museum in 2019
- Established: 1892
- Location: 1219 SW Park Avenue; Portland, Oregon, U.S.
- Coordinates: 45°30′58″N 122°41′01″W
- Type: Art museum
- Accreditation: American Alliance of Museums
- Visitors: 445,000 (2002)
- Director: Michael J. Anderson
- Public transit access: ANS Art Museum BNS 11th and Jefferson
- Website: portlandartmuseum.org
- Portland Art Museum
- U.S. National Register of Historic Places
- Portland Historic Landmark
- Area: 1 acre (0.40 ha)
- Built: 1932
- Architect: Pietro Belluschi
- Architectural style: Modernist
- NRHP reference No.: 74001710
- Added to NRHP: December 31, 1974

The Portland Art Museum (PAM) is an art museum in downtown Portland, Oregon, United States. The Portland Art Museum has 240,000 square feet (22,000 m^{2}), with more than 112,000 square feet (10,400 m^{2}) of gallery space. The museum’s permanent collection has over 42,000 works of art. PAM features a center for Native American art, a center for Northwest art, a center for modern and contemporary art, permanent exhibitions of Asian art, and an outdoor public sculpture garden. The Northwest Film Center is also a component of Portland Art Museum.

The museum is accredited by the American Alliance of Museums, with accreditation through 2024.

== History ==
=== Founding and early history ===
Incorporated as the Portland Art Association, in 1892, seven business and cultural leaders in the city formed an association towards the development of an art museum for the city of Portland, then approaching 50,000 residents. Henry Corbett donated $10,000 to the association that funded the museum's first collection (the Corbett Collection), which consisted of one hundred plaster casts of Greek and Roman sculptures. The individual pieces of the collection were selected by Winslow B. Ayer and his wife during a trip to Europe. Curators at the Metropolitan Museum of Art and the Museum of Fine Arts advised the Ayers prior to the trip on what pieces to select. The collection was originally displayed at the Multnomah County Library located at Southwest Seventh and Stark streets in downtown Portland.

By the time of the Lewis and Clark Centennial Exposition held in Portland in 1905, the Portland Art Association had outgrown its location in the public library and had moved into its own building at SW 5th and Taylor. The first exhibition in the new building featured watercolors and paintings that had come to Portland as part of the 1905 Exposition. Curator Henrietta H. Failing (the niece of founder Henry Failing) organized the exhibition with New England artist Frank DuMond.

In 1908, the museum acquired its first original piece of art, Afternoon Sky, Harney Desert by American impressionist painter Childe Hassam, who frequented Malheur and Harney counties in Eastern Oregon with his friend, C.E.S. Wood. Anna Belle Crocker succeeded Henrietta Failing as curator in 1909, where she remained until her retirement in 1936. Crocker was an important early figure on the association and was the first head of the Museum Art School (opened in 1909 and now the Pacific Northwest College of Art). In late 1913, the museum hosted one of its most important early exhibitions. The exhibition featured artwork that had been on display earlier that year at the famous 1913 New York Armory Show, which introduced American audiences to modern art. The exhibition included works by Cézanne, Van Gogh, Gauguin, Matisse, Manet, Renoir, and the controversial Nude Descending a Staircase, No. 2 by Marcel Duchamp.

The museum continued to grow during the years following World War I. In the 1920s, the museum hosted two memorable exhibitions organized by Sally Lewis, the daughter of a prominent Portland family. Lewis had befriended many well-known artists on trips to New York and Europe. In 1923, Lewis organized an exhibition at the museum that included 44 paintings by Picasso, Matisse, André Derain and American modernists, such as Maurice Prendergast, Charles Burchfield, and Max Weber. She was also one of 22 patrons who purchased Derain's Tree for the museum's permanent collection. The success of her first exhibition led to her second, more daring endeavor a year later that juxtaposed paintings, drawings, and sculptures from Europe with African masks. Among the sculptures was Brâncuși's A Muse, which Lewis owned and donated to the museum in 1959.

The museum's final location opened to the public on November 18, 1932, at the corner of SW Park Avenue and Jefferson Street. The building was designed by architect Pietro Belluschi. It is situated along downtown Portland's South Park Blocks and remains a landmark in the city's Cultural District. It was constructed with a lead gift of $100,000 from Winslow B. Ayer, the same patron who selected the museum's collection of plaster casts 40 years earlier. For this reason, the original portion of today's larger main building is referred to as the Ayer Wing. Belluschi's design was modernist, with an unornamented exterior that reflected Belluschi's belief that the design of the building should emphasize the artwork to be exhibited inside of it rather than emphasize the structure itself.

In April 1938, the museum was registered as a tax exempt nonprofit organization. That same year, construction began on a new wing expansion project. The Hirsch Wing, also designed by Belluschi, was funded largely through the bequest of Ella Hirsch in honor of her parents, Solomon and Josephine Hirsch. The new wing opened on September 15, 1939, and doubled the museum's gallery space.

=== Post war ===
In 1942, the Portland Art Museum celebrated a subdued 50th Anniversary due to World War II. But the following year in 1943, staff completed the museum's first full inventory, which counted a permanent collection of 3,300 objects and 750 works on long-term loan.

The next decade was distinguished by a series of record-setting exhibitions. In 1956, nearly 55,000 visitors came to the museum during the six-week run of an exhibition featuring paintings from the collection of Walter Chrysler. The exhibition was organized by the Portland Art Museum and toured nine other cities. More than 80,000 people visited for a Vincent van Gogh exhibition in 1959, the proceeds from which were used to purchase a 1915 Water Lilies (catalog #1795) by Claude Monet. The 1950s also witnessed the creation of the museum's Docent Council in 1955, which created a core group of volunteers who continue to serve the museum to this day.

In the 1960s, the museum underwent another major renovation to build the Hoffman Memorial Wing, named for L. Hawley Hoffman (1884-1959; son of Portland-based artist and arts patron Julia Christiansen Hoffman), who served as president of the museum twice. Funded by the museum's first capital campaign, the new wing began construction in November 1968 and was finished in September 1970. Pietro Belluschi served as the architect again, and the project allowed him to realize a complete vision for the museum that he had conceived nearly 40 years earlier. The expansion created classroom and studio space for the Museum Art School, a sculpture mall, a new vault for the collections, and an auditorium.

Over the course of the next several decades, the collections and programs of the Portland Art Museum continued to grow and evolve. In 1978, Vivian and Gordon Gilkey began their association with the museum, bringing with them an extraordinary collection of thousands of works on paper that would eventually lead to the opening of the Vivian and Gordon Gilkey Center for Graphic Arts in 1993. Also in 1978, the Northwest Film Center was incorporated into the museum, offering a wide range of film festivals, classes, and outreach programs focused on the moving image arts.

=== Modern era ===
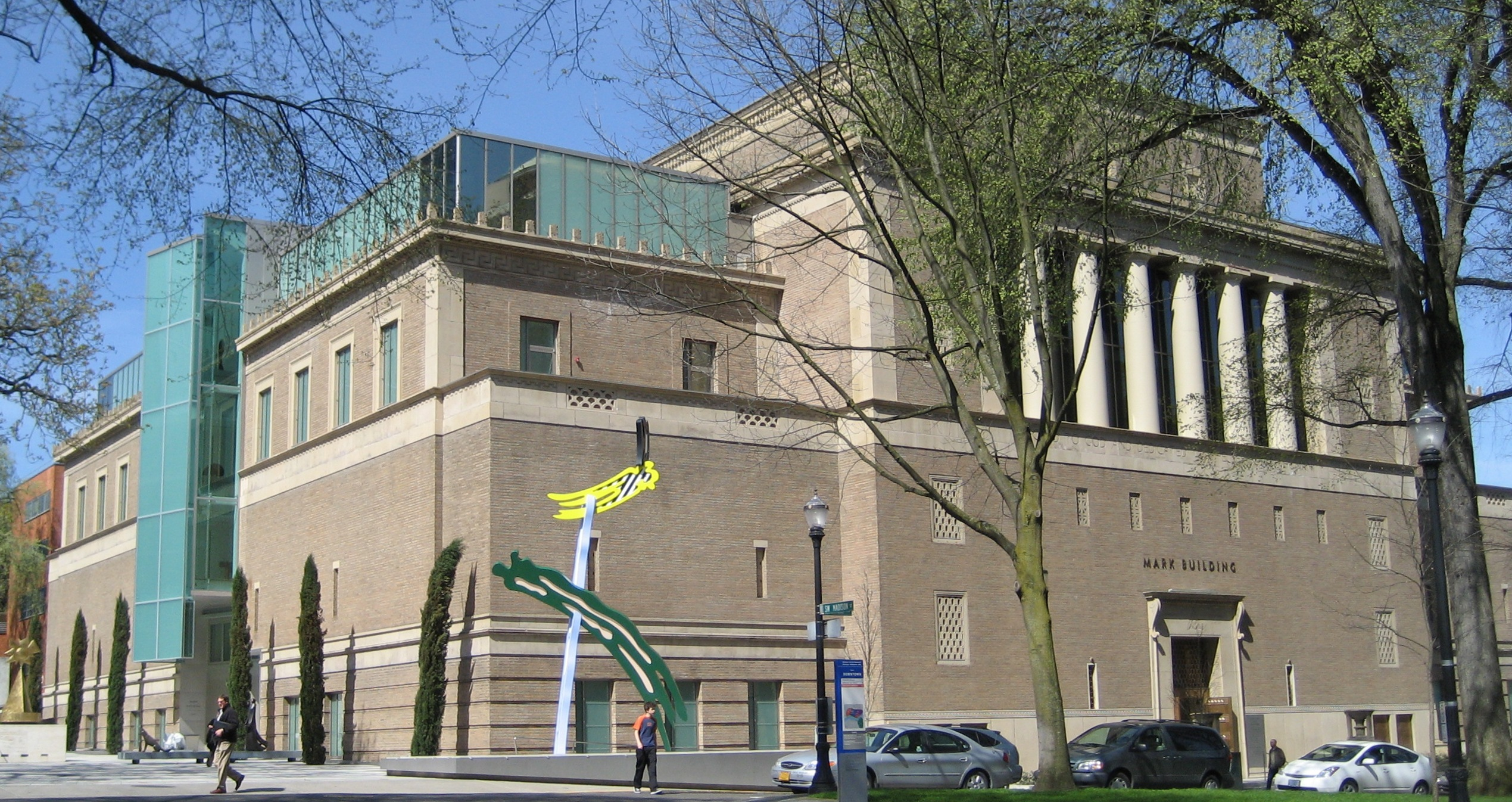
PAM's Mark Building

The Portland Art Museum purchased the neighboring Masonic Temple in 1992. A capital campaign to finance a refurbishment of the Main Building began in 1994. The project improved the galleries, reinstalled the permanent collection, and equipped the building with a climate control system. After the refurbishment was completed, PAM hosted Imperial Tombs of China, which brought 430,000 visitors to the museum.

PAM renovated the former Masonic temple, renamed it the Mark Building, and opened it to the public in 1995. The renovated building holds the six-floor, 28,000-square-foot (2,600 m^{2}) Jubitz Center for Modern and Contemporary Art. The Mark Building also houses the 33,000 volume Crumpacker Family Library, meeting spaces, ballrooms, and administrative offices.

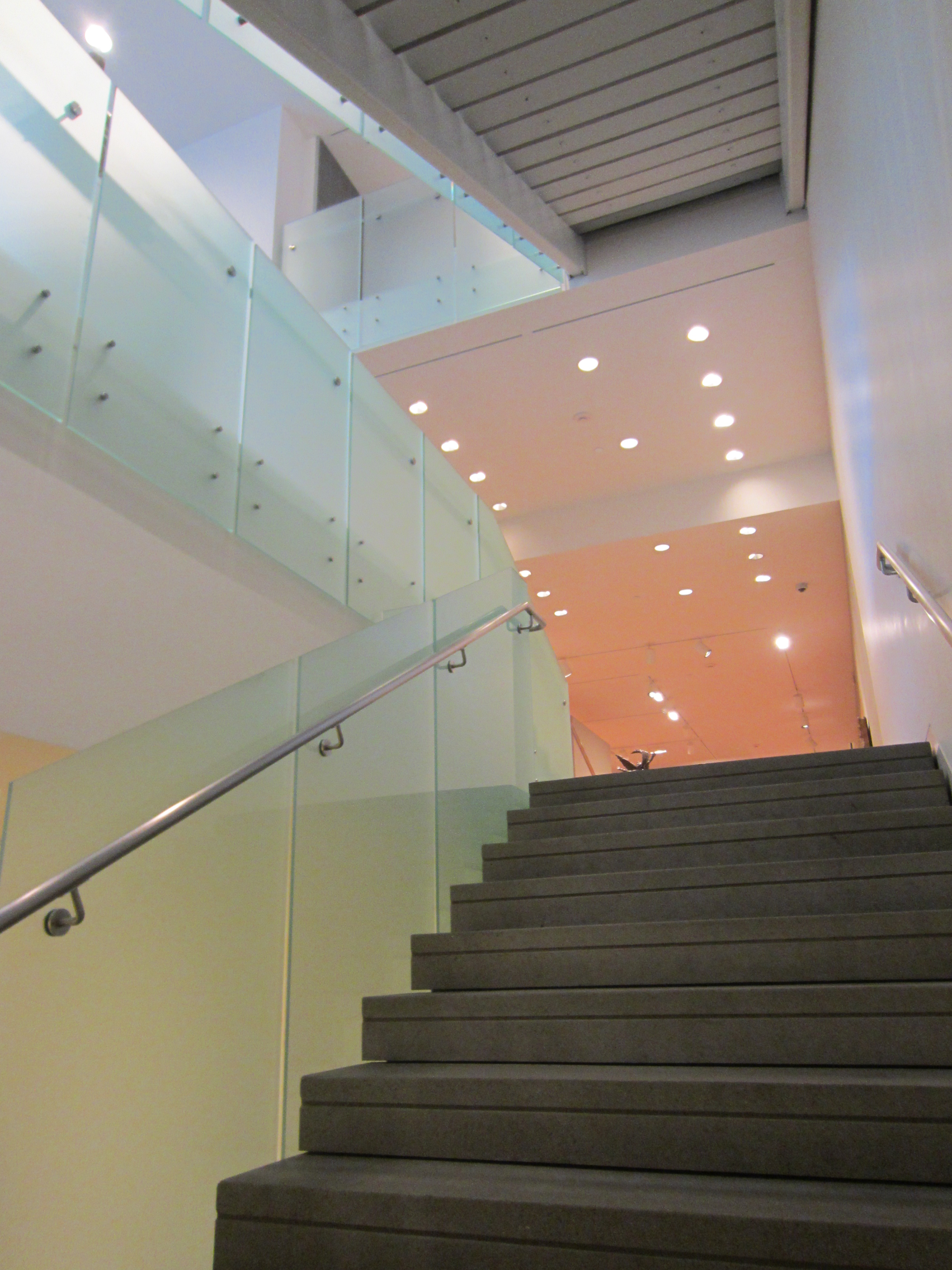
A staircase inside the museum, 2013

A major renovation of the Hoffman Wing was completed in 2000 and added more than 50,000 square feet (5,000 m^{2}) of new gallery space to the museum which included the Grand Ronde Center for Native American Art and the Arlene and Harold Schnitzer Center for Northwest Art. The renovation was funded by a $45 million capital campaign.

In 2001, PAM purchased the private collection of New York art critic Clement Greenberg consisting of 159 works by artists such as Kenneth Noland, Jules Olitski, and Anthony Caro.

In 2007, the museum acquired Vincent van Gogh's 1884 painting The Ox-Cart by donation.

In December 2013, Francis Bacon's Three Studies of Lucian Freud went on display for three months after it was sold at auction.

In 2016, the Portland Art Museum announced that it would undertake a glass-walled expansion to unite its two existing free-standing buildings. The Rothko Pavilion addition was the result of a partnership with Mark Rothko's children, Christopher Rothko and Kate Rothko Prizel, and an agreement they will provide loans of major Rothko paintings from their private collection over the course of the next two decades.

Recent acquisitions include photographs, a few negatives, and color pencil sketches by the Los Angeles photographer Ray McSavaney.

In 2006, former Philbrook Museum of Art director Brian Ferriso was appointed the Portland Art Museum's director, a position he remained in until November 2025. The Rothko Pavilion and other renovations were completed in 2025 at a cost of $116 million. The pavilion opened to the public on November 20, 2025. Michael J. Anderson replaced Ferriso as director in 2026.

== Artworks ==
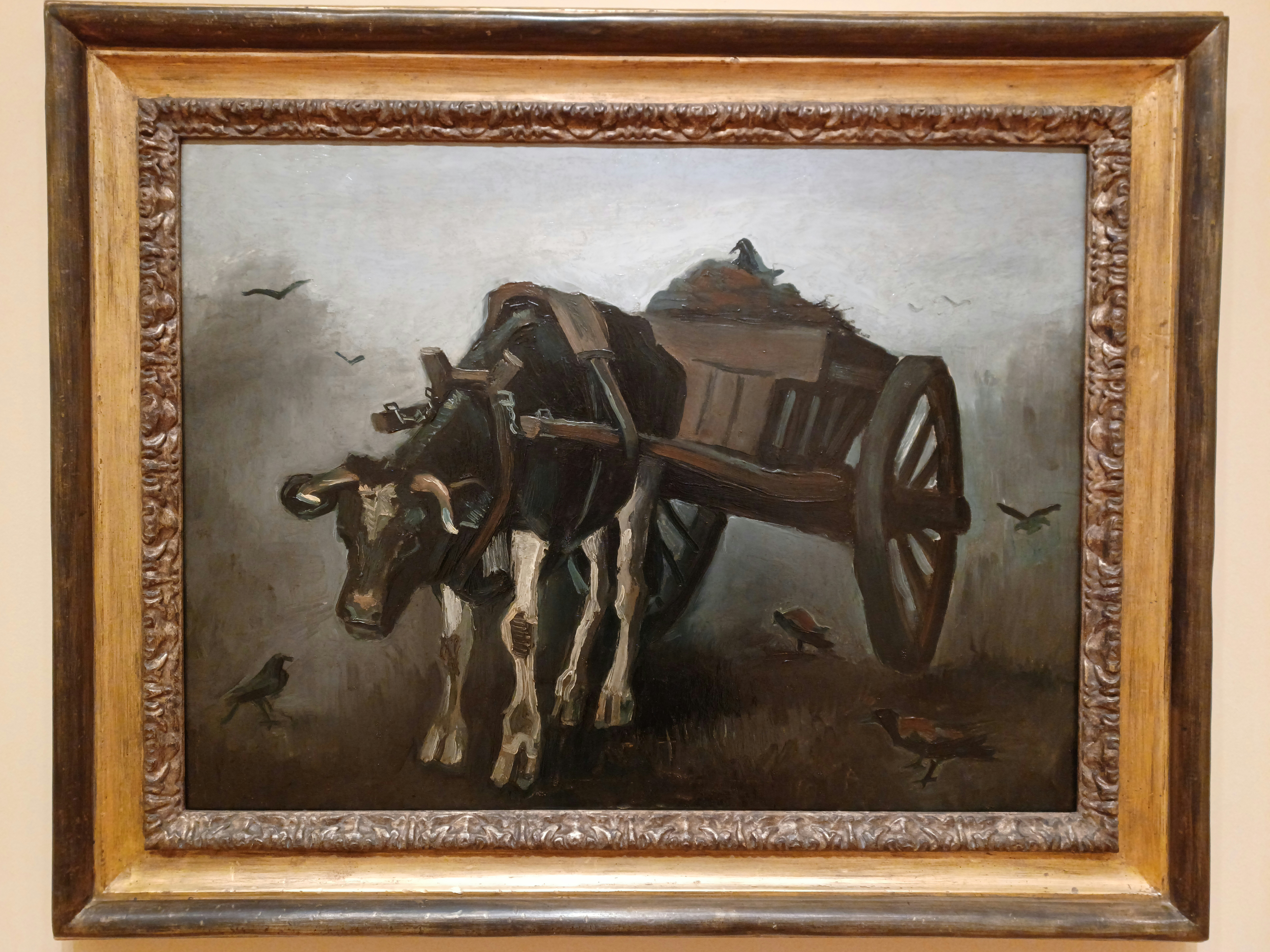
Vincent van Gogh's The Ox-Cart

As of 2025, the Portland Art Museum has a collection of over 50,000 objects and works of art. Among them:

- Castel Gandolfo by George Inness – The American Art Collection
- Mount Hood by Albert Bierstadt – The American Art Collection
- The Finding of Moses (av. 1730) by Giambattista Pittoni
- Arrival of the Westerners by the Kanō school (Edo-period screen) – The Asian Art Collection
- Paris: Quai de Bercy — La Halle aux Vins by Paul Cézanne – The Modern and Contemporary Art Collection
- Water Lilies by Claude Monet – The Modern and Contemporary Art Collection
- The Prince Patutszky Red by Jules Olitski – The Modern and Contemporary Art Collection
- Seine at Argenteuil by Pierre Renoir
- River at Lavacourt by Claude Monet
- The Ox-Cart by Vincent van Gogh
- Nativity by Taddeo Gaddi
- Madonna and Child by Cecco di Pietro
- Allegory Figure of Woman by Franz von Stuck
- Top 'O' the Town by Roger Brown
- A Muse by Constantin Brâncuși
- Likunt Daniel Ailin (The World Stage: Israel) by Kehinde Wiley
- FamilyTreePiles by Nan Curtis
- Nude with Beads (Frida Kahlo) by Diego Rivera

== Oregon Biennial ==
The Oregon Biennial was a biennial art exhibition held every two years at PAM. In 2007, it was replaced by the Contemporary Northwest Art Awards or CNAA, which will be held every two years and covers artists in Oregon, Washington, Idaho, Wyoming and Montana selected from a shortlist of artists. One artist from the CNAA show will be awarded the $10,000 Arlene Schnitzer Prize.

== Crumpacker Family Library ==
The Crumpacker Family Library, founded with the museum in 1892, contains over 40,000 catalogued items.

== Reception ==
PAM won in the Best Arts Organization (Visual Arts) category of Willamette Week's annual 'Best of Portland' readers' poll in 2006. It won in the Best Museum category in 2016, 2017, 2018, 2020, 2024, and 2026. PAM also won in the Best Art Gallery category in 2020 and ranked second in the Best Museum category in 2025.

== See also ==
- Culture of Portland, Oregon
- List of largest art museums
