= Mount Hood (painting) =

1869 oil painting by Albert Bierstadt

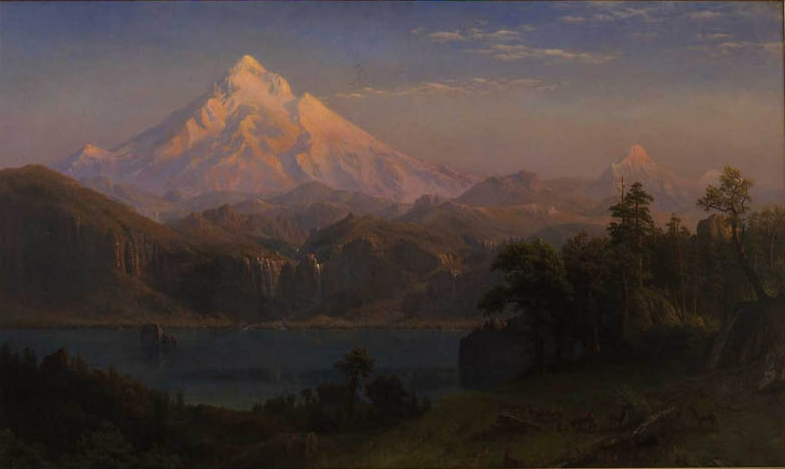
- Artist: Albert Bierstadt
- Year: 1869
- Location: Portland Art Museum, Portland, Oregon, U.S.

Mount Hood is an 1869 painting by the German-American painter Albert Bierstadt, and part of the collection of the Portland Art Museum in Portland, Oregon, in the United States. It portrays a view of the mountain in Oregon with the same name.

To Bierstadt, communicating the metaphor of the monumentality of the American West was more important than making the painting geographically accurate. As a result, many features of the painting were modified from the real landscape, such as the exaggerated height of Mount Hood and different landscape components that could not all be viewed at the same time in a single place along the Columbia River Gorge—showing the mountain as it would be seen from Portland but the landscape as if seen from Multnomah Falls and the northern shore of the Columbia River.

== See also ==
- List of works by Albert Bierstadt
