= Mount Hood (Alberta) =

Mountain in Alberta, Canada

- Location within Alberta Location within Canada

Highest point
- Elevation: 2,903 m (9,524 ft)
- Prominence: 145 m (476 ft)
- Parent peak: Mount Evan-Thomas (3097 m)
- Listing: Mountains of Alberta
- Coordinates: 50°44′48″N 115°5′20″W

Naming
- Etymology: Horace Hood

Geography
- Country: Canada
- Province: Alberta
- Protected area: Kananaskis Country
- Parent range: Opal Range; Canadian Rockies
- Topo map: NTS 82J14 Spray Lakes Reservoir

Mount Hood is a 2,903-metre (9,524-foot) mountain summit located in the Opal Range of the Canadian Rockies of Alberta, Canada.

== History ==
The mountain was named in honour of Rear Admiral Horace Hood who participated in the Battle of Jutland and went down with HMS Invincible.

The mountain's name was made official in 1922 by the Geographical Names Board of Canada.

The first ascent of the peak was made in 1953 by J. Dodds, W. Lemmon, and party.
