= USS Mount Hood =

USS Mount Hood may refer to the following ships of the United States Navy:

- USS Mount Hood (AE-11), an ammunition ship in service during World War II in the Pacific Ocean
- USS Mount Hood (AE-29), an ammunition ship in service from 1971 to 1999
