= Mount Howard Douglas =

Mountain in Banff NP, Alberta, Canada

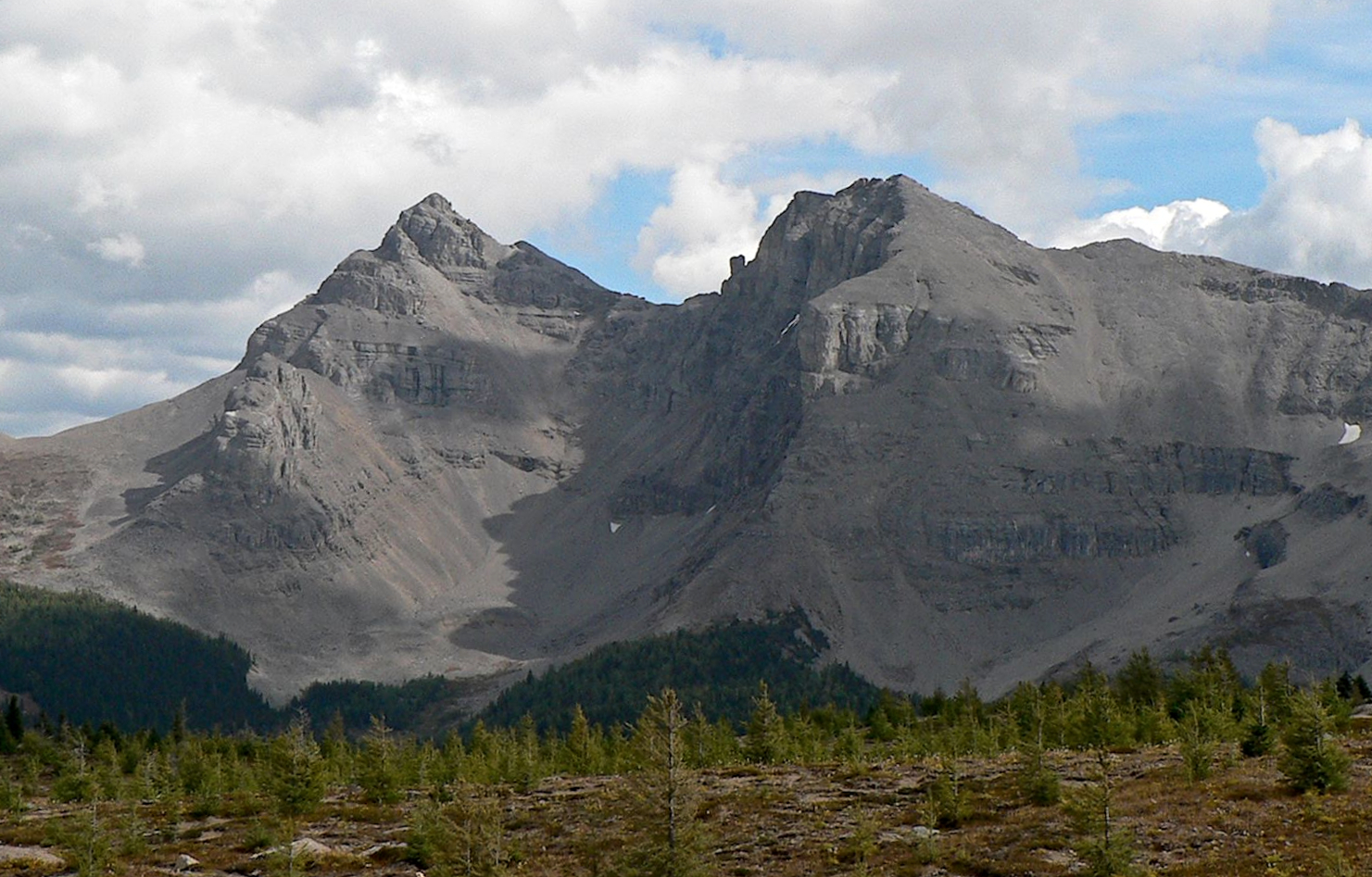
- Mount Howard Douglas seen from the west

Highest point
- Elevation: 2,877 m (9,439 ft)
- Prominence: 632 m (2,073 ft)
- Listing: Mountains of Alberta
- Coordinates: 51°05′05″N 115°43′49″W

Geography
- Location within Alberta Location within Canada
- Location: Banff National Park; Alberta, Canada
- Parent range: Canadian Rockies
- Topo map: NTS 82O4 Banff

Mount Howard Douglas is a 2,877-metre (9,439-foot) mountain summit located immediately east of the Banff Sunshine ski resort in Banff National Park of Alberta, Canada. It was named for Howard Douglas (1850-1929), a park superintendent credited with greatly expanding its size. The mountain's name was officially adopted in 1958 when approved by the Geographical Names Board of Canada. Its nearest higher peak is Mount Bourgeau, 4.55 km (2.83 mi) to the north-northwest.

== Geology ==
Like other mountains in Banff Park, Mount Howard Douglas is composed of sedimentary rock laid down from the Precambrian to Jurassic periods. Formed in shallow seas, this sedimentary rock was pushed east and over the top of younger rock during the Laramide orogeny.

== Climate ==
Based on the Köppen climate classification, Mount Howard Douglas is located in a subarctic climate zone with cold, snowy winters, and mild summers. Winter temperatures can drop below -20 °C with wind chill factors below -30 °C. Precipitation runoff from Mount Howard Douglas drains into tributaries of the Bow River.

== Gallery ==
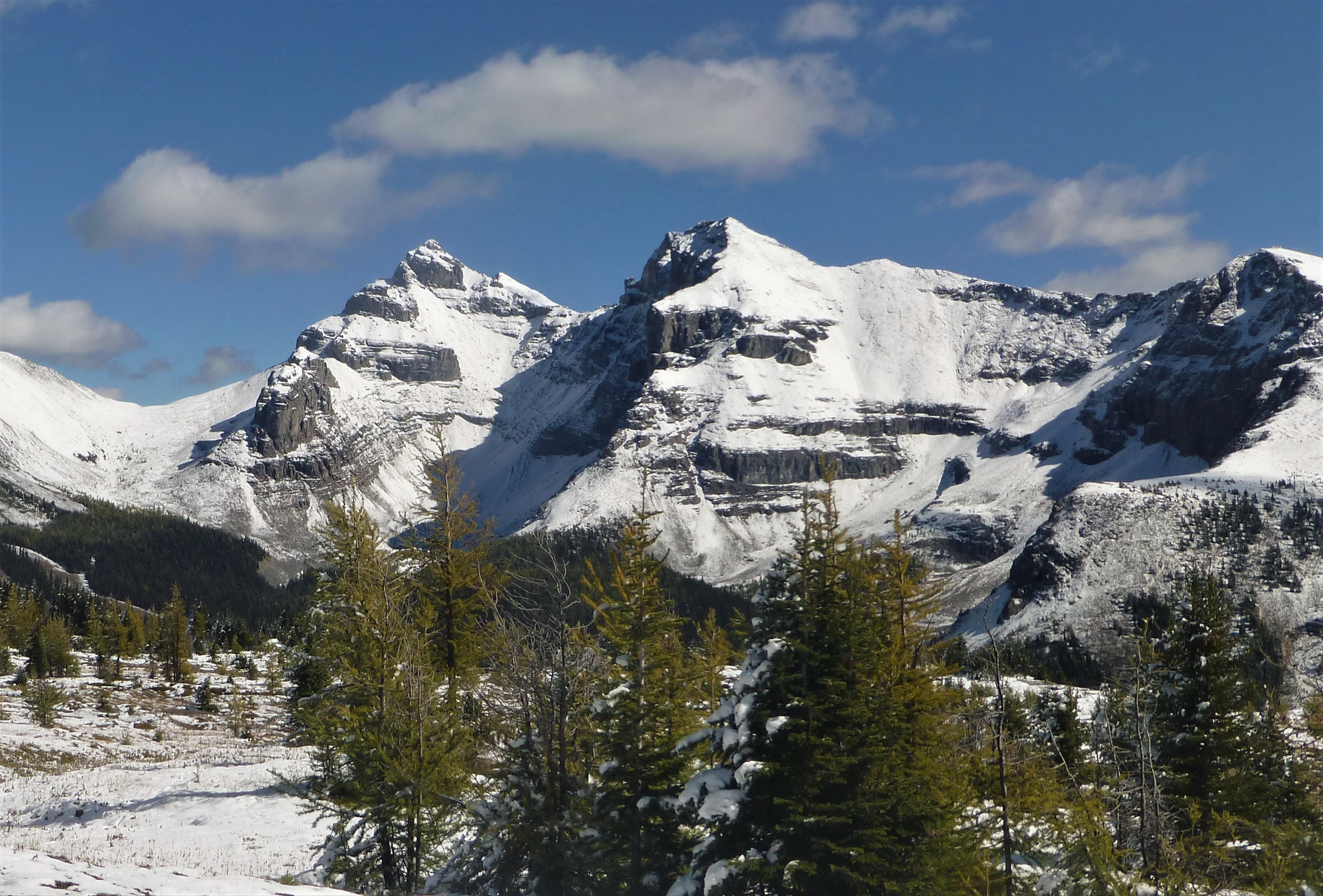
Mount Howard Douglas

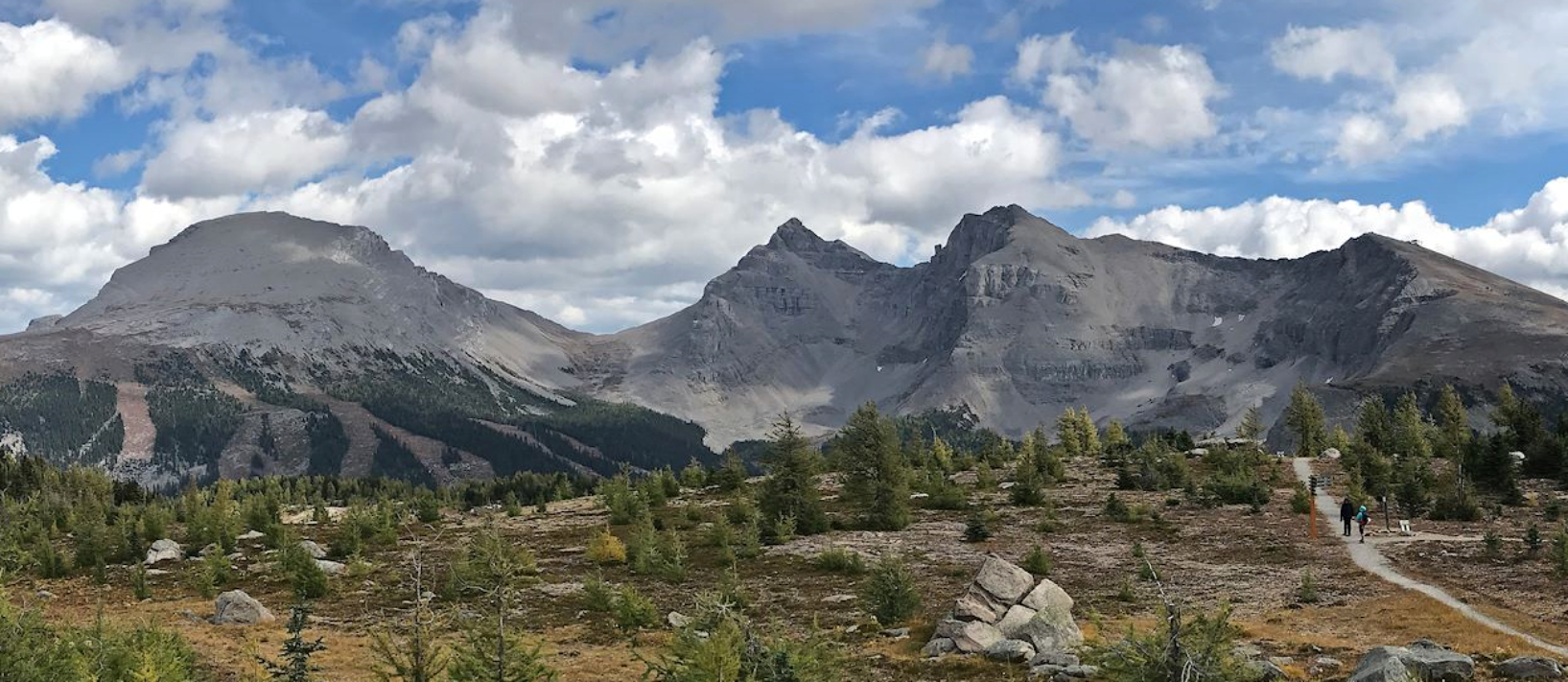
Eagle Mountain (left) and Mt. Howard Douglas

== See also ==
- Geography of Alberta
