= Bourgeau Lake =

Lake in Banff NP, Alberta, Canada

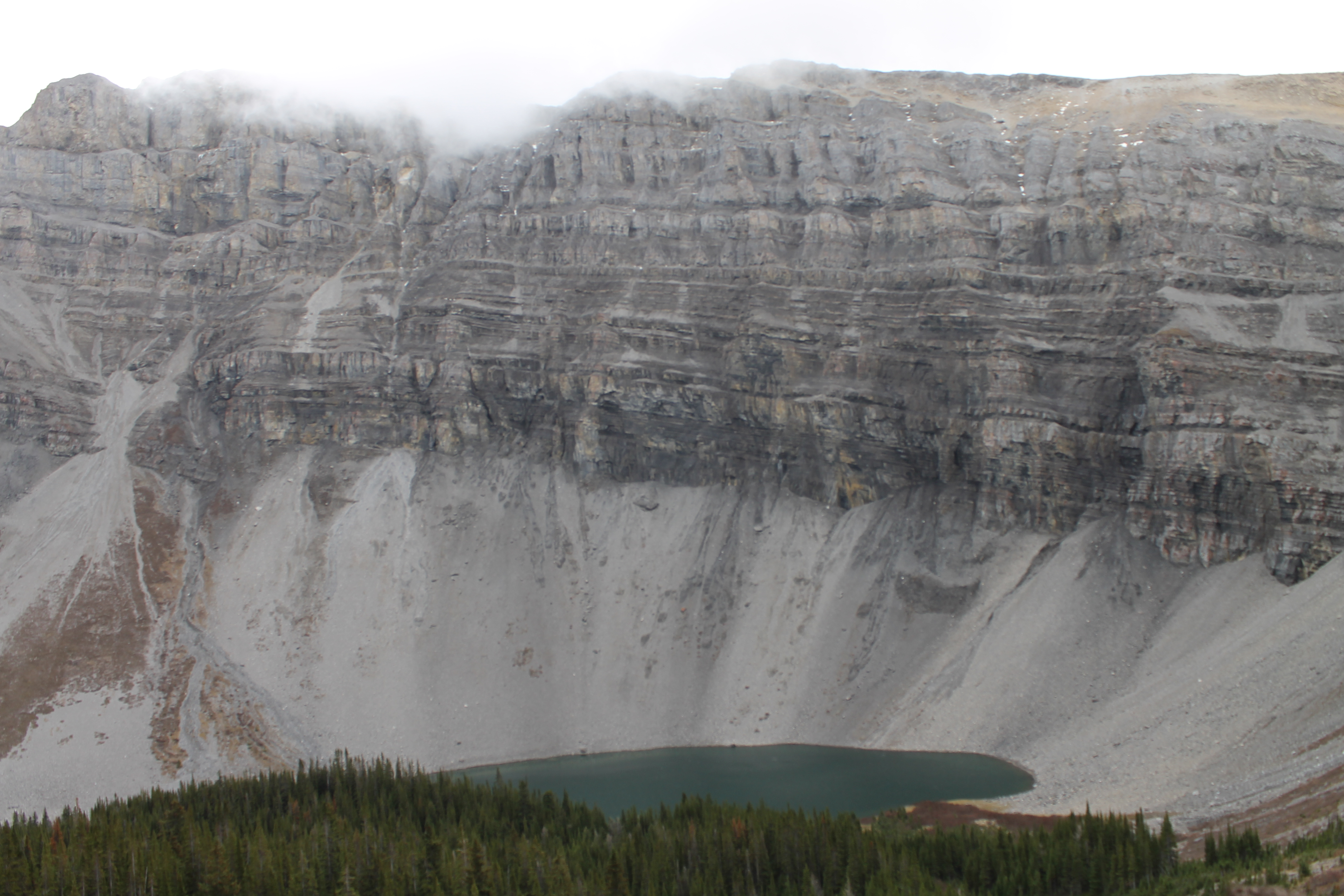

- Location within Alberta
- Location: Banff National Park, Alberta
- Coordinates: 51°08′07″N 115°47′25″W
- Type: Glacial lake
- Basin countries: Canada
- Max. depth: Unknown

Bourgeau Lake is a rock-rimmed alpine lake at the foot of Mount Bourgeau near Banff, in Banff National Park, Alberta. It is a popular hiking destination. The trailhead is located at the Bourgeau Lake parking lot on the southwest side of the Trans-Canada Highway, 2.9 km (1.8 mi) from the turnoff for the Banff Sunshine ski resort. The hike takes on average 2.5 to 3 hours one way and ascends 725 m (2,380 ft) to a maximum elevation of 2,160 m (7,090 ft) The trail to the summit of Mt. Bourgeau starts at the western end of the lake.
