= Massive Mountain =

Mountain in Banff NP, Alberta, Canada

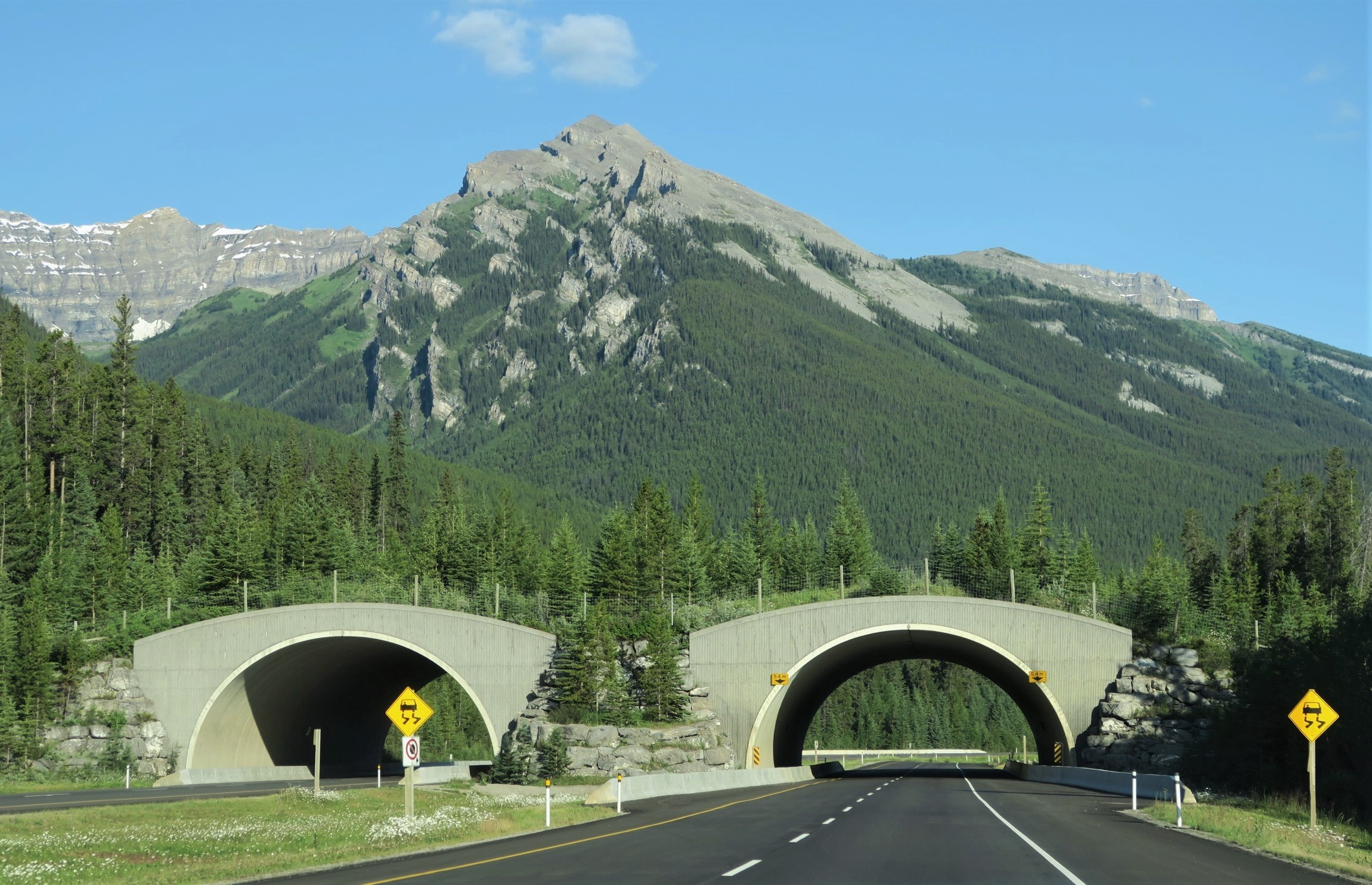
- Massive Mountain (upper right)

Highest point
- Elevation: 2,435 m (7,989 ft)
- Prominence: 88 m (289 ft)
- Parent peak: Mount Brett
- Listing: List of mountains of Alberta
- Coordinates: 51°10′54″N 115°47′41″W

Geography
- Location within Alberta Location within Canada
- Location: Alberta, Canada
- Parent range: Massive Range; Canadian Rockies
- Topo map: NTS 82O4 Banff

Massive Mountain is situated in Banff National Park, Alberta, Canada. It is located in the Massive Range and was named in 1918 for its massive size. It however is not the highest summit in the range, that belongs to Mount Brett (2,984 m (9,790 ft)).

== Geology ==
The mountain is composed of sedimentary rock laid down during the Precambrian to Jurassic periods. Formed in shallow seas, this sedimentary rock was pushed east and over the top of younger rock during the Laramide orogeny.

== Climate ==
Based on the Köppen climate classification, it is located in a subarctic climate with cold, snowy winters, and mild summers. Winter temperatures can drop below -20 °C with wind chill factors below -30 °C.

== Gallery ==
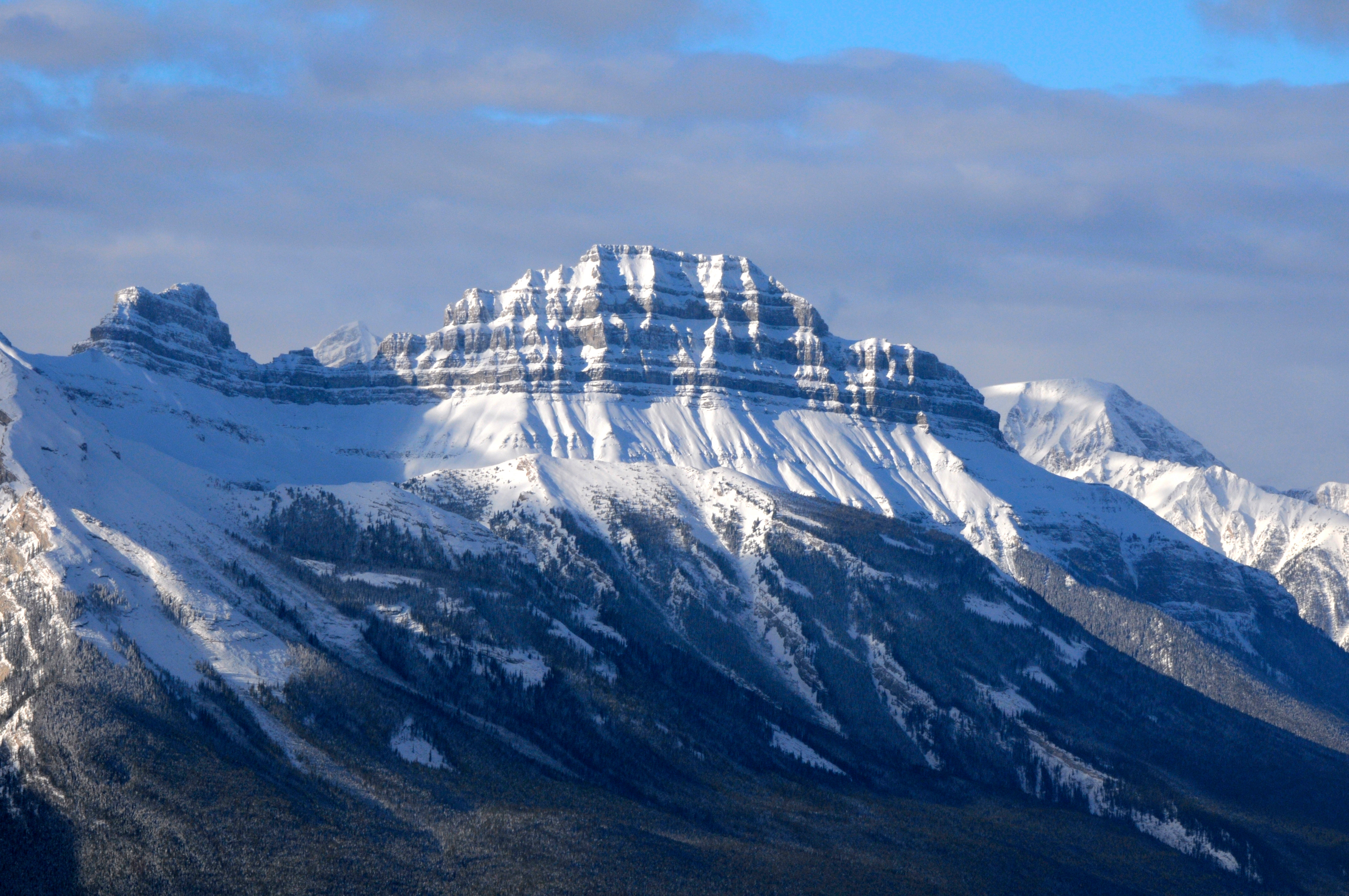
Pilot Peak is centered with Massive Mountain below it

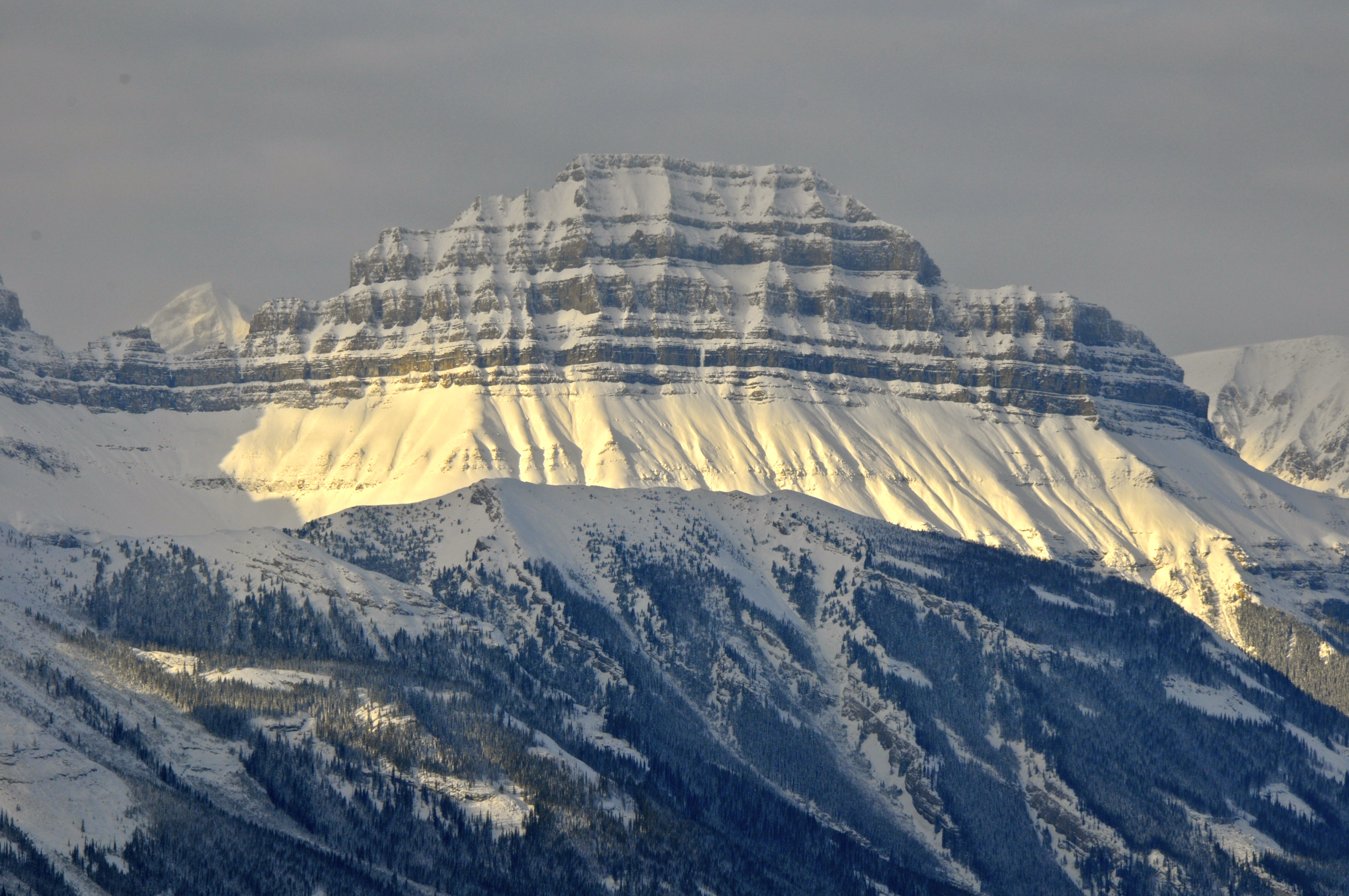
Pilot Peak is centered with Massive Mountain below it
