= Ralph Scurfield =

Ralph Scurfield may refer to:

- Ralph D. Scurfield (born 1956), CEO and President Sunshine Village
- Ralph M. Scurfield (born 1928), former long-term chairman of the California Horse Racing Board
- Ralph Thomas Scurfield (1928–1985), Canadian businessman and owner of the Calgary Flames
