= Massive Range =

Mountain range in Banff NP, Canada

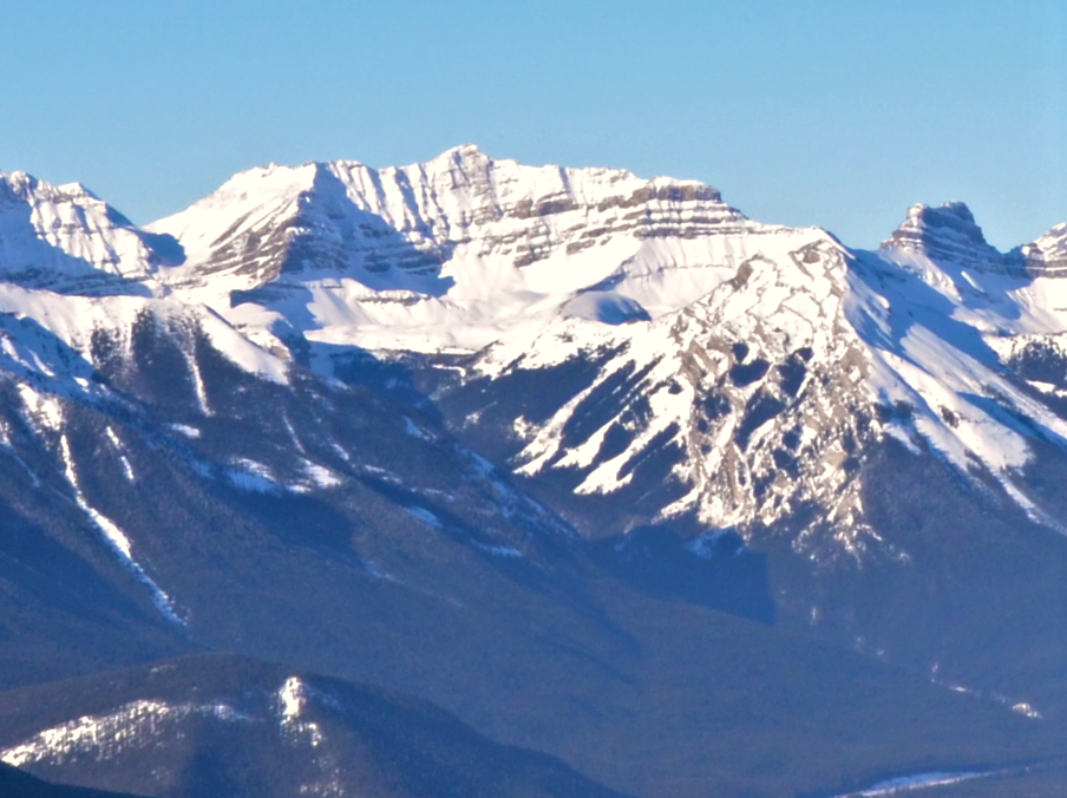
- Mount Brett

Highest point
- Peak: Mount Brett
- Elevation: 2,984 m (9,790 ft)
- Coordinates: 51°09′42″N 115°49′18″W

Dimensions
- Length: 15 km (9.3 mi) N-S
- Width: 16 km (9.9 mi) E-W
- Area: 144 km^{2} (56 mi^{2})

Geography
- Location within Alberta
- Country: Canada
- Province: Alberta
- Range coordinates: 51°09′42″N 115°49′10″W
- Parent range: Canadian Rockies
- Borders on: Sawback Range

The Massive Range is a mountain range of the Canadian Rockies, located in the southwestern area of the Bow River valley in Banff National Park, Canada.

This range includes the following mountains and peaks:

Mountain/Peak	metres	feet
Mount Brett	2,984	9,790
Pilot Mountain	2,935	9,629
Mount Bourgeau	2,930	9,613
Massive Mountain	2,435	7,889

== Geology ==
The rock layers on the western side of the Sawback Range dip below the Bow River valley and rise again on the western side under Massive Mountain. Pilot Mountain, Mt. Brett and Mt. Bourgeau are peaks in another block of Palaeozoic rocks thrust from the west over slightly younger rocks of the Massive Range.
