= Sunshine Meadows =

The Sunshine Meadows are a natural garden set at an altitude of approximately 2,300 metres (7,500 feet). It is located within the peaks of the Canadian Rocky Mountains of Banff National Park. From the vantage point of Sunshine Meadows one has a clear view of Mount Assiniboine, the highest peak in the region at 3,618 metres (11,870 feet). Sunshine Meadows is located 18 km directly southwest of Banff, Alberta, and spans along both sides of the Continental Divide (between Alberta and British Columbia).

== Access ==
There is no public road access to Sunshine Meadows, and thus it can be reached either by hiking several kilometres from the area of the Sunshine Village ski resort, located near the resort town of Banff, or by using the Gondola (Fri-Mon) or Alpine Shuttle Bus (Tues-Thurs) which departs from the Sunshine Village base area. You can book tickets for the shuttle or gondola in advance at http://www.banffsunshinemeadows.com . Guided group hikes with lunch and transportation from Banff is also available. Sunshine Meadows has established a system of well-graded, hardened trails to take the hiker out into the surrounding sub-alpine and above tree line habitats. Visitors to the meadows are required to stay on these trails to protect the fragile alpine vegetation.

The main hiking trail travels past Rock Isle Lake, continuing west of the ski area, before finally descending back down to the Sunshine Village Day Lodge. This 5.8 km loop has an elevation gain of 170 metres. Other trails branch off from this main loop to other regions of the meadows.

== Scenery ==
It is the unique mountain scenery which makes Sunshine Meadows a notable habitat. Sunshine Meadows offers a colourful array of wildflowers and other alpine tree line vegetation. The fragile alpine terrain has a growing season of just a few months, as the area is covered by snow October to mid-June. Situated at 2,300 metres, the temperatures drop below freezing in every month of the year. In July and August temperatures can range from 30 degrees Celsius above zero to freezing. The field of fragile wildflowers and lichens blooms into colour in mid-June, and nature is in full bloom July through August. In September the scenery alters dramatically, with the larches turning yellow and red in the season's final burst of colour.
