= Pilot Mountain (Alberta) =

Mountain in Banff National Park, Alberta, Canada

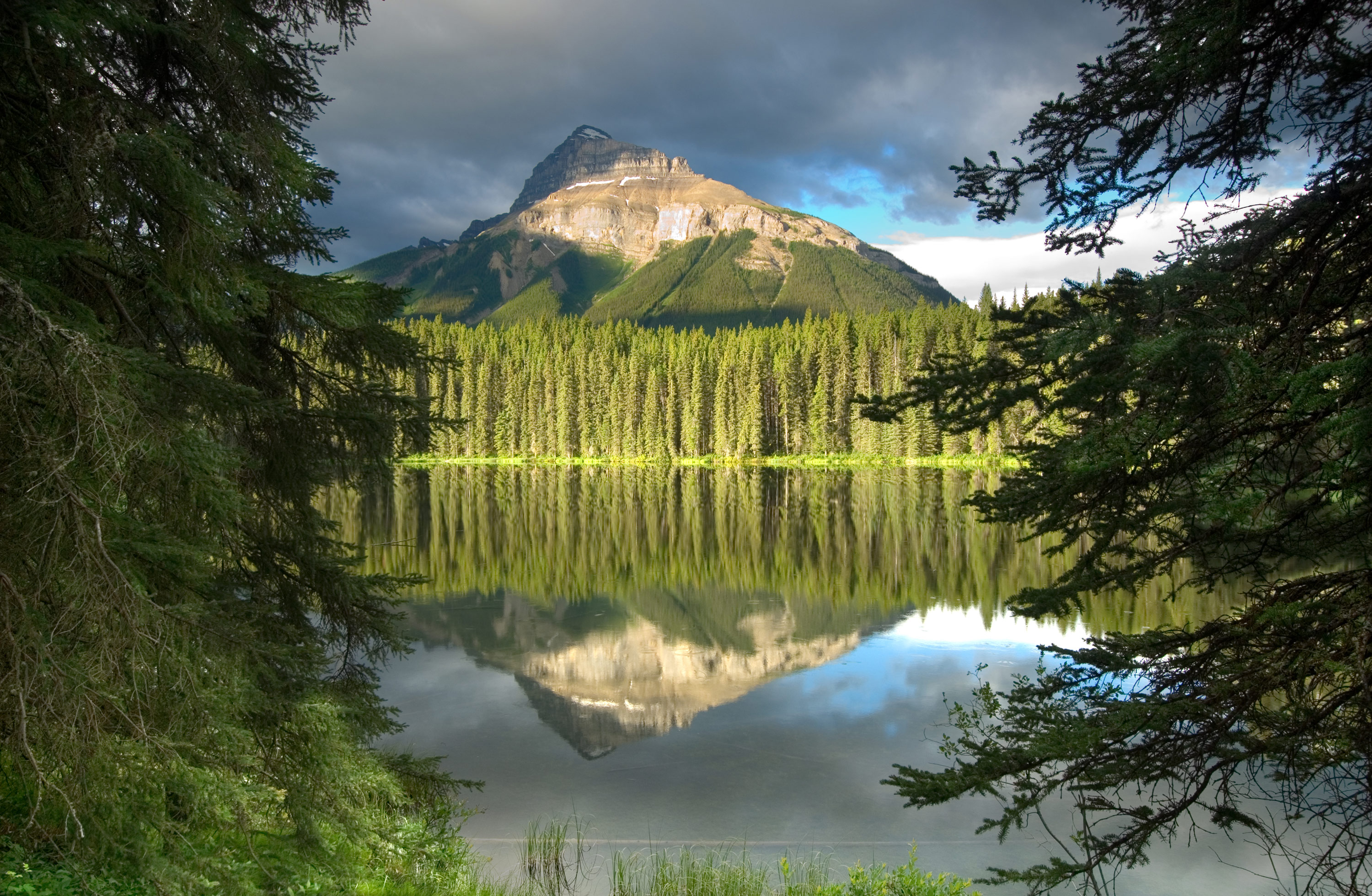
- Pilot Mountain from Pilot Pond

Highest point
- Elevation: 2,935 m (9,629 ft)
- Prominence: 302 m (991 ft)
- Parent peak: Mount Brett (2984 m)
- Listing: Mountains of Alberta
- Coordinates: 51°11′16″N 115°49′30″W

Geography
- Location within Alberta
- Interactive map of Pilot Mountain
- Country: Canada
- Province: Alberta
- Protected area: Banff National Park
- Parent range: Massive Range
- Topo map: NTS 82O4 Banff

Climbing
- First ascent: 1885 by the GSC
- Easiest route: Difficult scramble

Pilot Mountain is a mountain in the Bow River valley of Banff National Park in Alberta, Canada. It is located southeast of Redearth Creek and directly west of the Trans-Canada Highway.

The mountain was named in 1884 by George M. Dawson, for its location is where the Bow Valley changes direction, thus affording distant views of the mountain all along the valley.

Pilot Mountain can be scrambled on the northwest face by someone with good routefinding skills. Nearby Mount Brett (2,984 m (9,790 ft)) can be ascended from a ridge off the western slopes of Pilot Mountain.

== Geology ==
Like other mountains in Banff Park, Pilot Mountain is composed of sedimentary rock laid down from the Precambrian to Jurassic periods. Formed in shallow seas, this sedimentary rock was pushed east and over the top of younger rock during the Laramide orogeny.

== Climate ==
Based on the Köppen climate classification, Pilot Mountain is located in a subarctic climate with cold, snowy winters, and mild summers. Temperatures can drop below -20 °C with wind chill factors below -30 °C.

== Gallery ==
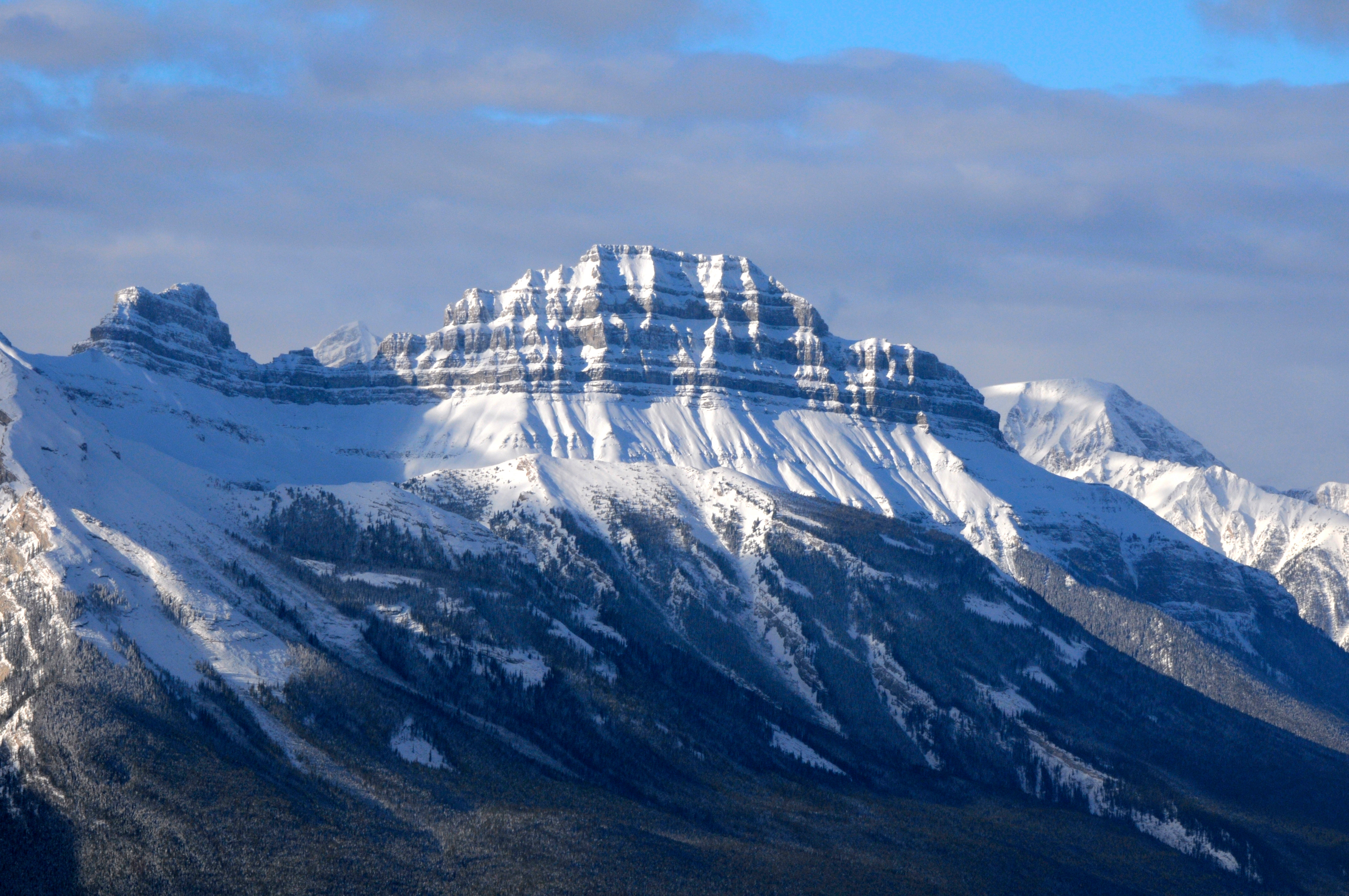
Pilot Mountain seen from Sulphur Mountain
