= Eagle Mountain (Alberta) =

Mountain in Banff NP, Canada

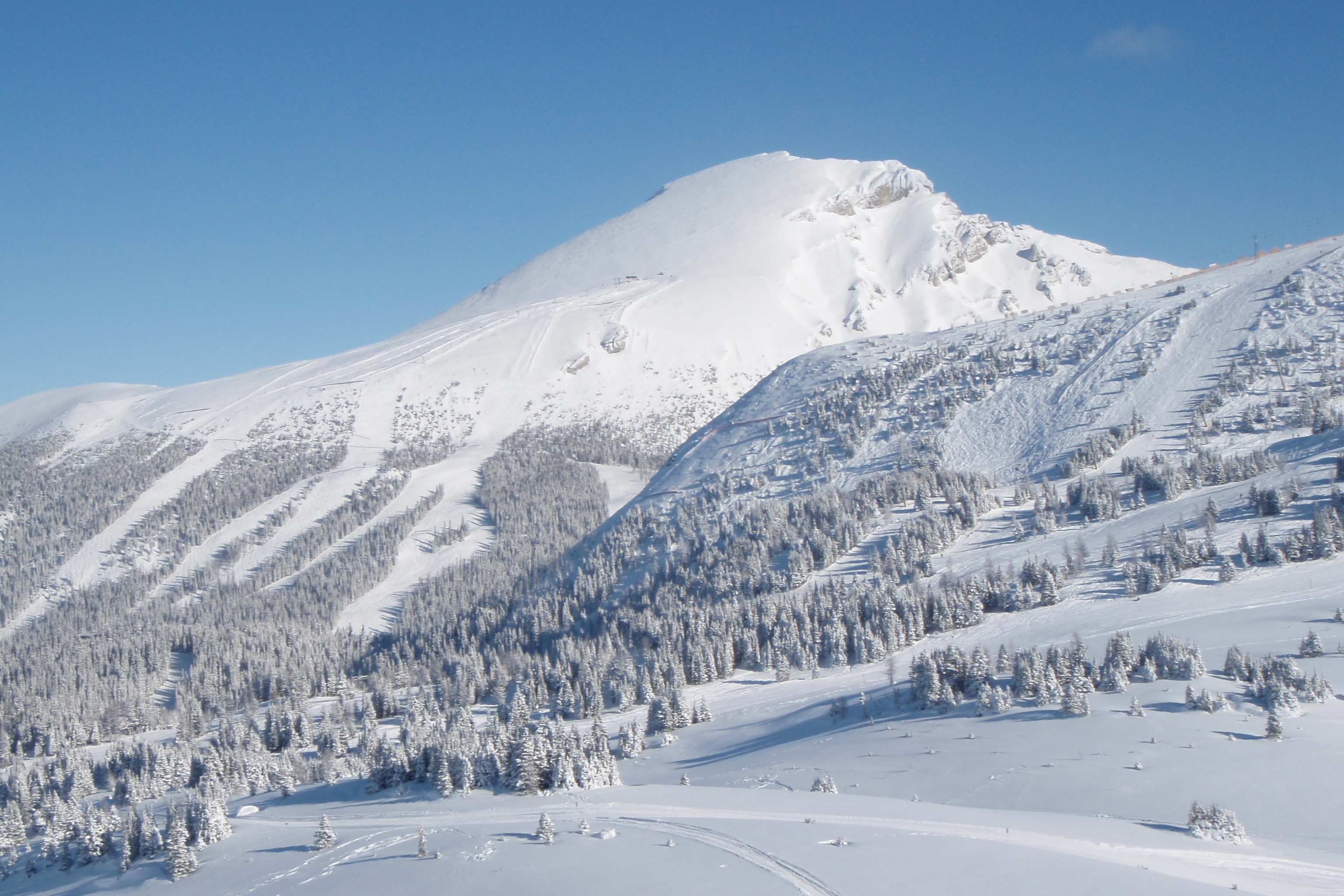
- Eagle Mountain in February 2011

Highest point
- Elevation: 2,836 m (9,304 ft)
- Prominence: 321 m (1,053 ft)
- Listing: Mountains of Alberta
- Coordinates: 51°05′51″N 115°44′41″W

Geography
- Location within Alberta Location within Canada
- Interactive map of Eagle Mountain
- Location: Banff National Park; Alberta, Canada
- Parent range: Canadian Rockies
- Topo map: NTS 82O4 Banff

Climbing
- Easiest route: Hiking

Eagle Mountain is a 2,836-metre (9,304-foot) mountain summit located immediately northeast of the Banff Sunshine ski resort in Banff National Park of Alberta, Canada. The mountain's toponym was officially adopted in 1958 by the Geographical Names Board of Canada. The nearest higher neighbor is Mount Howard Douglas, 1.51 km (0.94 mi) to the south-southeast.

Eagle Mountain contains a natural window officially named Goat's Eye located on the northeast ridge which leads many to call it Goat's Eye Mountain. It was first noted by George Simpson who wrote of it: "a very peculiar feature in an opening of about eighty feet by fifty, which, as we advanced nearer, assumed the appearance of the gateway of a giant's fortress."

== Geology ==
Like other mountains in Banff Park, Eagle Mountain is composed of sedimentary rock laid down from the Precambrian to Jurassic periods. Formed in shallow seas, this sedimentary rock was pushed east and over the top of younger rock during the Laramide orogeny.

== Climate ==
Based on the Köppen climate classification, Eagle Mountain is located in a subarctic climate zone with cold, snowy winters, and mild summers. Winter temperatures can drop below -20 °C with wind chill factors below -30 °C. Precipitation runoff from Eagle Mountain drains into tributaries of the Bow River.

== Gallery ==
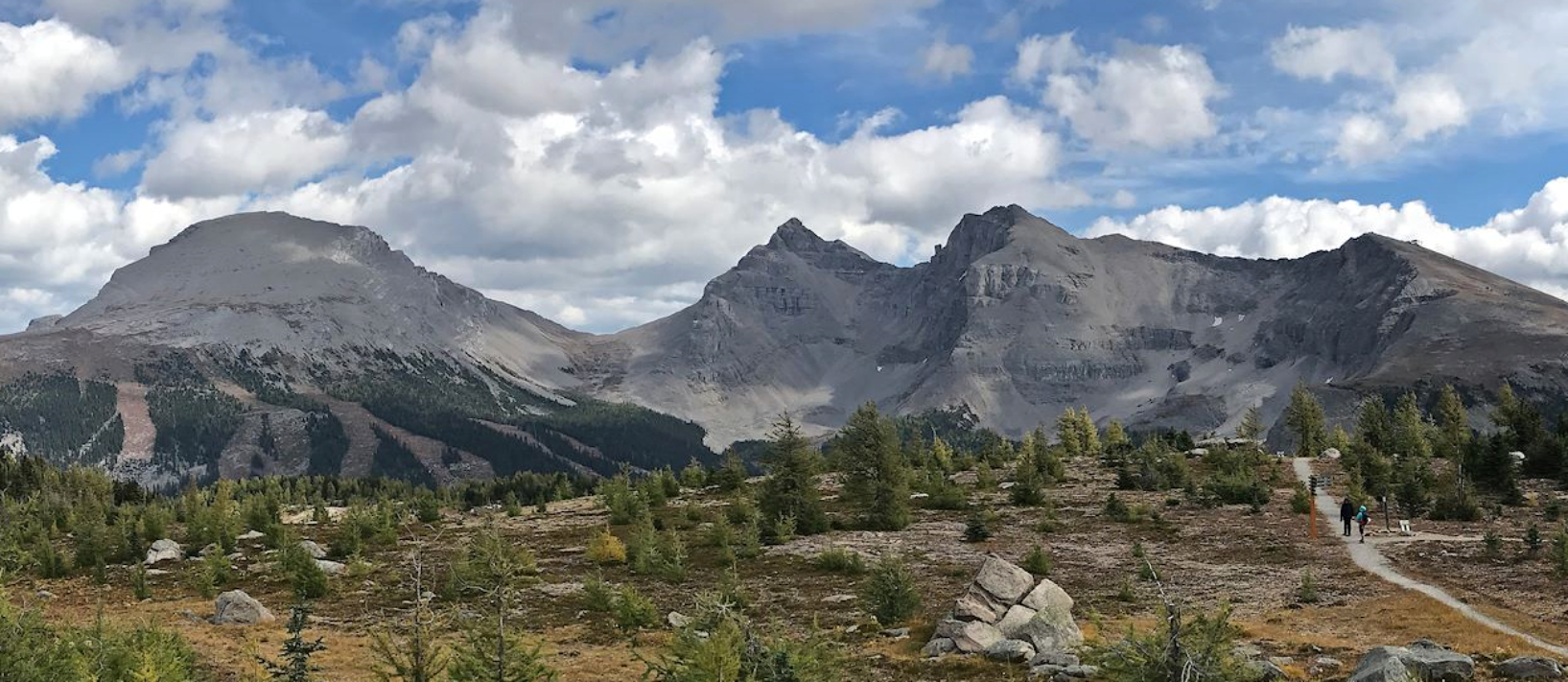
Eagle Mountain (left) and Mount Howard Douglas

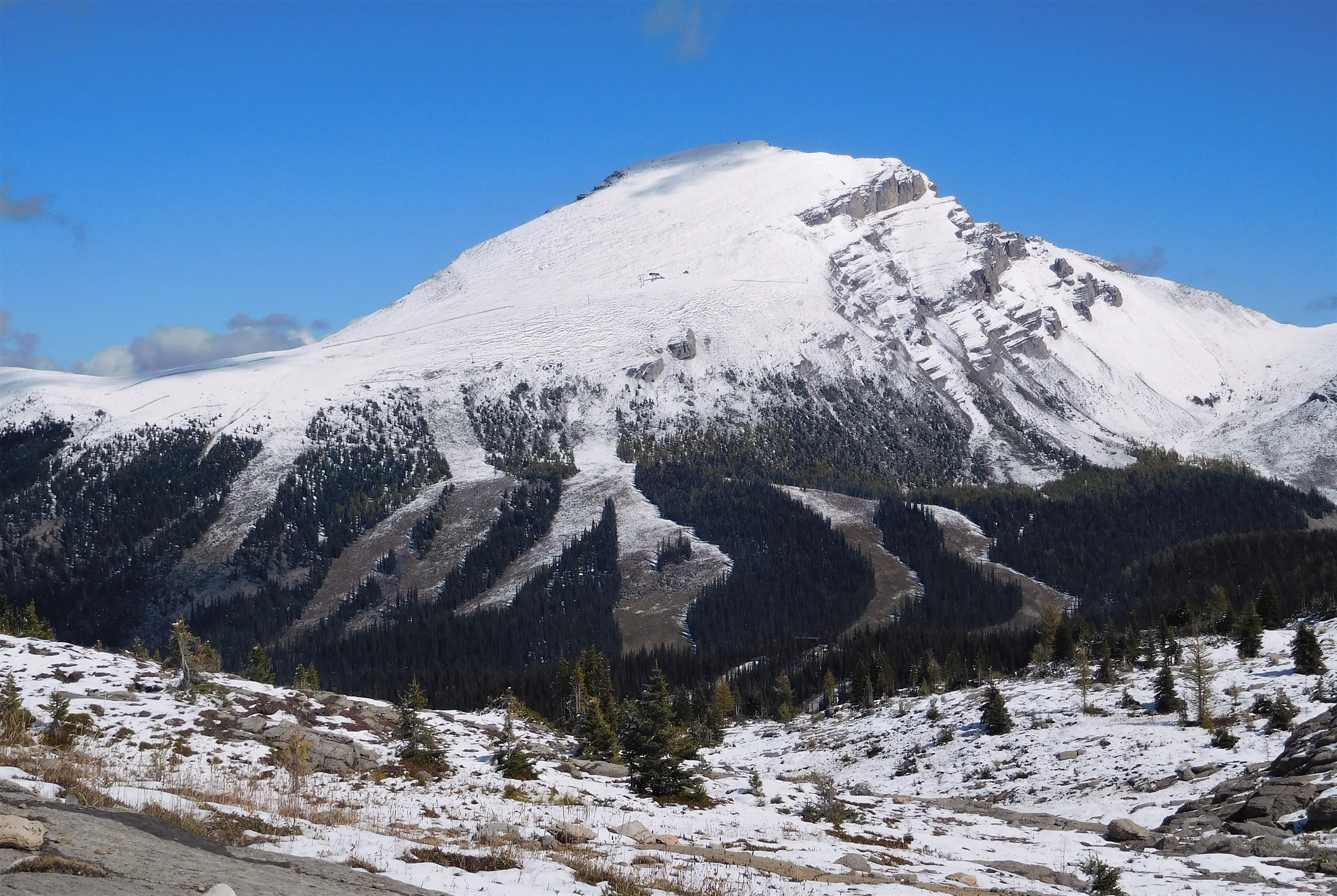
Eagle Mountain from the west

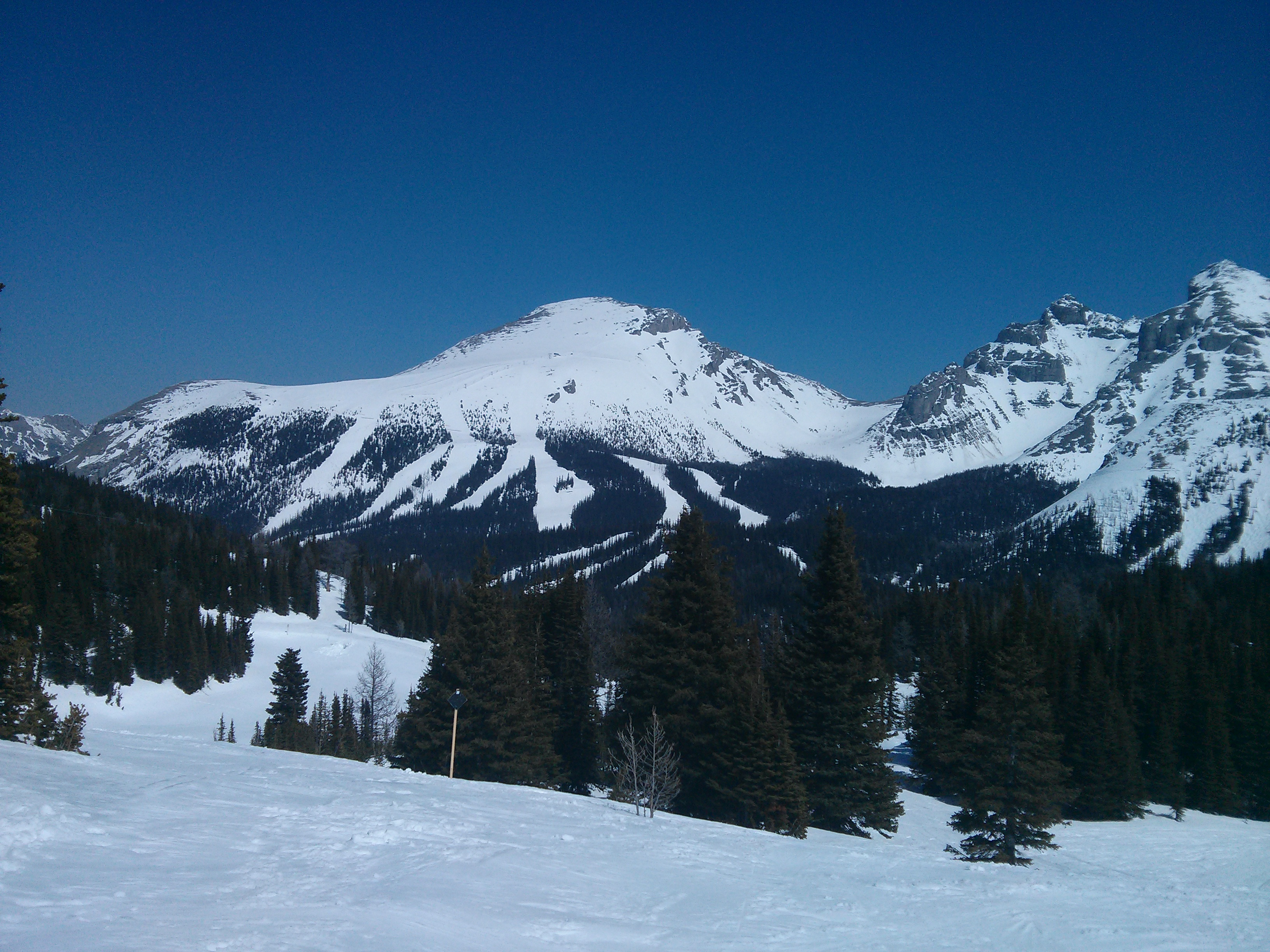
Eagle Mountain (center) and Mount Howard Douglas (right)

== See also ==
- Geography of Alberta
