= Mount Brett =

Mountain in Banff NP, Alberta, Canada

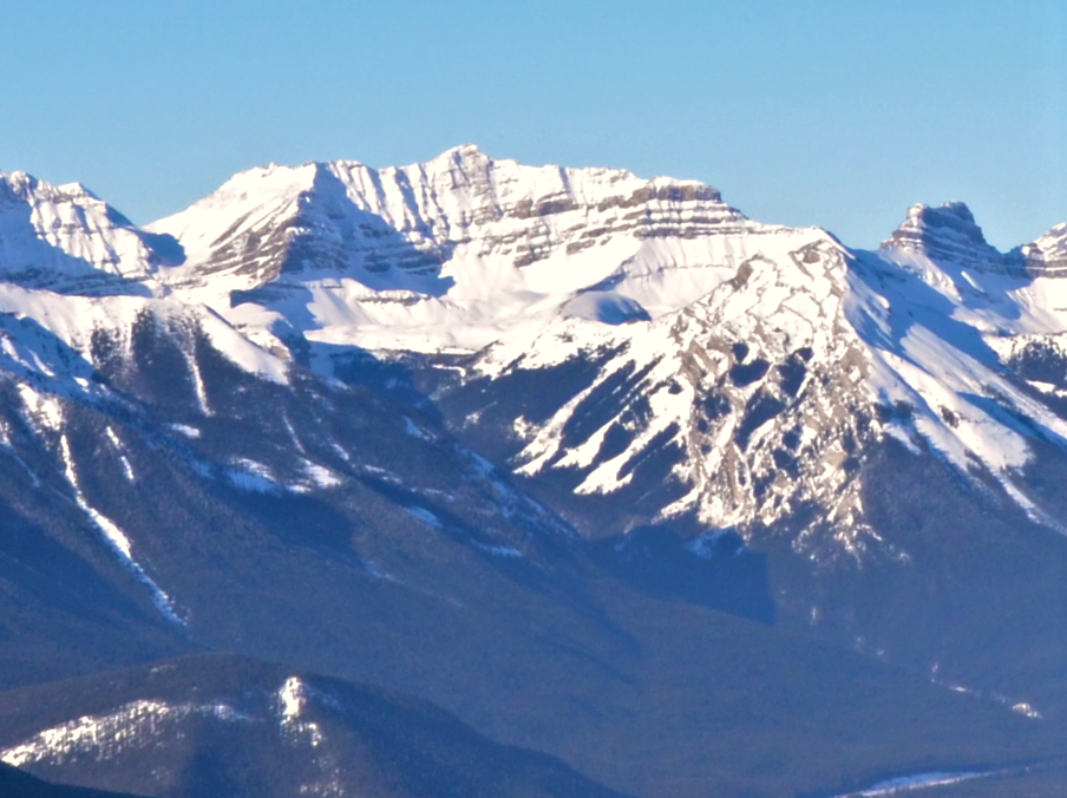
- Mount Brett seen from Sulphur Mountain

Highest point
- Elevation: 2,984 m (9,790 ft)
- Prominence: 899 m (2,949 ft)
- Parent peak: Mount Ball
- Listing: Mountains of Alberta
- Coordinates: 51°09′42″N 115°49′18″W

Geography
- Location within Alberta
- Country: Canada
- Province: Alberta
- Protected area: Banff National Park
- Parent range: Massive Range
- Topo map: NTS 82O4 Banff

Climbing
- First ascent: 1916 Hogeboom, Bent, James Outram, Ritchie, McClelland
- Easiest route: Scrambling routes from Pilot Mountain

Mount Brett is a 2,984-metre (9,790-foot) summit located in the Massive Range of Alberta, Canada It is situated in Banff National Park, 20 km (12 mi) west of Banff townsite, in the Canadian Rockies. Its nearest higher peak is Mount Ball, 12.52 km (7.78 mi) to the west.

== History ==
Mount Brett was named in 1916 for Robert Brett (1851–1929). Doctor Brett was a surgeon who first came to Banff in 1885. He later served as the second Lieutenant Governor of Alberta starting in 1915.

The first ascent of Mount Brett was made in 1916 by C.F. Hogeboom, A.H. Bent, James Outram, E.G. Ritchie, and K.D. McClelland.

The mountain's name became official on November 2, 1956 when approved by the Geographical Names Board of Canada.

== Geology ==
Like other mountains in Banff Park, Mount Brett is composed of sedimentary rock laid down during the Precambrian to Jurassic periods. Formed in shallow seas, this sedimentary rock was pushed east and over the top of younger rock during the Laramide orogeny.

== Climate ==
Based on the Köppen climate classification, Mount Brett is located in a subarctic climate with cold, snowy winters, and mild summers. Temperatures can drop below −20 C with wind chill factors below −30 C. Precipitation runoff from Mount Brett drains into tributaries of the Bow River, which is a tributary of the Saskatchewan River.

== See also ==
- List of mountains of Canada
