= Ralph D. Scurfield =

Canadian businessman

Ralph D. Scurfield (born March 1956) is the CEO, President, and majority shareholder of Sunshine Village Corporation.

The oldest of seven children of Ralph T. and Sonia Scurfield. Ralph and his brothers and sisters grew up in Calgary, Alberta. He is best known as the owner and operator of Banff's Sunshine Village Ski & Snowboard Resort. He is also a director of Jasper's Marmot Basin; in which Sunshine Village has a major shareholding.

Scurfield holds a B.A. from University of Alberta, a J.D. from Gonzaga University, a Certificate in Tourism Management from Simon Fraser University and a Certificate in Management Studies from the University of Oxford Advanced Management Program. He is a member of the Law Society of Alberta and State Bar of California. He is a member of WPO/YPO

Scurfield has considerable experience in the areas of tourism, finance and independent business. He was a finalist in the 1996 Prairie Region Entrepreneur of the Year Award. Scurfield has served on private sector boards in the hotel, oil and gas, and financial services industries, as well as on tourism associations. He served on the Canadian Forces Liaison Council (Alberta) from 2002–08 and was awarded the Alberta Centennial Medal in 2005.

He served as a Director of ATB Financial for seven years and was vice-chair of the Audit committee as the "bank" transformed from an agency of the Alberta government to a Crown Corporation. He also served on the Governance Committee and H.R. Committee of the ATB Financial Board.

He has worked extensively since 1981, with the Canadian federal government and Parks Canada to improve both world-famous ski resorts; Sunshine Village in Banff National Park and Marmot Basin in Jasper National Park. In October 1994, Scurfield addressed the Canadian Senate Committee on Energy, The Environment and Natural Resources.

Scurfield has, on several occasions, shown his support to help raise funds to protect North American waterways through Robert F. Kennedy, Jr.’s Waterkeeper Alliance, and he is also a long time supporter of the Dave Irwin Foundation for Brain Injury Recovery in support of his long-time friend Dave Irwin.
