= Mount Bourgeau =

Mountain in Banff NP, Alberta, Canada

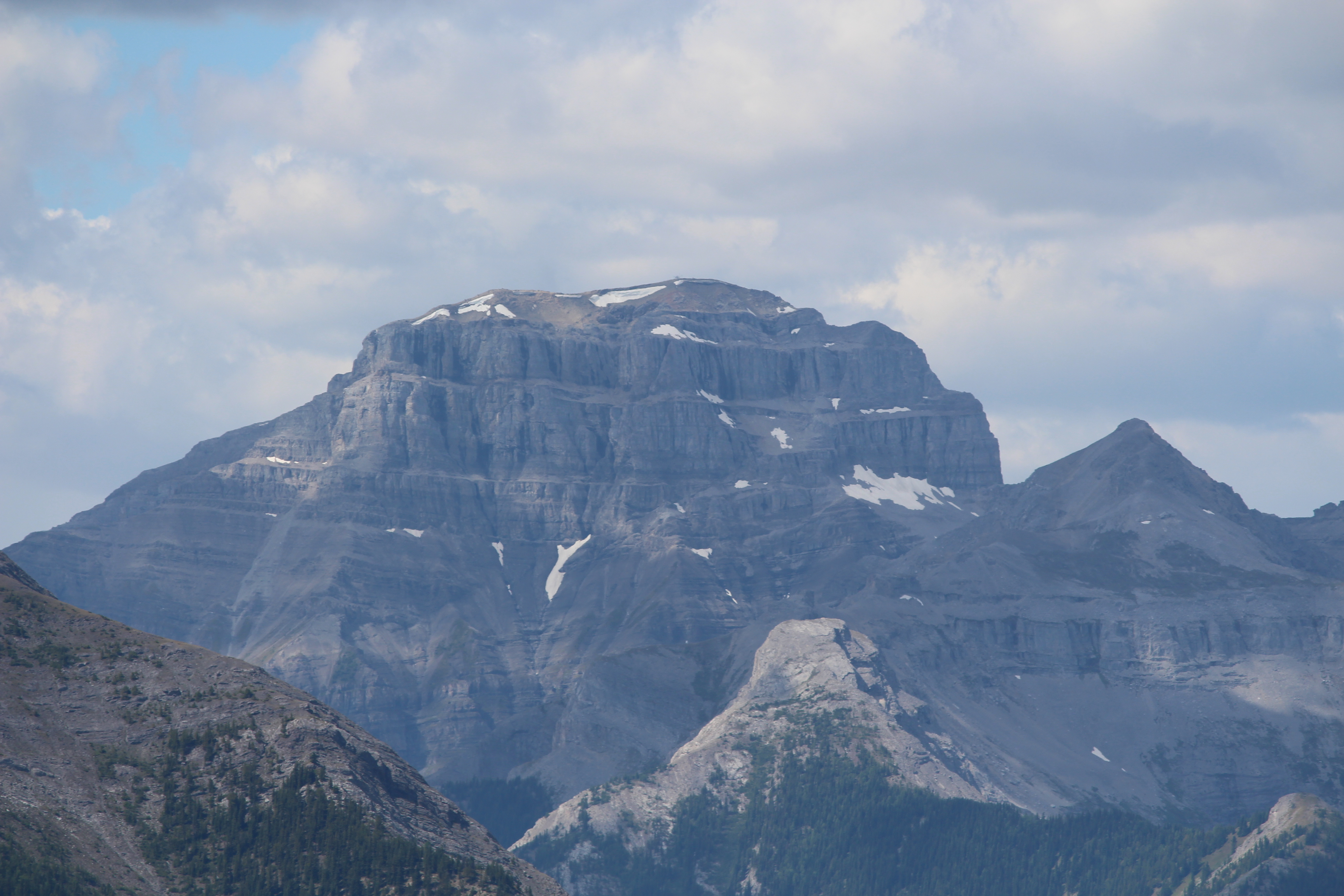
- Mount Bourgeau seen from Sulphur Mountain

Highest point
- Elevation: 2,931 m (9,616 ft)
- Prominence: 462 m (1,516 ft)
- Listing: Mountains of Alberta
- Coordinates: 51°07′55″N 115°46′31″W

Geography
- Location within Alberta Location within Canada
- Location: Alberta, Canada
- Parent range: Massive Range; Canadian Rockies
- Topo map: NTS 82O4 Banff

Climbing
- First ascent: 1890 by J.J. McArthur, Tom Wilson
- Easiest route: Easy scramble on western slopes

Mount Bourgeau is a 2,931-metre (9,616 ft) mountain located in the Massive Range of Banff National Park in Alberta, Canada. It was named by James Hector in 1860 after Eugène Bourgeau, a botanist with the Palliser Expedition. Bourgeau Lake sits at the foot of the mountain and is a popular hiking destination.

== Geology ==
Like other mountains in Banff Park, Mount Bourgeau is composed of sedimentary rock laid down from the Precambrian to Jurassic periods. Formed in shallow seas, this sedimentary rock was pushed east and over the top of younger rock during the Laramide orogeny.

== Climate ==
Based on the Köppen climate classification, Mount Bourgeau is located in a subarctic climate with cold, snowy winters, and mild summers. Temperatures can drop below -20 °C with wind chill factors below -30 °C.

== Gallery ==
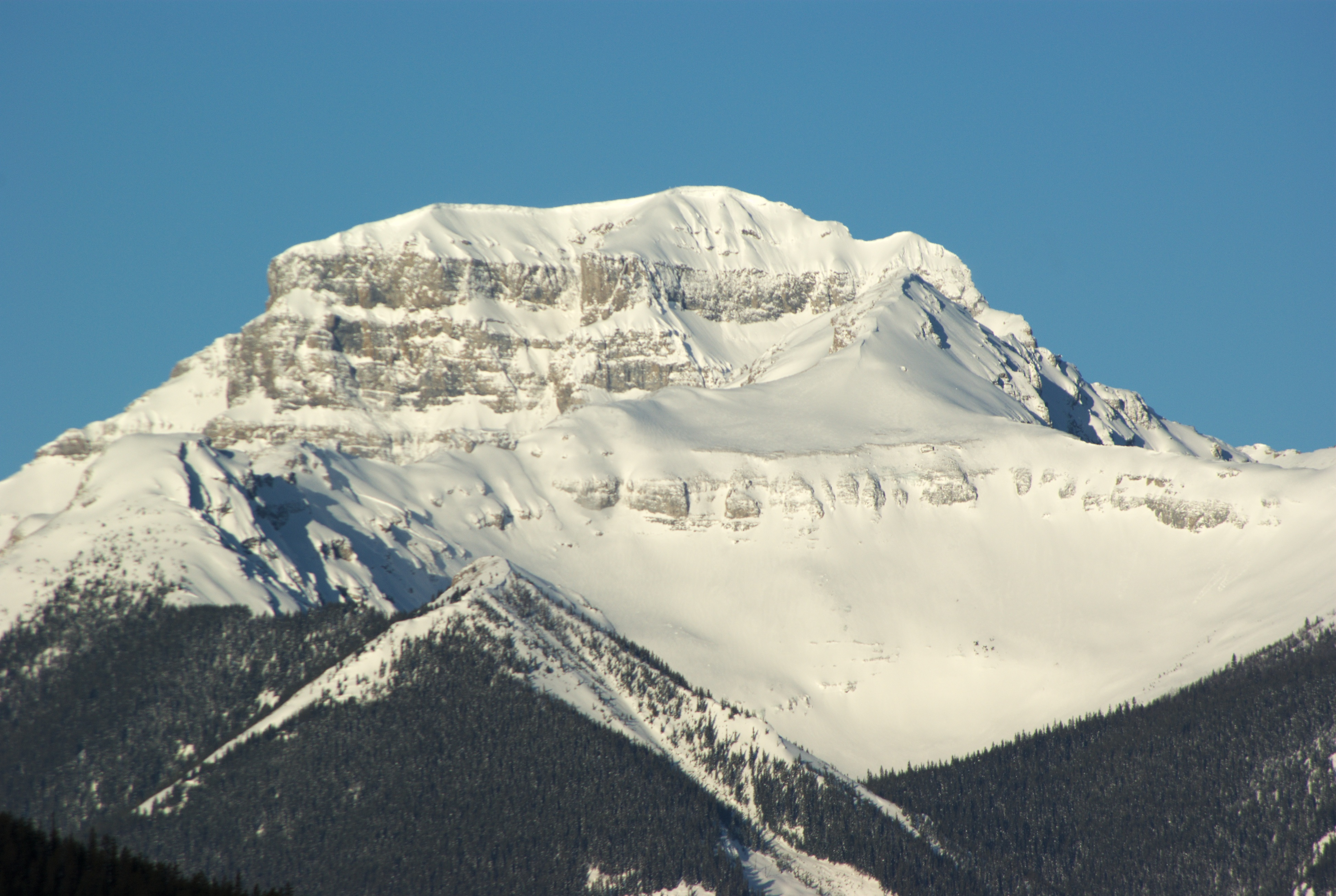
Mount Bourgeau
