= Banff Sunshine =

Ski resort in Alberta, Canada

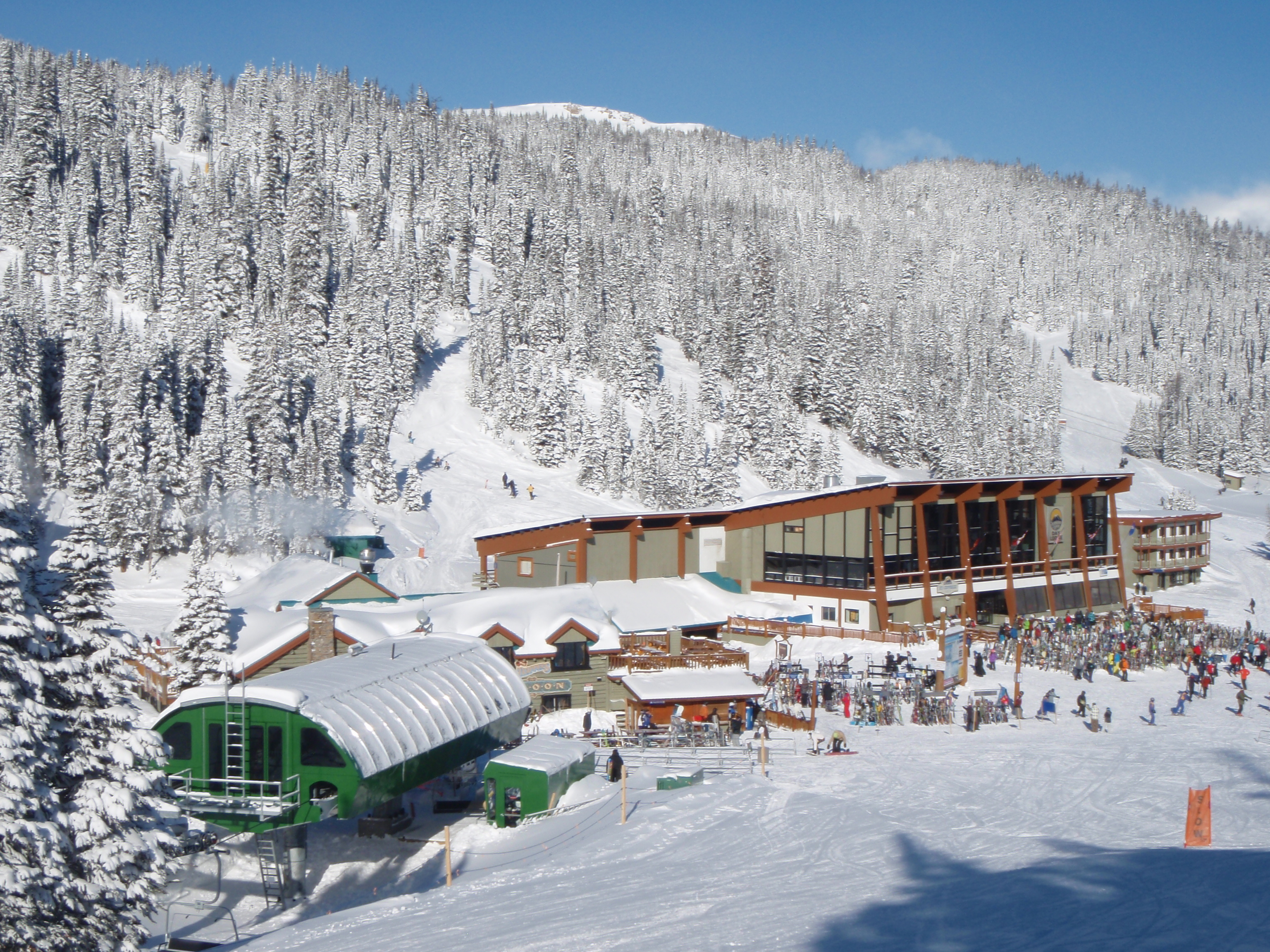
- Banff Sunshine Village ski resort

- Location within Alberta Location within Canada
- Location: Banff National Park, Alberta, Canada
- Nearest city: Banff – 15 km (9 mi)
- Coordinates: 51°04′43″N 115°46′56″W
- Vertical: 1,070 m (3,510 ft)
- Top elevation: 2,730 m (8,957 ft)
- Base elevation: 1,660 m (5,446 ft)
- Skiable area: 13.6 km^{2} (3,360.6 acres)
- Trails: 137; 15% easiest 37% more difficult 40% most difficult 7% Expert
- Lift system: 1 Gondola (8); 6 High-Speed Quads; 1 High-Speed Six-pack; 2 Quads; 2 Magic Carpets
- Lift capacity: 20,000 / h
- Terrain parks: 5
- Snowfall: 914 cm (360 in; 30 ft)
- Night skiing: no
- Website: SkiBanff.com

Banff Sunshine Village (also known as Sunshine Village and Sunshine) is a ski resort in western Canada, located on the Continental Divide of the Canadian Rockies within Banff National Park in Alberta and Mount Assiniboine Provincial Park in British Columbia. It is one of three major ski resorts located in the Banff National Park. Because of its location straddling the Continental Divide of the Americas, Sunshine receives more snow than the neighbouring ski resorts. The Sunshine base area is located 15 km (9 mi) southwest of the town of Banff. By car, it is 140 km (87 mi) from the city of Calgary; the Sunshine exit on the Trans Canada Highway is 8 km (5 mi) west of the town of Banff.

Banff Sunshine ski runs and lifts are accessed via an eight-person high-speed gondola. It moves passengers from the parking lot (or bus terminal) to Goat's Eye mountain in 10 minutes and to the upper Village area in 18 minutes. There are 9 chairlifts and 134 trails within the alpine valley formed by the three mountains (Mount Standish, Lookout Mountain, and Goat's Eye Mountain) that constitute Banff Sunshine. In summer, the resort runs the gondola service to its walking trails and alpine meadows.

== History ==
The first explorer that passed through the Sunshine area was Governor George Simpson of Hudson's Bay Company. His party passed through the area in 1841, en route to Fort Vancouver, while searching for a new quicker route into the Columbia District/Oregon Country. His diary noted "Hole in the Wall" Goat's Eye mountain and he left a blaze on a tree at the top of Simpson Pass that has since been preserved in the Banff Park Museum. The next significant exploration party was the Palliser Expedition in the late 1850s; Mt. Borgeau, is named for one of its members.

Everything changed with the building of the Canadian Pacific Railway and its arrival in Banff in the late 1880s. Bill Peyto may have been the first person to bring real tourists through the Sunshine area. Peyto was a trapper, prospector, and a competent guide. In the 1890s Peyto would guide tourists through the Sunshine Meadows to the base of Mt. Assiniboine, the highest peak in the Southern Continental Ranges of the Canadian Rockies.

By the 1920s, Sunshine Meadows had become a popular camping site. Pat Brewster, the youngest son of dairyman John Brewster, was the first to regularly bring tourists for overnight camping at Sunshine Meadows. This area was nicknamed Tee Pee Town on account of the many tents that overnight campers would set there.

In 1928, the Canadian Pacific Railway built a log cabin lodge for the use of The Trail Riders of the Canadian Rockies, a club of horse enthusiasts who were sponsored by the tourist-friendly railway. This cabin was certainly not the first lodge built in the region (Bill Peyto's cabin near Simpson's pass was built more than 30 years earlier), but it is now the oldest building at Banff Sunshine and is known as the Old Sunshine Lodge. Housing Mad Trapper's Saloon and Bruno's Bistro, the OSL is situated at the timberline above what was then known as Wheeler's Flats and just below a vast expanse of high alpine meadows.

In March 1929, Cliff White and Cyril Paris, two local extreme sports enthusiasts, created a plan to use the CPR cabin as an overnight point in their ski trek over the great divide. Unfortunately they could not find the cabin that night and were forced to sleep in a dug-out in the snow. Upon waking in the morning they discovered that they had only just missed the CPR cabin. These two men were the first to ski what is now known as Banff Sunshine.

In 1934 Jim and Pat Brewster leased the cabin from the CPR and began offering ski vacations. They bought the lodge in 1936. In 1939 they hired Swiss guide Bruno Engler as the first ski instructor. In 1941 a rope tow was built. The Brewster's owned the area until 1951 when it was sold to George Encil, who also owned nearby Mt. Norquay. He added "Village" to the name and made numerous improvements including the addition of a "Ski-Kuli" lift.

In 1961 the resort was purchased by local Banff businessman Cliff White, Jr. and his wife Bev. Their vision has shaped the resort. Partnering with Power Corporation Resorts, they built the Sunshine Inn (now Sunshine Mountain Lodge), the Daylodge and opened up the slopes of the Continental (Great) Divide Chairlift. He ushered in the modern era with the opening of the first gondola, which replaced bus access to the ski area, in 1980.

In 1981, the resort was purchased by Ralph T. Scurfield of Calgary. Since his death in 1985, his eldest son Ralph along with two brothers, Sergei and John, ran the resort and made many improvements. In 1988, the resort's first high-speed quad opened with the construction of the Angel Express on Lookout Mountain. In 1995, the resort expanded onto Goat's Eye Mountain, constructing a Poma high-speed quad to service the new terrain. A year later, the Great Divide double chairlift to the summit of Lookout Mountain was replaced with an extended high-speed quad, also built by Poma. In 2000, Poma replaced the two chairlifts on the mountain between Goat's Eye and Lookout Mountains. The Wheeler double chairlift was replaced with a high-speed quad, the Wolverine Express, and the Fireweed T-Bar was replaced with a fixed-grip quad, Jackrabbit.

In 1985 the resort hosted women's legs of the FIS Alpine Ski World Cup with two downhills, a Super-G and downhill leg of the Alpine Combined.

In 1991 the resort hosted Downhill and super -G events for the 1991 Winter Deaflympics.

In 2001, the aging gondola that had brought guests up to the mountain since 1980 was replaced with a modern gondola built by Poma, reusing the same line and many of the original towers. At the same time, the WaWa T-Bar was removed and a fixed-grip quad was built by Poma to replace it. In 2003, the Standish double chairlift was upgraded by Leitner Poma to a high=speed quad, providing high-speed lift service to Mount Standish.

In 2010, the Strawberry triple chairlift was removed and replaced with a slightly used Doppelmayr CTEC high-speed quad. The Strawberry Express had originally been built with VANOC as a temporary lift at Whistler Blackcomb in 2009 for the 2010 Winter Olympics to transport spectators from the Creekside base area to the finish line on the downhill course. In 2015, the last remaining double chairlift on the mountain, Tee Pee Town, was removed and replaced by Doppelmayr with a bubble high-speed quad containing heated seats.

Banff Sunshine now hosts well over 500,000 skiers and snowboarders annually over a ski season that stretches from early November to late May.

In 2019, Parks Canada and the resort reached an agreement over future expansion and leasehold area. The resort and Parks Canada agreed to a 42-year lease with an agreement to then give Sunshine Village Ski Resort to the Crown for $1, or sever and remove every facility and return the land to its natural state.

== Amenities ==
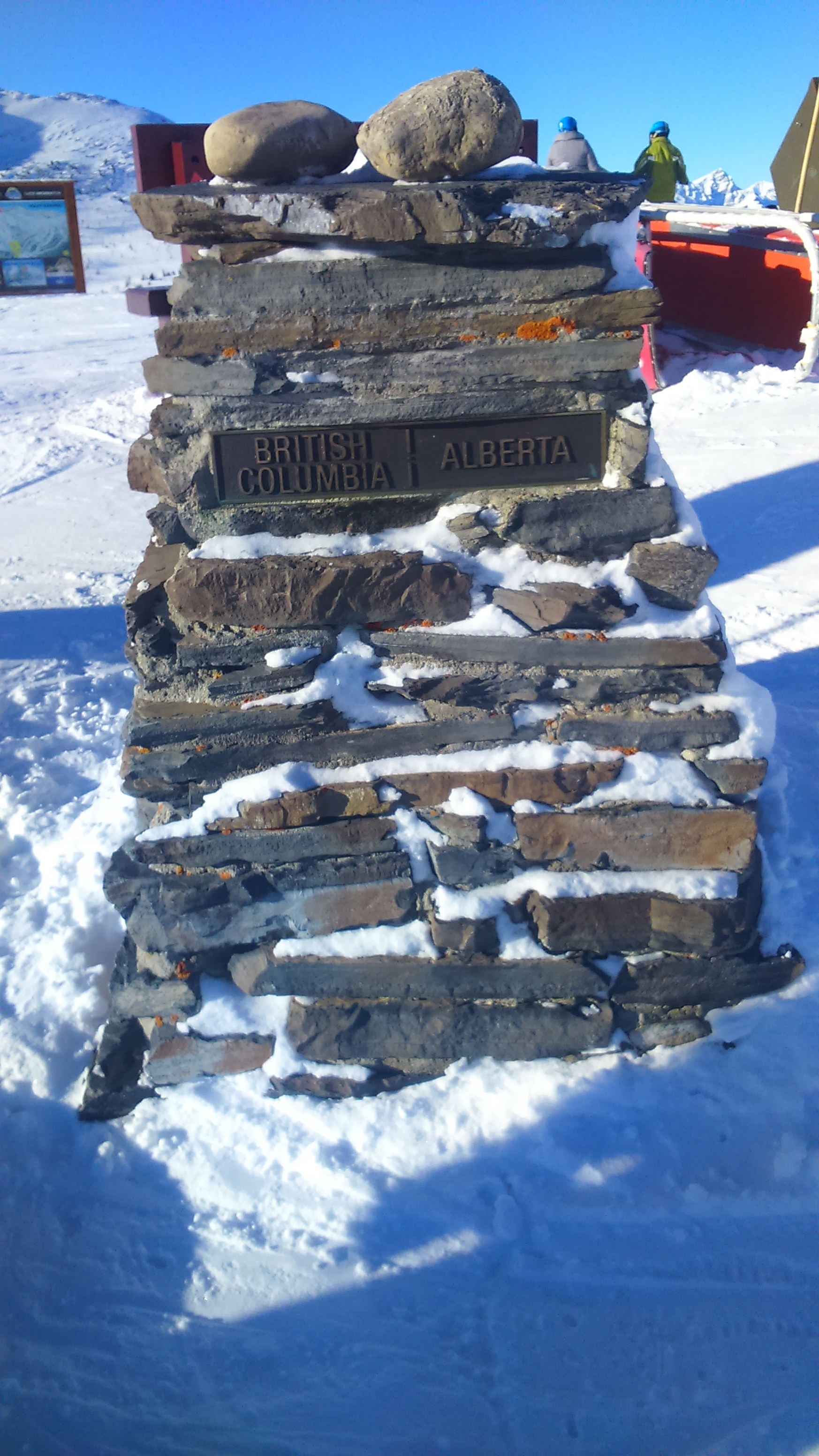
Great Divide monument between British Columbia and Alberta at the top of Standish chair

Banff Sunshine has 3,358 acres (13.59 km^{2}) of skiable terrain in Alberta and B.C. Its top elevation is at 2,730 m (8,960 ft), its base elevation is at 1,660 m (5,450 ft), and it is 1,070 m (3,510 ft) tall. The primary skiing area around Banff Sunshine is based at 2,160 m (7,090 ft), providing 570 m (1,870 ft) of vertical terrain to the top of Lookout Mountain. There are 134 named runs spreading out over three mountains (Goat Eye's Mountain, Lookout Mountain and Mount Standish) and the two provinces, (Alberta and British Columbia). Lift service includes a gondola, several chairlifts, a high-speed quad with heated seats and bubbles and magic carpet lifts. Banff Sunshine is the first ski resort in Canada to feature a high-speed quad with heated seats and bubbles. This chair was constructed in 2015 and is known as Teepee Town XL. The annual snowfall is up to thirty feet (over nine metres).

The Sunshine Mountain Lodge, an 84-room hotel is located in the "village" at tree line 7,200 feet (2,200 m) above sea level. It is the only ski-in/ski-out lodge in Banff-Lake Louise. Guests can purchase a Marmot Card to receive discounts on lift tickets. This card allows guests to ski at a discounted rate at both Banff Sunshine and Marmot Basin in Jasper and includes a number of free ski days.

Due to its location in Banff National Park and the development restrictions that apply, parking at Banff Sunshine has long been in limited supply. When the main parking lot fills, visitors park along the access road and use a shuttle bus to get to the base lodge. This has been a source of friction with Parks Canada over the years, due to Parks Canada's concern about avalanche risks along the road. In 2017, a court overturned a Parks Canada imposed ban on access road parking. In the summer of 2021, the parking lot was expanded and 250 new spots were added.

=== Terrain ===
Banff Sunshine offers terrain for all levels of skiers and boarders. It offers a mix of gentle tree-lined beginner slopes, wide open above tree-line intermediate and expert terrain. Visitors to the resort may access one of the eight adjacent backcountry terrain such as 'Wawa Ridge' or Mount Assiniboine Provincial Park in British Columbia. Avalanche rescue equipment is recommended for most backcountry areas. Rescue equipment is requiremed for access to the freeride zones of Delirium Dive and Wild West where the entrances are via a gate that remains locked at all times unless it detects a working avalanche transceiver on each person that passes through it. The entrance for Wild West is located on Goats Eye Mountain while the entrance to Delirium Dive is located near the Great Divide. Sunshine features a 5 km ski-out which brings guests from the village to the gondola base.

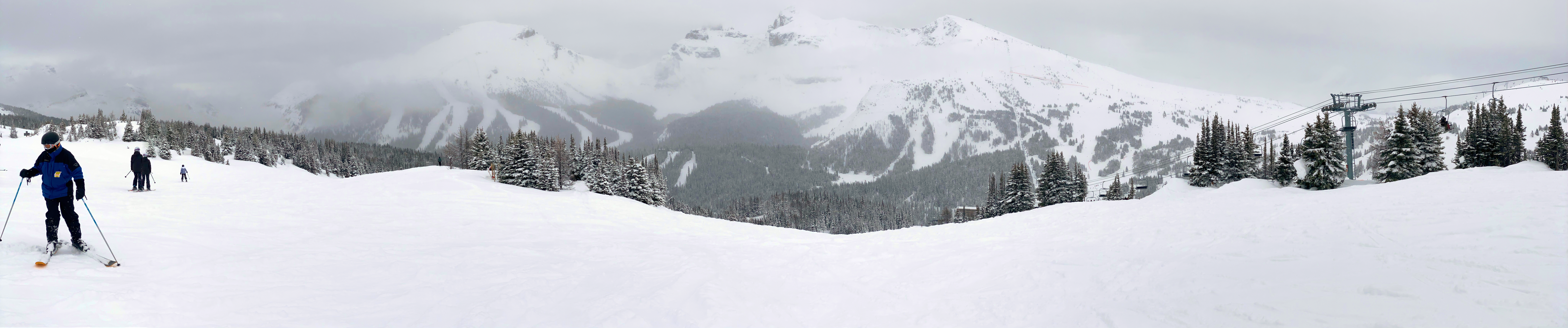
Banff Sunshine, 2020

=== Lift system ===
Banff Sunshine 10 has chairlifts, and 2 magic carpets.

Name	Type	Builder	Built	Vertical (Metres)	Length (Metres)	Notes
Gondola	Gondola 8	Leitner-Poma	2001	500	4300	Has 2 mid-stations, and reuses towers from the original gondola.
Tee Pee Town LX	High-Speed Quad	Doppelmayr	2015	391	1200	Has orange bubbles, with heated seats.
Strawberry Express	High-Speed Quad	Doppelmayr CTEC	2010	178	817	Originally installed at Whistler Blackcomb as the Timing Flats Express for spectator access during the 2010 Winter Olympics.
Mount Standish Express	High-Speed Quad	Leitner-Poma	2003	217	865	Crosses from Alberta and terminates in British Columbia
Wolverine Express	High-Speed Quad	Poma	2000	194	1216	
Great Divide Express	High-Speed Quad	Poma	1996	422	1740	Crosses from Alberta into British Columbia near the summit.
Goat's Eye Express	High-Speed Quad	Poma	1995	580	1557	
Super Angel	High speed six pack	Leitner-Poma	2024	379	1588	Bubble six pack with heated seats
Wawa	Fixed Grip Quad	Leitner-Poma	2002	170	741	Fixed grip quad with loading carpet
Jackrabbit	Fixed Grip Quad	Poma	2000	84	312	

== Popular culture ==
Many movies and TV specials have been filmed in the Sunshine area. Banff Sunshine was utilized as a task destination for the season-ending episode of the popular American reality television show The Amazing Race 5 (original broadcast date September 2004). In the final 13th leg of this race, the three remaining teams took taxicabs from the Calgary International Airport to Banff Sunshine. After riding the gondola to the base of Lookout Mountain, the contestants donned snowshoes before making the approximate 2,000 vertical foot hike to the top ridge of the Great Divide (elevation 8,900 feet). Sunshine regularly host the Marjoe Gortner Celebrity Sports Invitational charity ski events to raise money for charities such as the Dream Foundation and Robert F. Kennedy, Jr.'s Waterkeeper Alliance.
