= Old Baldy (Fisher Range) =

Mountain in Alberta, Canada

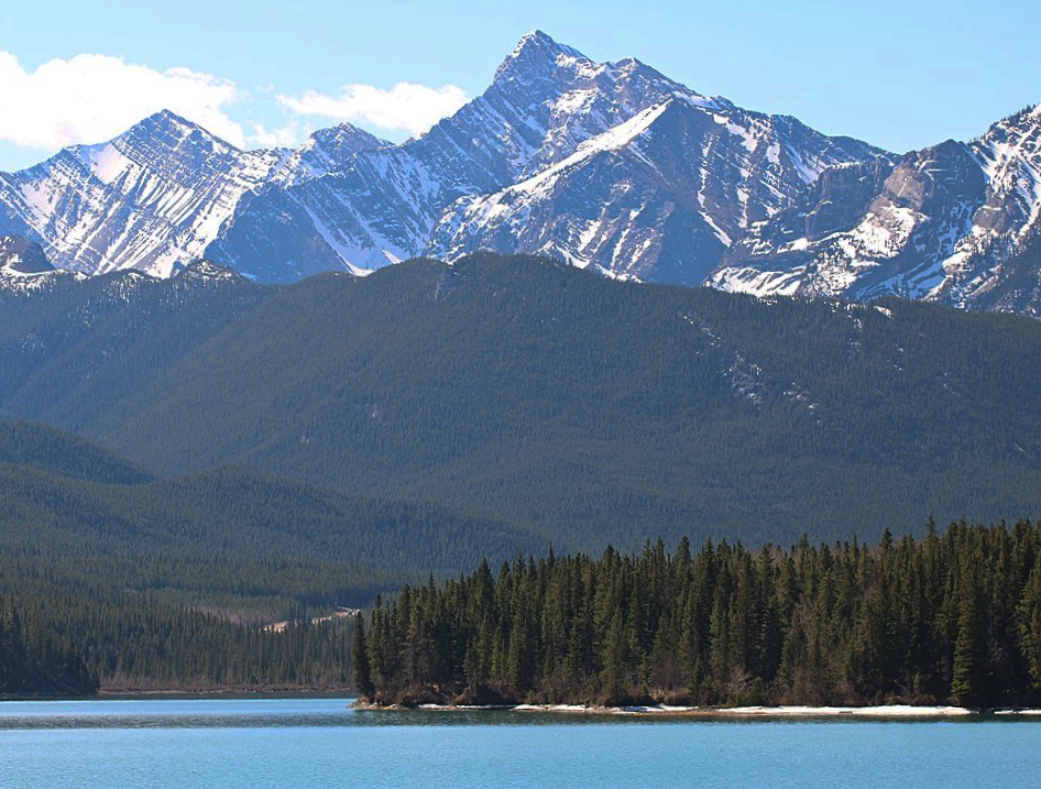
- Old Baldy seen from Barrier Lake

Highest point
- Elevation: 2,726 m (8,944 ft)
- Prominence: 226 m (741 ft)
- Parent peak: Mount Kidd (3053 m)
- Listing: Mountains of Alberta
- Coordinates: 50°54′41″N 115°04′13″W

Geography
- Location within Alberta Location within Canada
- Location: Alberta, Canada
- Parent range: Fisher Range; Canadian Rockies
- Topo map: NTS 82J14 Spray Lakes Reservoir

Geology
- Rock age: Cambrian
- Rock type: sedimentary rock

Climbing
- Easiest route: Scramble

Old Baldy is a 2,726-metre (8,944-foot) mountain summit located in the Fisher Range of Kananaskis Country in the Canadian Rockies of Alberta, Canada. Old Baldy's nearest higher peak is Mount Kidd, 4.0 km (2.5 mi) to the west-southwest. Mount McDougall, also 2726 metres like Old Baldy, lies 2.0 km (1.2 mi) to the southeast of Old Baldy.

== Geology ==
Old Baldy is composed of sedimentary rock laid down during the Precambrian to Jurassic periods. Formed in shallow seas, this sedimentary rock was pushed east and over the top of younger rock during the Laramide orogeny.

== Climate ==
Based on the Köppen climate classification, Old Baldy is located in a subarctic climate with cold, snowy winters, and mild summers. Temperatures can drop below −20 °C with wind chill factors below −30 °C. In terms of favorable weather, June through September are the best months to climb. Precipitation runoff from the mountain drains into tributaries of the Kananaskis River.

== Gallery ==
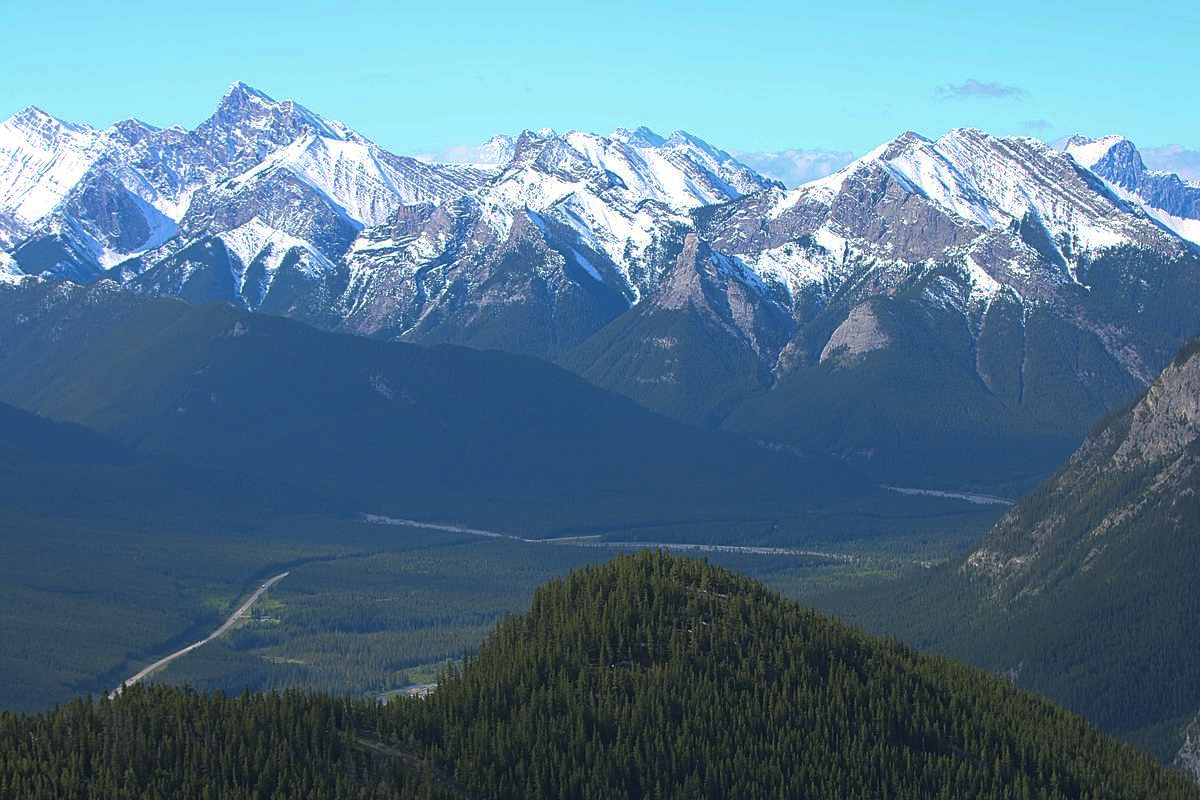
Old Baldy (left), Kananaskis Peak (center), and Wasootch Peak (right) seen from Yates Mountain

== See also ==
- List of mountains in the Canadian Rockies
- Geology of Alberta
