= Wasootch Peak =

Mountain in the country of Canada

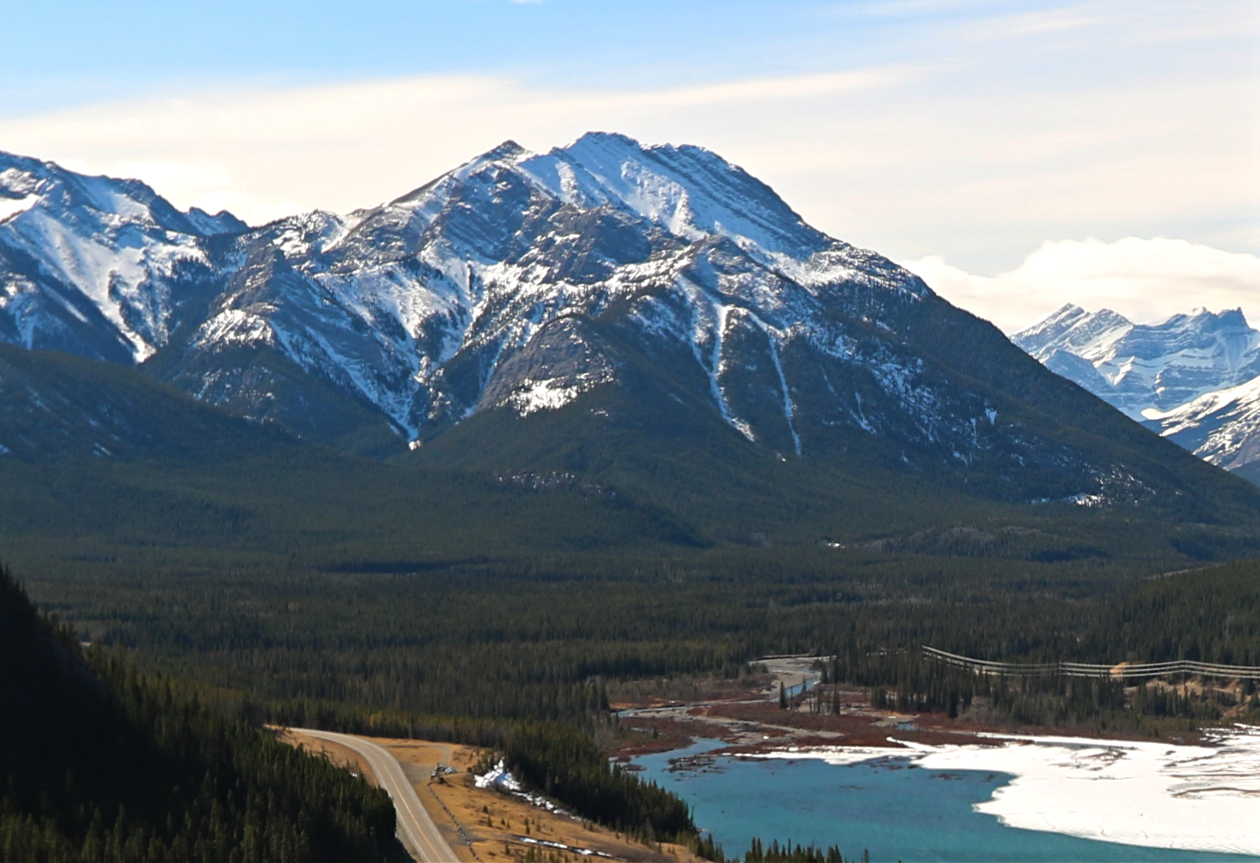
- Wasootch Peak seen from the north

Highest point
- Elevation: 2,352 m (7,717 ft)
- Prominence: 200 m (660 ft)
- Parent peak: Old Baldy (2726 m)
- Coordinates: 50°56′47″N 115°06′03″W

Geography
- Location within Alberta Location within Canada
- Interactive map of Wasootch Peak
- Location: Alberta, Canada
- Parent range: Fisher Range; Canadian Rockies
- Topo map: NTS 82J14 Spray Lakes Reservoir

Geology
- Rock age: Cambrian
- Rock type: sedimentary rock

Climbing
- Easiest route: Scrambling

Wasootch Peak is a 2,352-metre (7,717-foot) mountain summit located in the Fisher Range of Kananaskis Country in the Canadian Rockies of Alberta, Canada. The peak is situated on the northern end of the ridge that separates Wasootch Creek from Porcupine creek. Wasootch Peak's nearest higher peak is Old Baldy, 1.54 km (0.96 mi) to the southeast. The peak may be seen from Highway 40, and is prominently featured from the ski slopes at Nakiska. Wasootch is from the Stoney language word wazi, which translated means unique.

== Geology ==
Wasootch Peak is composed of sedimentary rock laid down during the Precambrian to Jurassic periods. Formed in shallow seas, this sedimentary rock was pushed east and over the top of younger rock during the Laramide orogeny.

== Climate ==
Based on the Köppen climate classification, Wasootch Peak is located in a subarctic climate zone with cold, snowy winters, and mild summers. Temperatures can drop below −20 °C with wind chill factors below −30 °C. In terms of favorable weather, June through September are the best months to climb. Precipitation runoff from the mountain drains into Wasootch Creek and the Kananaskis River.

== Gallery ==
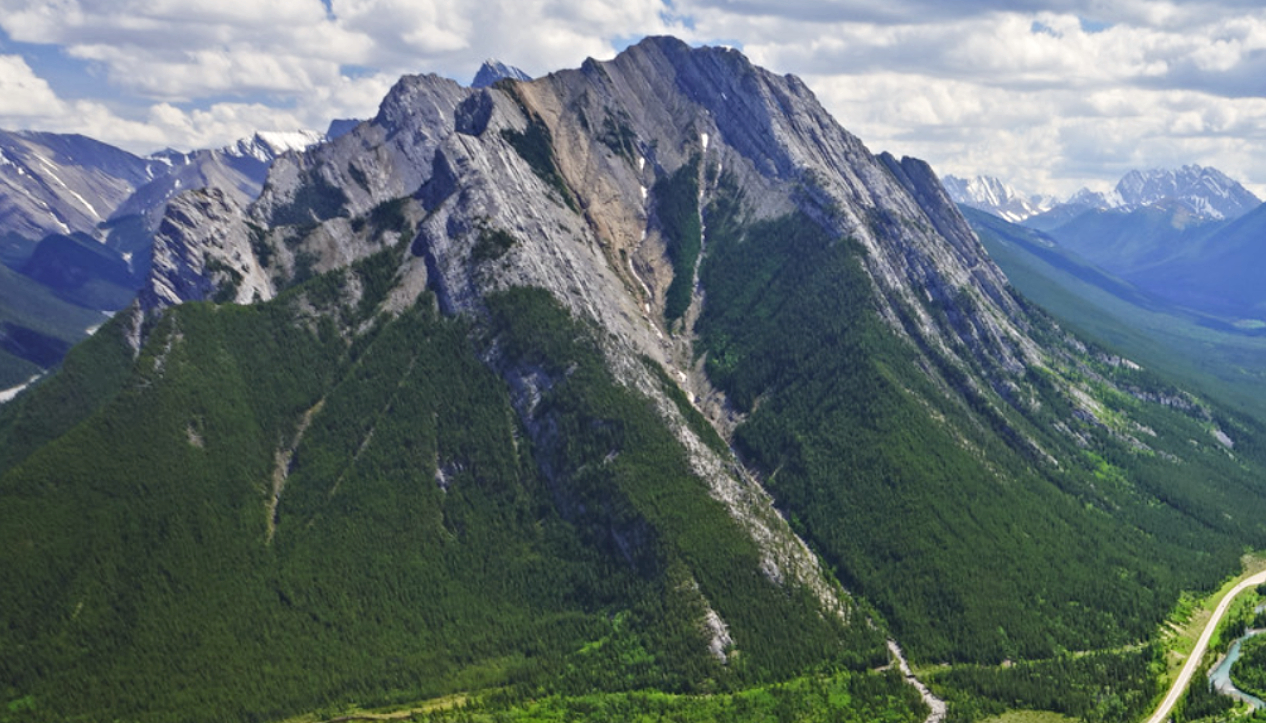
Wasootch Peak

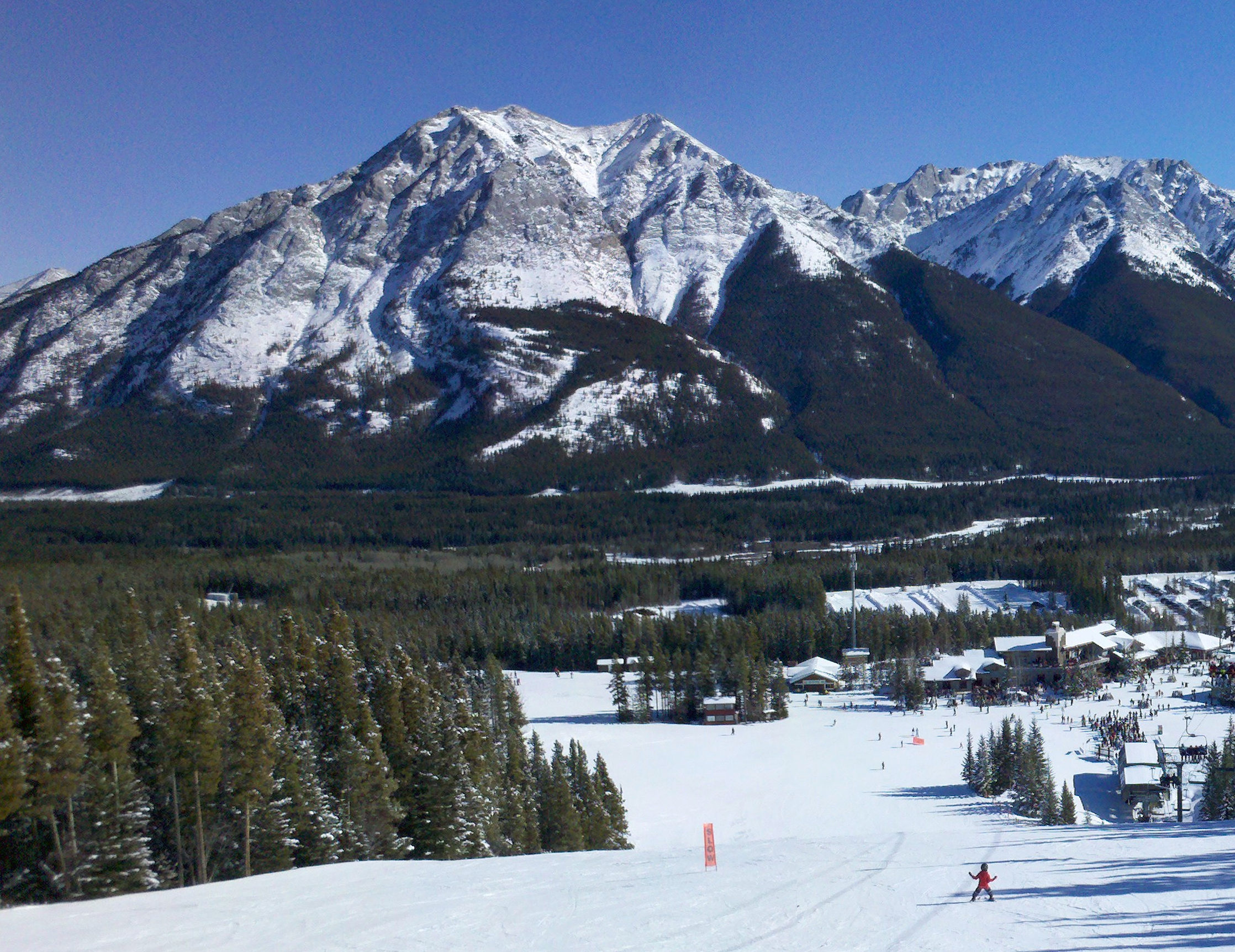
Wasootch Peak seen from Nakiska ski slopes

== See also ==
- Mountains of Alberta
- Geology of Alberta
