= Yellowhead =

Yellowhead or Yellow Head may refer to:

== People ==
- Tête Jaune aka. Pierre Bostonais aka. Pierre Hastination, trapper and explorer of Western Canada
- Ozaawindib, a 19th-century Ojibwa warrior

== Places ==
=== Canada ===
- Yellowhead County, Alberta
- Yellowhead (electoral district), Alberta
- Rural Municipality of Yellowhead, Manitoba
- West Yellowhead (electoral district), Alberta
- Yellowhead Centre, Neepawa, Manitoba
- Yellowhead Lake, British Columbia
- Yellowhead Mountain, Alberta and British Columbia
- Yellowhead Pass mountain pass and National Historic Site, Alberta and British Columbia

=== United States ===
- Yellow Head, Maine, a village in Lincoln County, Maine
- Yellowhead Township, Kankakee County, Illinois

== Highways ==
- Yellowhead Highway in Western Canada
- Yellowhead Trail, Edmonton, Alberta, Canada

== Organisms ==
- Yellowhead (bird)
- Yellowhead disease
- Yellowhead jawfish
- Yellowhead butterflyfish
- Inula, plants in the daisy family
- Trichoptilium, plants in the daisy family
- Zanthoxylum flavum, a citrus plant

== Other uses ==
- Yellowhead (film), a 2013 Canadian short film
