= Donald "Curly" Phillips =

Canadian guide and explorer

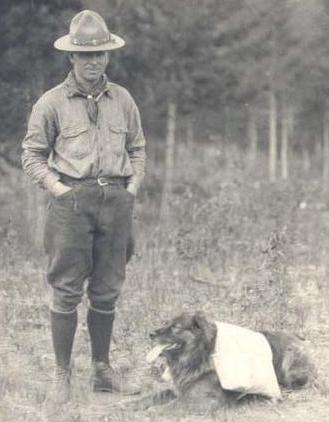
- Phillips with his dog in Jasper, Alberta
- Born: April 15, 1884; Dorset, Ontario, Canada
- Died: March 21, 1938 (aged 53); Jasper National Park
- Occupation: Guide

Donald Nelson "Curly" Phillips (1884-1938) was a Canadian guide, outfitter, entrepreneur, and explorer who was a part of many pioneering expeditions in the northern Canadian Rockies in the early twentieth century. He settled in Jasper, Alberta, and was involved in the development of mountain tourism in the region.

== Early life ==
Phillips was born on April 15, 1884, in the township of Dorset, Ontario, to parents Daniel Alven Phillips and Dorothy Storm Robinson He received a well-rounded education, but spent the bulk of his young life in the forests and on the lakes of Northern Ontario apprenticing in the wilderness life of hunting, fishing, trapping, guiding, and building and navigating boats. The aptitude he showed for entertaining and guiding clients, and the skills he learned in navigation, trail construction, and carpentry would be put to good use in his outfitting career in western Canada. On his twenty-fourth birthday, in 1908, Phillips boarded the Canadian Pacific Railway train in Biscotasing and said goodbye to Ontario to seek his fortune in the Rocky Mountains.

== Climbing in the Canadian Rockies ==
"Curly" Phillips first made a name for himself in the summer of 1909, when he chanced to meet the Rev. George Kinney, alone and struggling with packhorses loaded for an expedition in the waters of the Athabasca River near John Moberly's cabin (east of present-day Jasper) and immediately convinced him to accompany him on an ill-prepared adventure to attempt a third trip on his quest for the first ascent of Mount Robson. Kinney describes him as "A sturdy youth of twenty-five, wearing on his Stetson the silver badge of the Guides Association of Ontario,... A very prince of the trail. Quick, handy, a splendid cook, he made a camp-mate that could not be excelled... and though he had never climbed mountains before that summer, he proved to be a cool-headed and cautious climber." The two proceeded to spend over a month in camp making four large climbs up the northwest side of Robson, the final of which they claimed to have stood on the summit, though this was discredited by the Alpine Club of Canada due to lack of evidence and the unlikely nature of the route and the unsanctioned expedition. Alpine Club founding member and writer Elizabeth Parker later claimed that Phillips admitted in 1913 that they had been stumped by a final dome of ice at the summit that they could not surmount, though he himself, a dedicated diarist, had not written of this climb and never wrote or spoke definitively against it.

Even if not credited with the first ascent of the Monarch of the Rockies, the sensational story catapulted Phillips into the spotlight among mountaineering circles, and he was invited to outfit future expeditions, most notably the 1911 and 1913 Alpine Club Camps at Mount Robson, where he would meet and collaborate with Alpine Club president A. O. Wheeler, scientists from the Smithsonian Institution, and famed climbers and mountain guides, including Conrad Kain, with whom he would share a winter trapline and many backcountry adventures. The success of these trips and his winter trapping in the region convinced him to settle permanently in Jasper townsite, newly accessible by the Grand Trunk Pacific Railway, completed in 1913.

== Career and family life ==
In 1913, Phillips built a corral and store, as well as a house in town, and moved his parents and his brother and sister out from Ontario to live in Jasper and help with the businesses. In 1923, he married Grace Inkster and they had three children: Sam (1928), Joy (1930), and Ivy (1932). Over the years, "Curly" would develop his cabins and facilities in order to better outfit climbers, scientists, hunters, academics, and tourists, and guide trips on horseback, by canoe and powerboat, or by ski, snowshoe, and float plane. He was a much sought-after trail guide and later expanded his enterprise to building boats for outfitting trips on the Athabasca and Peace Rivers, as well developing the first boat tours at Maligne Lake, south of Jasper. He tried many different tourism enterprises, even a brief attempt at a Dude Trap-Line in the winter of 1926-27, which did not go over well enough to continue. He continued to outfit many camps and expeditions for the Alpine Club of Canada, and in the 1930s began to develop access to terrain for skiing and single-handedly built a cabin for alpine ski tours at Shangri-La in the Maligne Range. In 1935 he became president of the Athabasca Guides and Trailmen's Association, a "fitting recognition of his long-continued efforts on behalf of tourism in the Jasper valley." On March 21, 1938, "Curly" Phillips was killed in an avalanche while skiing below Elysium Mountain in Jasper National Park, and is buried in Jasper Cemetery.

== Legacy and achievements ==
Donald "Curly" Phillips built many structures still in use today, including the Shangri-La ski cabin, maintained by the Maligne Lake Ski Club, and the original boathouse at Maligne Lake. He also built the first incarnation of the still heavily used trail from the Robson River past Kinney Lake and the "flying trestle" stairs and walkways through the Valley of a Thousand Falls to Berg Lake in Mount Robson Provincial Park. He came very close to first ascents of the summits of Mount Robson and Mount Sir Alexander and is the only recorded trail guide and outfitter to have led roped ascents of major peaks in the Canadian Rockies including attempts on Mount Sir Alexander and success on Mount Bess in 1915. Mount Phillips is named in his honour.
