= Swiftcurrent Falls (British Columbia) =

Waterfall in British Columbia, Canada

- Interactive map of Swiftcurrent Falls
- Location: Mount Robson Provincial Park, British Columbia, Canada
- Coordinates: 53°07′41″N 119°19′11″W
- Type: Cascade
- Total height: 537 metres (1,762 ft)
- Watercourse: Swiftcurrent Creek
- World height ranking: 100th

For the waterfall in Montana with the same name, see Swiftcurrent Falls (Montana).

Swiftcurrent Falls is a major waterfall located on Swiftcurrent Creek near its source. The falls are one of the taller waterfalls in Canada but have never been officially measured.

== Stature ==
Swiftcurrent Falls likely stands about 537 m (1,762 ft) high as the creek drops out of 2 small glacier lakes that are located just below the toe of the Swiftcurrent Glacier. The falls plunge madly down a headwall into the remote Swiftcurrent Creek Valley. Not a lot is known about the falls other than its great height & geology since it is so remote.

== Geology ==
The rock the falls drop over is limestone. Much of the rock in the mountains in the Mount Robson Provincial Park area is limestone. Since Swiftcurrent Creek is such a large creek (even near its source) & limestone is very porous rock, the creek has carved large grooves & even tunnels (which the water of the falls flows in & out of) in the headwall. Most of the time, most of the water flowing over the falls isn't even visible since most of it is underground. It is believed that in very high water that the falls flow above ground however, generally most of the year most portions of it are underground in the tunnels the falls have carved in the limestone.

== See also ==
- List of waterfalls
- List of waterfalls in British Columbia
- List of waterfalls in Canada
- Toboggan Falls
- Arctomys Falls
- Arctomys Cave
