= Mount Anne-Alice =

Mountain in British Columbia, Canada

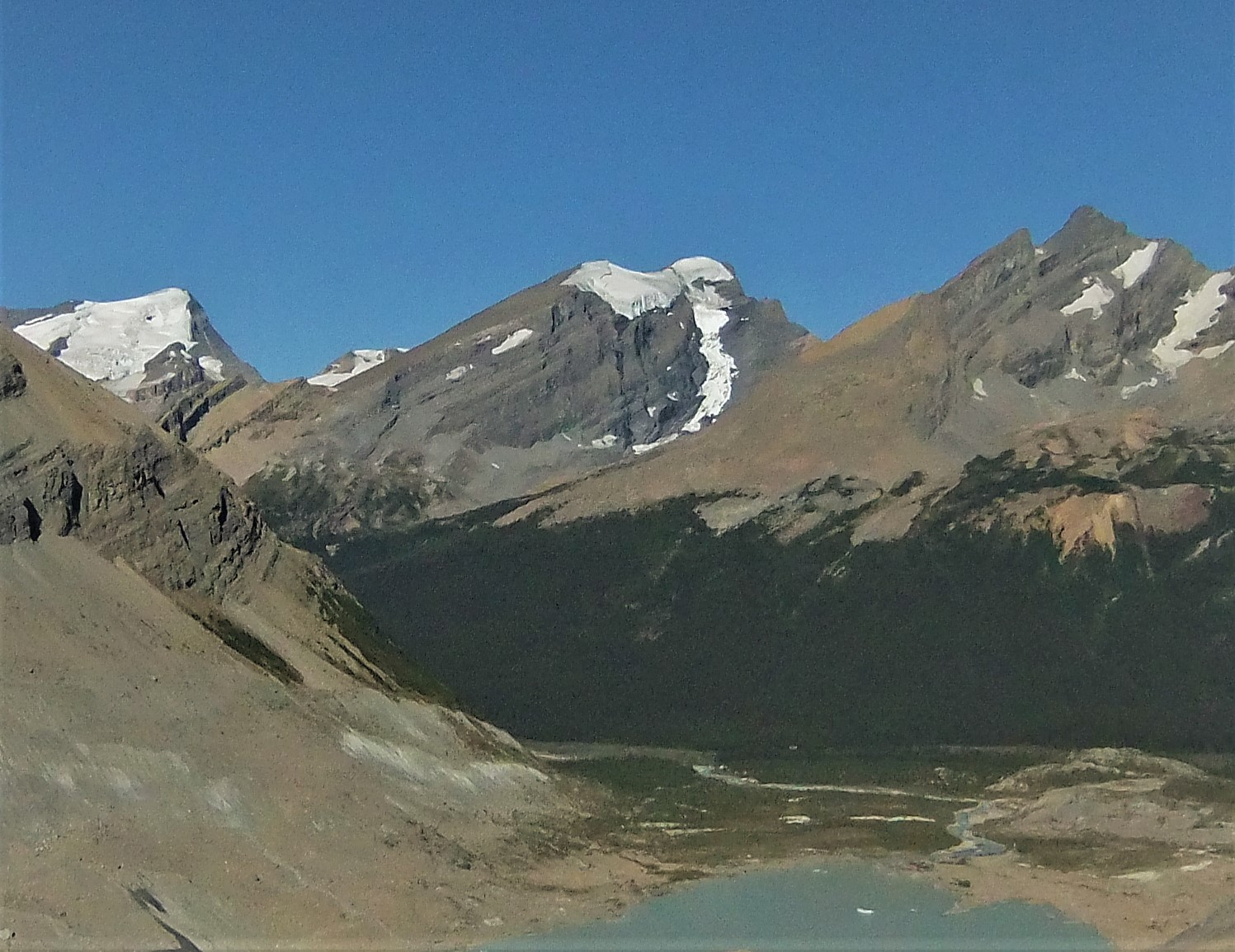
- Mt. Anne-Alice centered, from southeast. Mt. Phillips (left), subsidiary of Mumm Peak (right)

Highest point
- Elevation: 2,941 m (9,649 ft)
- Prominence: 262 m (860 ft)
- Parent peak: Whitehorn Mountain (3,399 m)
- Isolation: 3.8 km (2.4 mi)
- Listing: Mountains of British Columbia
- Coordinates: 53°10′48″N 119°12′09″W

Geography
- Location within British Columbia Location within Canada
- Interactive map of Mount Anne-Alice
- Country: Canada
- Province: British Columbia
- District: Cariboo Land District
- Protected area: Mount Robson Provincial Park
- Parent range: Canadian Rockies → Park Ranges
- Topo map: NTS 83E3 Mount Robson

Climbing
- First ascent: 1939

Mount Anne-Alice is a mountain summit in the Canadian Rockies of British Columbia, Canada.

== Description ==
Mount Anne-Alice is located on the Continental Divide just inside the Mount Robson Provincial Park boundary. It is situated on the northwest side of Berg Lake with precipitation runoff from the peak draining into the lake and Robson River. Topographic relief is significant as the summit rises 1,300 m (4,300 ft) above the lake in 4.5 km (2.8 mi). The nearest neighbor is Mumm Peak, 3.8 km (2.4 mi) to the east. The mountain is composed of sedimentary rock laid down during the Precambrian to Jurassic periods and pushed east and over the top of younger rock during the Laramide orogeny.

== History ==
The first ascent of the summit was made in 1939 by Anne MacLean Chesser and Alice Wright. They named the mountain after themselves since they found no evidence of a prior ascent. They built a stone cairn at the summit and claimed first ascent. Anne MacLean was a partner in the tourism and outfitting business at Mount Robson. Alice Wright was a frequent visitor at Berg Lake Chalet through the 1930s and 40s and was a well-known member of the tourism/outfitting industry throughout the Rockies. Alice was known to climbers as the "Mother Confessor of Mount Robson" because they would consult her before their ascents since she knew so much about the mountain. The mountain's toponym was officially adopted December 7, 1990, by the Geographical Names Board of Canada.

== Climate ==
Based on the Köppen climate classification, Mount Anne-Alice is located in a subarctic climate zone with cold, snowy winters, and mild summers. Winter temperatures can drop below −20 °C with wind chill factors below −30 °C. This climate supports the Mural and Hargreaves glaciers on the peak's slopes.

== Gallery ==
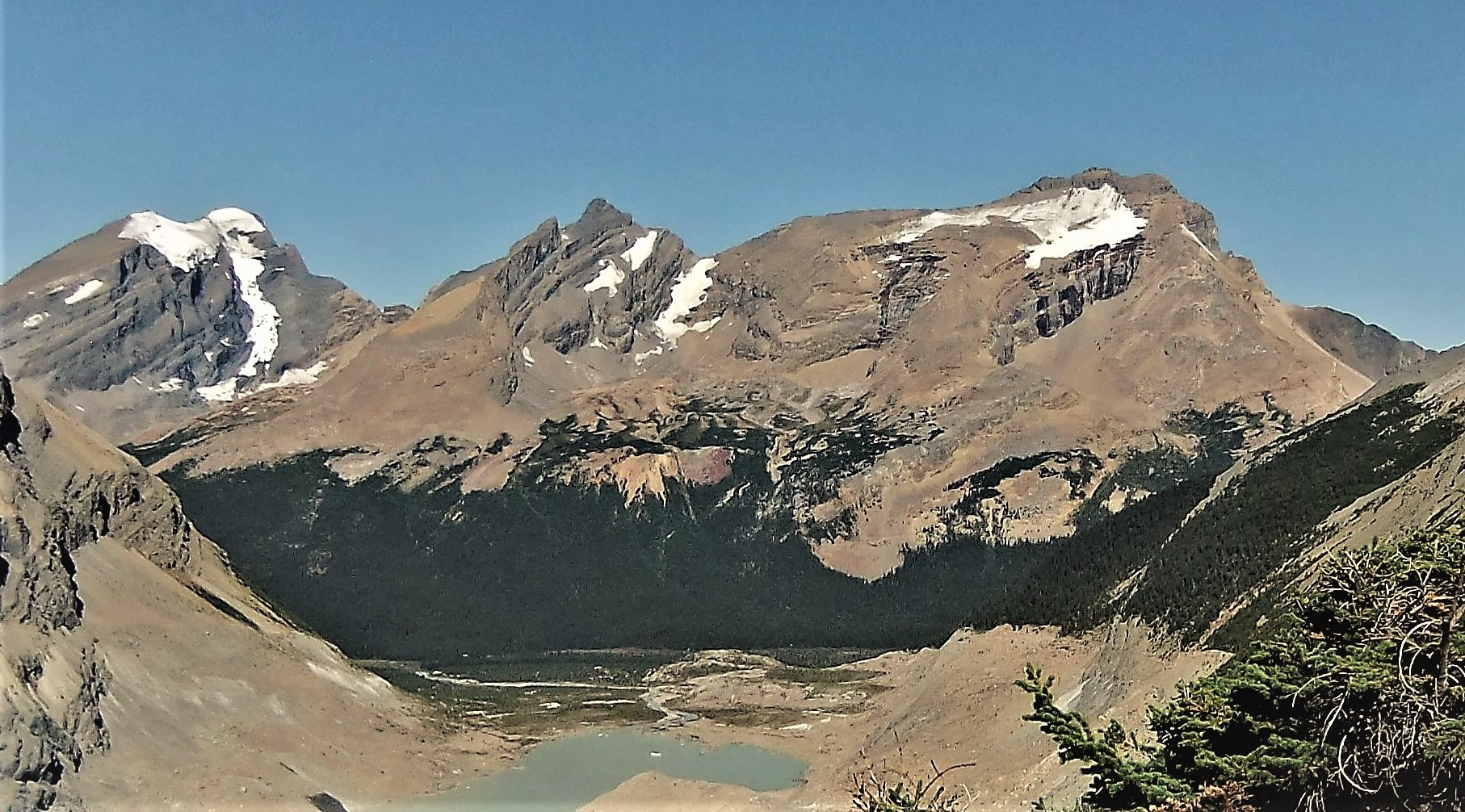
Mount Anne-Alice (left) and Mumm Peak (right)

== See also ==
- List of peaks on the Alberta–British Columbia border
- Geography of British Columbia
