= Valley of a Thousand Falls =

Valley in British Columbia, Canada

Coordinates: 53°07′00″N 119°12′00″W

Valley Of A Thousand Falls is a valley located in the Cariboo region of British Columbia. The valley is located between Berg Lake and Kinney Lake in Mount Robson Provincial Park.
