= Mount Phillips =

Mount Phillips may refer to:

- Mount Phillips (Canada), a mountain on the Continental Divide on the border between British Columbia and Alberta, Canada
- Mount Phillips (Antarctica) a snow-covered mountain situated on the Borchgrevink Coast, Victoria Land, Antarctica
- Mount Phillips (Montana)
- Mount Phillips (New Mexico)
- Mount Phillips (Vancouver Island)

== See also ==
- Mount Philipps, a mountain in New Zealand
