= Yellowhead Mountain =

Mountain in Western Canada

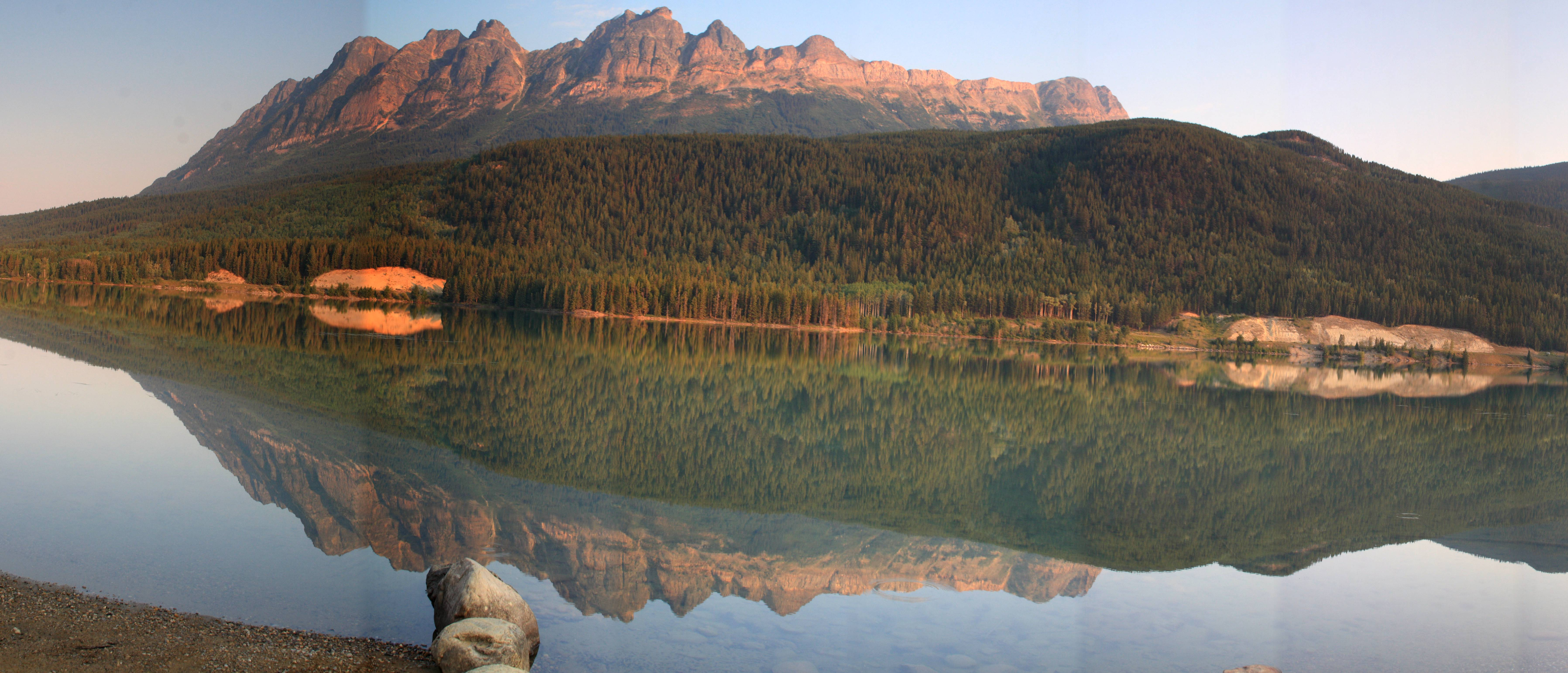
- Yellowhead Mountain from Yellowhead Lake

Highest point
- Elevation: 2,458 m (8,064 ft)
- Prominence: 343 m (1,125 ft)
- Parent peak: Rink Peak (2664 m)
- Listing: Mountains of Alberta; Mountains of British Columbia
- Coordinates: 52°52′51″N 118°36′55″W

Naming
- Native name: Ya·kⱡi·ki

Geography
- Location within Alberta Location within British Columbia Location within Canada
- Country: Canada
- Provinces: Alberta and British Columbia
- District: Cariboo Land District
- Protected area: Mount Robson Provincial Park
- Parent range: Victoria Cross Ranges
- Topo map: NTS 83D15 Lucerne

Yellowhead Mountain is located west of Yellowhead Pass in Mount Robson Provincial Park and straddles the Continental Divide marking the Alberta-British Columbia border. It was named for Pierre Bostonais aka Tête Jaune. The mountain has four officially named summits: Bingley Peak, Leather Peak, Lucerne Peak, and Tête Roche.

== Climate ==
Based on the Köppen climate classification, Yellowhead Mountain is located in a subarctic climate zone with cold, snowy winters, and mild summers. Temperatures can drop below −20 °C with wind chill factors below −30 °C. In terms of favorable weather, July through September are the best months to climb.

== Gallery ==
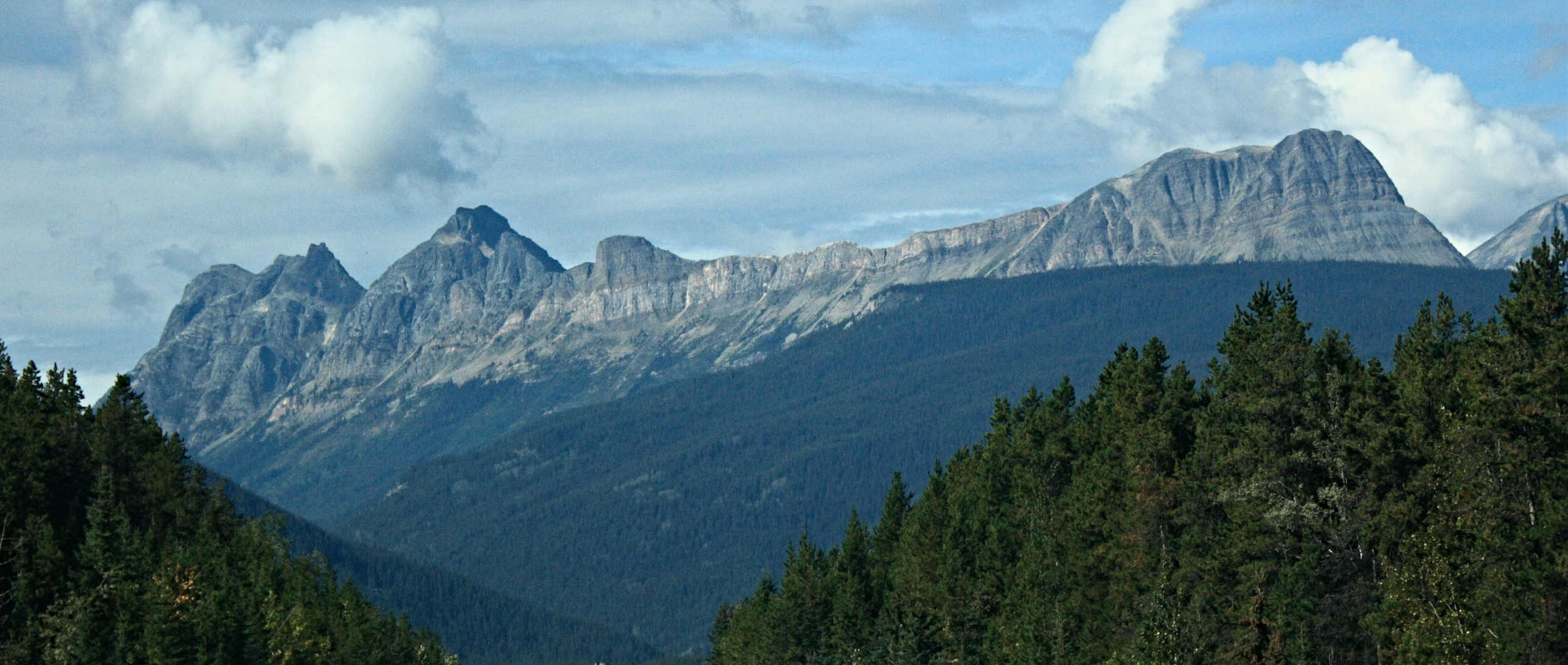
Yellowhead Mountain with Leather Peak, Lucerne Peak, and Tete Roche (right) seen from westbound Highway 16

== See also ==
- List of peaks on the Alberta–British Columbia border
