= Mumm Peak =

Mountain in Alberta/British Columbia, Canada

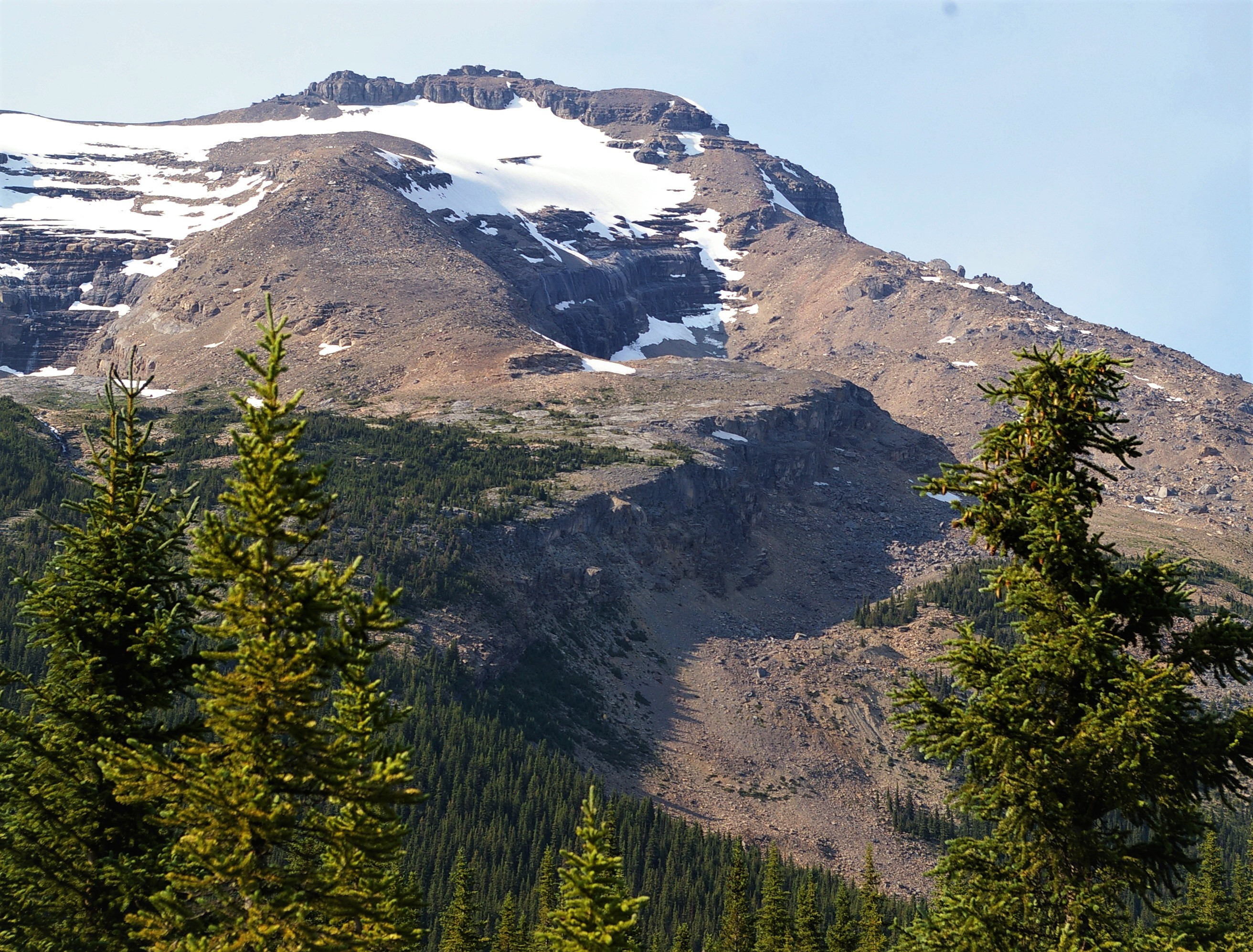
- South aspect

Highest point
- Elevation: 2,962 m (9,718 ft)
- Prominence: 414 m (1,358 ft)
- Listing: Mountains of Alberta; Mountains of British Columbia
- Coordinates: 53°11′28″N 119°08′52″W

Geography
- Location within Alberta Location within British Columbia Location within Canada
- Country: Canada
- Provinces: Alberta and British Columbia
- District: Cariboo Land District
- Parent range: Park Ranges, Canadian Rockies
- Topo map: NTS 83E3 Mount Robson

Climbing
- First ascent: 1910 J. Norman Collie, A.L. Mumm, Moritz Inderbinen

Mumm Peak is located just north of Berg Lake at the northern end of Mount Robson Provincial Park, on the Alberta/British Columbia border. The peak lies on the common boundary shared by Jasper National Park and Mount Robson Provincial Park. It was named in 1910 by J. Norman Collie after Arnold L. Mumm (1859–1927), an English publisher and mountaineer who made the first ascent of this peak with Collie. The mountain is composed of sedimentary rock laid down during the Precambrian to Jurassic periods and pushed east and over the top of younger rock during the Laramide orogeny.

== Climate ==
Based on the Köppen climate classification, Mumm Peak is located in a subarctic climate zone with cold, snowy winters, and mild summers. Winter temperatures can drop below −20 °C with wind chill factors below −30 °C.

== Gallery ==
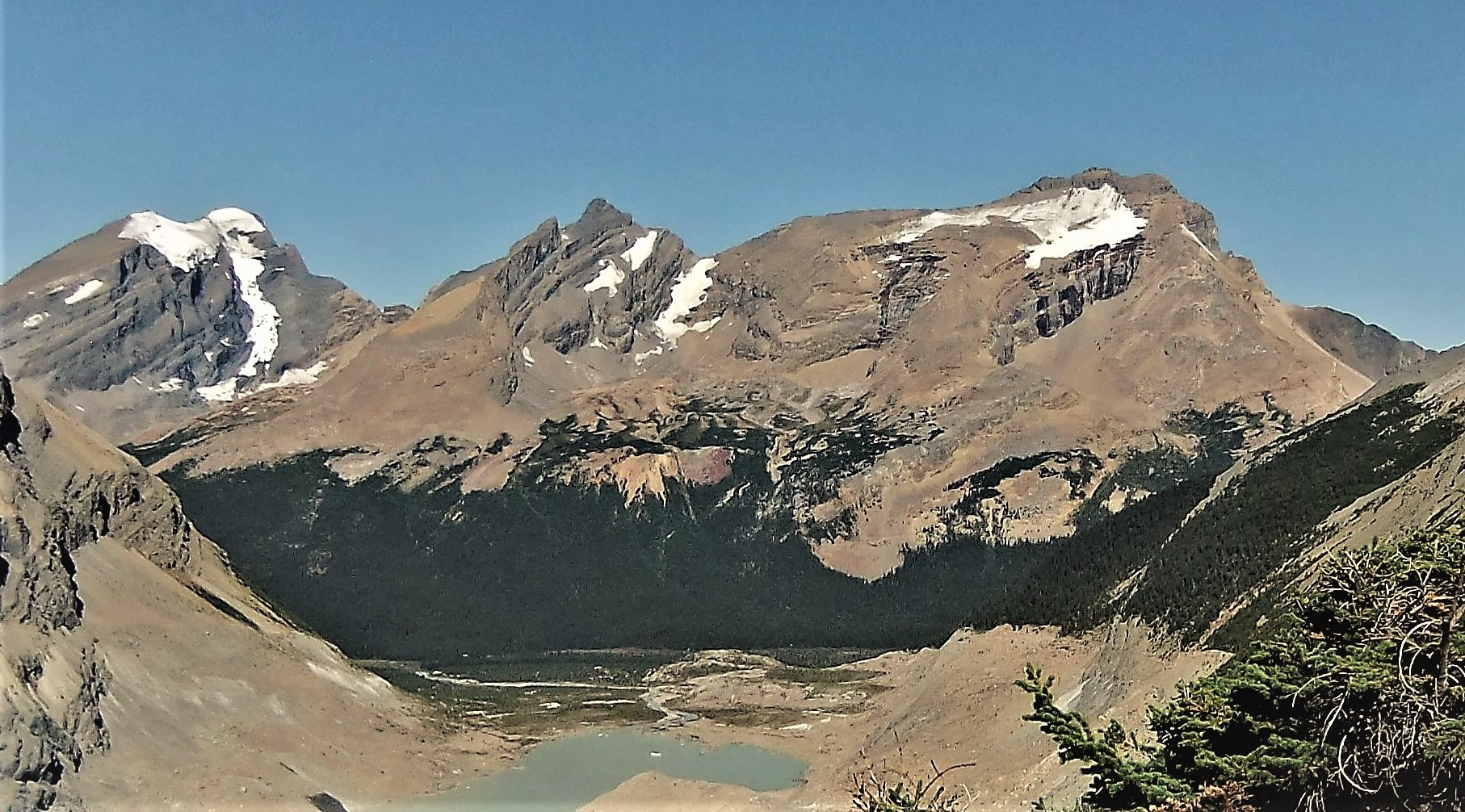
Mt. Anne-Alice (left) and Mumm Peak (right)

== See also ==
- List of peaks on the Alberta–British Columbia border
