= Moose River (British Columbia) =

Location
- Country: Canada
- Province: British Columbia
- District: Cariboo Land District

Physical characteristics
- Source: Near Moose Pass
- Mouth: Fraser River
  - location: Just upstream from Moose Lake
  - coordinates: 52°54′50″N 118°48′28″W
  - elevation: 3,392 ft (1,034 m)

The Moose River is a river in Mount Robson Provincial Park of British Columbia. It is the first "river" tributary of the Fraser, entering the Fraser just above the inlet to Moose Lake, which is along the course of the Fraser and not the Moose.

== Course ==
The Moose River originates about 1.7 kilometres (1.1 mi) southeast of Moose Pass and flows southeast for about 6.4 kilometres (4.0 mi) before turning south at its confluence with Campion Creek. The river flows south briefly before gradually turning from south to southwest over a stretch of about 13.5 kilometres (8.4 mi). The river then goes south once again until its confluence with Resplendent Creek, which is almost as big as the river when it joins it, after about 7.4 kilometres (4.6 mi). Resplendent Creek was once known as the West Fork Moose River. The river then turns southeast again for another 8.7 kilometres (5.4 mi). The last 2 kilometres (1.2 mi) of the river’s course is spent running southwest, under the Yellowhead Highway and into the Fraser shortly after.

== Rainbow Canyon ==
Rainbow Canyon is a short, 0.4-kilometre (0.25 mi) long canyon on the lower reaches of the Moose. Its mouth is located about 0.4 upstream from the Moose River Bridge along the Yellowhead Highway. Within the canyon, the river loses about 186 feet (57 m) of elevation.

== Tributaries ==
- Campion Creek
- Steppe Creek
- Upright Creek
- Colonel Creek
- Arctomys Creek
- Resplendent Creek
- McNaughton Creek

== See also ==
- List of rivers of British Columbia
- Arctomys Cave
