= Emperor Falls =

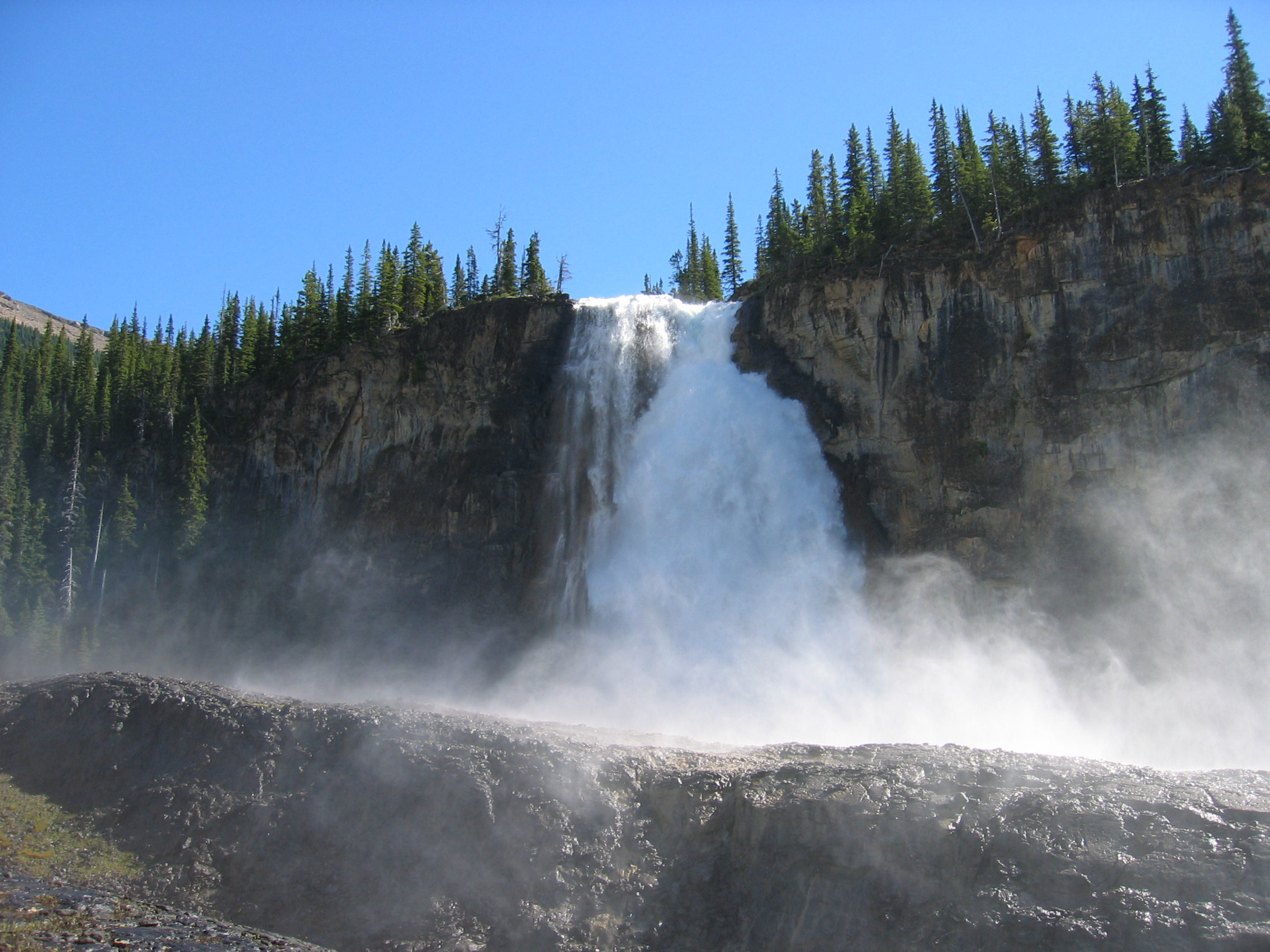
- Interactive map of Emperor Falls
- Location: Mount Robson Provincial Park, Canada
- Coordinates: 53°07′50″N 119°12′18″W
- Type: Fan
- Elevation: 5,300 feet (1,600 m)
- Total height: 142 feet (43 m)
- Number of drops: 1
- Longest drop: 142 feet (43 m)
- Watercourse: Robson River

Emperor Falls is the largest and best known waterfall on the Robson River in Mount Robson Provincial Park. It is located a short distance downstream of and southwest from the outlet of Berg Lake.

== Stature ==
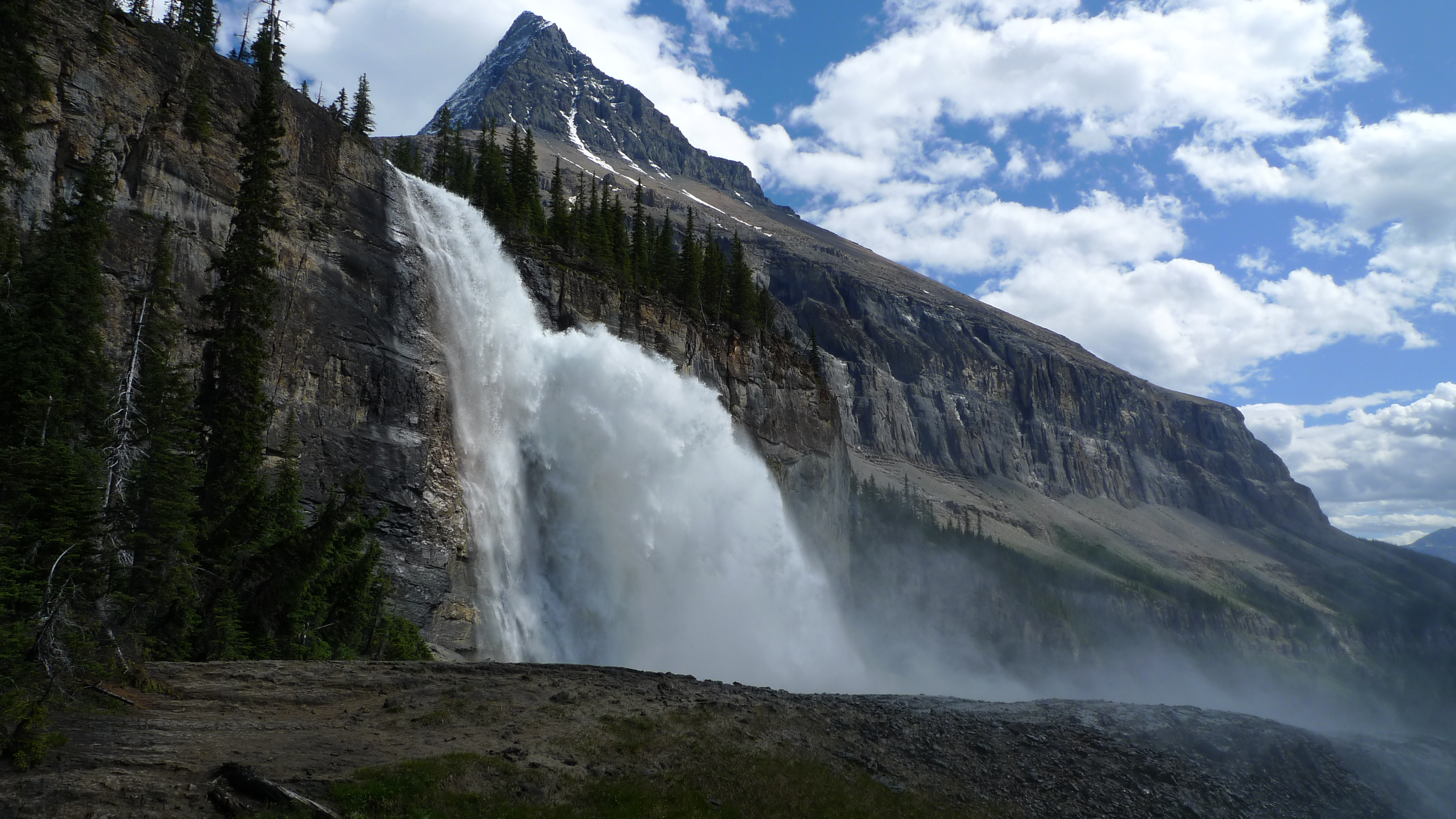
Side view of Emperor Falls.

The falls stand 142 feet high, 5300 ft above sea level. After dropping over the edge of the cliff the water strikes a ledge just under halfway down, this causes the formation of a roostertail which produces a large amount of spray.

== Access ==
To get to the falls, you hike along the Berg Lake trail for approximately 15 km, during which time you will gain about 2500 feet of elevation. A more complete description of the hike can be found in the Berg Lake article.

== See also ==
- Mount Robson Provincial Park
- Berg Lake
- List of waterfalls
- List of waterfalls of Canada
- List of waterfalls in British Columbia
