= Swiftcurrent Creek (British Columbia) =

River in British Columbia, Canada

Location
- Country: Canada
- Province: British Columbia
- District: Cariboo Land District

Physical characteristics
- Source: Swiftcurrent Glacier
  - location: Mount Robson Provincial Park
  - coordinates: 53°09′21″N 119°18′06″W
  - elevation: 6,294 ft (1,918 m)
- Mouth: Fraser River
  - location: Mount Robson Provincial Park
  - coordinates: 53°00′46″N 119°16′22″W
  - elevation: 2,615 ft (797 m)

Swiftcurrent Creek is a river in Mount Robson Provincial Park in British Columbia. It is a tributary of the Fraser River, entering the Fraser about 1.7 kilometres (1.1 mi) below the mouth of the Robson River.

== Course ==
Swiftcurrent Creek originates at the toe of the Swiftcurrent Glacier and flows about 3 kilometres (2 mi) southwest. During that time it flows through two small glacier lakes. At the outlet of the second lake the creek, quite large already, plunges down a headwall into the valley below, forming unofficially-named Swiftcurrent Falls, one of the higher waterfalls in Canada. The creek continues southwest for another 3.7 kilometres (2.3 mi). The creek then turns southeast for about 10 kilometres (6 mi) until its confluence with the Fraser. There is about a 6-kilometre (4 mi) long stretch just after the creek turns southeast where the creek bed is wide and the creek runs through the middle. Bordering the creek on both sides are some swamp-like sections that some of the flow from the creek enters before re-entering the mainstream further downstream.

The Yellowhead Highway crosses the creek about 0.5 kilometres (0.3 mi) above its mouth. The creek is not entirely within Mount Robson Park; shortly above the bridge over the creek on the Yellowhead Highway the creek leaves the boundaries of the park.

== See also ==
- List of rivers of British Columbia
