= Margaret Peterson (artist) =

American painter

- Born: 1902; Seattle
- Died: May 15, 1997 (aged 94–95)
- Education: University of California, Berkeley
- Movement: Abstract art

Margaret Peterson (1902 - May 15, 1997) was an American painter of abstract art and known for creating a style that was highly influenced by the art of the Indigenous peoples of North America.

== Biography ==
Peterson was born in Seattle, Washington. In the 1920s she studied at the University of California, Berkeley, graduating in 1926 with a Bachelor in Arts and soon joined its faculty of Fine Arts in 1928. The years between 1928 and 1950 were productive years for Peterson; this included a funded trip to Europe (1931), several exhibitions, marriage to her husband, the Canadian writer Howard O'Hagan (1937), and a year spent at Green Point, Cowichan Bay, British Columbia to study Indigenous Art in Victoria's former anthropological museum (1947–1948). In 1950, at the height of McCarthyism, she rejected an oath of loyalty imposed by the University of California, Berkeley's board of regents and left her faculty position for New York, where she would have a solo exhibition at the former Algonquin Hotel.

Throughout the 1950s, she would continue to exhibit and travel. In 1951, she went to both Mexico and Guatemala and saw the arts of the Toltecs, Zapotecs, Aztecs, and Mayan cultures and also returned to Cowichan Bay. In 1952 she returned to San Francisco and founded a painting school. By 1956 she had moved to Victoria, BC. During the 1960s she would go on to learn mosaic techniques in Europe (1963), pursue a new interest in Romanesque and Medieval painting (1964), and have a mosaic of hers, Source of Sources (1964), installed in the McPherson Library at the University of Victoria. In the 1970s, she returned to Victoria (1974), created a mosaic for the Richard Blanshard Building (1976–1977), and had a retrospective exhibition at the Art Gallery of Greater Victoria (1978). Her husband died in 1982 and Peterson died on May 15, 1997.

== Artistic practice ==
Abstract art is to representative art what poetry is to prose. --Margaret Peterson

Throughout her career, Peterson drew from many influences, especially from abstract and Indigenous artworks. In her early career, she was mainly influenced by cubist and other modernist artists. She has said that after seeing work by Georges Braque and Pablo Picasso, that “They changed my direction in art, and life”. She was also influenced by the Mexican artists Carlos Mérida and Rufino Tamayo, whom she had both met in Mexico City in 1934. From these influences came her interest in form “as a symbol and a plastic constituent” and after 1949, as Colin Graham has said, her “main formal development after that date lay in her use of space, which became increasingly shallow." She was also known to mainly work in egg tempera instead of oil paints, especially after 1934, which was connected to her interest in Medieval European painting and mixed her colors through overlapping layers on her canvas instead of her palette.

Besides formal elements, she was also greatly interested in spirituality and human spiritual beliefs and practices. To Peterson, formal elements were not only lines and colors on a canvas, but, as she has said, “Every line and every brush stroke is a vital related element to the total composition into which human thought has been transferred." On the topic of abstract art, she has said, “It is the act of man’s continual communion with the universe transformed as by magic into substance." From this interest, she was also greatly influenced by the art and practices of many Indigenous groups, who she saw as giving form to universal forces. It is in this way that she believed “art has been a summoning of those inexorable universal forces which man seeks but over which he has no control."

== Exhibitions ==
=== Solo ===
- California Palace of the Legion of Honor, San Francisco, California, 1933, 1960
- Biblioteca Nacional, Mexico City, 1934
- Henry Museum, Seattle, Washington, 1934
- The San Francisco Art Museum, Civic Center, 1950, 1958, 1973
- Du Casse Studio, San Francisco, 1958
- University of California, San José, 1958
- Monterey Peninsula Chapter of American Federation of Arts, California, 1965
- Art Gallery of Greater Victoria, British Columbia, 1950, 1959, 1962, 1978

=== Group ===
- Fourth Biennal Exhibition of Canadian Art
- Fifth Biennal Exhibition of Canadian Art
- National Gallery, Ottawa, 1961, 1962
- São Paulo Biennale, Brazil, 1963

== Awards ==
- Tansing Travelling Fellowship, University of California, 1931-1932
- First prize, San Francisco Women Artists, 1936, 1952
- Purchase Award San Francisco Art Association, 1942
- First Prize, San Francisco Art Association, 1947
- Blue Ribbon, Pacific Artists Festival, 1952
- Canada Council Senior Grant, 1963

== Collections ==
- Confederation Memorial Building, Charlottetown, Prince Edward Island, Canada
- National Gallery of Canada, Ottawa
- Oakland Art Museum, California
- Palace of Legion of Honor, San Francisco, California
- University of Victoria, British Columbia
- Her personal papers are held at the University of Victoria Archives and were donated by the Greater Victoria Art Gallery in 2010
