= Yellowhead Lake =

Lake in British Columbia, Canada

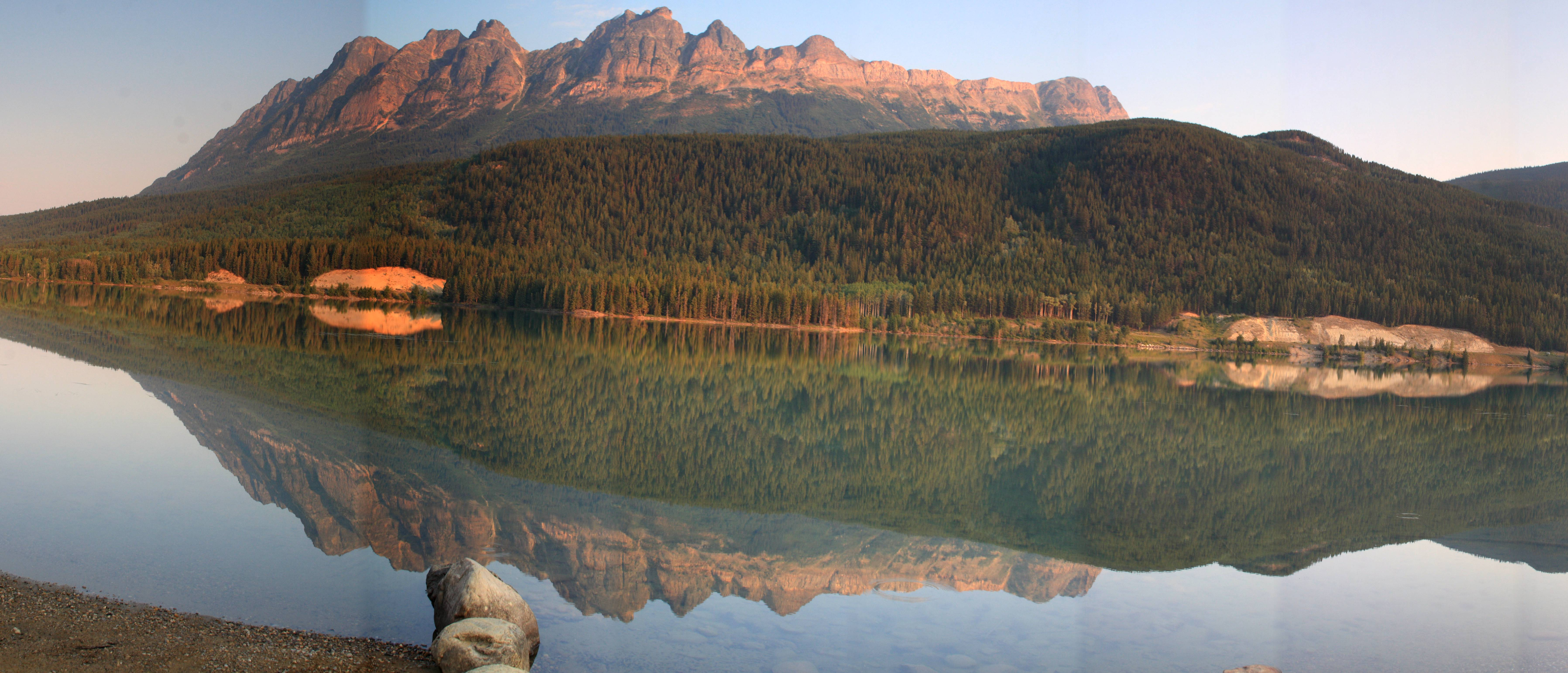

- Location within British Columbia Location within Canada
- Location: Mount Robson Provincial Park
- Coordinates: 52°52′00″N 118°32′00″W
- Primary inflows: Yellowhead Creek, Rockingham Creek
- Primary outflows: Yellowhead Creek
- Basin countries: Canada
- Max. length: 5.6 km (3.5 mi)
- Surface elevation: 3,635 feet (1,108 m)
- Islands: None
- Settlements: None

Yellowhead Lake is an irregularly shaped lake that is located about 3.7 km southwest of Yellowhead Pass within the boundaries of Mount Robson Provincial Park. It is on the lower reaches of Yellowhead Creek, a large creek that flows into the upper Fraser River above Moose Lake.

== Characteristics ==
Yellowhead Lake is a very odd shaped lake. It is about 5.6 km long & its width varies depending on where you are. The lake is fed at its northeast end by Yellowhead Creek, which flows through several swamps above the lake before entering it. About ¼ of the way down its southern shore, its only other named tributary, swift-flowing Rockingham Creek enters the lake. Yellowhead Creek exits the lake at its southwestern end & soon reaches the Fraser after passing under the Yellowhead Highway.

== Naming ==
The lake was first referred to as Cranberry Lake by HBC governor George Simpson as he made his way toward Athabasca Pass in 1824. In 1863, the lake was called Buffalo Dung Lake by Overlanders in search of gold. It was in 1872 that the lake was given its present name, as suggested by George Grant. He named it after the nearby pass.

== See also ==
- List of lakes of British Columbia
