= Moose Lake (British Columbia) =

Lake in British Columbia, Canada

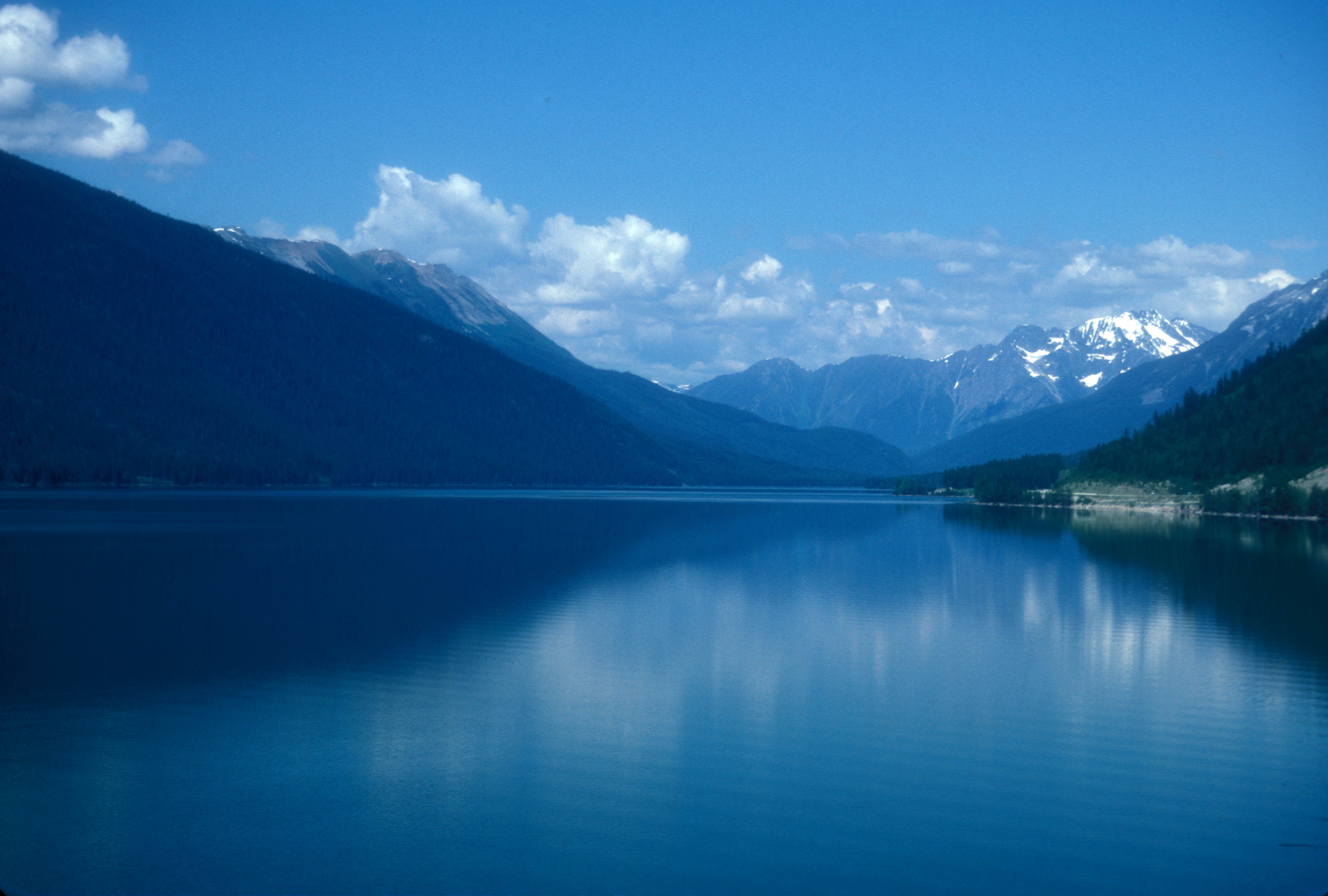

- Location within British Columbia
- Location: Mount Robson Provincial Park
- Coordinates: 52°57′00″N 118°55′00″W
- Primary inflows: Fraser River
- Primary outflows: Fraser River
- Basin countries: Canada
- Max. length: 11.7 km (7.3 mi)
- Max. width: 1.9 km (1.2 mi)
- Islands: None
- Settlements: None

Moose Lake is the only lake along the course of the Fraser River. It is in Mount Robson Provincial Park, British Columbia, Canada, along the upper reaches of the river about 3.9 km downstream from the mouth of the Moose River.

== Characteristics ==
Moose Lake is a long, medium width lake that is wider at its inlet and more narrow toward the outlet. It is 11.7 km long and 1.9 km wide at its widest point which is near its inlet. At its east end, the Fraser flows into the lake after going through a marsh. The river exits the lake at its west end. The Yellowhead Highway and the Canadian National Railway (Via Rail's Canadian and Jasper–Prince Rupert train also use the CN tracks) follow the north lake shore closely.

== See also ==
- List of lakes of British Columbia
