= Leather Peak =

Mountain in Alberta and British Columbia, Canada

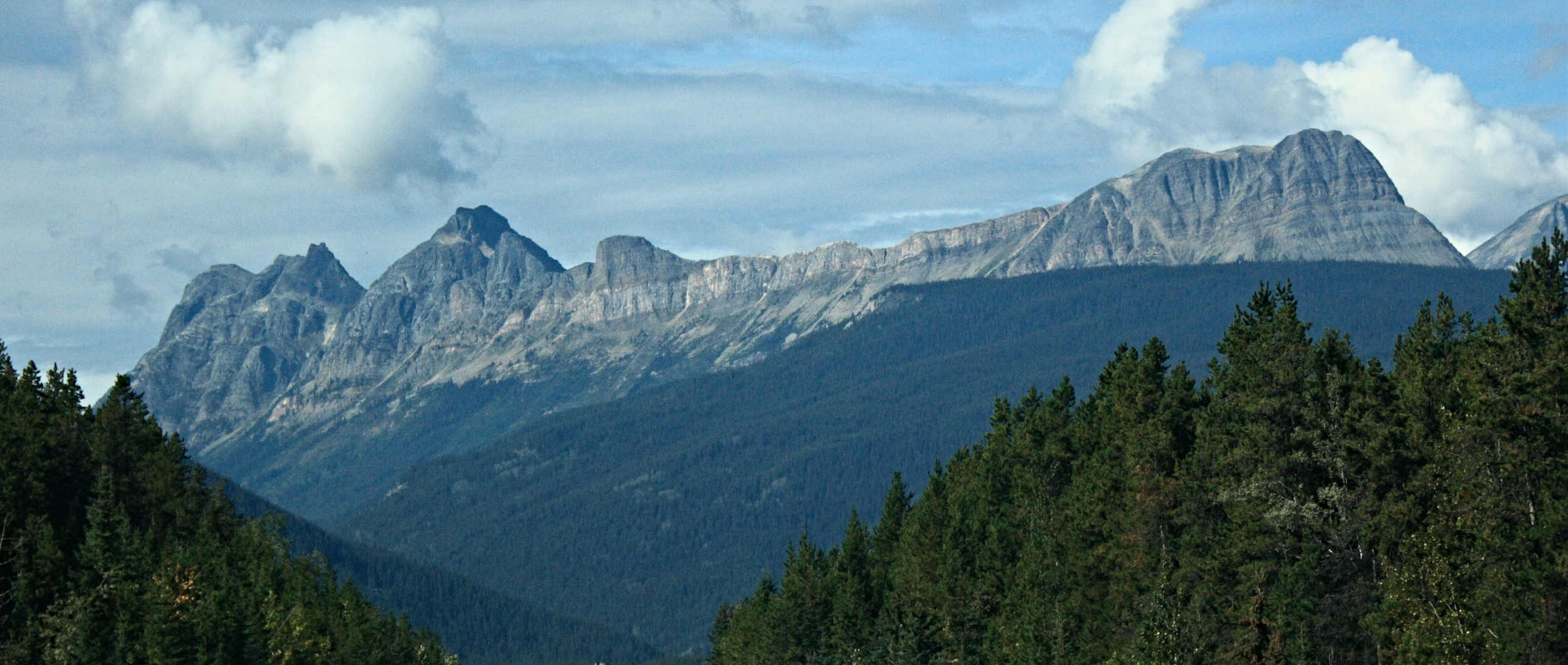
- Yellowhead Mountain

Highest point
- Elevation: 2,457 m (8,061 ft)
- Coordinates: 52°52′47″N 118°36′11″W

Geography
- Location within Alberta Location within British Columbia Location within Canada
- Country: Canada
- Provinces: Alberta and British Columbia
- Topo map: NTS 83D15 Lucerne

Leather Peak is located on the border of Alberta and British Columbia and is the highest of the four peaks on Yellowhead Mountain. The peak was named in 1918 by Arthur O. Wheeler.

== See also ==
- List of peaks on the Alberta–British Columbia border
- List of mountains of Alberta
- Mountains of British Columbia
