= Howard O'Hagan =

Canadian writer (1902–1982)

Howard O'Hagan (February 17, 1902 – September 18, 1982) was a Canadian writer. One of the first significant writers to have been born in Western Canada, he was most noted for his 1939 novel Tay John.

Born in Lethbridge, Alberta, O'Hagan worked as a surveyor in the Canadian Rockies as a young adult before studying law at McGill University; however, once graduating he practiced law for only a month before leaving the occupation and returning to work as a mountain guide. He subsequently worked for a time as head of publicity for the Central Argentine Railway.

He was married to artist Margaret Peterson, with whom he resided in a variety of international locations before settling in Victoria, British Columbia.

Tay John, his most significant published work, was a fictionalized account of the life of Tête Jaune, an Iroquois fur trader who was a significant figure in the development of the Canadian West. His later works included Wilderness Men (1958), The Woman Who Got on at Jasper Station and Other Stories (1963) and The School Marm Tree (1977).

Following O'Hagan's death, Tay John was reissued by McClelland and Stewart's New Canadian Library series in 1989, and the Writers Guild of Alberta created the Howard O'Hagan Award for Short Fiction to honour short story collections published by Alberta writers.

== Works ==
- Tay John (1939)
- Wilderness Men (1958)
- The Woman Who Got on at Jasper Station and Other Stories (1963)
- The School Marm Tree (1977)
