= Arctomys Falls =

- Interactive map of Arctomys Falls
- Location: Mount Robson Provincial Park
- Coordinates: 53°03′57″N 118°53′50″W
- Watercourse: Arctomys Creek

Arctomys Falls is a waterfall on Arctomys Creek in Mount Robson Provincial Park of British Columbia. The falls results when Arctomys Creek drops out of Arctomys Valley toward its confluence with the Moose River. The falls and creek are fed by Arctomys Lake.

Arctomys Cave, Canada's second-deepest cave, is located near the upper sections of the falls.

== See also ==
- List of waterfalls
- List of waterfalls in British Columbia
