= Mount Phillips (Canada) =

Mountain in the country of Canada

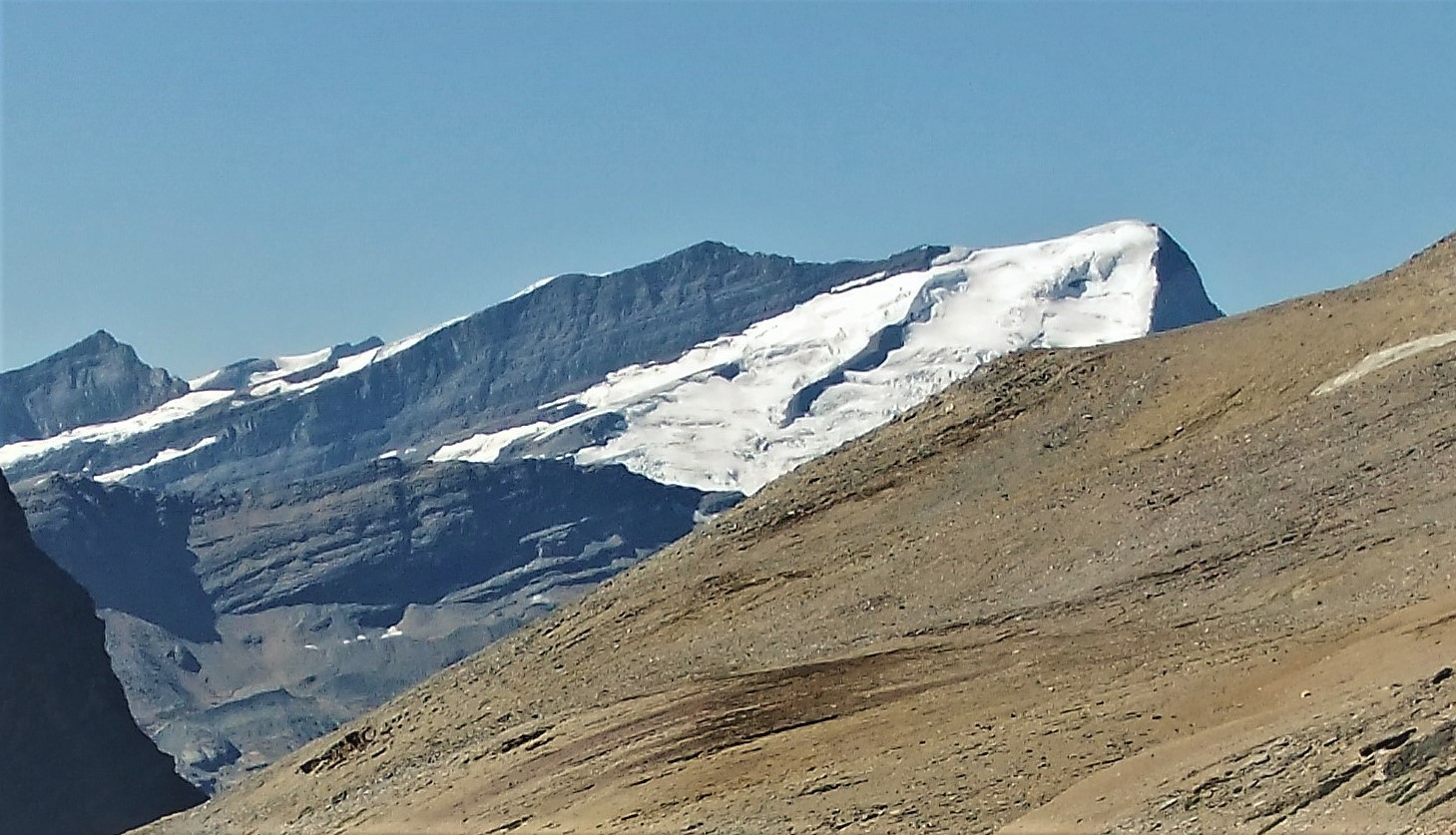
- East-southeast aspect, from Snowbird Pass

Highest point
- Elevation: 3,246 m (10,650 ft)
- Prominence: 524 m (1,719 ft)
- Parent peak: Whitehorn Mountain (3399 m)
- Listing: Mountains of Alberta; Mountains of British Columbia
- Coordinates: 53°10′39″N 119°15′37″W

Geography
- Location within Alberta Location within British Columbia Location within Canada
- Country: Canada
- Provinces: Alberta and British Columbia
- Protected areas: Jasper National Park; Mount Robson Provincial Park
- Parent range: Park Ranges
- Topo map: NTS 83E3 Mount Robson

Climbing
- First ascent: 1910 by J. Norman Collie, A.L. Mumm, J. Yates

Mount Phillips is a mountain located on the border of Jasper National Park (Alberta) and Mount Robson Provincial Park (British Columbia). It is Alberta's 61st highest peak, and British Columbia's 84th highest peak. It was named in 1923 by J. Norman Collie after Donald "Curly" Phillips, a Jasper area outfitter and guide who made the disputed first ascent of Mount Robson in 1909.

== See also ==
- List of peaks on the Alberta–British Columbia border
