= Mount Philipps =

Mountain in Fiordland, New Zealand

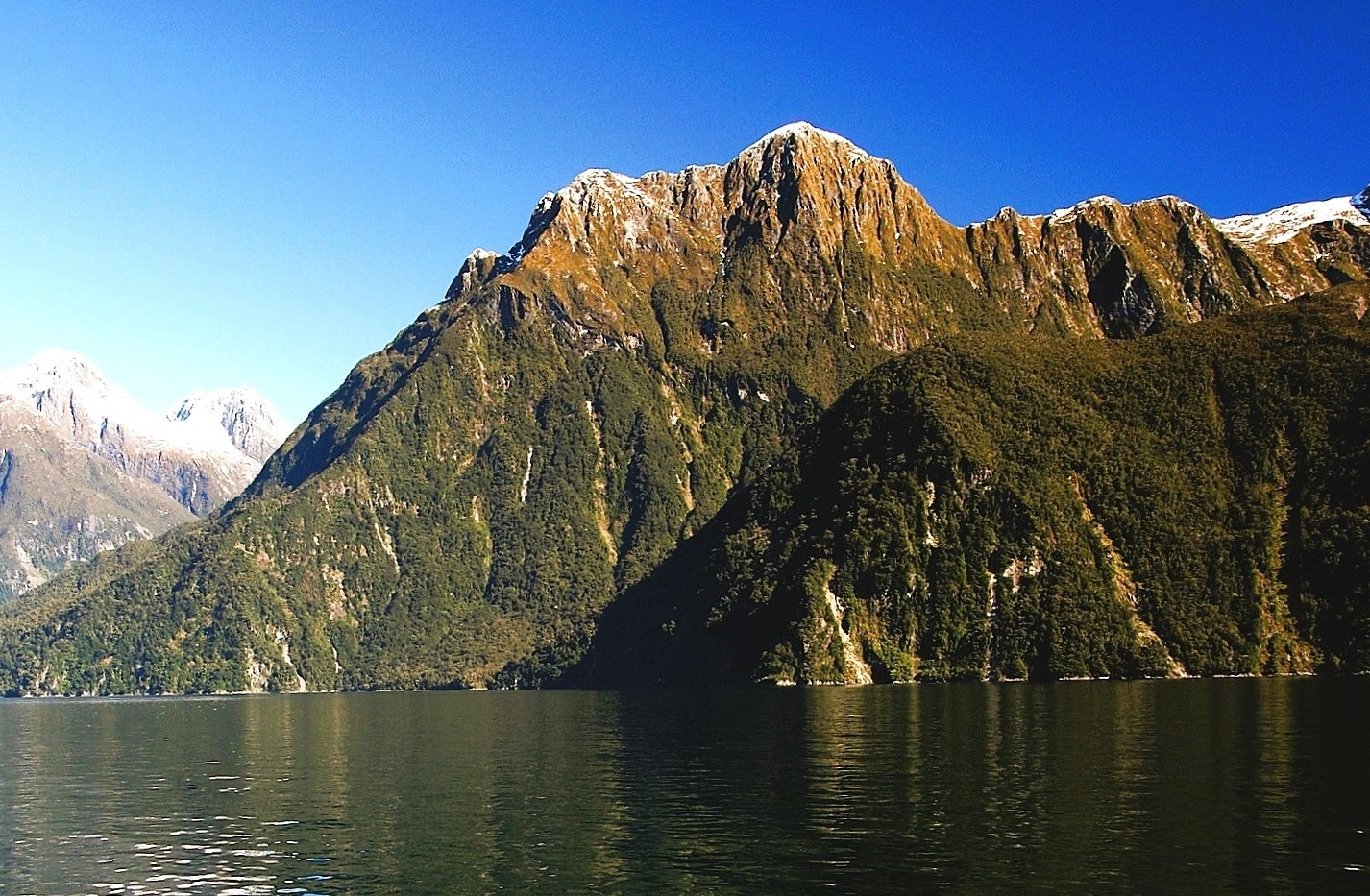
- North aspect

Highest point
- Elevation: 1,446 m (4,744 ft)
- Prominence: 246 m (807 ft)
- Isolation: 2.12 km (1.32 mi)
- Coordinates: 44°40′01″S 167°52′57″E

Naming
- Etymology: Griffith Grismond Philipps

Geography
- Location within New Zealand
- Interactive map of Mount Philipps
- Location: South Island
- Country: New Zealand
- Region: Southland
- Protected area: Fiordland National Park
- Parent range: Llawrenny Mountains
- Topo map: Topo50 CB08

Geology
- Rock age: 136 ± 1.9 Ma
- Rock type(s): Gabbronorite, dioritic orthogneiss

Mount Philipps is a 1,446-metre-elevation (4,744-foot) mountain in Fiordland, New Zealand.

== Description ==
Mount Philipps is situated above Milford Sound in the Southland Region of the South Island. It is set within Fiordland National Park which is part of the Te Wahipounamu World Heritage Site. Precipitation runoff from the mountain's north slope drains to Milford Sound via Sinbad Gully, and the south slope drains into Milford Sound via Camp Oven Creek and Arthur River. Topographic relief is significant as the summit rises above tidewater of Milford Sound in 1.5 kilometre, and 900 metres (2,953 feet) above Camp Oven Creek in 0.75 kilometre. The nearest higher neighbour is Devils Armchair, 2.12 kilometres to the southwest. The mountain's toponym was applied by Captain John Lort Stokes of the HMS Acheron while charting the coast of New Zealand between 1848–1851 to honour his first Lieutenant, Griffith Grismond Philipps (1811–1891). This mountain's toponym has been officially approved by the New Zealand Geographic Board.

== Climbing ==
Climbing routes:

- East Ridge – T. Barfoot, D.E. Cooper – (1955)
- East Face – First ascent unknown

== Climate ==
Based on the Köppen climate classification, Mount Philipps is located in a marine west coast climate zone. Prevailing westerly winds blow moist air from the Tasman Sea onto the mountains, where the air is forced upward by the mountains (orographic lift), causing moisture to drop in the form of rain or snow. The months of December through February offer the most favourable weather for viewing or climbing this peak.

== See also ==
- List of mountains of New Zealand by height

== Gallery ==
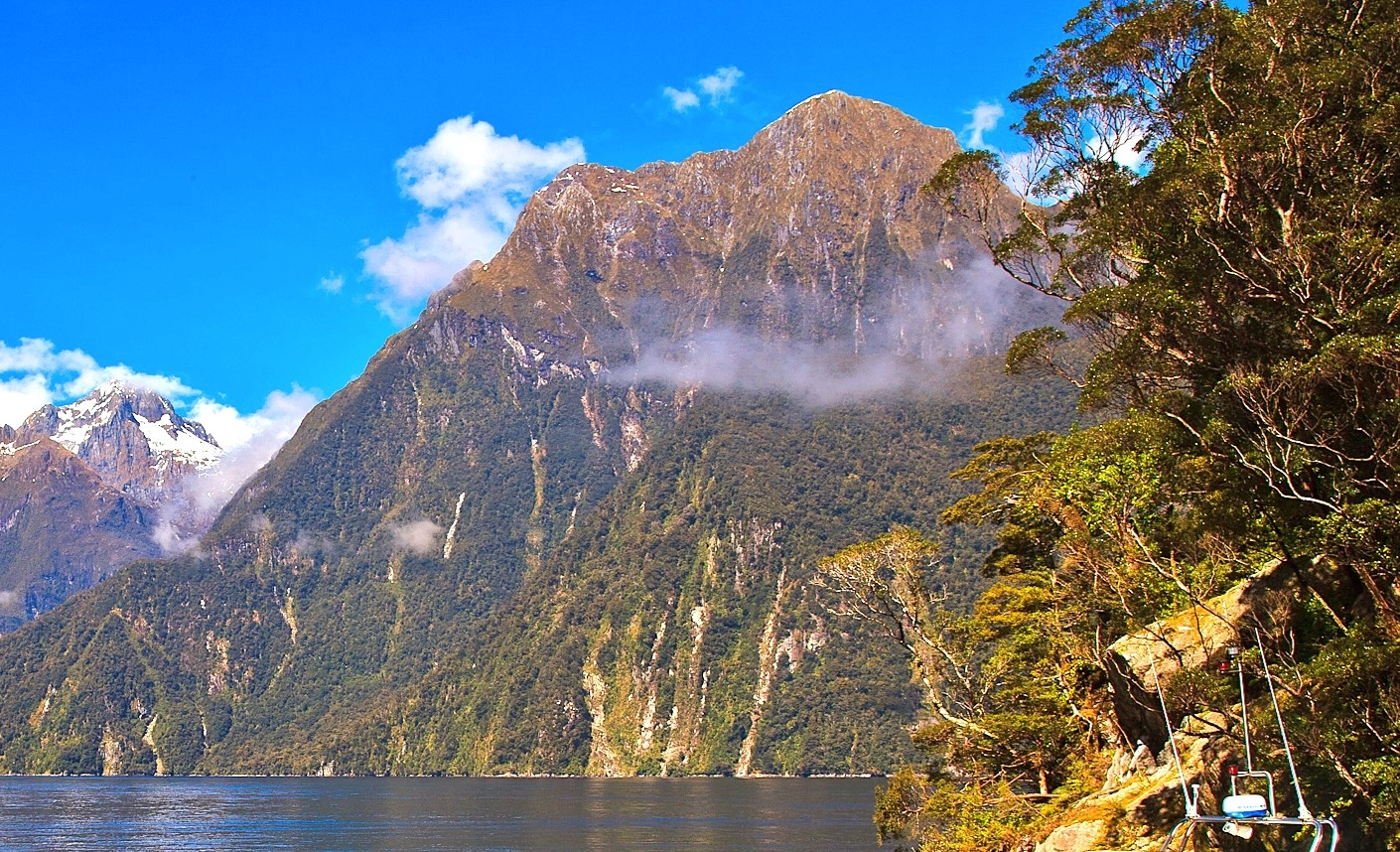
North aspect of Mount Philipps
(Odyssey Peak to left)

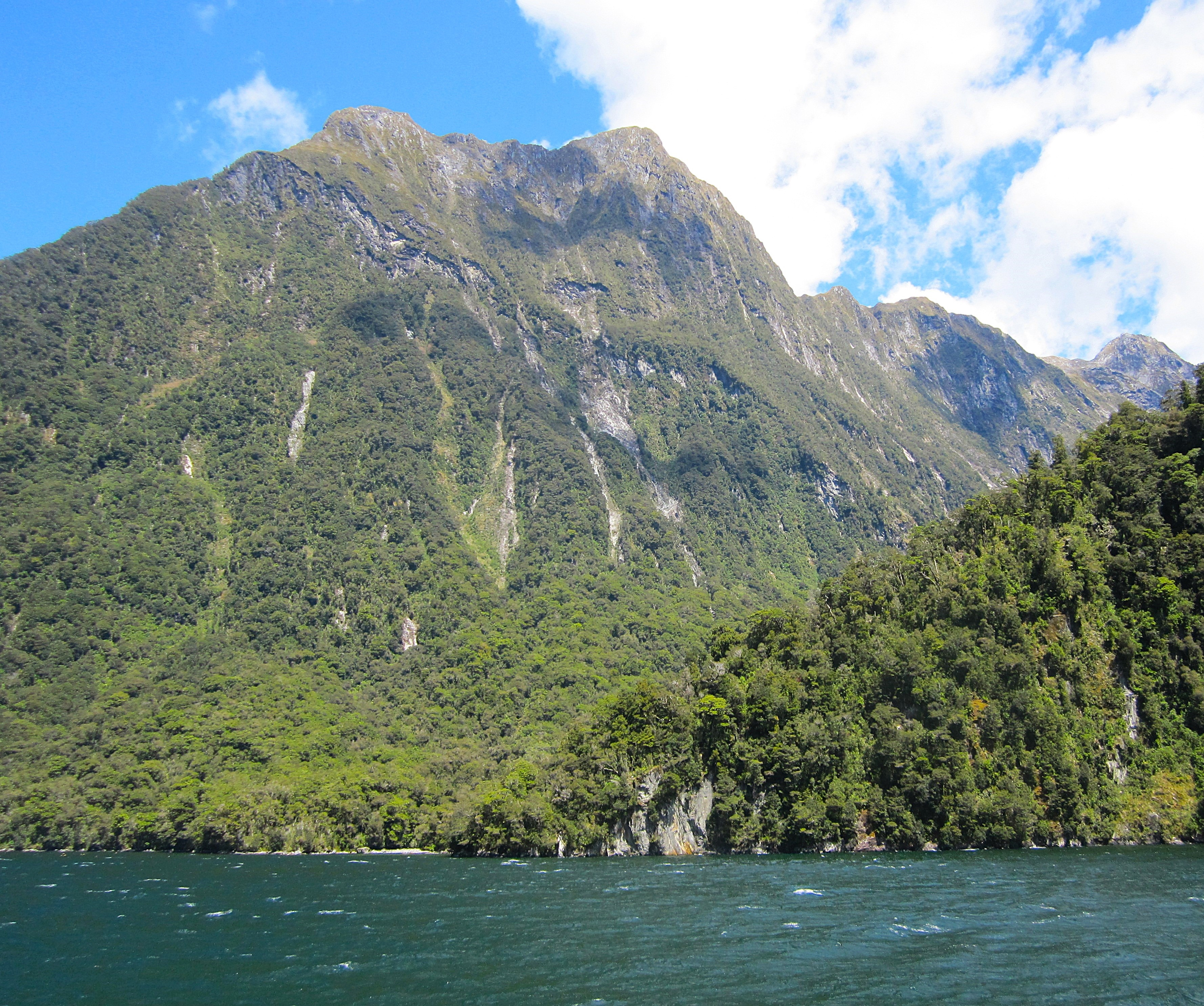
Northeast aspect

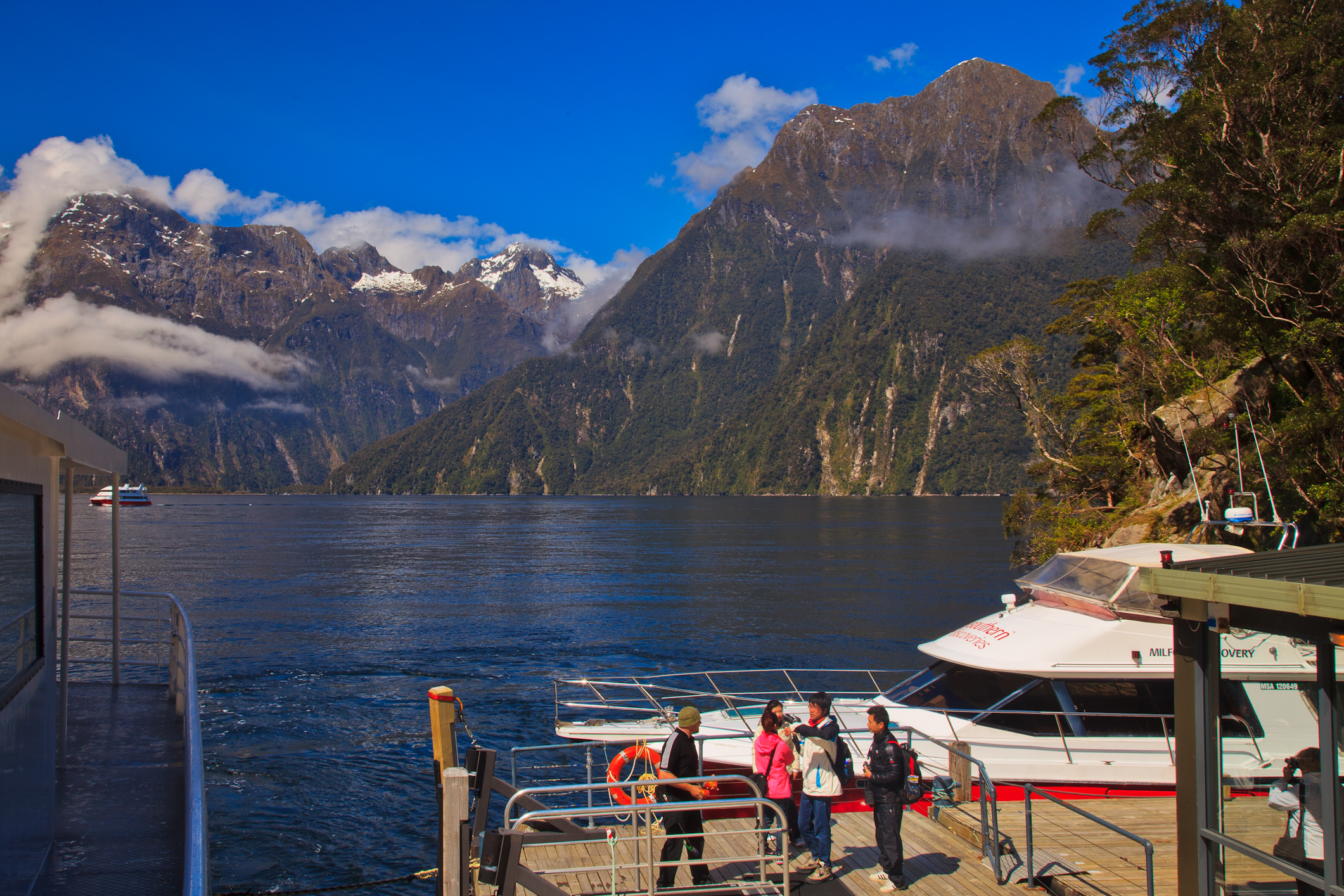
Mount Philipps to right

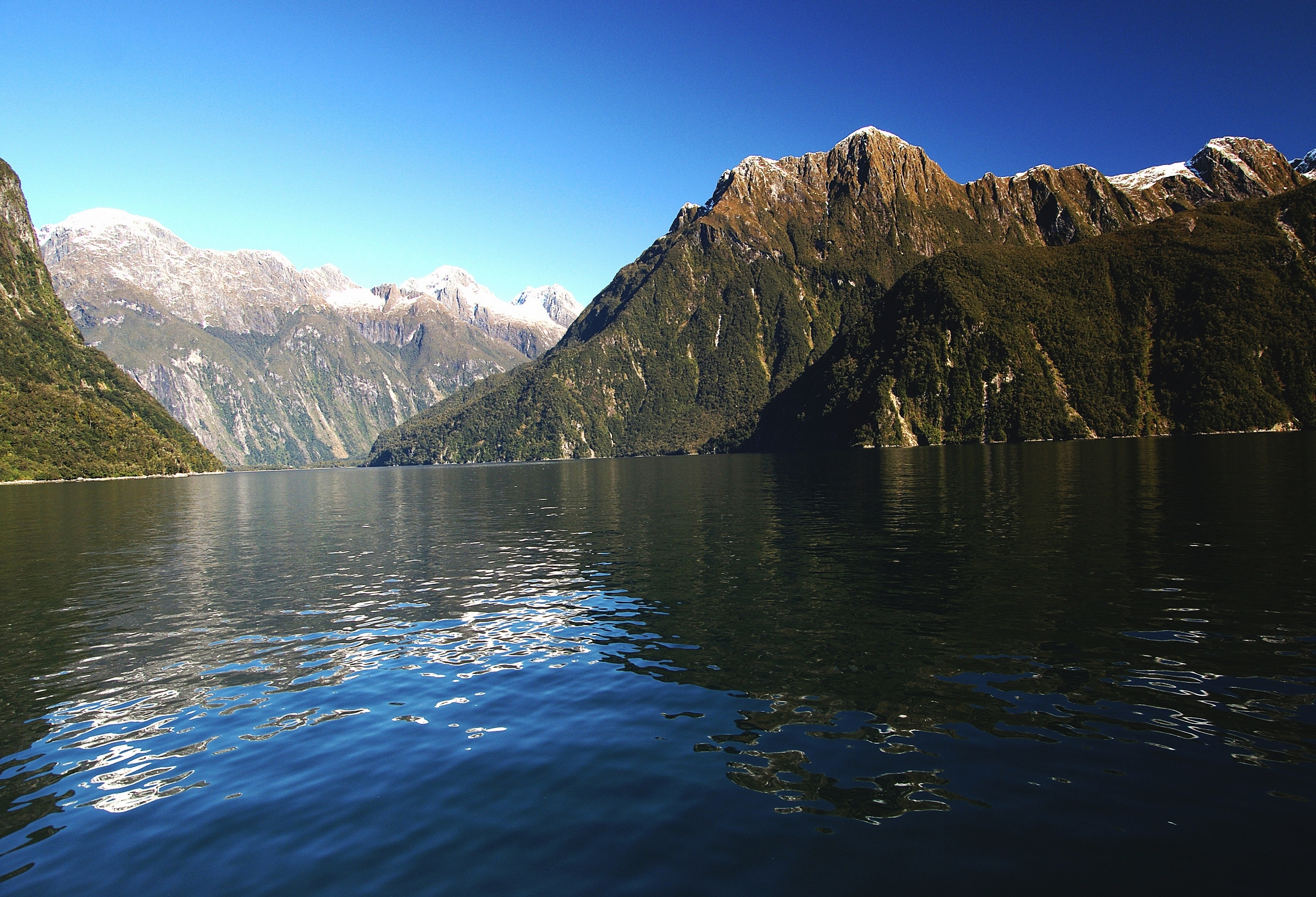
Mount Philipps to right of centre

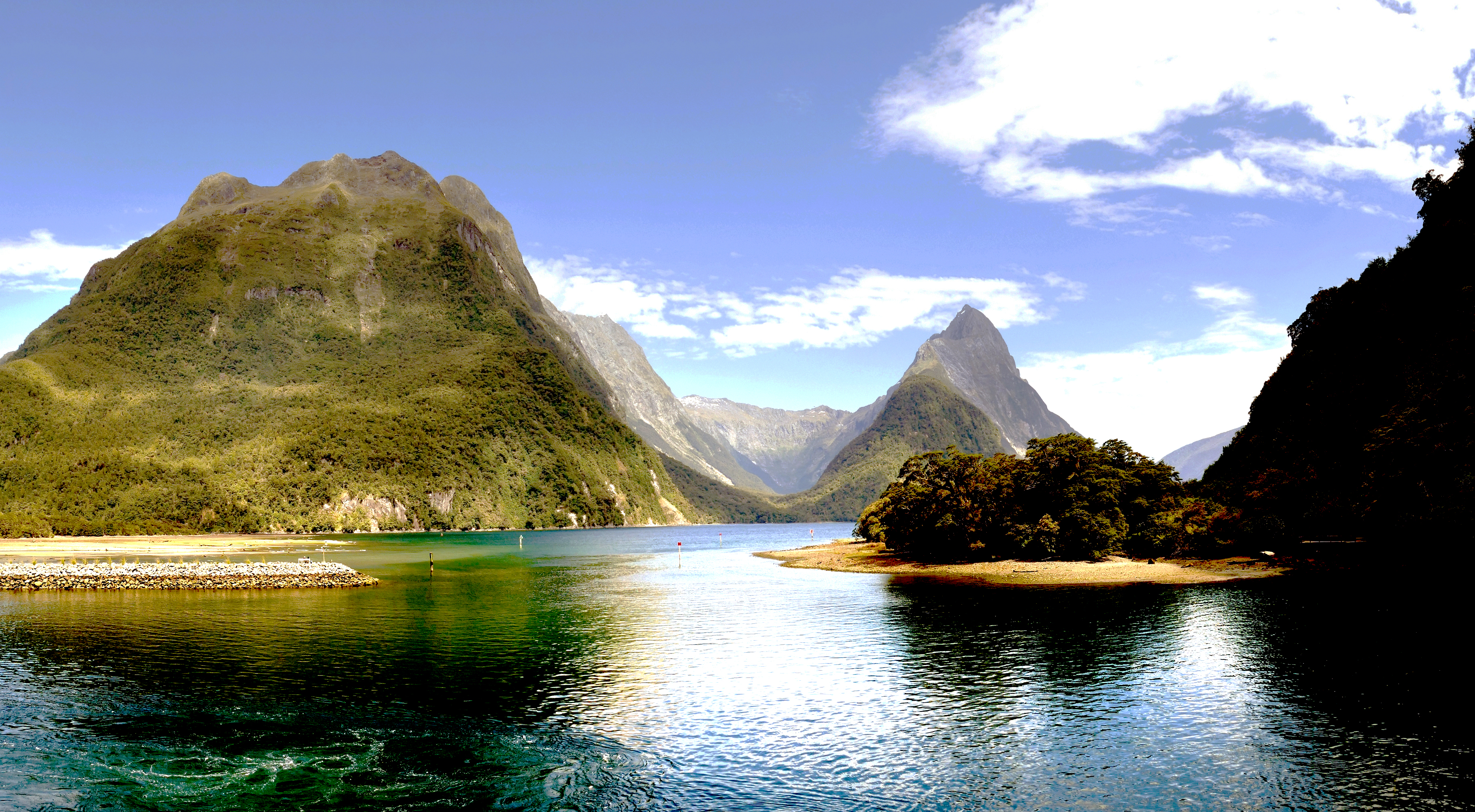
East slope of Mount Philipps (left) with Mitre Peak (right of centre)

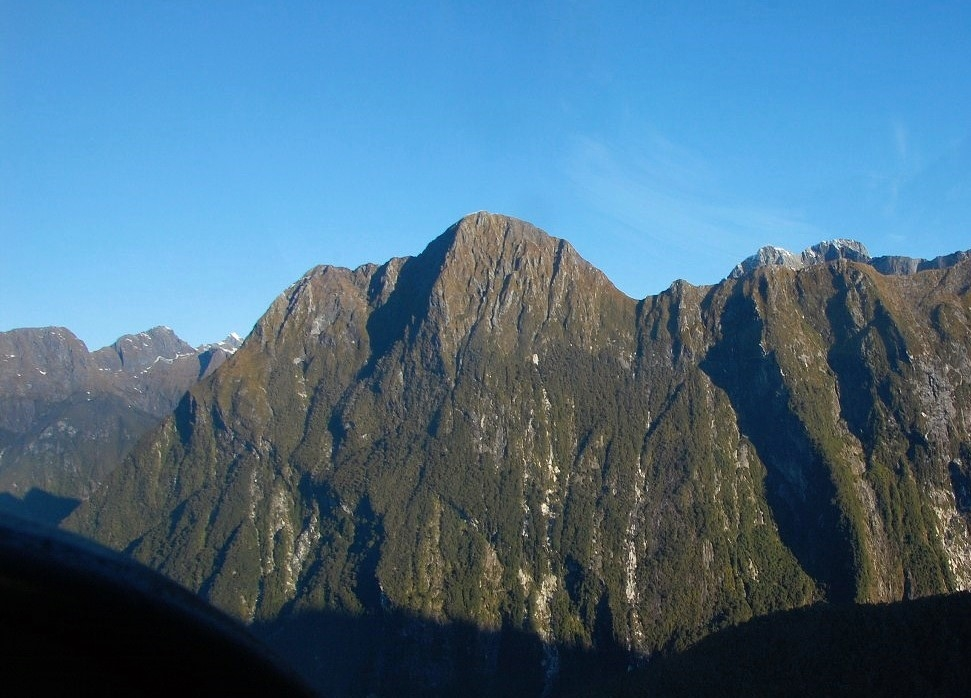
Aerial view of north aspect
