= Tête Jaune =

Hudson's Bay Company guide and fur trapper

Pierre Bostonais or Pierre Hastination (died 1828), better known as Tête Jaune, was a Haudenosaunee (Iroquois)-Métis trapper, fur trader, and explorer who worked for the North West Company and Hudson's Bay Company during the 18th and 19th centuries. His nickname means 'yellow head' in English and was given to him because of his blond hair. The name Bostonais (French for 'Boston man') refers to his probable American origin: First Nations people applied that name to American traders.

In the early 19th century, Pierre crossed the Rocky Mountains by the pass that would later bear his name. He led a brigade of Hudson's Bay men through the same pass in December 1819 to encounter the Secwepemc people. Pierre would later move his cache from the Grand Fork of the Fraser River to a Secwepemc fishing village on the Fraser. He and his family were killed by members of the Dane-zaa in 1828 near the headwaters of the Smoky River, in retaliation for Haudenosaunee encroachment into Dane-zaa territory.

== Legacy ==
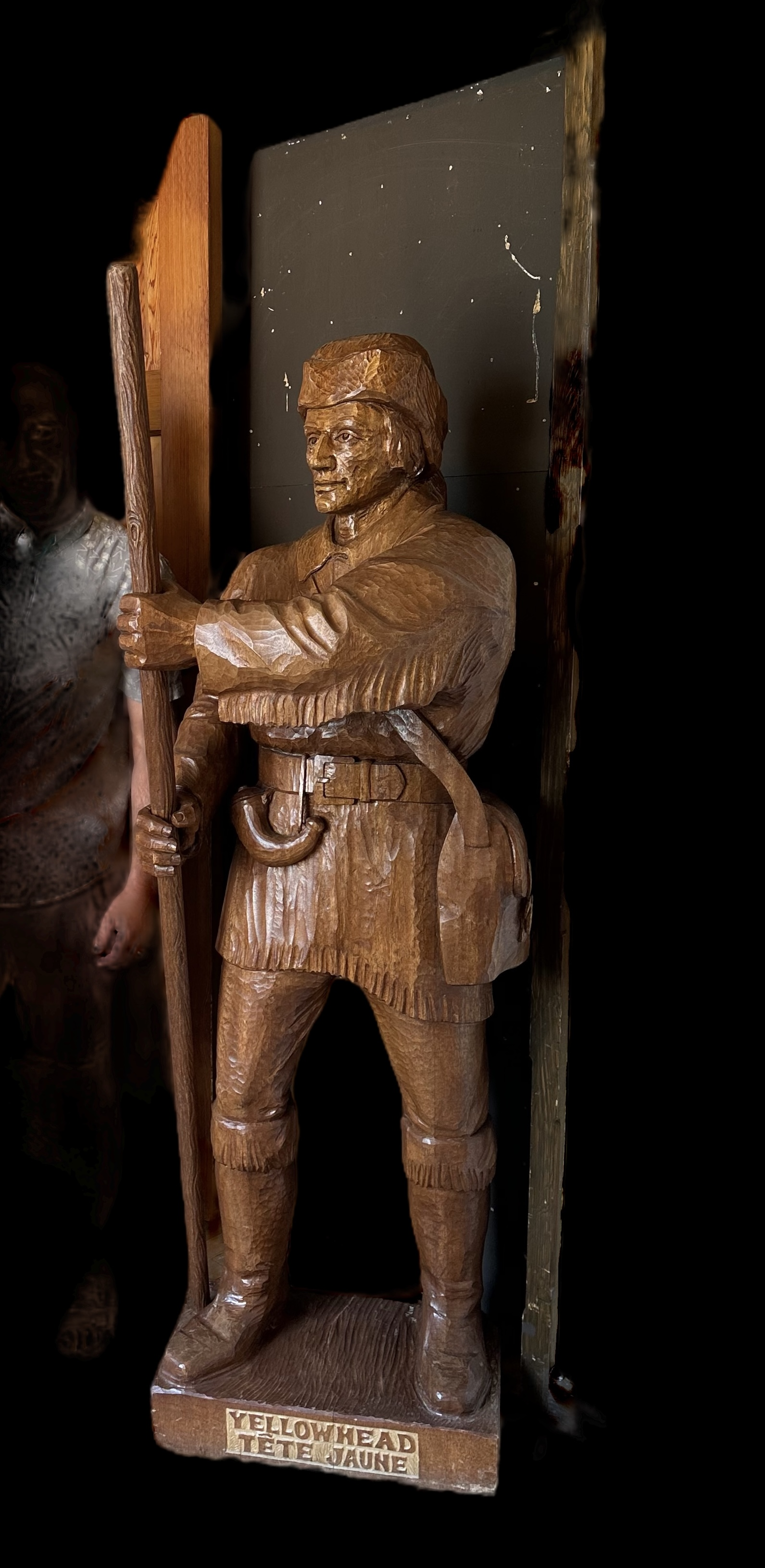
Tete Jaune Yellowhead Sculpture by Paul Van Imschoot

Places named after Tête Jaune:

- Tête Jaune Cache, British Columbia
- Yellowhead Highway
- Yellowhead Pass, in Jasper National Park, Alberta

Canadian writer Howard O'Hagan (1902-1982) published the novel Tay John (1939), named from an Anglicized form of Tête Jaune. The narrative is a mixture of frontier myths, Indigenous tales and the history of Jasper National Park in Alberta. The novel was reprinted in 1960, 1974 and 1989 and became popular in Canadian literature courses across Canada.

== See also ==
- Yellowhead (disambiguation)
