= Arctomys Cave =

Cave in British Columbia, Canada

- Location within British Columbia
- Location: Mount Robson Provincial Park; British Columbia, Canada
- Coordinates: 53°04′05″N 118°53′56″W
- Depth: 536 metres (1,759 ft)
- Discovery: 1911
- Geology: Limestone, flowstone, soda straws
- Hazards: Sumps

Arctomys Cave is a cave in Trio Mountain above the Moose River Valley in Mount Robson Provincial Park in the Rocky Mountains of British Columbia. Arctomys Cave has 3,496 metres of surveyed passages and has a maximum depth of 536 metres (1,759 ft).

== Exploration ==
Arctomys Cave was discovered in 1911, and first reported in the Canadian Alpine Journal in 1912 by mountaineer A.O. Wheeler who, accompanied by Conrad Kain, Byron Harmon George Kinney and 'Curly' Phillips, had descended to a waterfall at a depth of about 80 metres, stating that: "Beyond that the going is wet and the exploration was not carried further, as there was no change in the character of the subterranean shaft." There is no record of subsequent visitation until 1971 - 1973 when cavers from the McMaster University Climbing and Caving Club, Guelph University Caving Club, Alberta Speleological Society and some visiting British cavers explored and surveyed the cave to its maximum depth of -522 metres. Passages above the entrance were surveyed by British and Canadian cavers in 1983 resulting in the current vertical range of 536 metres. Arctomys Cave was the deepest known cave in Canada for many years, until surpassed by Heavy Breather in 2010 at 653m and then by Bisaro Anima in 2017 with its depth of 670 metres (2,198 ft).

== Characteristics ==
Arctomys Cave is formed in the steeply-dipping Mural Formation limestone of the Early Cambrian Gog Group. The top half of the cave (The Endless Climb) descends relatively steeply, but at a depth of about 400 metres the cave becomes more horizontal with several pools, and ends at a sump. Despite its great depth, the cave includes only five pitches up to 15m deep. Although most of the cave is undecorated, the Straw Gallery has flowstone and relatively long soda straws.

== Accident in 1991 ==
Arctomys Cave is the site of Canada's most extensive cave rescue attempt. On October 17, 1991, Rick Blak, an experienced caver and park ranger at Mount Robson Provincial Park, was struck and killed by a falling boulder deep in the cave. 44 people were involved in the complex recovery of his body.

== See also ==
- List of caves in Canada
- Arctomys Falls
