= Yellow Head, Maine =

Location in Maine, U.S.

Coordinates: 43°51′27″N 69°29′36″W

Yellow Head is a marine navigational coastal location, often sited in maps, within Lincoln County, in the U.S. State of Maine (1). It is located on Pemaquid peninsula, 1.1 m south of New Harbor, Maine and north of Pemaquid Lighthouse. It is privately owned and not accessible to the public.
