= Odyssey Peak =

Mountain in Fiordland, New Zealand

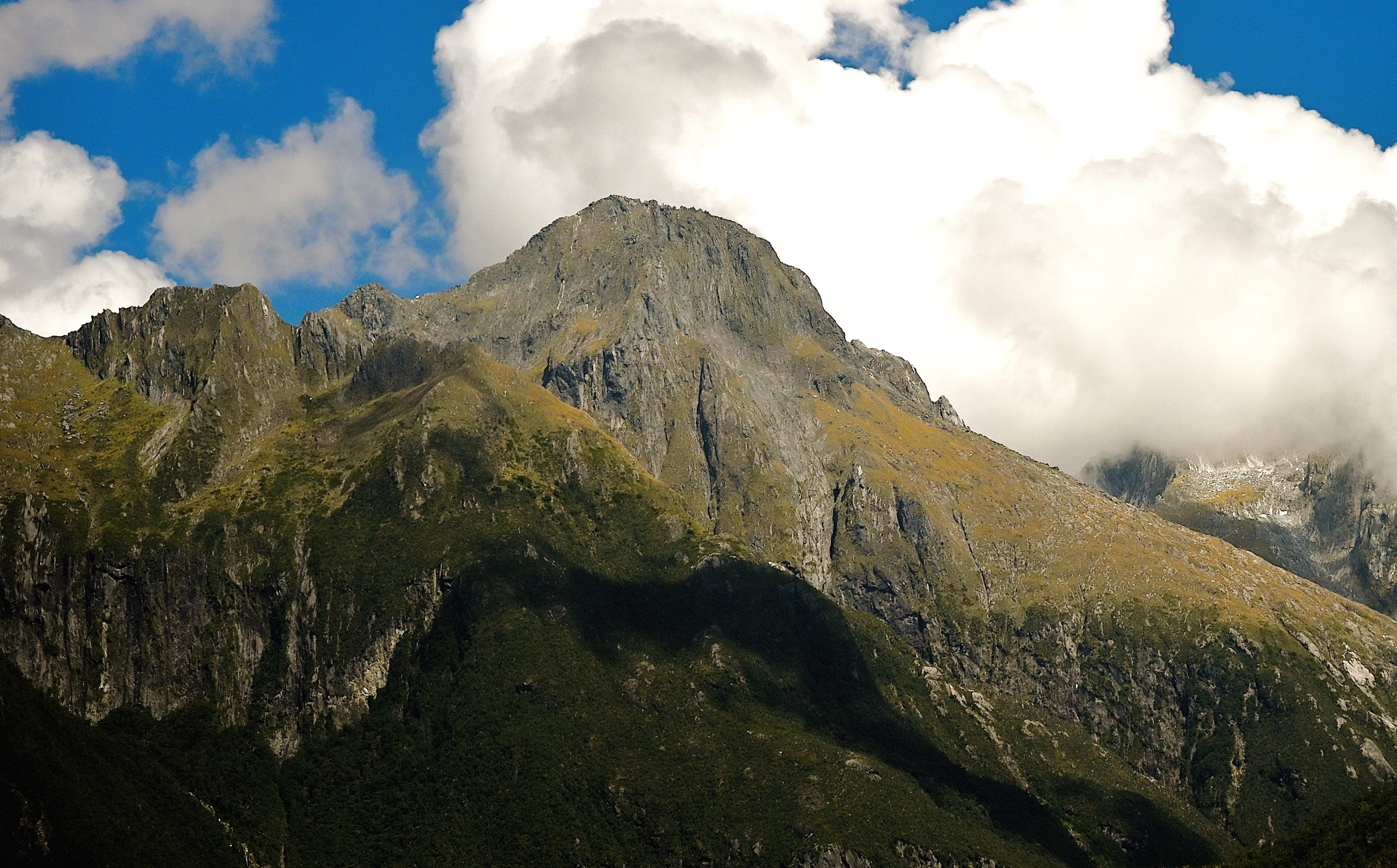
- North aspect

Highest point
- Elevation: 1,821 m (5,974 ft)
- Prominence: 290 m (951 ft)
- Isolation: 1.75 km (1.09 mi)
- Coordinates: 44°42′56″S 167°53′54″E

Naming
- Etymology: Odyssey

Geography
- Location within New Zealand
- Interactive map of Odyssey Peak
- Location: South Island
- Country: New Zealand
- Region: Southland
- Protected area: Fiordland National Park
- Parent range: Wick Mountains
- Topo map(s): NZMS260 D40; Topo50 CB08

Geology
- Rock age: 136 ± 1.9 Ma
- Rock type(s): Gabbronorite, dioritic orthogneiss

Climbing
- First ascent: January 1961

Odyssey Peak is an 1,821-metre-elevation (5,974-foot) mountain in Fiordland, New Zealand.

== Description ==
Odyssey Peak is part of the Sheerdown Hills in the Wick Mountains, where it is situated five kilometres south of Milford Sound in the Southland Region of the South Island. It is located within Fiordland National Park which is part of the Te Wahipounamu UNESCO World Heritage Site. Precipitation runoff from the mountain's west slope drains into Lake Ada and the Arthur River, whereas the east slope drains into the Cleddau River. Topographic relief is significant as the summit rises 1,778 metres (5,833 feet) above Lake Ada in two kilometres, and 1,200 metres (3,937 feet) above the West Branch Cleddau Valley in one kilometre. The nearest higher neighbour is Mount Ada, 1.75 kilometre to the southwest. The mountain's toponym was applied by Noel Dunlop, who led the first ascent of the summit in 1961, as he bestowed the name both as a description of the climb and in association with the nearby Homer Saddle, which was not however named for Homer, the author of the Odyssey.

== Climbing ==
The first ascent of the summit was made in January 1961 by Noel Dunlop, Chris Gee, and B. McNaughton.

Climbing routes with the first ascents:

- West Buttress – Noel Dunlop, Chris Gee, B. McNaughton – (1961)
- South East Buttress – Merv English, Murray Jones – (1977)
- North East Ridge (descent) – Merv English, Murray Jones – (1977)

== Climate ==
Based on the Köppen climate classification, Odyssey Peak is located in a marine west coast climate zone. Prevailing westerly winds blow moist air from the Tasman Sea onto the mountains, where the air is forced upward by the mountains (orographic lift), causing moisture to drop in the form of rain or snow. The months of December through February offer the most favourable weather for viewing or climbing this peak.

== Gallery ==
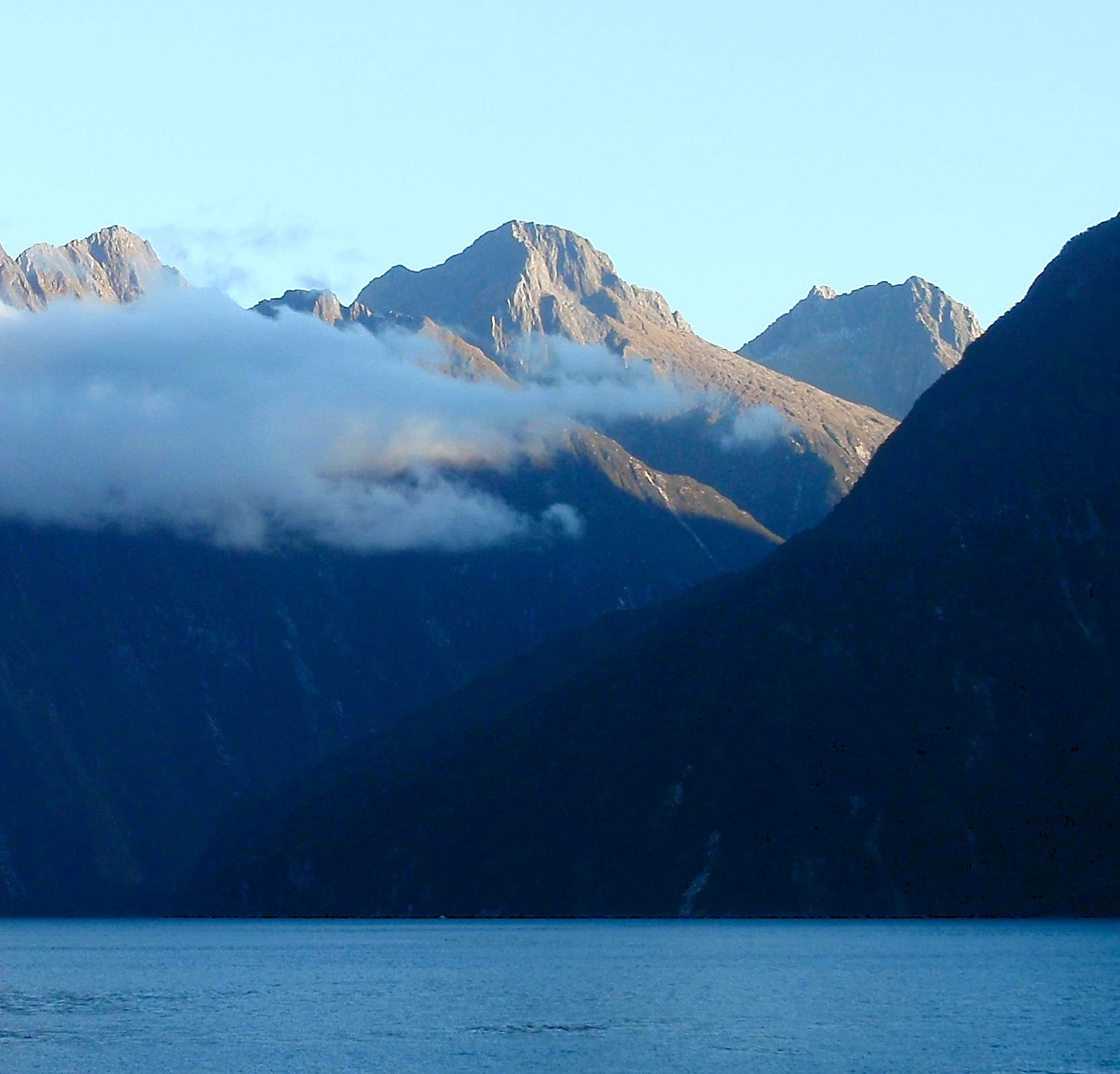
Odyssey Peak (centred) viewed from Milford Sound, with Mount Ada (behind, right)

== See also ==
- List of mountains of New Zealand by height
