= Yellowhead Pass =

Mountain pass on the Alberta/British Columbia border

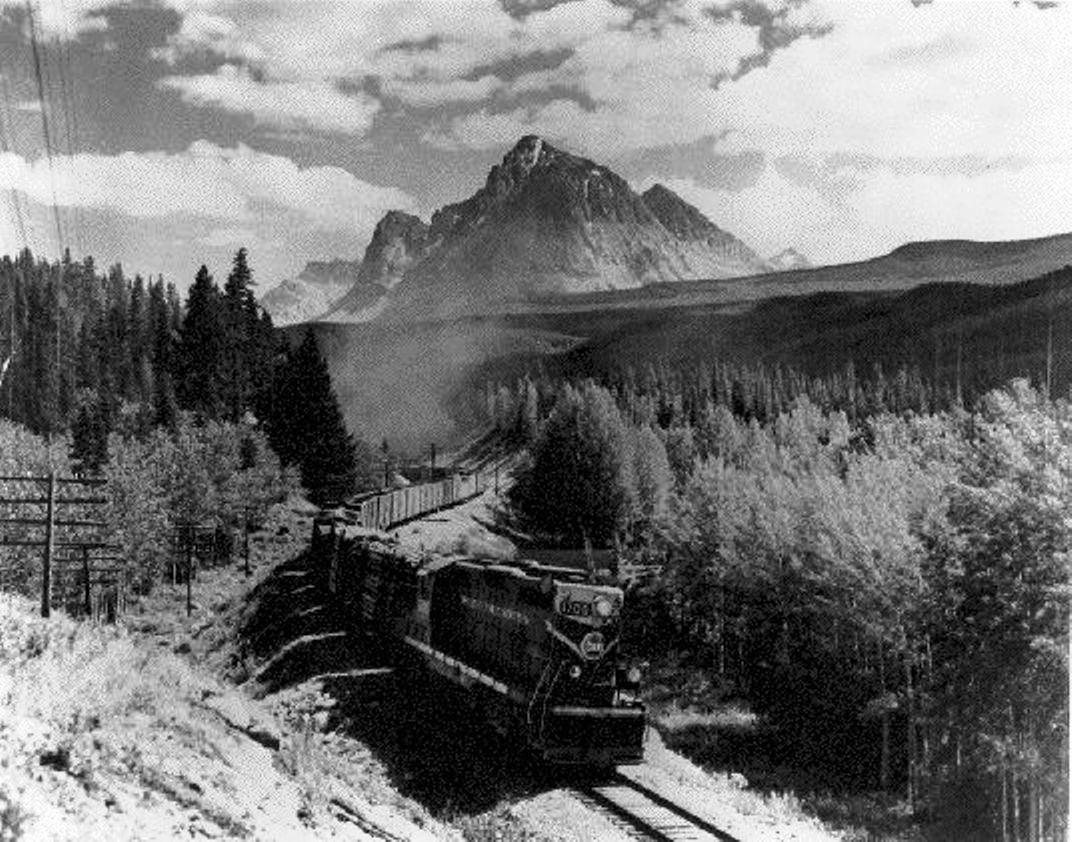
- CNR GP9 in the Yellowhead Pass
- Interactive map of Yellowhead Pass
- 52°53′33″N 118°27′50″W
- Location: Alberta, British Columbia, Canada

History
- Founder: Canadian Northern Railway; Grand Trunk Pacific Railway
- Original use: Mountain pass

Site notes
- Elevation: 1,131 m (3,711 ft)
- Governing body: Parks Canada

National Historic Site of Canada

Yellowhead Pass
- Interactive map of Yellowhead Pass
- Elevation: 1,131 m (3,711 ft)
- Traversed by: Yellowhead Highway and Canadian National Railway; Via Rail's Canadian, Via's Jasper – Prince Rupert train and the Jasper section of the Rocky Mountaineer using CN tracks

Location
- Location: Jasper National Park, Alberta / Mount Robson Provincial Park, British Columbia, Canada
- Range: Canadian Rockies
- Topo map: NTS 83D16 Jasper

Yellowhead Pass in British Columbia

The Yellowhead Pass is a mountain pass across the Continental Divide of the Americas in the Canadian Rockies. It is on the provincial boundary between the Canadian provinces of Alberta and British Columbia, and on the border between Jasper National Park and Mount Robson Provincial Park.

West of the pass is Yellowhead Lake, which drains into the nearby Fraser River. The Miette River, a tributary of the Athabasca River, flows just to the east of the pass.

== History ==
It is believed that the pass was named for Pierre Bostonais (nicknamed Tête Jaune, French for "yellow head", because of his blond hair), an Iroquois-Métis trapper employed as a guide by the Hudson's Bay Company. Bostonais led one of the first expeditions for the company into what is now the interior of British Columbia through the pass in 1820.

Topological map of the proposed, never-built Canadian Pacific Railway line from East Selkirk to Kamloops, passing through the Yellowhead Pass.

Due to its modest elevation of 1,131 m (3,711 ft) and its gradual approaches, the pass was recommended by Sir Sandford Fleming as a route across the Rocky Mountains for the planned Canadian Pacific Railway. The proposal was rejected in favour of a more direct and southerly route, through the more difficult Kicking Horse Pass, which was opened in 1886. Later the Grand Trunk Pacific and Canadian Northern Railway used the Yellowhead Pass for their main lines, built c. 1910–1913. The main line of their successor, the Canadian National Railway, still follows the route. Via Rail's passenger trains, the Canadian and the Jasper – Prince Rupert train use the Yellowhead Pass, as well as the Jasper section of the Rocky Mountaineer. The Yellowhead Highway also passes through the Yellowhead Pass.

The Yellowhead Pass was explored by fur-trading companies in 1810, and in 1813 Jasper House was established by the North West Company, as the route became well used to access furs in interior BC. In spring 1814 Gabriel Franchere, accompanying a Bay-bound fur brigade, departed from Fort George (formerly Fort Astoria) at the mouth of the Columbia River and arrived at Jasper House from the west. At that time, Jasper House was located on the west side of the Athabasca River on Brule Lake.

== See also ==
- List of railroad crossings of the North American continental divide
- List of Rocky Mountain passes on the continental divide
- List of mountain passes
