= Kinney Lake =

Lake in British Columbia, Canada

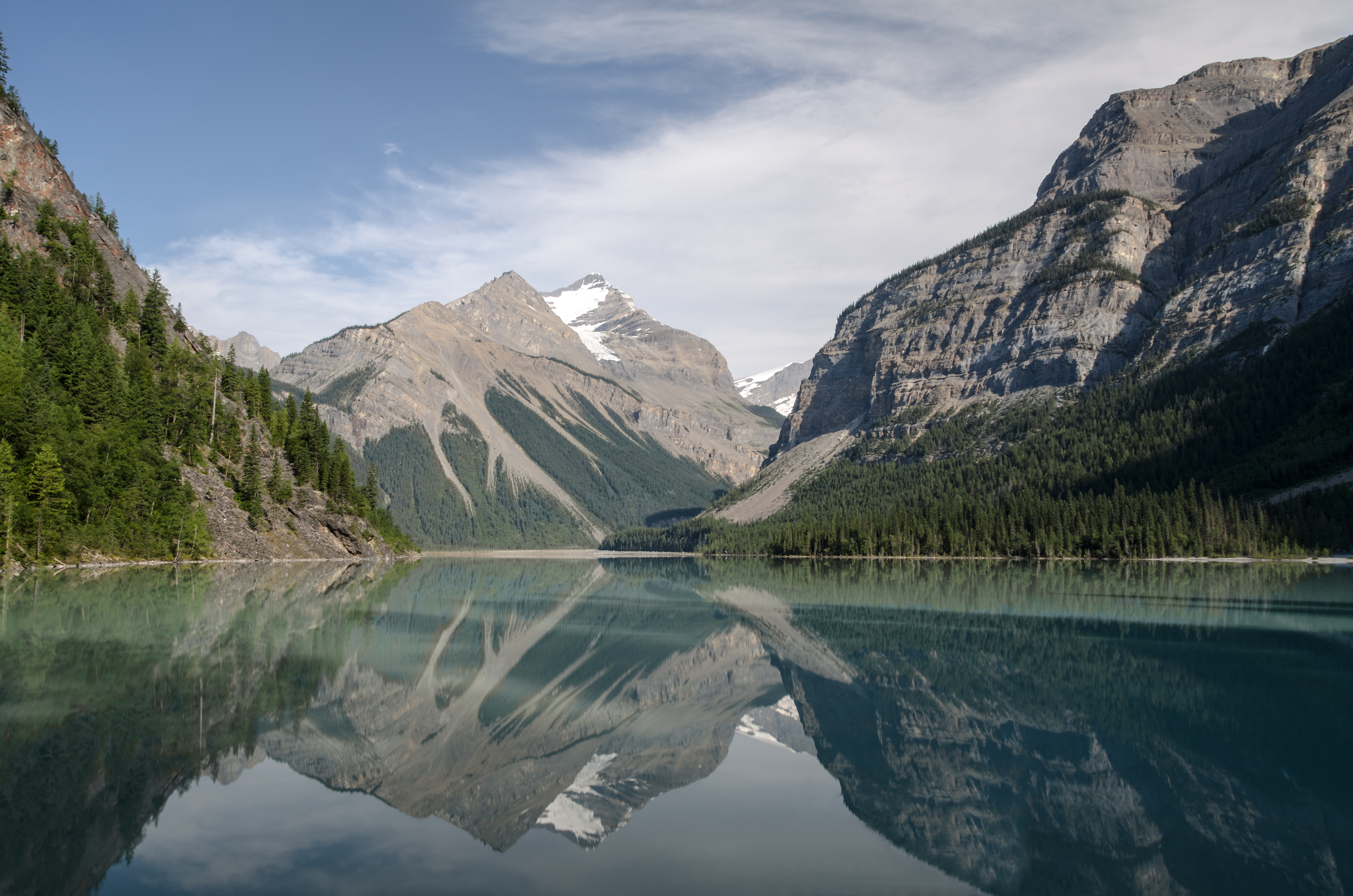

- Location within Canada
- Interactive map of Kinney Lake
- Location: Mount Robson Provincial Park, British Columbia
- Coordinates: 53°04′56″N 119°11′34″W
- Primary inflows: Robson River
- Primary outflows: Robson River
- Basin countries: Canada

Kinney Lake is a lake located in Mount Robson Provincial Park of British Columbia, Canada. The lake can be reached by following the Berg Lake Trail for 4.2 kilometres (2.6 mi). The lake is an expansion of the Robson River (a tributary of the upper Fraser River) and is located about halfway between the river's source and its mouth. It was named by Arthur Philemon Coleman, Canadian geologist, who explored the region with his friend, George Kinney, who spotted the lake first.

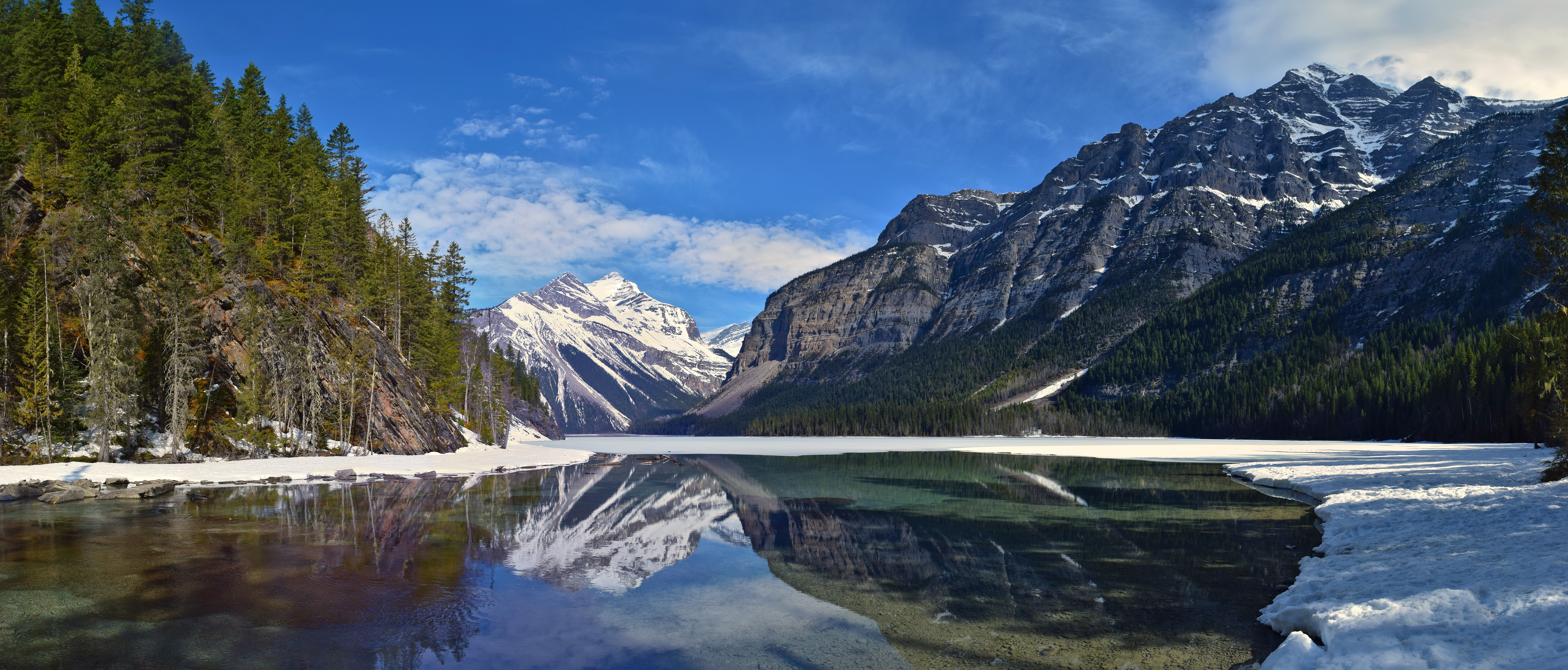
The lake in April 2021

== Kinney Lake ==
- List of lakes of British Columbia
