= Robson River =

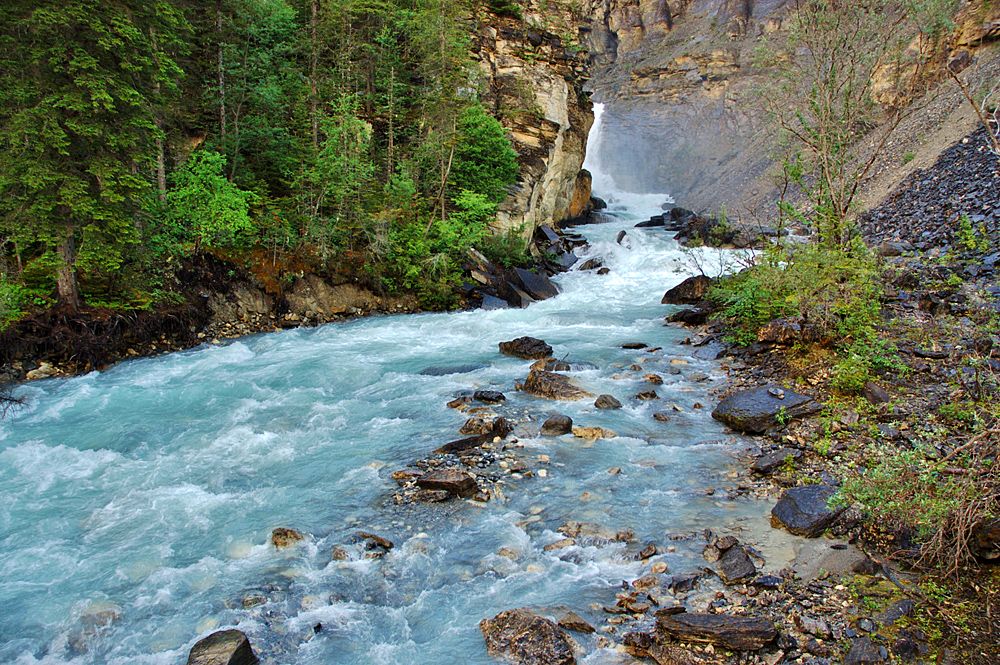
- Robson River above Whitehorn campground

Location
- Country: Canada
- Province: British Columbia
- District: Cariboo Land District

Physical characteristics
- Source: Robson Lake
  - location: Mount Robson Provincial Park
  - coordinates: 53°09′16″N 119°07′09″W
  - elevation: 5,489 ft (1,673 m)
- Mouth: Fraser River
  - location: Mount Robson Provincial Park
  - coordinates: 53°01′37″N 119°15′29″W
  - elevation: 2,637 ft (804 m)

The Robson River is a short but swift, rapid and waterfall-infested river in Mount Robson Provincial Park of British Columbia. It is a tributary of the Upper Fraser River and originates near Robson Pass, which divides the Robson River from the headwaters of the Smoky River drainage. There are three lakes along the river's course as well as four waterfalls.

== Course ==
=== Robson Lake to Berg Lake ===
The Robson River begins in Robson Lake, which is located at the toe of the Robson Glacier. After exiting the lake, the river flows northwest then southwest before entering Berg Lake. Before entering Berg Lake, the river widens and splits into many small streams that flow into the lake's northeast end.

=== Berg Lake to Kinney Lake ===
The river exits the southwest end and flows west for about 2.3 kilometres (1.4 mi) until dropping over spectacular Emperor Falls, a 46 metres (150 ft) plunge at the head of a 1.6-kilometre (1.0 mi) canyon in which the river thunders over two more waterfalls. The first is Falls of the Pool, located about halfway down the gorge. At the end of the canyon is White Falls, a multi-tiered waterfall that cannot be seen in its entirety from the main trail. All these falls are collectively known as the Valley of a Thousand Falls. The river continues south from White Falls for another 3.3 kilometres (2.1 mi) before entering Kinney Lake, which sits directly at the base of the Robson River's namesake peak, Mount Robson. Between Berg and Kinney Lakes, the river loses 666 metres (2,185 ft) of elevation, much of which is lost in the gorge between Emperor and White Falls. Once again, prior to entering another lake, this time Kinney, the river spreads out very wide & divides into many braids before flowing into the lake.

=== Kinney Lake to the Fraser River ===
The Robson exits Kinney Lake at its south end and flows southwest for about 7.3 kilometres (4.5 mi) to its confluence with the Fraser, about 3.5 kilometres (2.2 mi) below Overlander Falls and about 1.7 kilometres (1.1 mi) above the mouth of Swiftcurrent Creek. About halfway between Kinney Lake & the Fraser is Knowlton Falls, the first waterfall seen on the Berg Lake Trail. About 0.6 kilometres (0.4 mi) above the Fraser, the Yellowhead Highway crosses the river.

In total, the river loses 869 metres (2,852 ft) of elevation between Robson Lake and the Fraser River, three-quarters of which is lost between Berg and Kinney Lakes.

== Hiking ==
The main hiking trail in the area is the Berg Lake Trail, which begins at the Yellowhead Highway near the mouth of the Robson. It goes all the way to its namesake lake, where the trail splits into more trails. Reaching Berg Lake is usually a multi-day trip. However, it is possible and it is done in a single day by some.

Another nearby hiking destination more suitable for a shorter trip is Kinney Lake. Bikes are permitted at Kinney Lake, making it easily accessible. There is a bike lock-up part-way down the shore, from which people continuing further upriver have to proceed by foot.

The Berg Lake trail also gives hikers looks at the Robson's waterfalls. Knowlton Falls is seen about halfway between the trailhead and Kinney Lake while hikers can stare into the canyon at White Falls and Falls of the Pool as the trail climbs toward Berg Lake.

== See also ==
- List of rivers of British Columbia
