= Berg Lake =

Lake in British Columbia, Canada

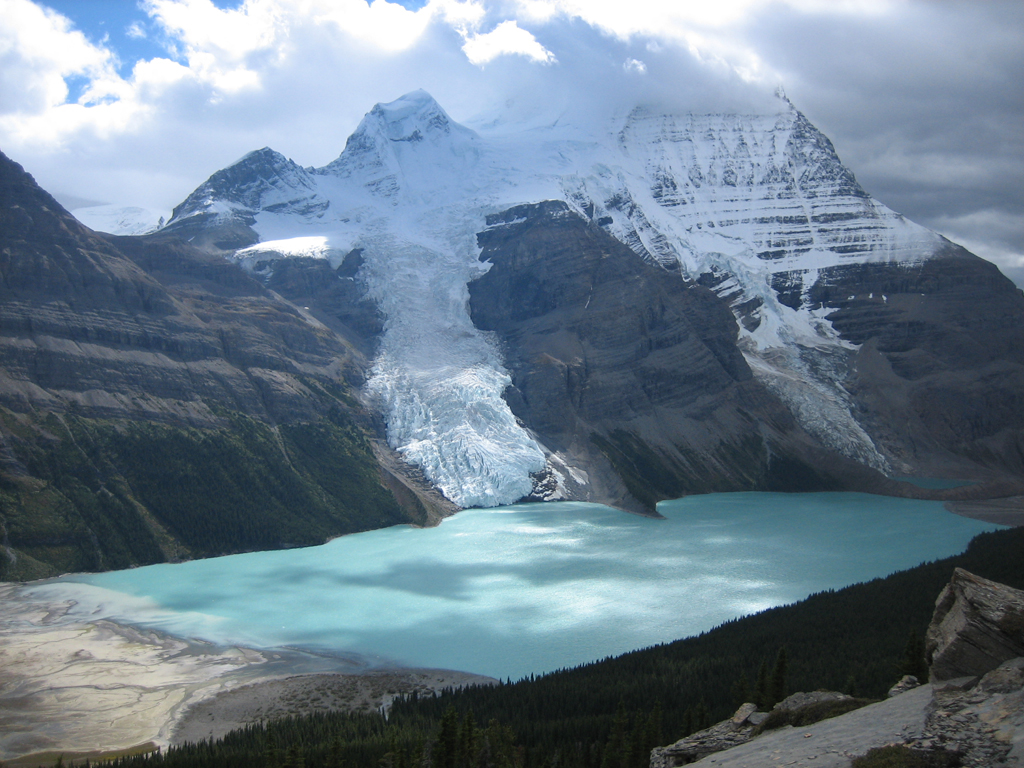
- Berg Lake as viewed from the Mumm Basin

- Location within British Columbia
- Location: Mount Robson Provincial Park, British Columbia
- Coordinates: 53°8′44″N 119°9′28″W
- Primary inflows: Robson River, Toboggan Creek, Hargreaves Lake Outlet Stream,
- Primary outflows: Robson River
- Basin countries: Canada
- Surface elevation: 1,646 m (5,400 ft)
- Settlements: None

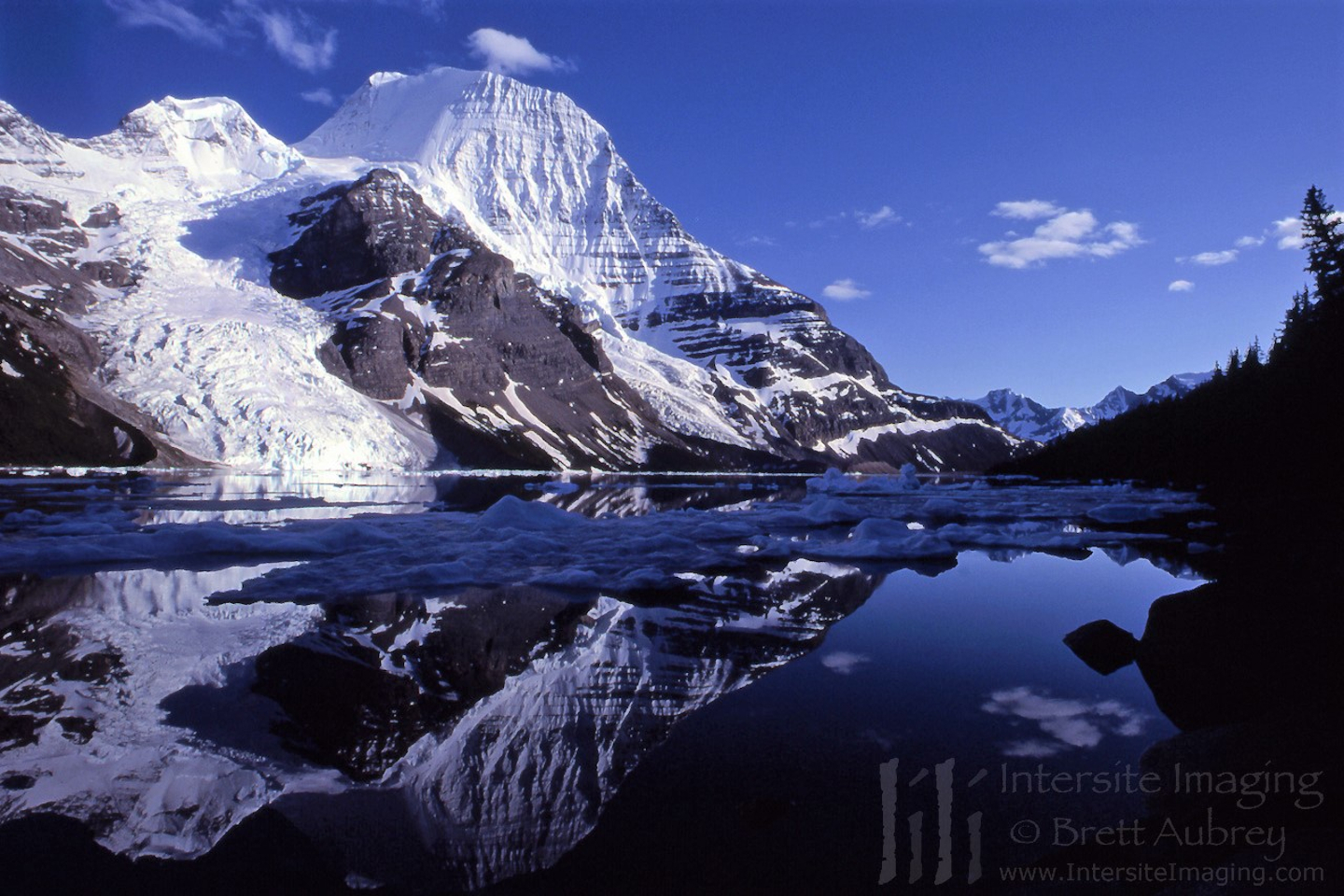
Berg Lake (with bergs) and Mt. Robson

Berg Lake is a lake on the Robson River just below the river's source located within Mount Robson Provincial Park, at the doorstep of the north face of Mount Robson, the highest peak in the Canadian Rockies. It is partly fed by the Berg Glacier.

The turquoise-coloured Berg Lake is dotted with icebergs even in the middle of summer. Berg Lake can be reached by following a marked hiking trail for 19 kilometres (12 mi) from the parking lot. To reach the parking lot, follow Highway 5 north from Valemount to Highway 16 and head east 18 kilometres (11 mi). Or, follow Yellowhead Highway 16 west from Jasper townsite for 84 kilometres (52 mi) to the Mount Robson Viewpoint centre. On the north side of the highway, follow a two-lane paved road for 2 kilometres (1.2 mi), ending at the parking lot.

== Berg Lake Trail ==
The trail climbs gradually alongside the Robson River (a tributary of the Fraser River) for 4.2 kilometres (2.6 mi) before reaching Kinney Lake. After crossing a steel bridge at the end of Kinney Lake, it is just 2.8 kilometres (1.7 mi) to the Kinney Lake campground. After leaving the Kinney Lake campground the trail climbs and then descends a small bluff. After descending the bluff the trail splits for less than a kilometre, giving the hiker the option of traversing the flats, which is not recommended in the early summer because of high water, or continuing on in the forest. At the end of the Kinney Lake flats the trail starts climbing up to the Valley of a Thousand Falls. After several kilometres the trail crosses the Robson River on a suspension bridge and enters Whitehorn campground at the 11 kilometres (6.8 mi) mark. After leaving the campground the trail eventually crosses a second steel bridge. At this point the trail starts a steep climb with numerous switchbacks. Over the next few kilometres, the trail passes White Falls, Falls-of-the-Pool and Emperor Falls. Finally, once above this valley, the trail levels off and dips down toward the river, providing the first glimpses of the Emperor Face of Mt. Robson. After climbing just over 500 metres (1,600 ft) in 5 kilometres (3.1 mi), the trail enters Emperor campground. From here the trail continues on 3 kilometres (1.9 mi) until reaching the shores of Berg Lake and Marmot campground. If you carry on a further 2 kilometres (1.2 mi) you will reach Berg Lake campground. There are three popular day trips from this campground, Hargeaves Glacier/Mumm Basin Traverse, Toboggan Falls and Snowbird Pass. At the 22 kilometres (14 mi) mark and 23 kilometres (14 mi) mark there are two more campgrounds, Rearguard and Robson Pass.

== See also ==
- List of lakes of British Columbia

== Sources ==
- The Canadian Rockies Trail Guide
- K. Copeland, C. Copeland (2004). Don't Waste Your Time in the Canadian Rockies. Hikingcamping.com. ISBN 0-9689419-7-4
