= Mount Robson Provincial Park =

Provincial park in British Columbia, Canada

- IUCN category II (national park)
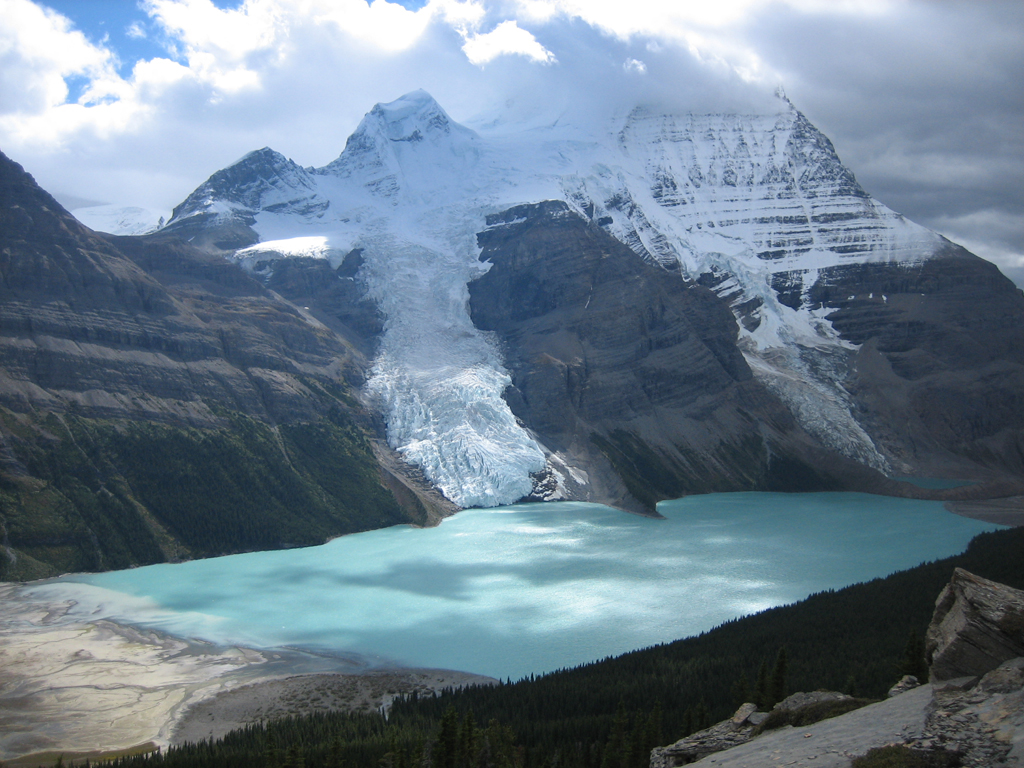
- Mt. Robson's north face, Berg and Mist glaciers calving into Berg Lake

- Location within British Columbia
- Interactive map of Mount Robson Provincial Park
- Location: British Columbia, Canada
- Nearest city: Valemount, Jasper
- Coordinates: 53°02′02″N 119°13′54″W
- Area: 2,249 km^{2} (868 sq mi)
- Established: 1913
- Governing body: BC Parks
- Website: bcparks.ca/explore/parkpgs/mt_robson/

UNESCO World Heritage Site
- Part of: Canadian Rocky Mountain Parks
- Criteria: Natural: (vii), (viii)
- Reference: 304
- Inscription: 1990 (14th Session)

Mount Robson Provincial Park in the Canadian Rockies has an area of 2,249 km^{2}. The park is located entirely within British Columbia, bordering Jasper National Park in Alberta. The B.C. Legislature created the park in 1913, the same year as the first ascent of Mount Robson by a party led by Conrad Kain. It is the second-oldest park in the provincial system. The park is named for Mount Robson, which has the highest point in the Canadian Rockies and is located entirely within the park.

== History ==
The first recreational trail was built in 1913 by Jasper outfitter Donald "Curly" Phillips along the Robson River to Berg Lake.

From May to September, the Mount Robson Visitor Information Centre is open to the public, and is a common stop on the Yellowhead Highway. The only commercial services within the park are at a combination coffee-shop gas station complex at the same viewpoint. There are two government campgrounds near the Visitor Centre and one near Yellowhead Pass.

== Geography ==
The park spans the Yellowhead Highway and is 390 kilometres west of Edmonton and 290 kilometres east of Prince George.

The source of the Fraser River is in Mount Robson Provincial Park. A dripping spring just west of a pond at Fraser Pass is the actual source of British Columbia's longest river. It is 40 km (25 mi) south of the Yellowhead Highway at Lucerne Campground. There are no trails there and the best access is by helicopter from Valemount.

=== Notable features ===
Notable natural features found in the park include:

- Arctomys Cave
- Berg Lake
- Kinney Lake
- Yellowhead Lake

== World heritage site ==
In 1990 Mount Robson Park was included within the Canadian Rocky Mountain Parks UNESCO World Heritage Site. Together with the other national and provincial parks that comprise the Canadian Rocky Mountain Parks, the park was recognized for its natural beauty and the geological and ecological significance of its mountain landscapes containing the habitats of rare and endangered species, mountain peaks, glaciers, lakes, waterfalls, canyons, limestone caves and fossils.

== See also ==
- List of British Columbia Provincial Parks
- List of World Heritage Sites in Canada
