= Crowsnest Range =

Mountain range in Alberta/British Columbia

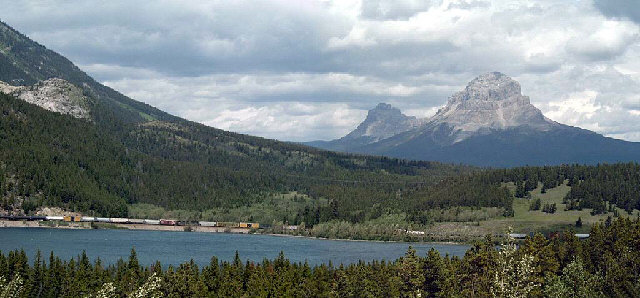
- Crownsnest Mountain and Seven Sisters Mountain in the Crowsnest Range

Highest point
- Peak: Mount Ptolemy
- Elevation: 2,812 m (9,226 ft)
- Coordinates: 49°32′53.9″N 114°37′54.1″W

Dimensions
- Length: 64 km (40 mi) N-S
- Width: 104 km (65 mi)

Geography
- Location within Alberta
- Country: Canada
- Provinces: British Columbia and Alberta
- Parent range: Continental Ranges
- Borders on: High Rock Range

Crowsnest Range is a mountain range of the Rocky Mountains in southwestern Alberta and southeastern British Columbia, Canada.

The range is located south of the Crowsnest Pass, which separates it from the High Rock Range. It is part of the Southern Continental Ranges of the Canadian Rockies. Sub-ranges include, from north to south, Lizard Range, Taylor Range, Flathead Range and Blairmore Range.

The Crowsnest Range covers a surface of 2,694 km^{2} (1,040 mi^{2}), has a length of 64 km (from north to south) and a width of 104 km (65 mi). The highest peak is Mount Ptolemy, with an elevation of 2,812 m (9,226 ft).

== Peaks and Mountains ==
1. Mount Ptolemy - 2,812 m (9,226 ft)
2. Crowsnest Mountain - 2,785 m (9,137 ft)
3. Seven Sisters Mountain - 2,591 m (8,501 ft)

== See also ==
- Ranges of the Canadian Rockies
