= Lynx Mountain =

Mountain in Alberta and British Columbia, Canada

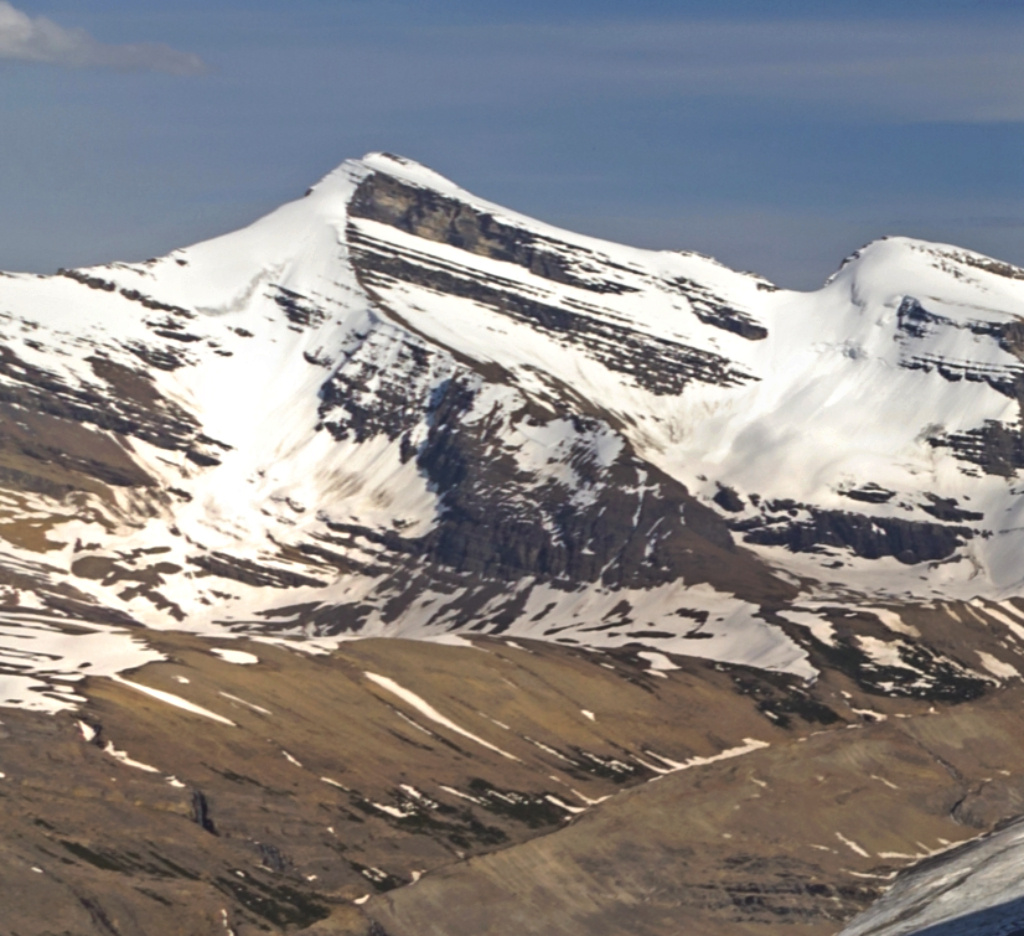

Highest point
- Elevation: 3,192 m (10,472 ft)
- Prominence: 440 m (1,440 ft)
- Parent peak: Resplendent Mountain (3425 m)
- Listing: Mountains of Alberta; Mountains of British Columbia
- Coordinates: 53°07′35″N 119°02′53″W

Geography
- Location within Alberta Location within British Columbia Location within Canada
- Country: Canada
- Provinces: Alberta and British Columbia
- Protected areas: Jasper National Park; Mount Robson Provincial Park
- Parent range: Rainbow Range
- Topo map: NTS 83E3 Mount Robson

Climbing
- First ascent: 1913 ACC Party, W. Schauffelberger

Lynx Mountain is a mountain peak in the Canadian Rockies. It is located on the Continental Divide between the provinces of Alberta and British Columbia, in the Cushina Ridge of the Continental Ranges. It was named by Lucius Quincy Coleman for the remains of a lynx they found on the ice of the nearby Coleman Glacier in 1908.

Reaching an elevation of 3,192 metres (10,472 ft), it lies in both the Mount Robson Provincial Park and Jasper National Park.

The Lynx Formation, a stratigraphic unit of the Western Canada Sedimentary Basin, was named for the mountain by Charles Doolittle Walcott in 1913.

== See also ==
- List of peaks on the Alberta–British Columbia border
- List of mountains in the Canadian Rockies
