= Extinguisher Tower =

Mountain in British Columbia, Canada

- Location within British Columbia Location within Canada
- Interactive map of Extinguisher Tower

Highest point
- Elevation: 2,433 m (7,982 ft) (Note: Other sources state 2393 m.)
- Prominence: 48 m (157 ft)
- Parent peak: Mount Robson (3954 m)
- Listing: Mountains of British Columbia
- Coordinates: 53°07′10″N 119°05′44″W

Geography
- Country: Canada
- Province: British Columbia
- District: Cariboo Land District
- Protected area: Mount Robson Provincial Park
- Parent range: Rainbow Range; Canadian Rockies
- Topo map: NTS 83E3 Mount Robson

Extinguisher Tower is a mountain on the SE side of Robson Glacier, SE of Berg Lake at the northern end of Mount Robson Provincial Park in British Columbia, Canada. It is part of the Rainbow Range which is a sub-range of the Canadian Rockies.

== See also ==
- Geography of British Columbia
