= Rearguard Mountain =

Mountain in British Columbia, Canada

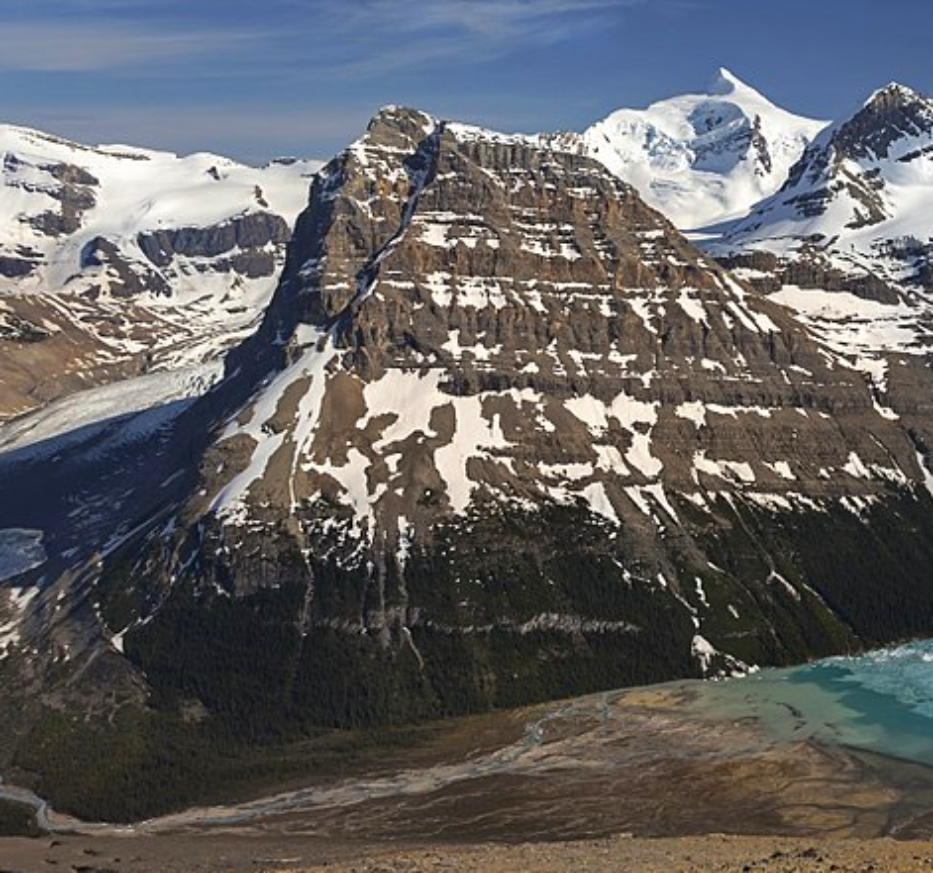
- Rearguard Mountain

Highest point
- Elevation: 2,744 m (9,003 ft)
- Prominence: 454 m (1,490 ft)
- Parent peak: Mount Robson (3959 m)
- Listing: Mountains of British Columbia
- Coordinates: 53°08′38″N 119°07′35″W

Geography
- Location within British Columbia Location within Canada
- Interactive map of Rearguard Mountain
- Location: British Columbia, Canada
- District: Cariboo Land District
- Parent range: Rainbow Range; Canadian Rockies
- Topo map: NTS 83E3 Mount Robson

Geology
- Rock age: Cambrian
- Rock type: sedimentary rock

Climbing
- First ascent: 1913 Alpine Club of Canada party
- Easiest route: Glacier travel and scrambling scree

Rearguard Mountain is a 2,744-metre (9,003-foot) summit located within Mount Robson Provincial Park in British Columbia, Canada. It is part of the Rainbow Range which is a sub-range of the Canadian Rockies. Its nearest higher peak is Mount Robson, 4.0 km (2.5 mi) to the southwest. Rearguard is situated between Berg Lake and the Robson Glacier.

== History ==
It was named in 1922 by the Interprovincial Boundary Survey to describe the point of view of those approaching Mount Robson since the mountain is located at the rear of Robson.

The mountain's name was officially adopted February 1, 1923, by the Geographical Names Board of Canada. It was labelled on Arthur O. Wheeler's 1911 topographic map of Mount Robson.

The first ascent was made in 1913 by an Alpine Club of Canada party.

== Climate ==
Based on the Köppen climate classification, Rearguard Mountain is located in a subarctic climate zone with cold, snowy winters, and mild summers. Winter temperatures can drop below −20 °C with wind chill factors below −30 °C. The months June through September offer the most favorable weather to visit. Precipitation runoff from the mountain drains into the Robson River.

== Geology ==
The mountain is composed of sedimentary rock laid down during the Precambrian to Jurassic periods and pushed east and over the top of younger rock during the Laramide orogeny.

== Gallery ==
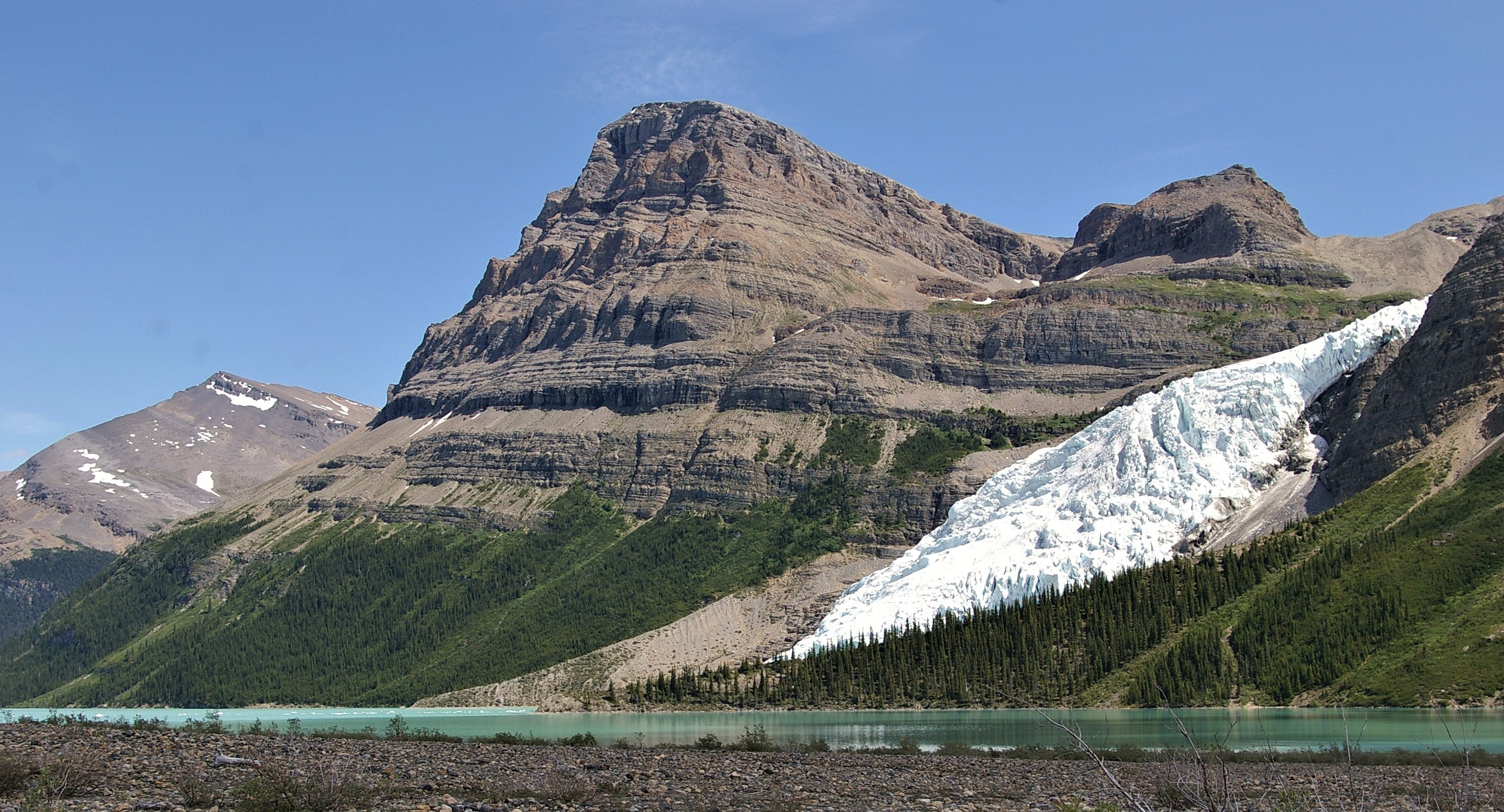
West aspect

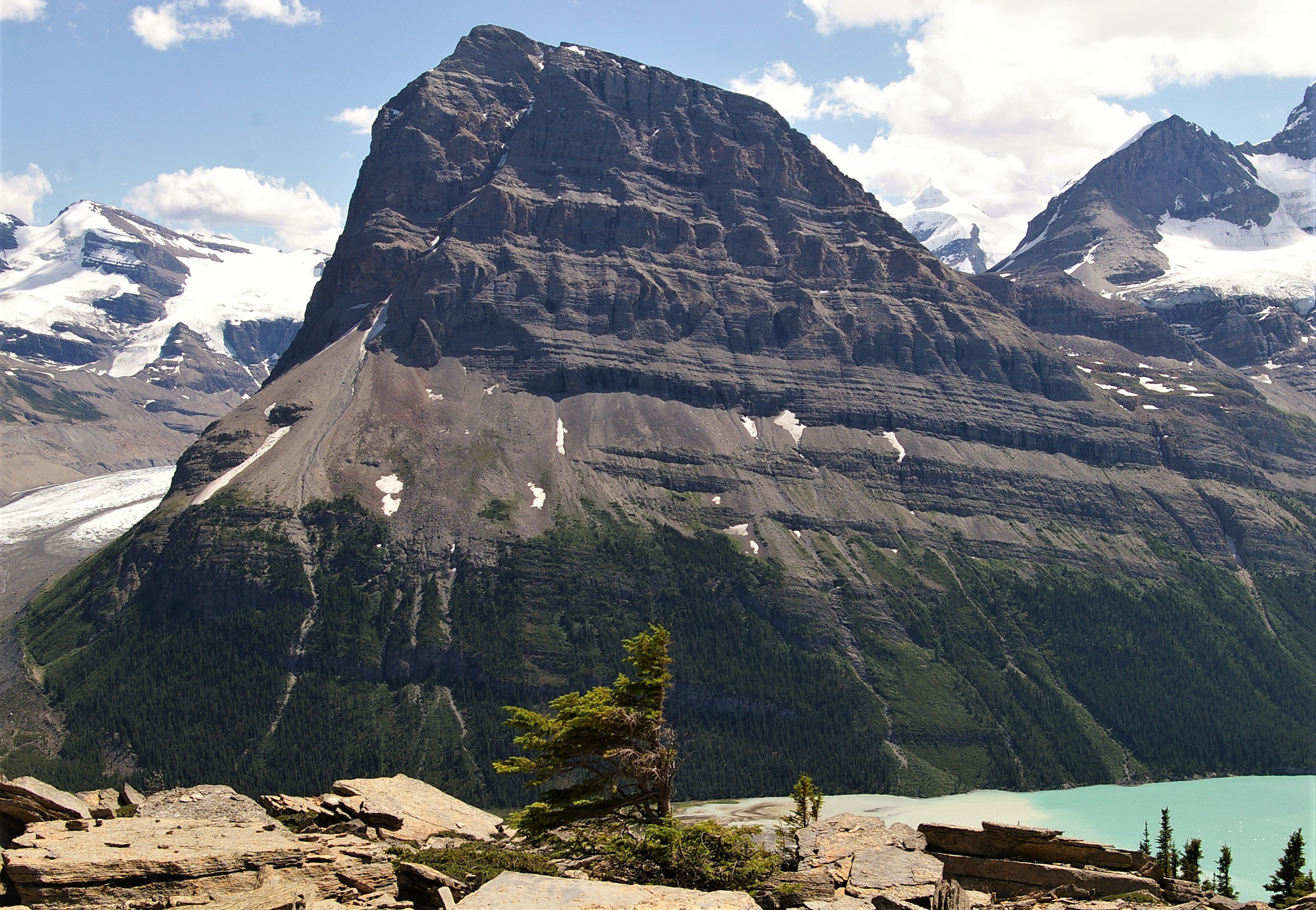
Northwest aspect

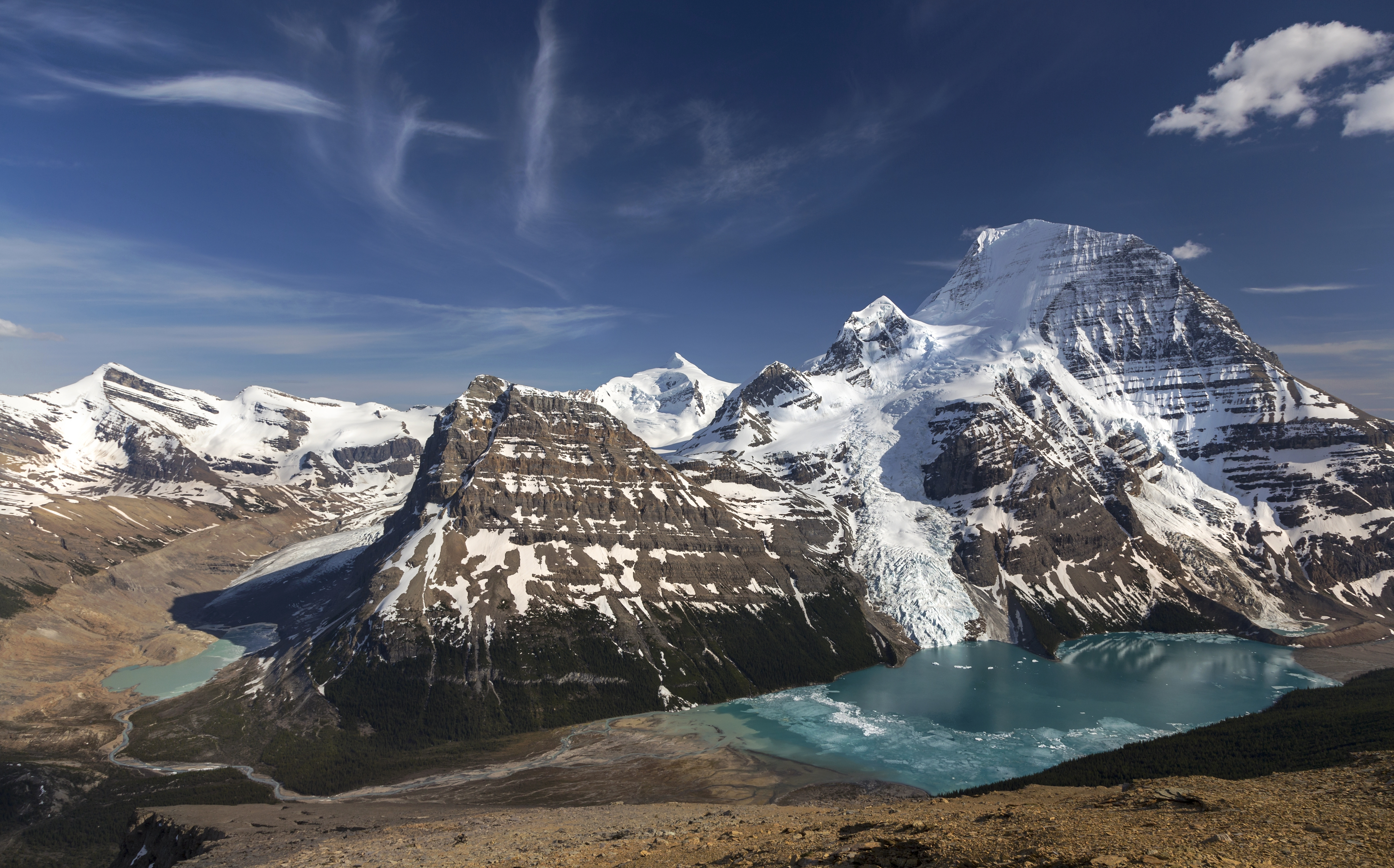
Rearguard Mountain with Mount Robson

== See also ==
- List of mountains in the Canadian Rockies
- Geography of British Columbia
