= Mount Kain =

Mountain in British Columbia, Canada

- Location within British Columbia

Highest point
- Elevation: 2,863 m (9,393 ft) (Note: Other sources state 2880 m.)
- Prominence: 239 m (784 ft)
- Parent peak: Resplendent Mountain (3425 m)
- Listing: Mountains of British Columbia
- Coordinates: 53°03′08″N 119°02′25″W

Geography
- Country: Canada
- Province: British Columbia
- District: Cariboo Land District
- Protected area: Mount Robson Provincial Park
- Parent range: Rainbow Range
- Topo map: NTS 83E3 Mount Robson

Climbing
- First ascent: 1934 by M.M. Strumia
- Easiest route: basic rock climb

Mount Kain is a mountain located in the Fraser River Valley of Mount Robson Provincial Park, Canada. Mt. Kain was named during a survey of the Mt. Robson region conducted by the Alpine Club of Canada during the summer of 1911. While surveying from a nearby peak, the party noticed the mountain and guide Conrad Kain exclaimed "Ach! That is my peak." Trip leader Arthur Oliver Wheeler recorded the peak as Mt. Kain.
