= Ranges of the Canadian Rockies =

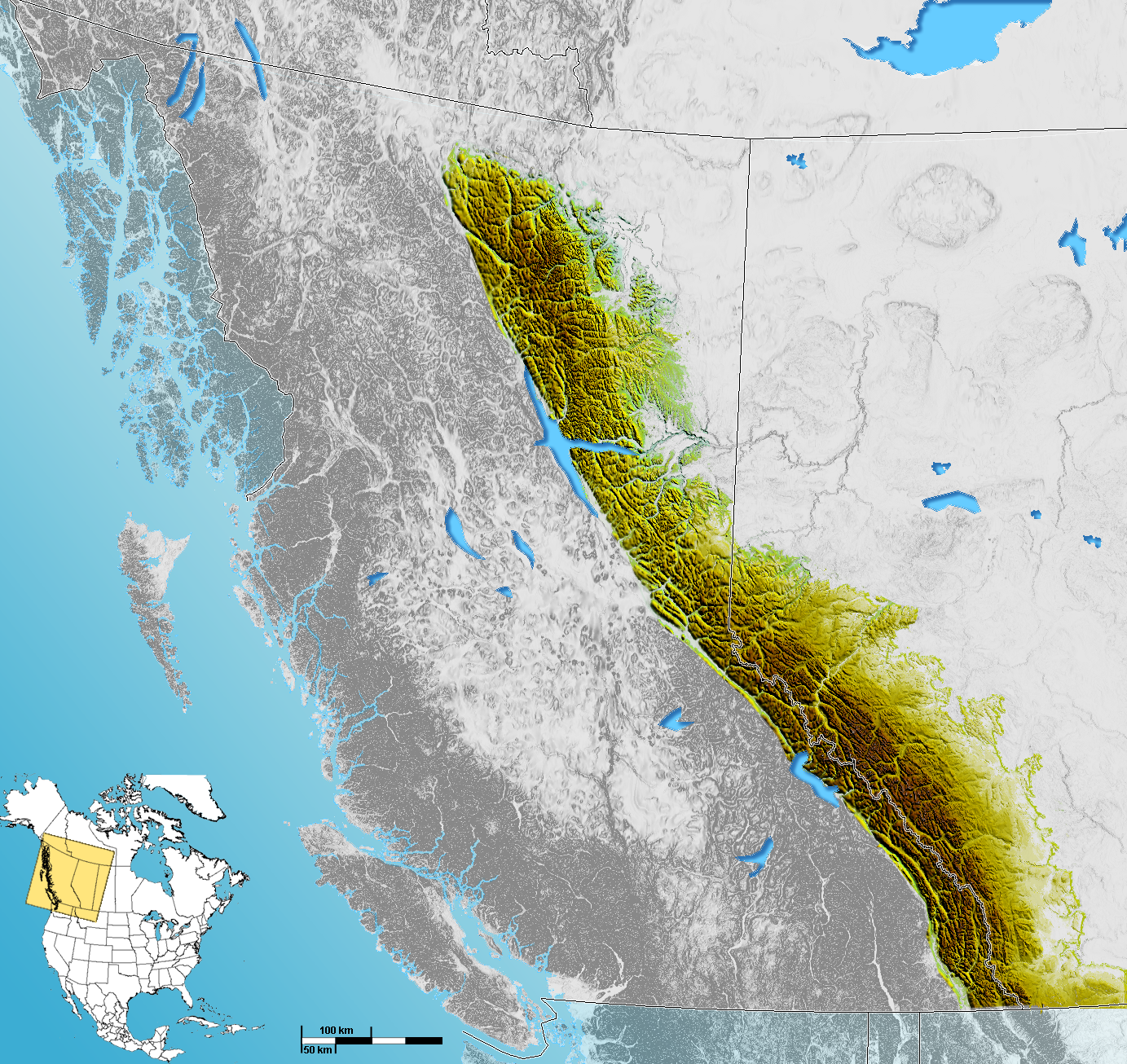
Extent of the Canadian Rockies

The Canadian Rockies are a segment of the North American Rocky Mountains found in the Canadian provinces of Alberta and British Columbia.

== List of ranges ==
There is no universally accepted hierarchical division of the Canadian Rockies into subranges. For ease of navigation only, this article follows and divides the Canadian Rockies into Far Northern Rockies, Northern Continental Ranges, Central Main Ranges, Central Front Ranges and Southern Continental Ranges, each of these subdivided in distinct areas and ranges.

From north to south and west to east, these mountain ranges are:

=== Far Northern Rockies ===
The Far Northern Rockies lie in British Columbia, and run from Prince George almost to the Yukon border.

- Muskwa Ranges
  - Akie Range
  - Battle of Britain Range
  - Deserters Range
  - Gataga Ranges
  - Rabbit Plateau
  - Sentinel Range
  - Stone Range
  - Terminal Range
  - Tochieka Range
  - Tower of London Range
  - Truncate Range
- Hart Ranges
  - Misinchinka Ranges (from Peace Arm - Williston Reservoir south to Monkman Pass
  - Murray Range
  - Pioneer Range
  - Solitude Range
  - Dezaiko Range

=== Northern Continental Ranges ===
The Northern Continental Ranges run along the British Columbia-Alberta border north from Jasper to Mount Sir Alexander.

- Rainbow Range
- Victoria Cross Ranges
- Northern Front ranges
  - Starlight Range
  - Persimmon Range
  - Berland Range
  - De Smet Range
  - Bosche Range
  - Boule Range

=== Central Main Ranges ===
The Central Main (or Park) Ranges lie northeast of the Rocky Mountain Trench, from Golden to Valemount.

- Selwyn Range
- South Jasper Ranges
  - The Ramparts
  - Trident Range
- Winston Churchill Range in Jasper National Park
- Southwest Central Park ranges
  - Blackwater Range
  - Van Horne Range
- Waputik Mountains
  - Waputik Range
    - President Range in Yoho National Park

=== Central Front Ranges ===
The Central Front Ranges lie northeast of the Rocky Mountain Trench, from Banff to Jasper.

- East Jasper ranges
  - Colin Range
  - Fiddle Range
  - Miette Range
  - Jacques Range
- Maligne Range
- Queen Elizabeth Ranges in Jasper National Park
- Nikanassin Range
- Ram Range
- Sawback Range in SE Banff NP
- Slate Range in Banff National Park
- Vermillion Range
- East Banff ranges
  - Bare Range
  - Palliser Range in the SE corner of Banff NP
  - Fairholme Range (in the Bow River valley)

=== Southern Continental Ranges ===
The Southern Continental Ranges run along the British Columbia-Alberta border from Banff down to Fernie

- Kootenay Ranges
  - Beaverfoot Range, NE of uppermost Columbia River valley
  - Brisco Range
  - Stanford Range
  - Van Nostrand Range
- Banff-Lake Louise Core Area
  - Ottertail Range
  - Vermilion Range
  - Ten Peaks Range
  - Ball Range in Kootenay National Park
  - Massive Range
- Assiniboine Area
  - Mitchell Range
  - Blue Range in Banff National Park
- South Banff Ranges
  - Sundance Range
- Kananaskis Country
  - Kananaskis Range
  - Fisher Range
  - Opal Range
  - Spray Mountains
- Elk Range (BC and Alberta)
- High Rock Range
  - Misty Range
- Livingstone Range
- Crowsnest Ranges
  - Lizard Range near Fernie, British Columbia, and in the Elk Valley
  - Flathead Range
  - Blairmore Range, east of Blairmore, Alberta

=== Border Ranges ===
- Clark Range on the Continental Divide
- Galton Range
- MacDonald Range

== See also ==
- List of mountains in the Canadian Rockies
- List of mountains of Alberta
- List of mountains of British Columbia
- List of mountains of Canada
