= Centre Mountain (Flathead Range) =

Mountain in British Columbia, Canada

- Location within British Columbia
- Interactive map of Centre Mountain

Highest point
- Elevation: 2,601 m (8,533 ft)
- Prominence: 310 m (1,020 ft)
- Parent peak: Mount Darrah
- Listing: Mountains of British Columbia
- Coordinates: 49°24′46″N 114°36′27″W

Geography
- Country: Canada
- Province: British Columbia
- District: Kootenay Land District
- Parent range: Flathead Range
- Topo map: NTS 82G7 Flathead Ridge

Centre Mountain is a mountain located on the NW side of North Kootenay Pass, SE of Fernie in the Flathead Range of British Columbia, Canada.
