= Tatei Ridge =

Mountain ridge in Alberta and British Columbia, Canada

- Location within Alberta Location within British Columbia Location within Canada

Highest point
- Elevation: 2,911 m (9,551 ft)
- Prominence: 80 m (260 ft)
- Listing: Mountains of Alberta; Mountains of British Columbia
- Coordinates: 53°09′39″N 119°04′46″W

Geography
- Country: Canada
- Provinces: Alberta and British Columbia
- Parent range: Rainbow Range
- Topo map: NTS 83E3 Mount Robson

Tatei Ridge is a mountain ridge east of Berg Lake at the northern end of Mount Robson Provincial Park on the Continental Divide marking the Alberta-British Columbia border. It was named in 1912 by Charles D. Walcott as tatei is the Stoney language word for "wind".

== See also ==
- List of peaks on the Alberta–British Columbia border
