= Titkana Peak =

Mountain in Alberta and British Columbia, Canada

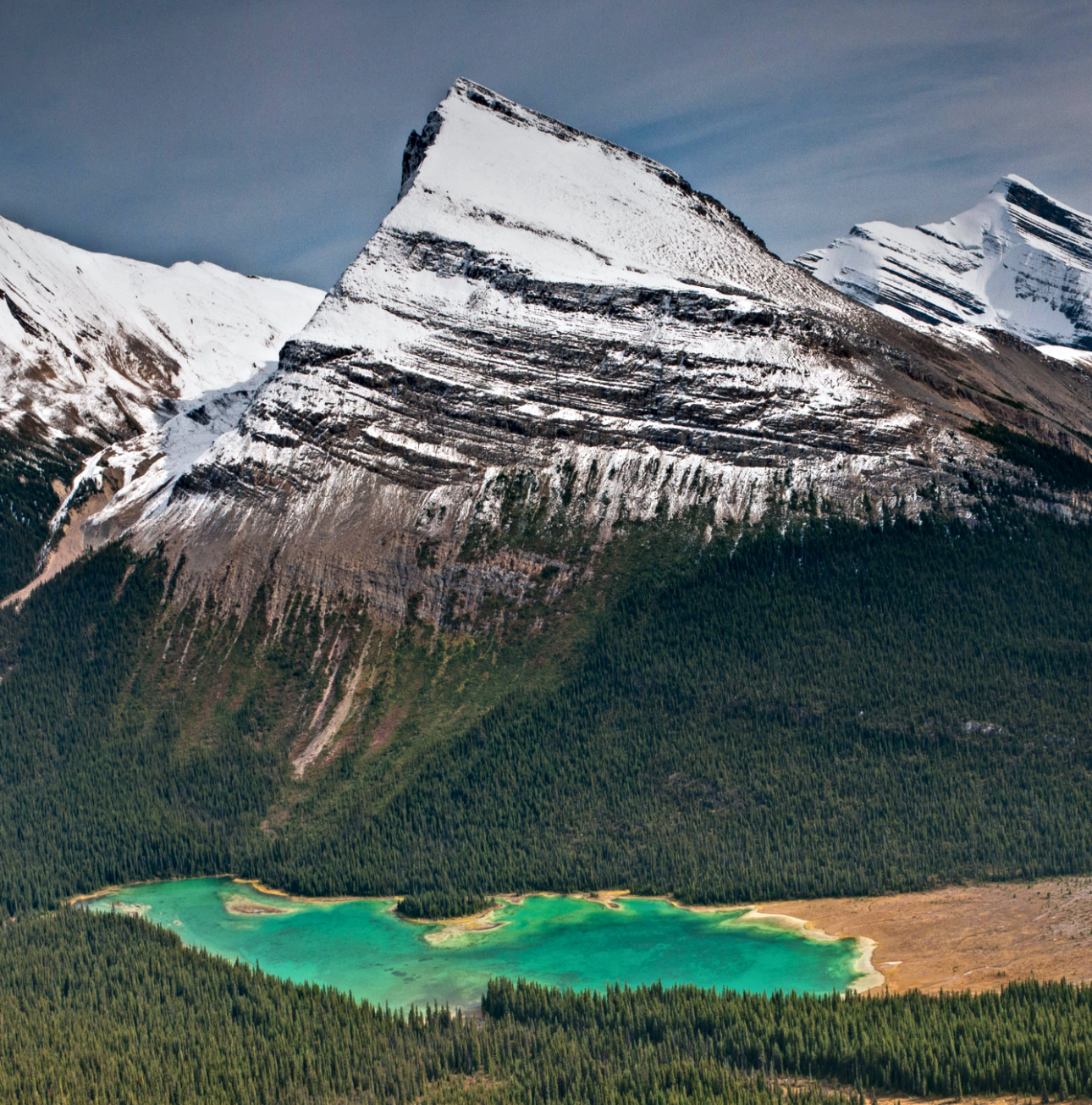
- September 2010

Highest point
- Elevation: 2,827 m (9,275 ft) (Note: Other sources state 2804 m.)
- Prominence: 397 m (1,302 ft)
- Listing: Mountains of Alberta; Mountains of British Columbia
- Coordinates: 53°09′18″N 119°03′54″W

Geography
- Location within Alberta Location within British Columbia Location within Canada
- Country: Canada
- Provinces: Alberta and British Columbia
- District: Cariboo Land District
- Protected area: Mount Robson Provincial Park
- Parent range: Rainbow Range
- Topo map: NTS 83E3 Mount Robson

Climbing
- First ascent: 1908 L. Coleman

Titkana Peak is located east of Berg Lake at the northern end of Mount Robson Provincial Park and straddles the Continental Divide marking the Alberta-British Columbia border. Arthur Coleman originally named it Ptarmigan Peak in 1907, but was renamed in 1908 to Titkana Peak. Titkana is the Stoney language word for 'bird'.

== See also ==
- List of peaks on the Alberta–British Columbia border
