= The Helmet (British Columbia) =

Peak in British Columbia, Canada

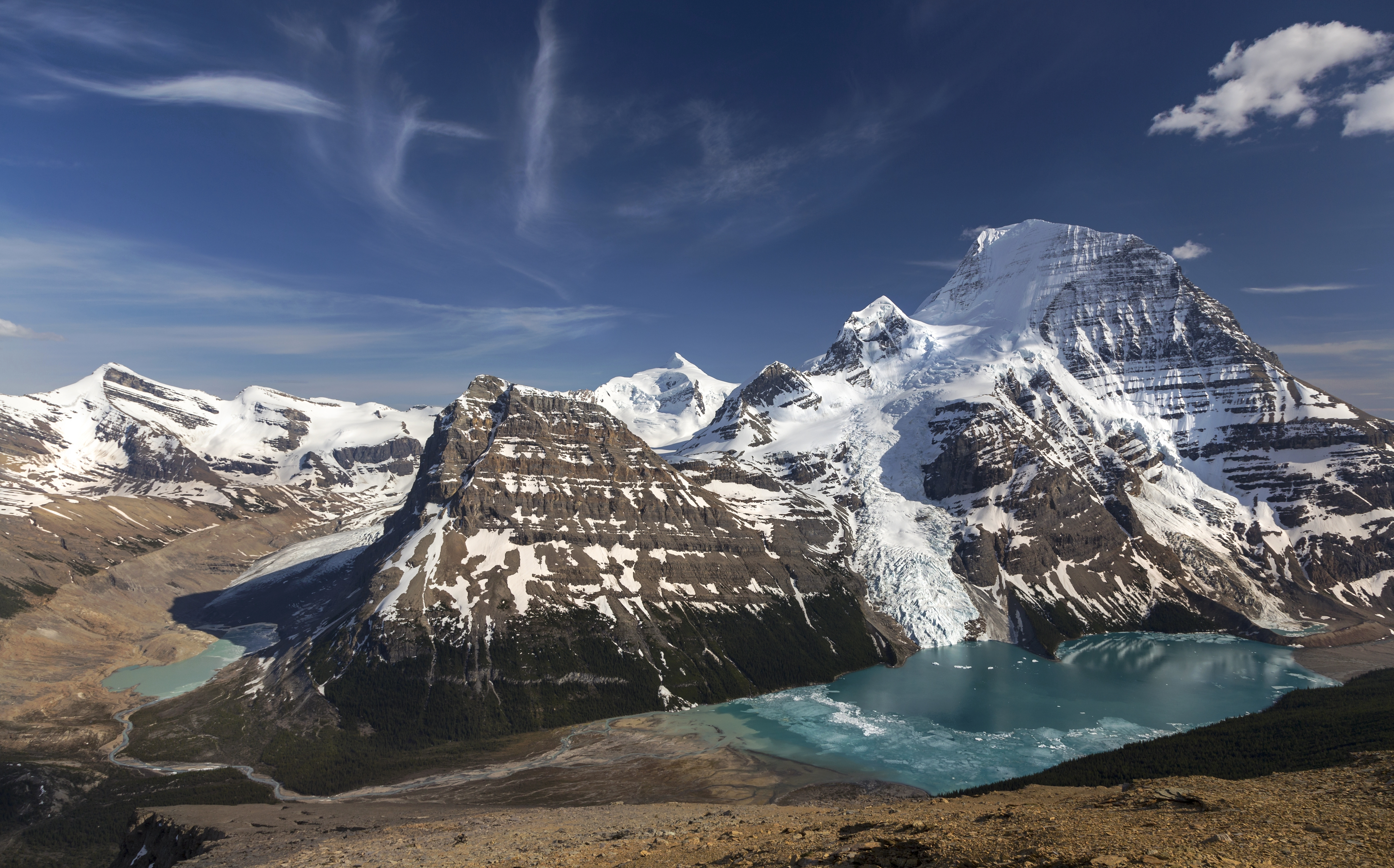
- Mt. Robson (far right), The Helmet (right)

Highest point
- Elevation: 3,420 m (11,220 ft)
- Prominence: 128 m (420 ft)
- Parent peak: Mount Robson (3954 m)
- Listing: Mountains of British Columbia
- Coordinates: 53°06′54″N 119°08′30″W

Geography
- Location within British Columbia Location within Canada
- Country: Canada
- Province: British Columbia
- District: Cariboo Land District
- Protected area: Mount Robson Provincial Park
- Parent range: Rainbow Range; Canadian Rockies
- Topo map: NTS 83E3 Mount Robson

Climbing
- First ascent: 1928 by Georgia Engelhard and Hans Fuhrer

The Helmet is a subsidiary peak on the Mount Robson massif located within Mount Robson Provincial Park in British Columbia, Canada. It is part of the Rainbow Range which is a sub-range of the Canadian Rockies.

== See also ==
- List of mountains in the Canadian Rockies
- Geography of British Columbia
