= Mount McGladrey =

Mountain in Alberta and British Columbia, Canada

- Location within Alberta Location within British Columbia Location within Canada

Highest point
- Elevation: 2,638 m (8,655 ft)
- Prominence: 198 m (650 ft)
- Listing: Mountains of Alberta; Mountains of British Columbia
- Coordinates: 49°30′36″N 114°35′14″W

Geography
- Country: Canada
- Provinces: Alberta and British Columbia
- District: Kootenay Land District
- Parent range: Flathead Range
- Topo map: NTS 82G10 Crowsnest

Mount McGladrey is located south of Crowsnest Pass and straddles the Continental Divide marking the Alberta-British Columbia border. It was named in 1914 after McGladrey; very little is known about the person.

== See also ==
- List of peaks on the Alberta–British Columbia border
