= Sentry Mountain =

Mountain in Alberta, Canada

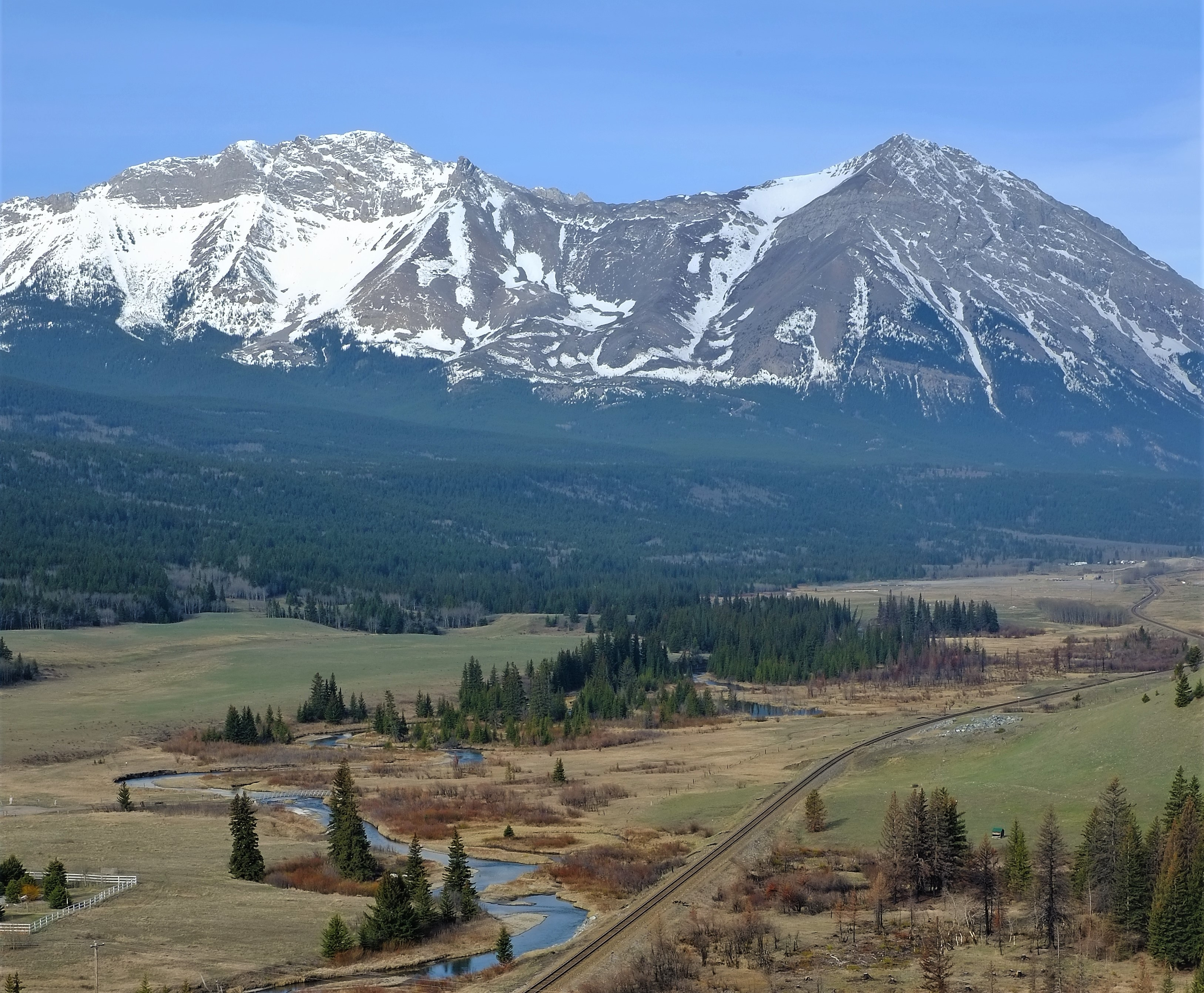
- Sentry Mountain, east-northeast aspect

Highest point
- Elevation: 2,435 m (7,989 ft)
- Prominence: 205 m (673 ft)
- Listing: Mountains of Alberta
- Coordinates: 49°36′41″N 114°38′18″W

Geography
- Location within Alberta Location within Canada
- Interactive map of Sentry Mountain
- Location: Castle Wildland Provincial Park; Alberta, Canada
- Parent range: Flathead Range; Canadian Rockies
- Topo map: NTS 82G10 Crowsnest

Geology
- Mountain type: Fault block
- Rock type: Limestone

Climbing
- Easiest route: Scrambling West ridge

Sentry Mountain is a 2,435-metre (7,989-foot) summit located in the Canadian Rockies of Alberta, Canada.

== Description ==
Sentry Mountain is situated 10 kilometers west-southwest of the town of Coleman in the Crowsnest Pass area and can be seen from Highway 3, the Crowsnest Highway, which traverses the northern base of the mountain. It is the northernmost peak of the Flathead Range and is set on land managed by Castle Wildland Provincial Park. Precipitation runoff from the mountain drains into headwaters of the Crowsnest River. Topographic relief is significant as the summit rises 1,080 meters (3,543 feet) above Crowsnest Lake in 1.5 kilometer (0.9 mile). Neighbors include Chinook Peak, 4.0 km (2.5 mi) to the southeast, and Mount Tecumseh is 6.0 km (3.7 mi) to the north. The mountain lies 4.0 km (2.5 mi) east of the Continental Divide.

== History ==
Sentry Mountain was originally named "Sentinel Mountain", but was changed in 1915 to avoid confusion with another by the same name. The mountain's toponym was officially adopted in 1924 by the Geographical Names Board of Canada.

== Geology ==
Sentry Mountain is composed of sedimentary rock laid down during the Precambrian to Jurassic periods. Formed in shallow seas, this sedimentary rock was pushed east and over the top of younger Cretaceous period rock during the Laramide orogeny.

== Climate ==
Based on the Köppen climate classification, Sentry Mountain has an alpine subarctic climate with cold, snowy winters, and mild summers. Temperatures can drop below −20 °C with wind chill factors below −30 °C.

== Gallery ==
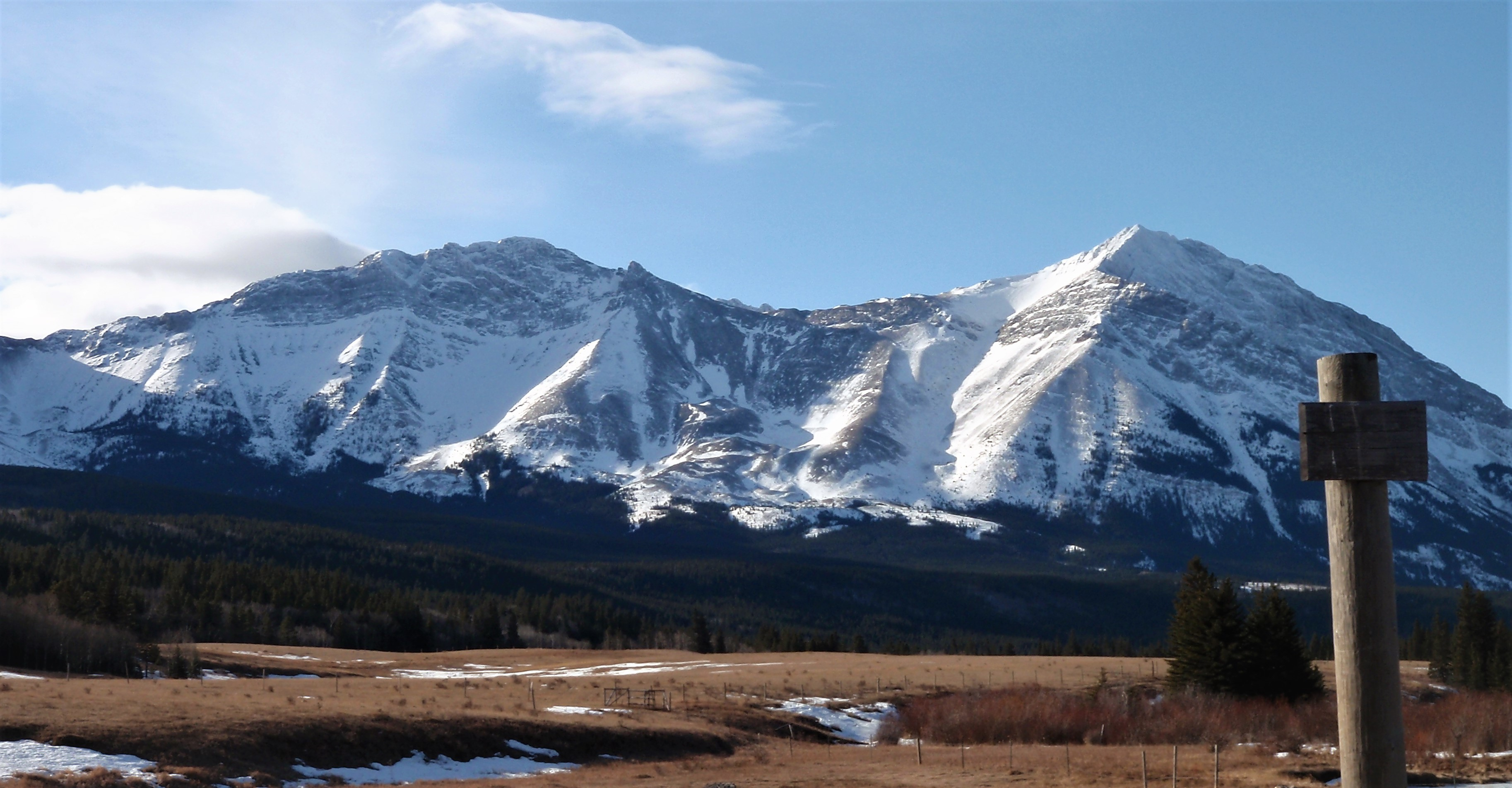
Sentry Mountain on the right, but some maps label the peak on the left as Sentry Mountain as it is slightly higher.
The peak to left is unofficially known as "Ostracized Peak".

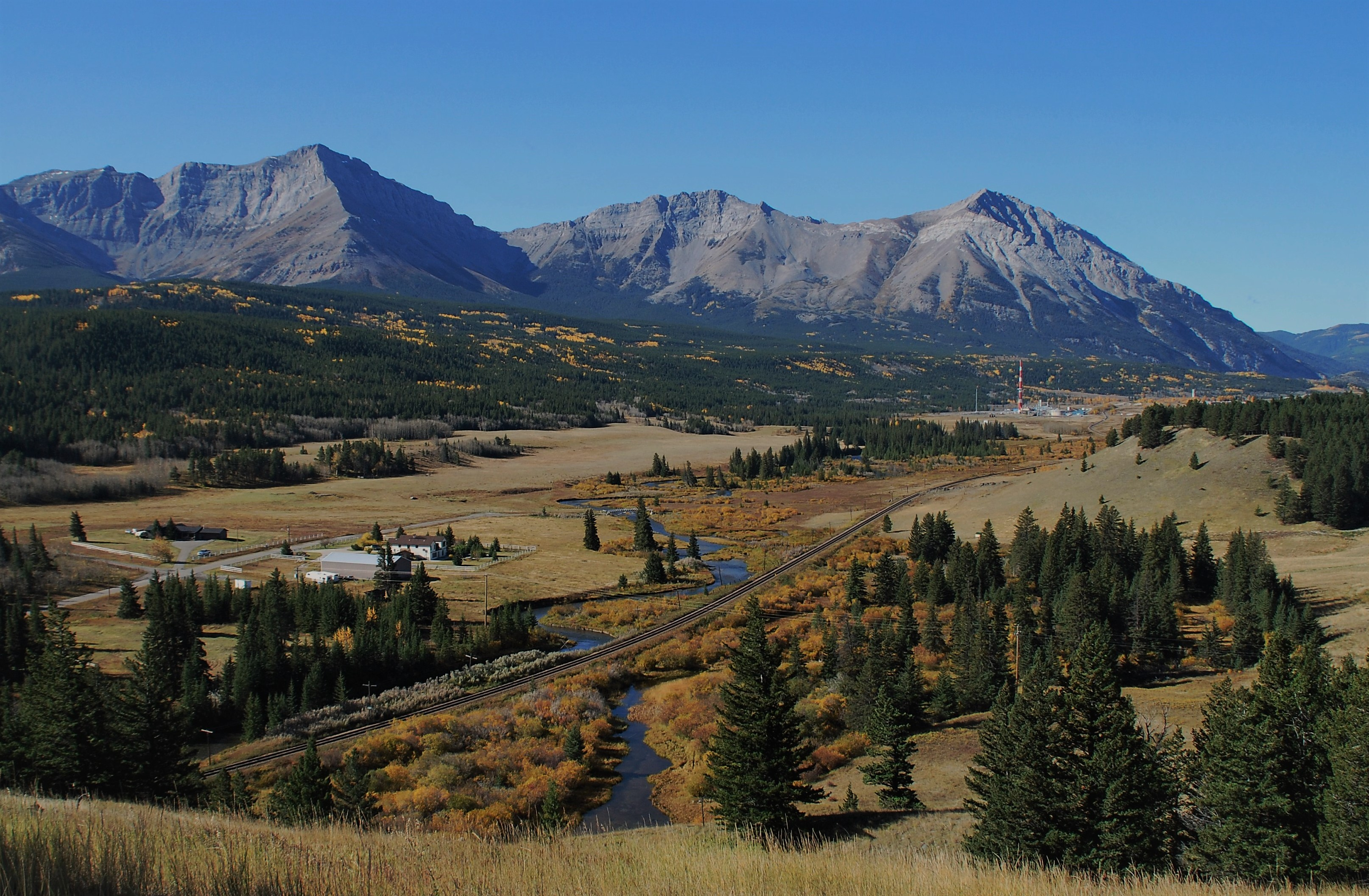
Chinook Peak (left) and Sentry Mountain (right) rising above Crowsnest Valley

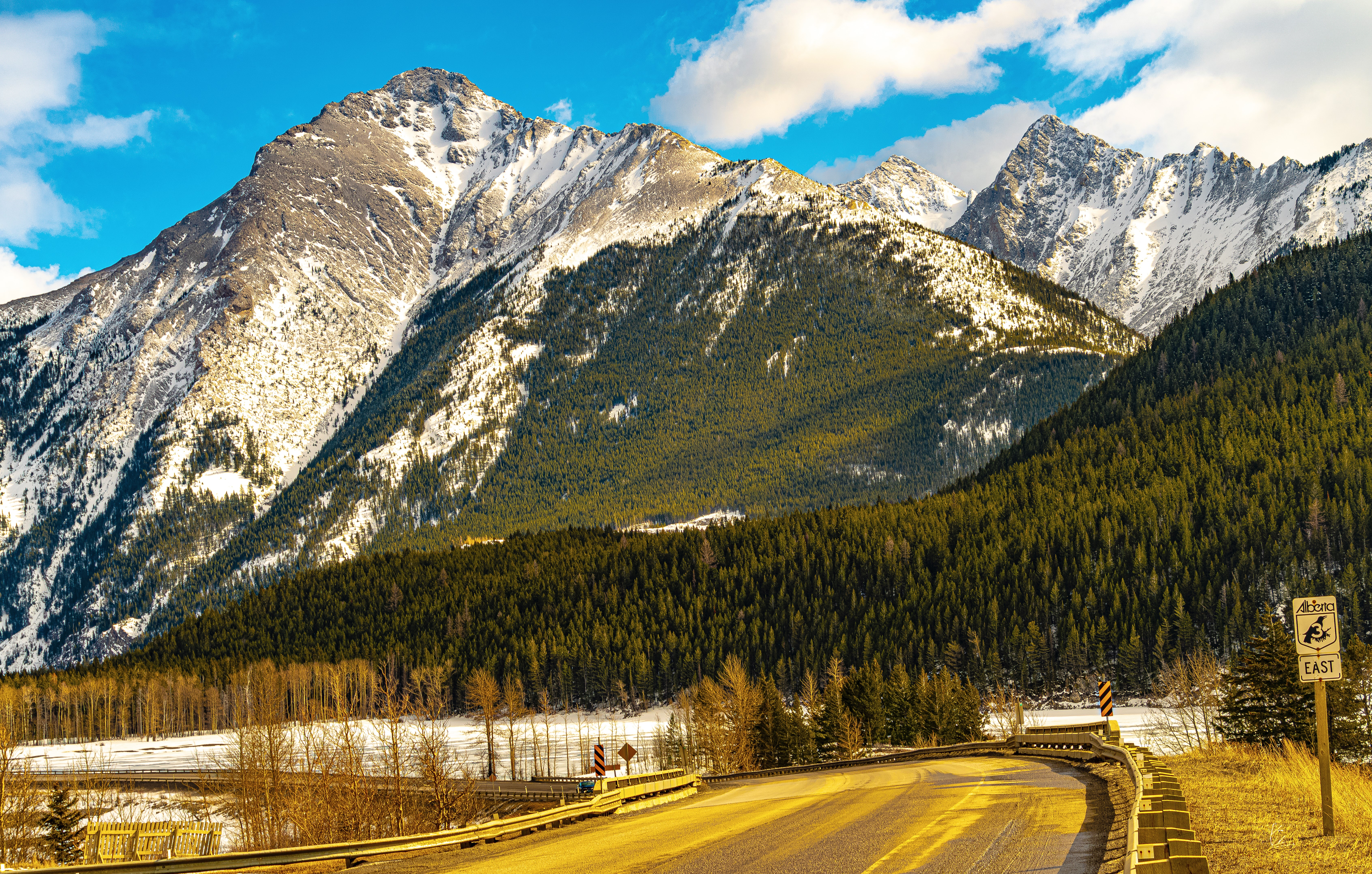
West side Sentry Mountain on the left, from eastbound Highway 3

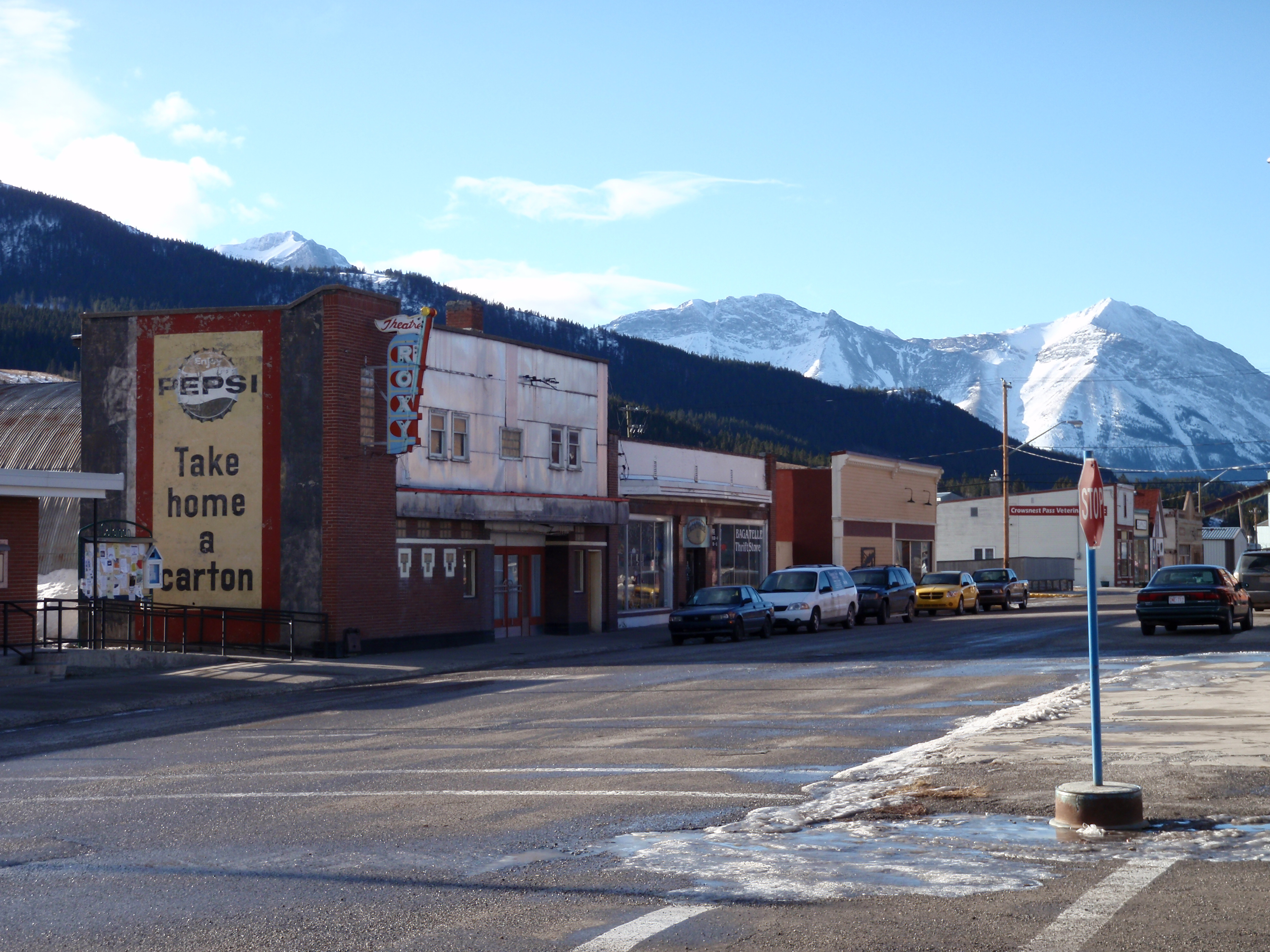
Sentry Mountain (right) seen from Coleman

== See also ==
- Geology of Alberta
