= Flathead Range (Canada) =

Mountain range in British Columbia and Alberta, Canada

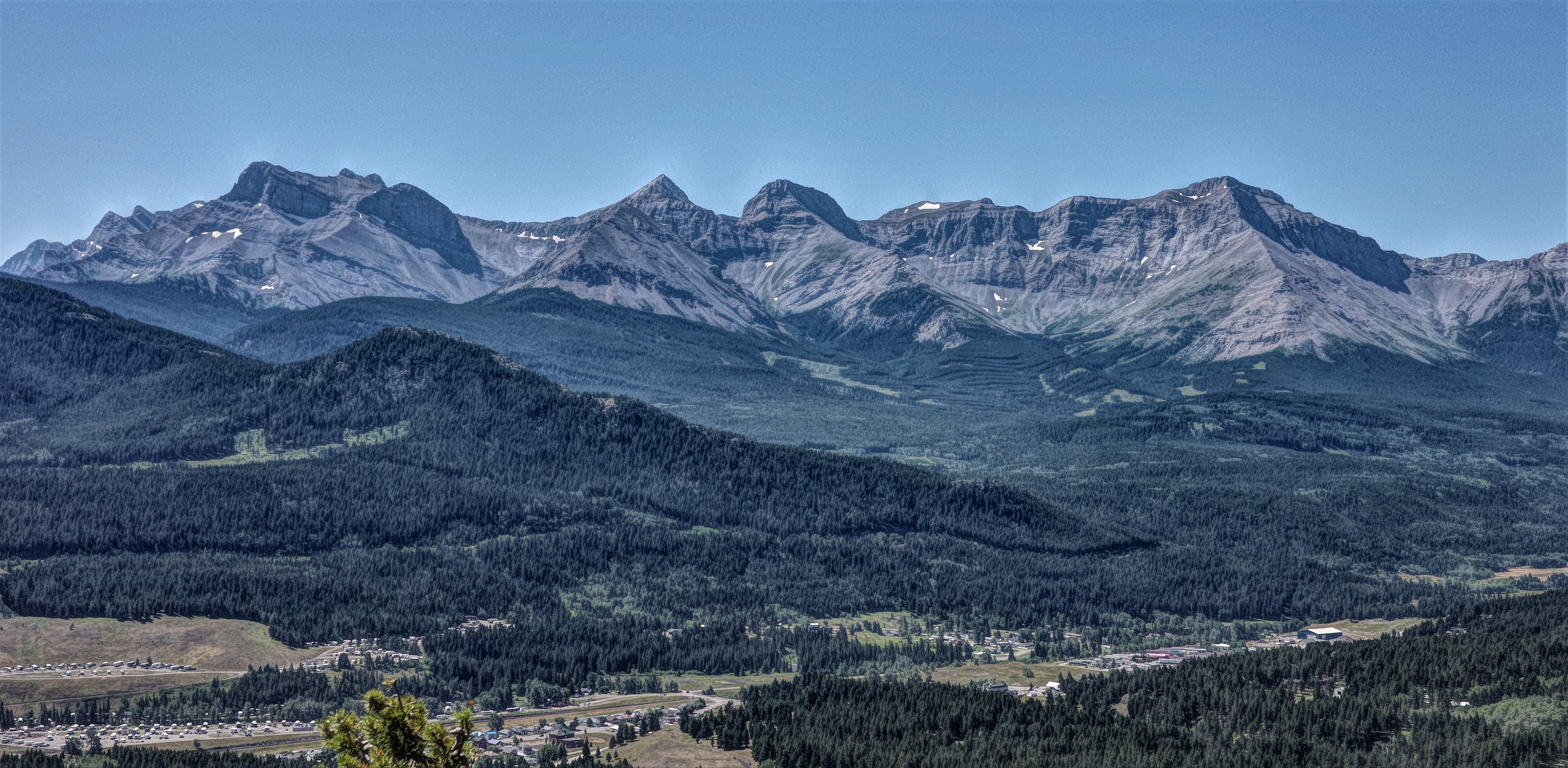
- Flathead Range in the Crowsnest Pass area. Left to rightː Mount Coulthard, Andy Good Peak, Mount Parrish, Chinook Peak.

Highest point
- Peak: Mount Ptolemy
- Elevation: 2,815 m (9,236 ft)
- Coordinates: 49°32′56″N 114°37′52″W

Geography
- Location within Alberta Location within British Columbia Location within Canada
- Country: Canada
- Provinces: Alberta and British Columbia
- Range coordinates: 49°26′59″N 114°35′59″W
- Parent range: Crowsnest Range
- Borders on: Castle Wildland Provincial Park

Geology
- Orogeny: Lewis Overthrust

The Flathead Range is a mountain range of the Canadian Rockies in Alberta and British Columbia, Canada. It is located on the Continental Divide, east of Fernie, in the Kootenay Land District. It stretches 27 km (17 mi) lengthwise north–south from Crowsnest Pass to North Kootenay Pass. The range's toponym was officially adopted on 30 June 1912 by the Geographic Board of Canada, and was named in association with the Flathead River.

The highest peak is Mount Ptolemy, with an elevation of 2,815 m (9,236 ft).

== Summits ==
Peak	Elevation		Prominence		Coordinates
Peak	m	ft	m	ft	Coordinates
Andy Good Peak	2,662	8,734	262	860	49°33′55″N 114°35′17″W
Centre Mountain	2,601	8,533	310	1,020	49°24′46″N 114°36′27″W
Chinook Peak	2,591	8,501	246	807	49°35′8″N 114°36′36″W
Mount Coulthard	2,645	8,678	255	837	49°33′26″N 114°34′22″W
Mount Darrah	2,755	9,039	428	1,404	49°28′22″N 114°35′37″W
Mount McGladrey	2,638	8,655	198	650	49°30′36″N 114°35′14″W
Mount McLaren	2,301	7,549	220	720	49°34′59″N 114°34′5″W
Mount Parrish	2,530	8,300	161	528	49°34′30″N 114°35′17″W
Mount Pengelly	2,586	8,484	226	741	49°30′6″N 114°35′46″W
Mount Ptolemy	2,815	9,236	885	2,904	49°32′56″N 114°37′52″W
Sentry Mountain	2,435	7,989	205	673	49°36′41″N 114°38′18″W

== See also ==
- Ranges of the Canadian Rockies
