= Mount Pengelly =

Mountain in Alberta and British Columbia, Canada

- Location within Alberta Location within British Columbia Location within Canada

Highest point
- Elevation: 2,586 m (8,484 ft)
- Prominence: 226 m (741 ft)
- Listing: Mountains of Alberta; Mountains of British Columbia
- Coordinates: 49°30′06″N 114°35′46″W

Geography
- Country: Canada
- Provinces: Alberta and British Columbia
- District: Kootenay Land District
- Parent range: Flathead Range
- Topo map: NTS 82G10 Crowsnest

Mount Pengelly is located southeast of Fernie and straddles the Continental Divide marking the Alberta-British Columbia border. It was named in 1914: Pengelly was the family name of the wife of A.J. Campbell, an assistant to A.O. Wheeler of the Interprovincial Boundary Survey.

== See also ==
- List of peaks on the Alberta–British Columbia border
