= Crowsnest Mountain =

Mountain in Alberta, Canada

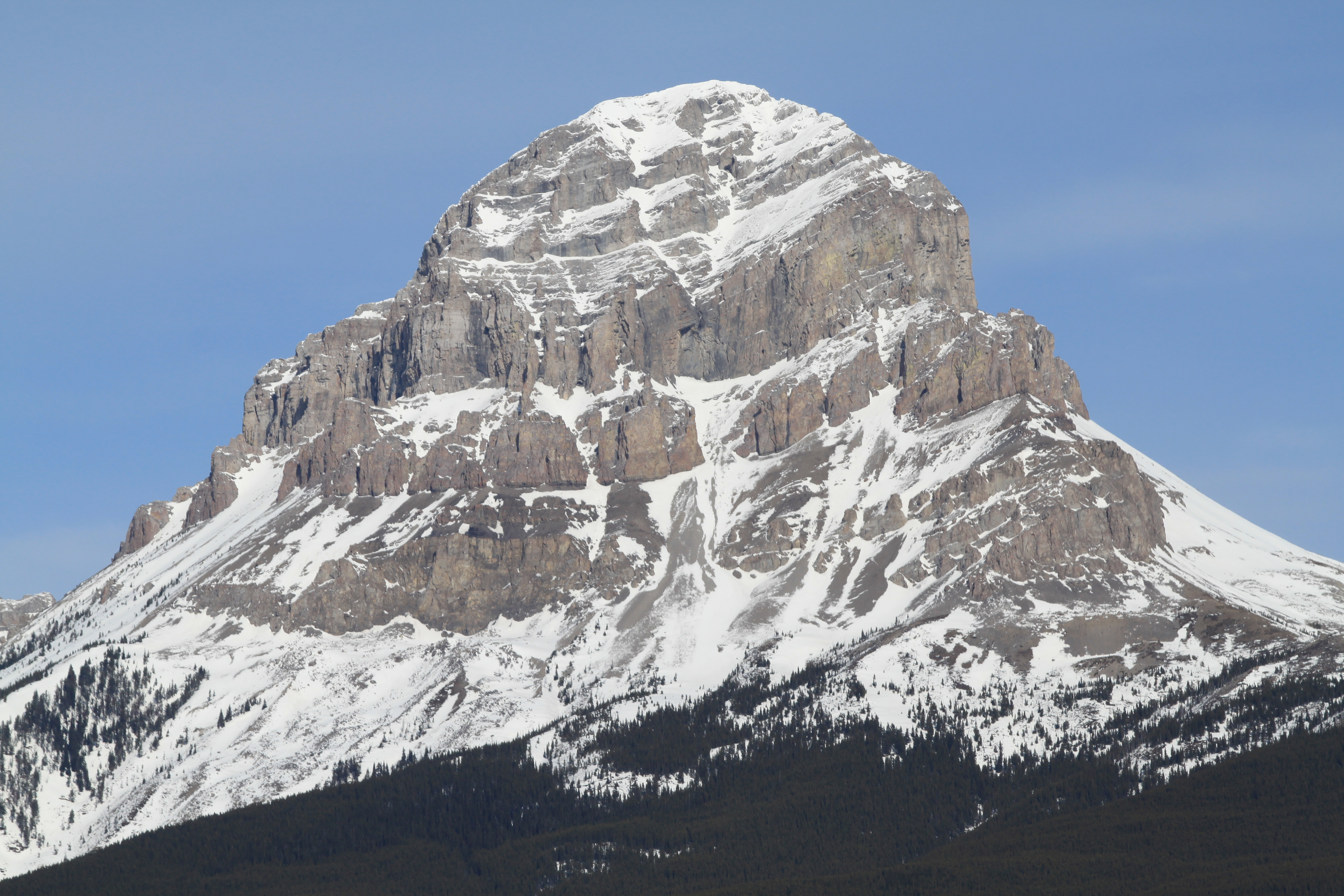
- Crowsnest Mountain, March 2010

Highest point
- Elevation: 2,785 m (9,137 ft)
- Prominence: 925 m (3,035 ft)
- Parent peak: Mount Erris
- Listing: Mountains of Alberta
- Coordinates: 49°42′13″N 114°34′26″W

Geography
- Location within Alberta
- Location: Alberta, Canada
- Parent range: Crowsnest Range
- Topo map: NTS 82G10 Crowsnest

Geology
- Rock age(s): Paleozoic (upper), Mesozoic (lower)
- Mountain type: Limestone

Climbing
- First ascent: July 28, 1904 by Tom Wilson, Christian Hasler sr., Friedrich Michel
- Easiest route: moderate scramble

Crowsnest Mountain is a mountain in the southern Canadian Rockies of southwestern Alberta, Canada. It can be seen from Alberta Highway 3 west of the town of Coleman in the Crowsnest Pass. The mountain was originally named by the Ktunaxa First Nations due to ravens nesting in the area. The scrambling route on the north side was first ascended in 1915.

== Geology ==
The grey rocks exposed in the cliffs on the upper part of Crowsnest Mountain are limestones and shales of Late Devonian to Early Mississippian age (the Palliser at the base, overlain by the Exshaw and Banff, with the Livingstone Formation at the summit). They were moved up from the west along the Lewis thrust fault and emplaced over younger rocks (the Late Cretaceous Belly River Formation) that underlie the wooded lower slopes of the mountain. During that movement they were formed into a broad syncline by fault-bend folding.

The Devonian to Mississippian rocks are part of the Lewis thrust sheet which was originally continuous from the High Rock Range immediately to the west. The thrust sheet has since been cut through by erosion along Allison Creek, however, leaving Crowsnest Mountain and its northerly neighbour, Seven Sisters Mountain, standing together as an isolated klippe.
