= Seven Sisters Mountain =

Mountain in the country of Canada

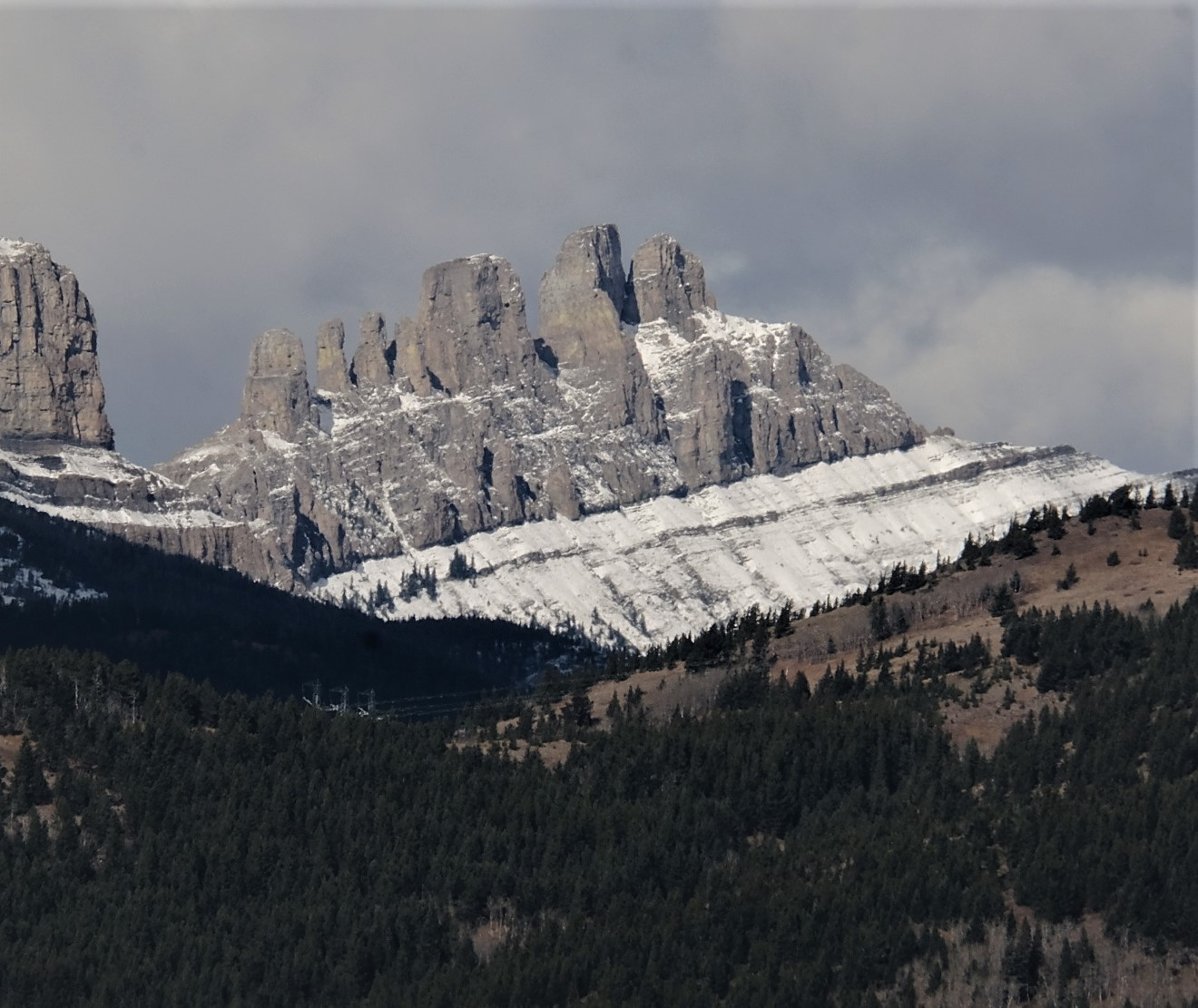
- Southeast aspect

Highest point
- Elevation: 2,591 m (8,501 ft)
- Parent peak: Crowsnest Mountain (2,785 m)
- Listing: Mountains of Alberta
- Coordinates: 49°43′23″N 114°34′56″W

Geography
- Location within Alberta Location within Canada
- Interactive map of Seven Sisters Mountain
- Location: Alberta, Canada
- Parent range: High Rock Range; Canadian Rockies
- Topo map: NTS 82G10 Crowsnest

Geology
- Mountain type: Klippe
- Rock type: Limestone

Climbing
- First ascent: 1951

Seven Sisters Mountain is a 2,591-metre-high (8,501 ft) mountain summit located in the Canadian Rockies of Alberta, Canada.

== Description ==
Seven Sisters Mountain is situated 11 kilometres (6.8 mi) northwest of the town of Coleman in the Crowsnest Pass area and can be seen from Highway 3, the Crowsnest Highway. The mountain is set near the southern end of the High Rock Range. Precipitation runoff from the mountain drains west to Allison Creek and east to McGillivray Creek which are both tributaries of the nearby Crowsnest River. Topographic relief is significant as the summit rises 870 metres (2,850 ft) above Allison Creek in two kilometres (1.2 mi). The summit of Seven Sisters Mountain lies four kilometres (2.5 mi) east of the Continental Divide and the nearest higher neighbor is Crowsnest Mountain, 2 kilometres (1.2 mi) immediately to the south.

== History ==
This landform was originally named "The Steeples" by the Palliser expedition. The mountain's present toponym was officially adopted in 1978 by the Geographical Names Board of Canada. The descriptive name is attributable to its seven distinct towers and pinnacles.

The first ascent of the summit was made in 1951 by Bruno Engler.

== Geology ==
Seven Sisters Mountain is composed of limestone and shale of Late Devonian to Early Mississippian age. Formed in shallow seas, this sedimentary rock was initially uplifted beginning 170 million years ago when the Lewis Overthrust fault pushed an enormous slab of rocks three miles (4.8 km) thick, 50 miles (80 km) wide and 160 miles (260 km) long over younger rock during the Laramide orogeny. The thrust sheet has since been cut through by erosion along Allison Creek, leaving Seven Sisters Mountain and Crowsnest Mountain standing together as an isolated klippe.

== Climate ==
Based on the Köppen climate classification, the mountain has an alpine subarctic climate with cold, snowy winters, and mild summers. Temperatures can drop below −20 °C with wind chill factors below −30 °C.

== Gallery ==
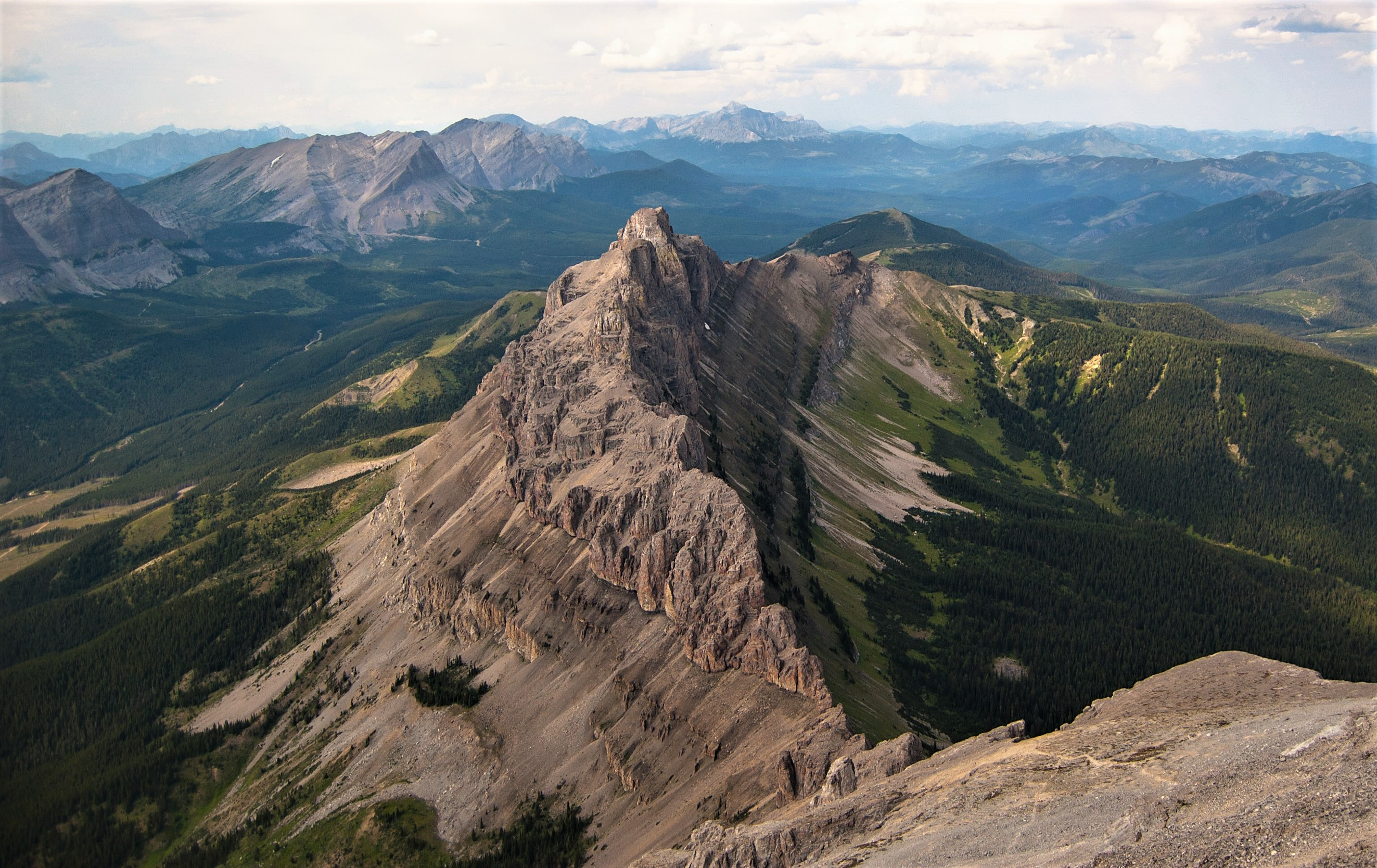
South aspect, from Crowsnest Mountain

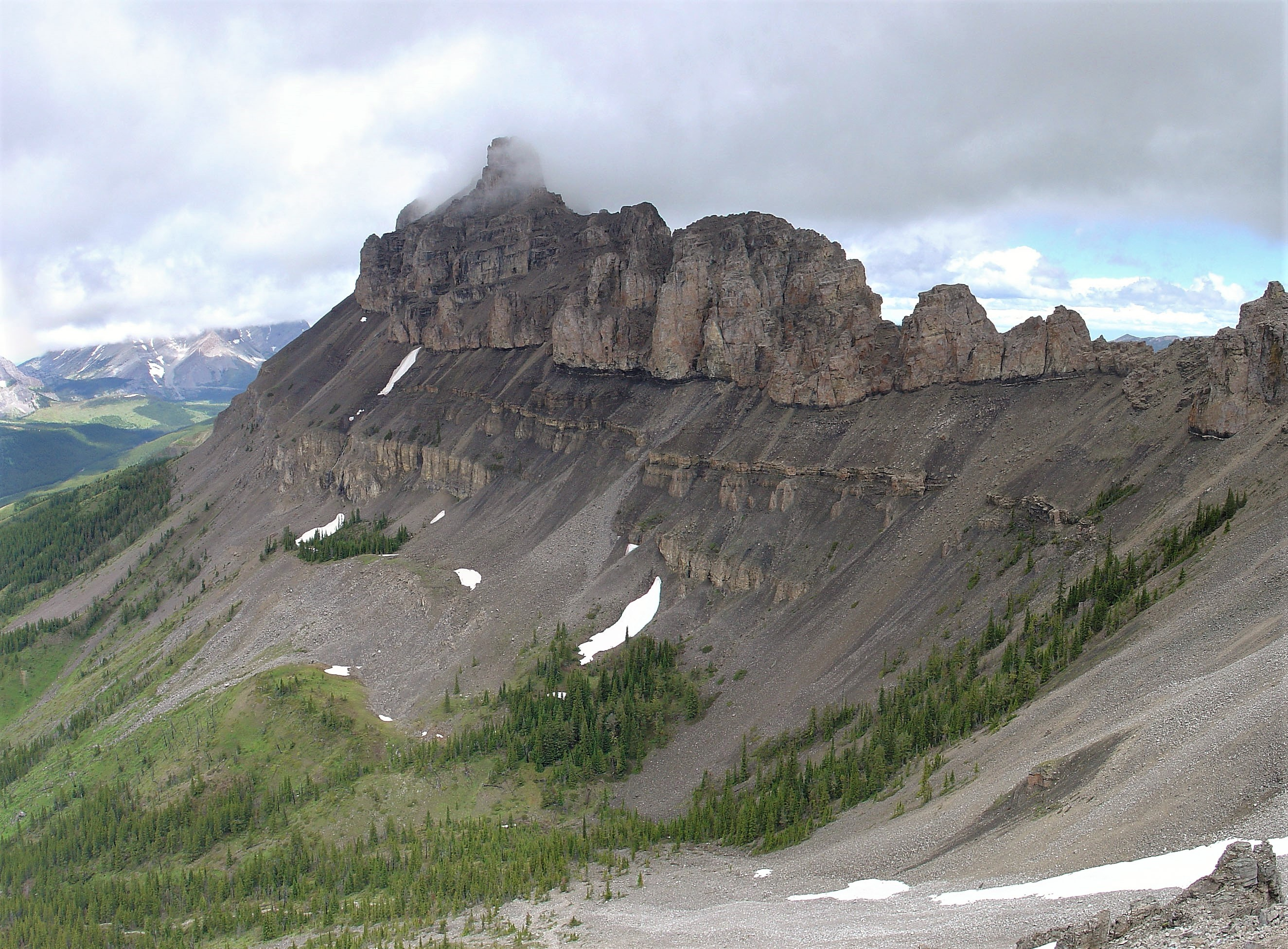
Southwest aspect

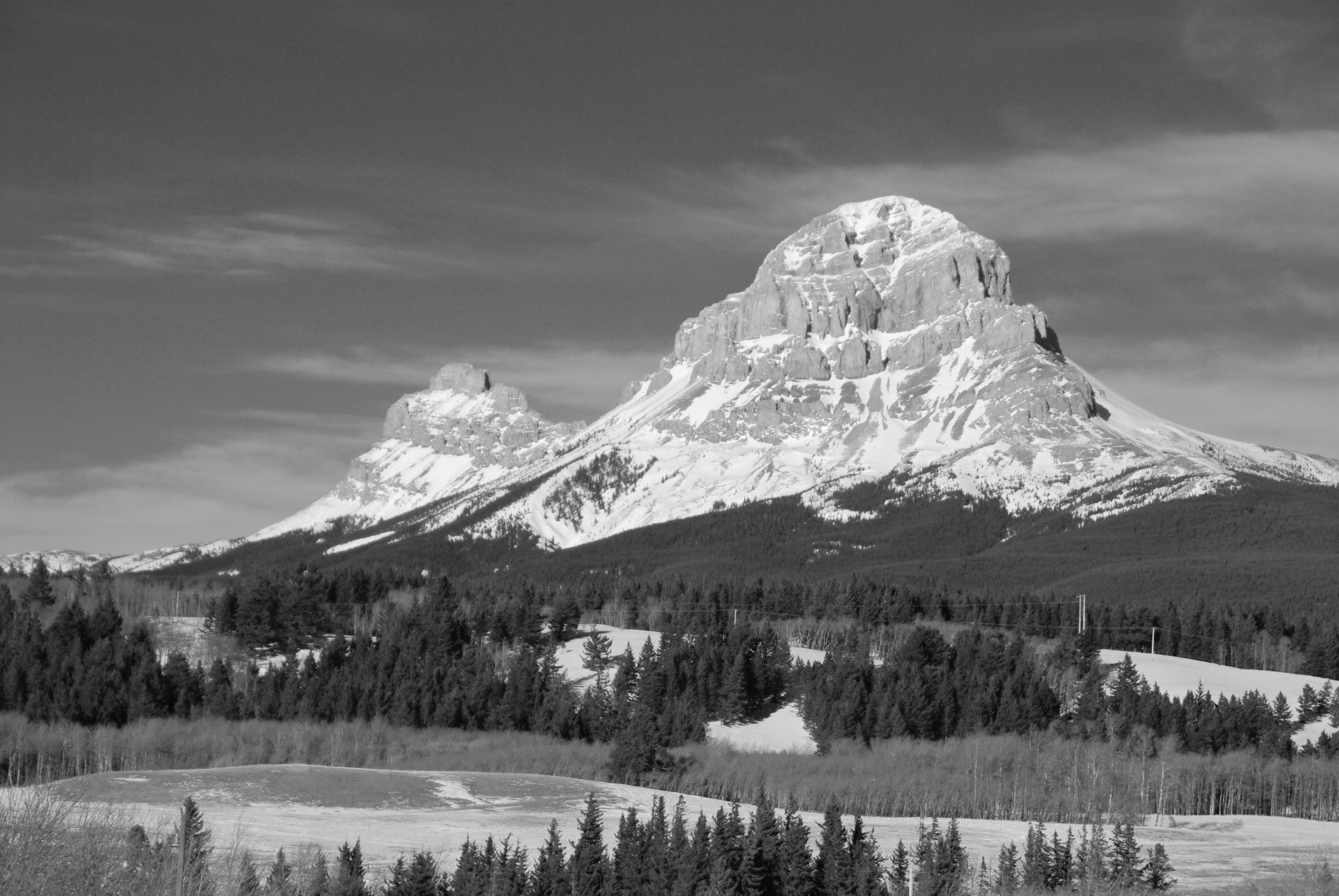
Seven Sisters Mountain (left) and Crowsnest Mountain (right)

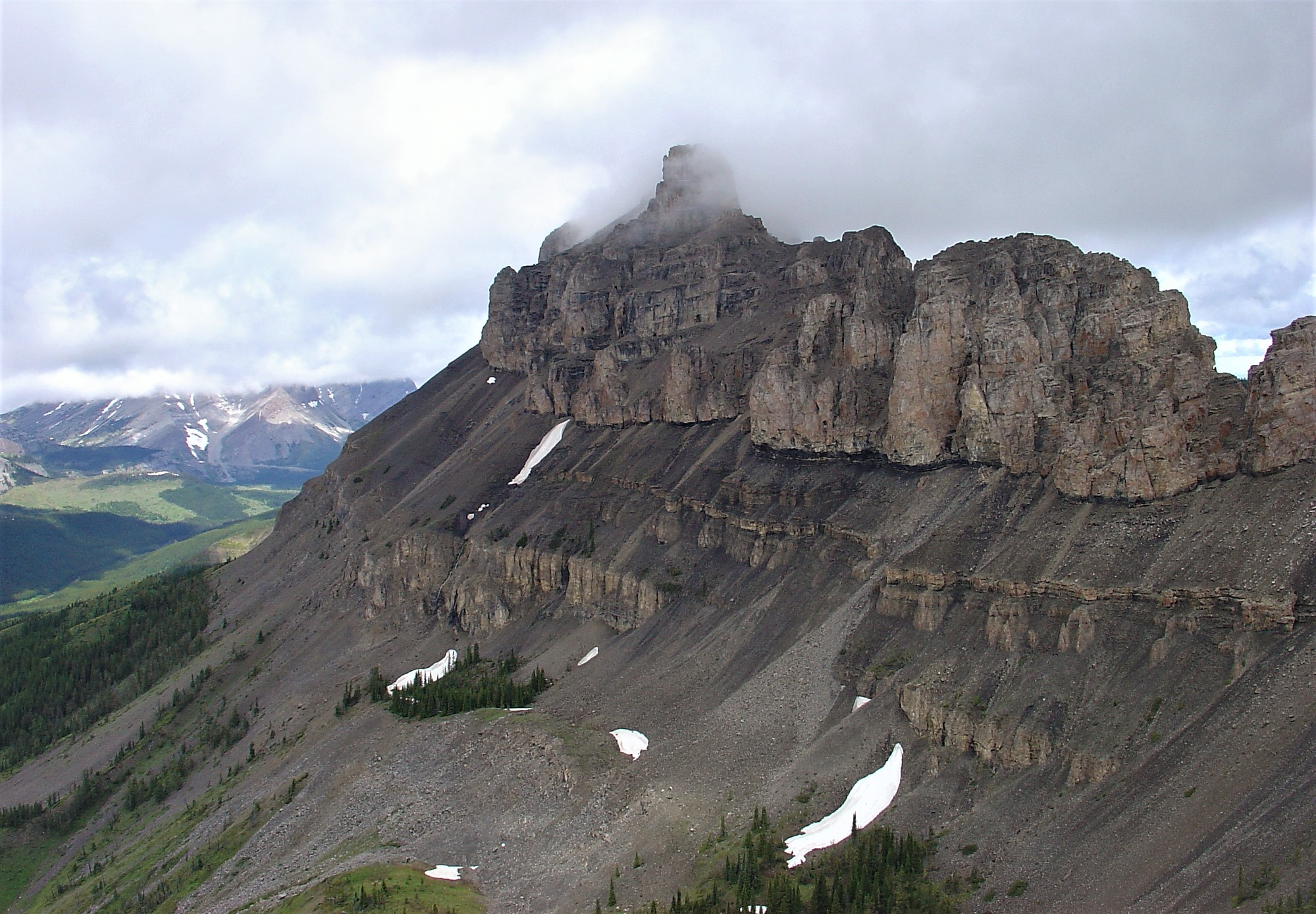
Southwest aspect

== See also ==
- Geology of Alberta
