= Rainbow Range (Rocky Mountains) =

Subrange of the Park Ranges in Alberta and British Columbia, Canada

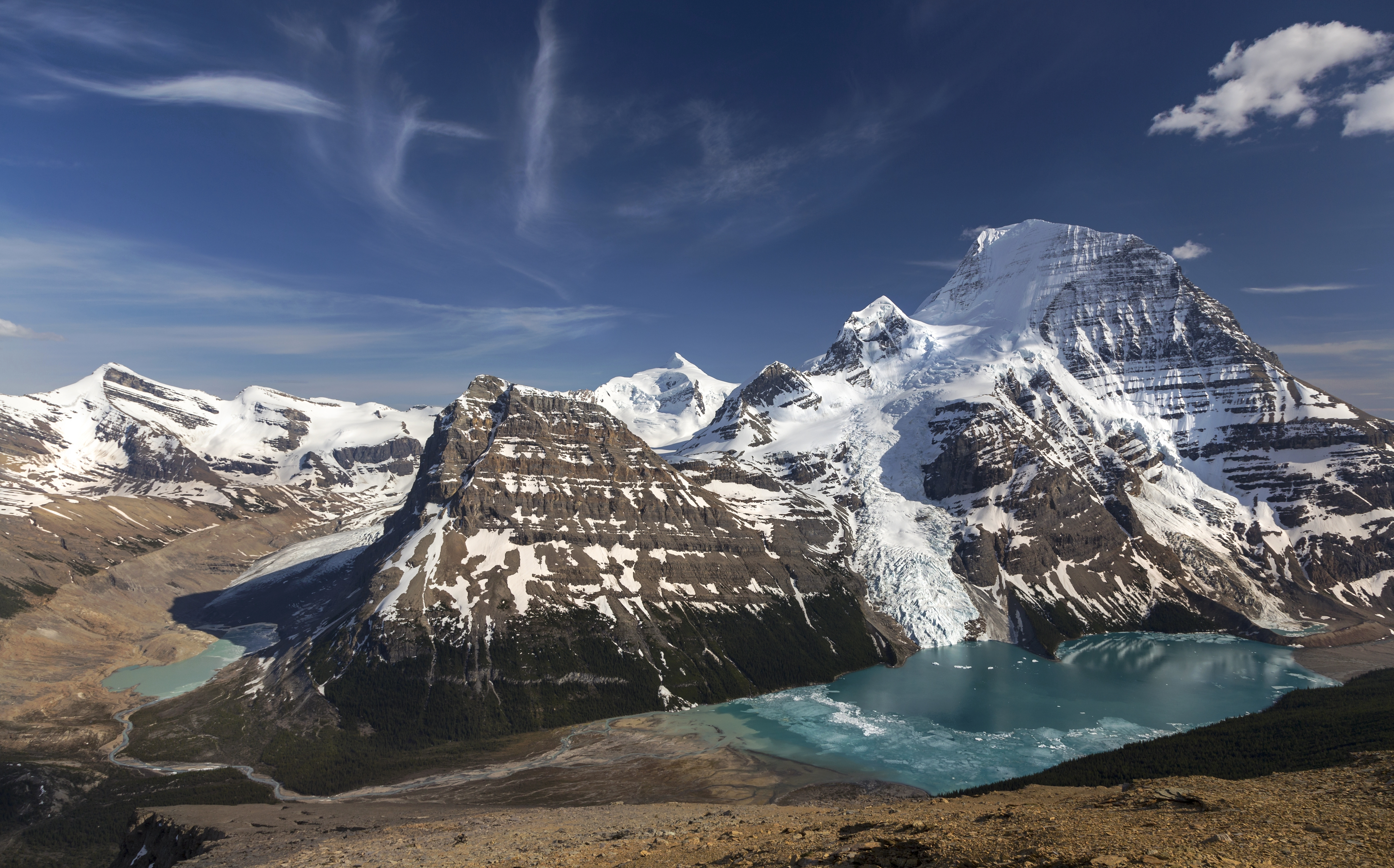
- Lynx Mountain, Rearguard Mountain, Resplendent Mountain, Mount Robson, and Berg Lake

Highest point
- Peak: Mount Robson
- Elevation: 3,954 m (12,972 ft)
- Prominence: 2,829 m (9,281 ft)
- Listing: Mountains of British Columbia; Mountains in Canadian Rockies
- Coordinates: 53°06′38″N 119°09′23″W

Dimensions
- Area: 497 km^{2} (192 mi^{2})

Geography
- Location within Alberta Location within British Columbia Location within Canada
- Country: Canada
- Provinces: British Columbia; Alberta
- Range coordinates: 53°03′N 119°03′W
- Parent range: Canadian Rockies
- Topo map: NTS 83D15 Lucerne

The Rainbow Range is a small subrange of the Park Ranges subdivisions of the Northern Continental Ranges of the Rocky Mountains on the border between Alberta and British Columbia in Mount Robson Provincial Park.

Its highest summit, and the highest in the Canadian Rockies, is Mount Robson 3,954 m (12,972 ft), followed by nearby Resplendent Mountain 3,425 m (11,237 ft).

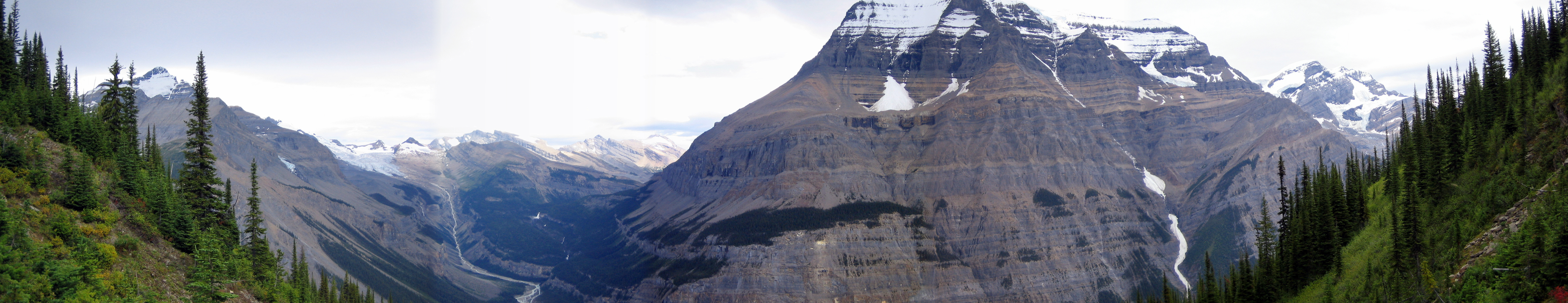
Left to Right: Whitehorn Mountain, Valley of a Thousand Falls, Mount Robson, Resplendent Mountain

== Mountains and peaks ==
Rank	Mountain / Peak	Elevation		Prominence		FA	Easiest route	Coordinates
Rank	Mountain / Peak	m	ft	m	ft	FA	Easiest route	Coordinates
1	Mount Robson	3,954	12,972	2,829	9,281	1913	South face (UIAA IV)	53°6′38″N 119°9′24″W
2	Resplendent Mountain	3,425	11,237	483	1,585	1911	North face (UIAA II)	53°5′15″N 119°5′53″W
3	The Helmet	3,420	11,220	128	420	1928		53°6′54″N 119°8′30″W
4	Lynx Mountain	3,192	10,472	440	1,440	1913		53°7′35″N 119°2′53″W
5	Mount Waffl	2,913	9,557	163	535	Unk		53°7′27″N 119°8′6″W
6	Tatei Ridge	2,911	9,551	80	260	Unk	Tatei is the Stoney Indian word for "wind"	53°9′39″N 119°4′46″W
7	Mount Kain	2,863	9,393	239	784	1934	Basic rock climb	53°3′8″N 119°2′25″W
8	Titkana Peak	2,827	9,275	397	1,302	1908		53°9′18″N 119°3′54″W
9	Rearguard Mountain	2,744	9,003	454	1,490	1913	Glacier travel, scramble	53°8′38″N 119°7′35″W
10	Razor Peak	2,682	8,799	656	2,152	Unk		53°1′49″N 118°58′7″W
11	Extinguisher Tower	2,433	7,982	48	157	Unk		53°7′10″N 119°5′44″W
12	Campion Mountain	2,137	7,011	75	246	Unk		53°3′10″N 119°9′40″W
