= Mount Darrah =

Mountain in the country of Canada

- Location within Alberta Location within British Columbia Location within Canada

Highest point
- Elevation: 2,755 m (9,039 ft)
- Prominence: 428 m (1,404 ft)
- Listing: Mountains of Alberta; Mountains of British Columbia
- Coordinates: 49°28′22″N 114°35′37″W

Geography
- Country: Canada
- Provinces: Alberta and British Columbia
- Parent range: Flathead Range
- Topo map: NTS 82G7 Flathead Ridge

Climbing
- First ascent: 1914 Interprovincial Boundary Commission

Mount Darrah is located on the border of Alberta and British Columbia on the Continental Divide. It was named in 1916 after Captain Darrah.

== See also ==
- List of peaks on the British Columbia–Alberta border
