= Resplendent Mountain =

Mountain in BC, Canada

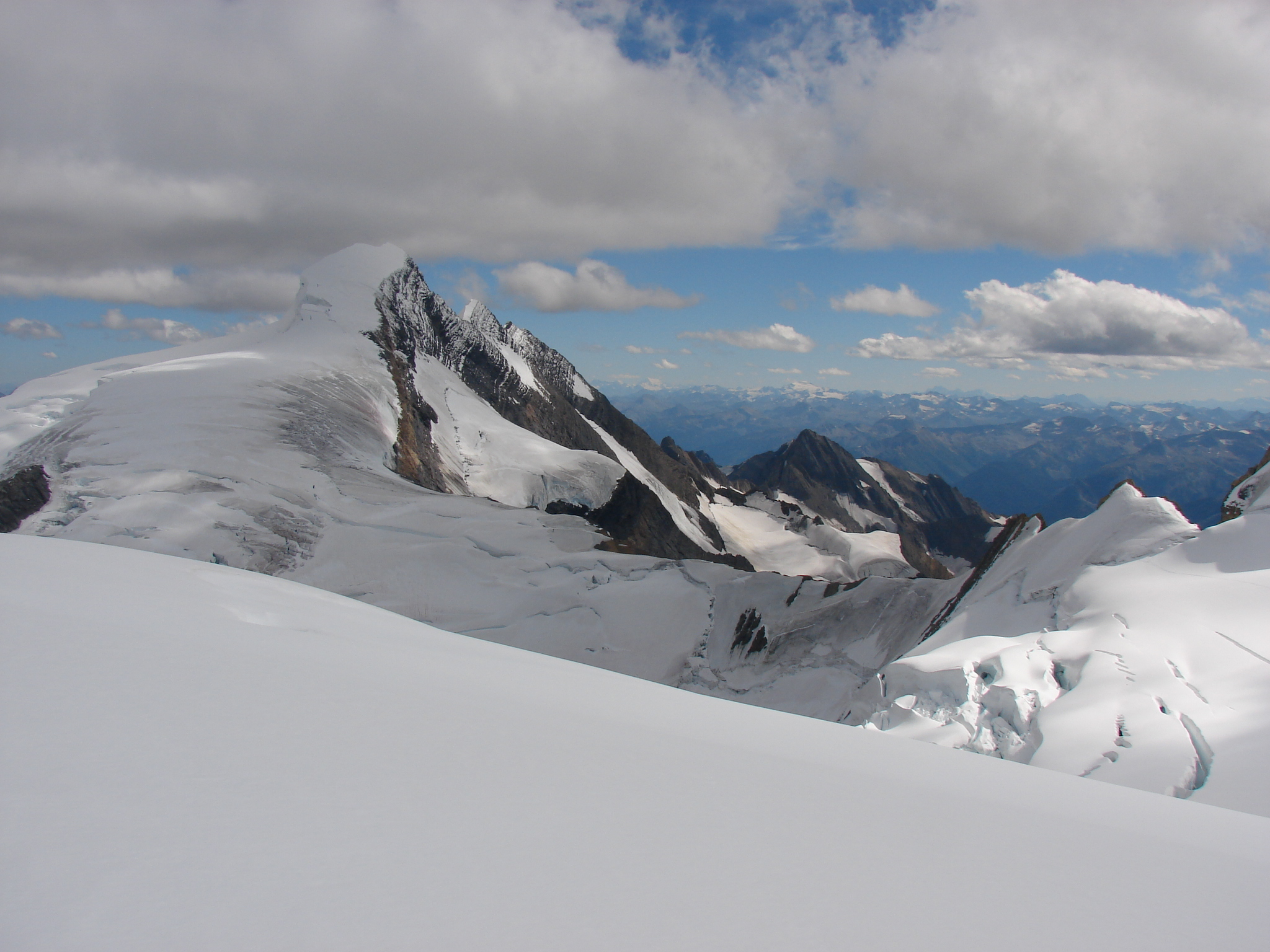
- View of Resplendent from the Dome, upper Robson glacier

Highest point
- Elevation: 3,425 m (11,237 ft)
- Prominence: 483 m (1,585 ft)
- Parent peak: Mount Robson
- Listing: Mountains of British Columbia
- Coordinates: 53°05′15″N 119°05′53″W

Geography
- Location within British Columbia
- Country: Canada
- Province: British Columbia
- District: Cariboo Land District
- Parent range: Rainbow Range
- Topo map: NTS 83E3 Mount Robson

Climbing
- First ascent: 1911, Byron Harmon and Conrad Kain
- Easiest route: NW slopes, II

Resplendent Mountain, or Mount Resplendent is a peak in the Canadian Rockies, located at the northern end of Mount Robson Provincial Park in British Columbia, Canada. It is a part of the Rainbow Range, and is a sister peak to the more famous Mount Robson, its nearest neighbour. Together they form a classic panorama seen by travellers on Via Rail trains and Highway 16. The mountain was named by Arthur P. Coleman, and Arthur O. Wheeler wrote, "On the east side it is clad from top to bottom in pure white snow, and presents with the sun shining upon it a spectacle of such wonderful brilliance that the aptness of the name became immediately apparent." The first ascent was achieved on the same historic 1911 trip in which Conrad Kain first scouted the climbing routes later to be used on the first ascent of Mount Robson.

The east face of Resplendent towers above the sources of Resplendent Creek, feeding into the Moose River, and its north face emerges from the Robson Glacier, feeding the Robson River, another tributary of the upper headwaters of the Fraser River.

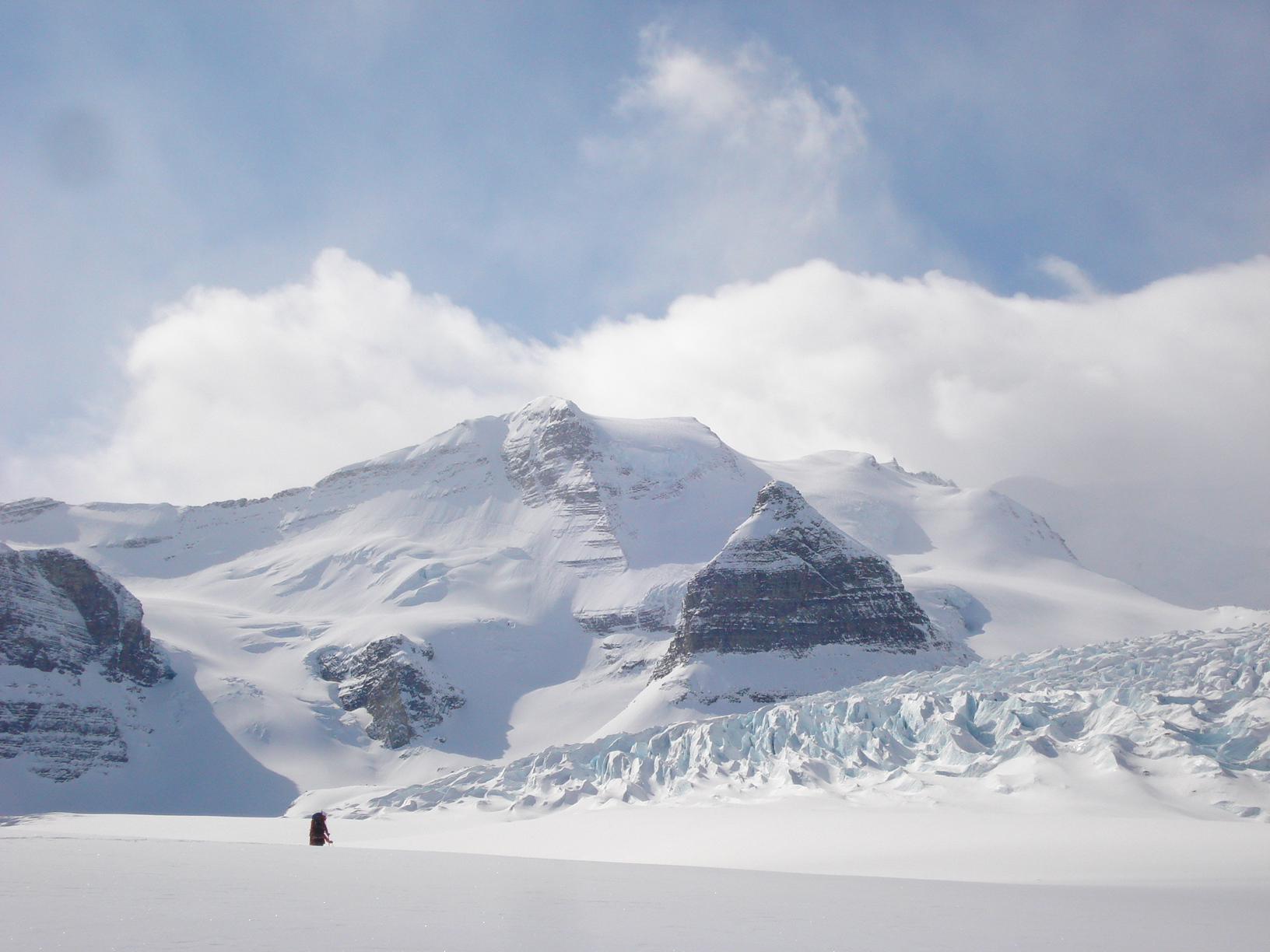
Resplendent from the north in winter

Resplendent holds an important place in the history of Canadian Rockies ski mountaineering, and from the time of Peter L. Parson's first ski ascent (solo) in 1930, it has been a highly sought objective for winter ascents, with a ski descent of over 1800 metres from the summit to the toe of the Robson Glacier.
