= Lizard Range =

Mountain range in British Columbia, Canada

- Location within British Columbia

Highest point
- Elevation: 2,360 m (7,740 ft)
- Coordinates: 49°30′29″N 115°13′55″W

Geography
- Country: Canada
- Province: British Columbia
- Parent range: Canadian Rockies
- Topo map: NTS 82G11 Fernie

The Lizard Range is a mountain range southwest of Fernie, British Columbia in the Canadian Rockies. The range is home to the Fernie Alpine Resort and parts of the Mount Fernie Provincial Park.

The range is located north of the Kootenay River and the Rocky Mountain Trench, south of Lizard Creek, west of the Elk River and east of the Bull River. It reaches elevations of up to 2,360 metres (7,740 ft). The range is 31 kilometers (19 mi) wide and 44 kilometres (27 mi) long.

== See also ==
- Ranges of the Canadian Rockies
