= Mount Ptolemy (Canada) =

Mountain in Alberta and British Columbia, Canada

- Location within Alberta Location within British Columbia Location within Canada

Highest point
- Elevation: 2,815 m (9,236 ft)
- Prominence: 885 m (2,904 ft)
- Listing: Mountains of Alberta; Mountains of British Columbia
- Coordinates: 49°32′56″N 114°37′52″W

Geography
- Country: Canada
- Provinces: Alberta and British Columbia
- District: Kootenay Land District
- Parent range: Flathead Range
- Topo map: NTS 82G10 Crowsnest

Mount Ptolemy is the highest mountain of the Flathead Range and is located on the Continental Divide along the provincial borders of Alberta and British Columbia. Situated 10 km (6.2 mi) southeast of Crowsnest Pass and 5 km (3 mi) northeast of Corbin, it is Alberta's 57th most prominent mountain. It was named in 1914 by Arthur Wheeler for its resemblance to a man sitting with folded arms. The mountain has also been known as Mummy Mountain.

== See also ==
- List of peaks on the Alberta–British Columbia border
