= Robson Glacier =

Glacier in Canada

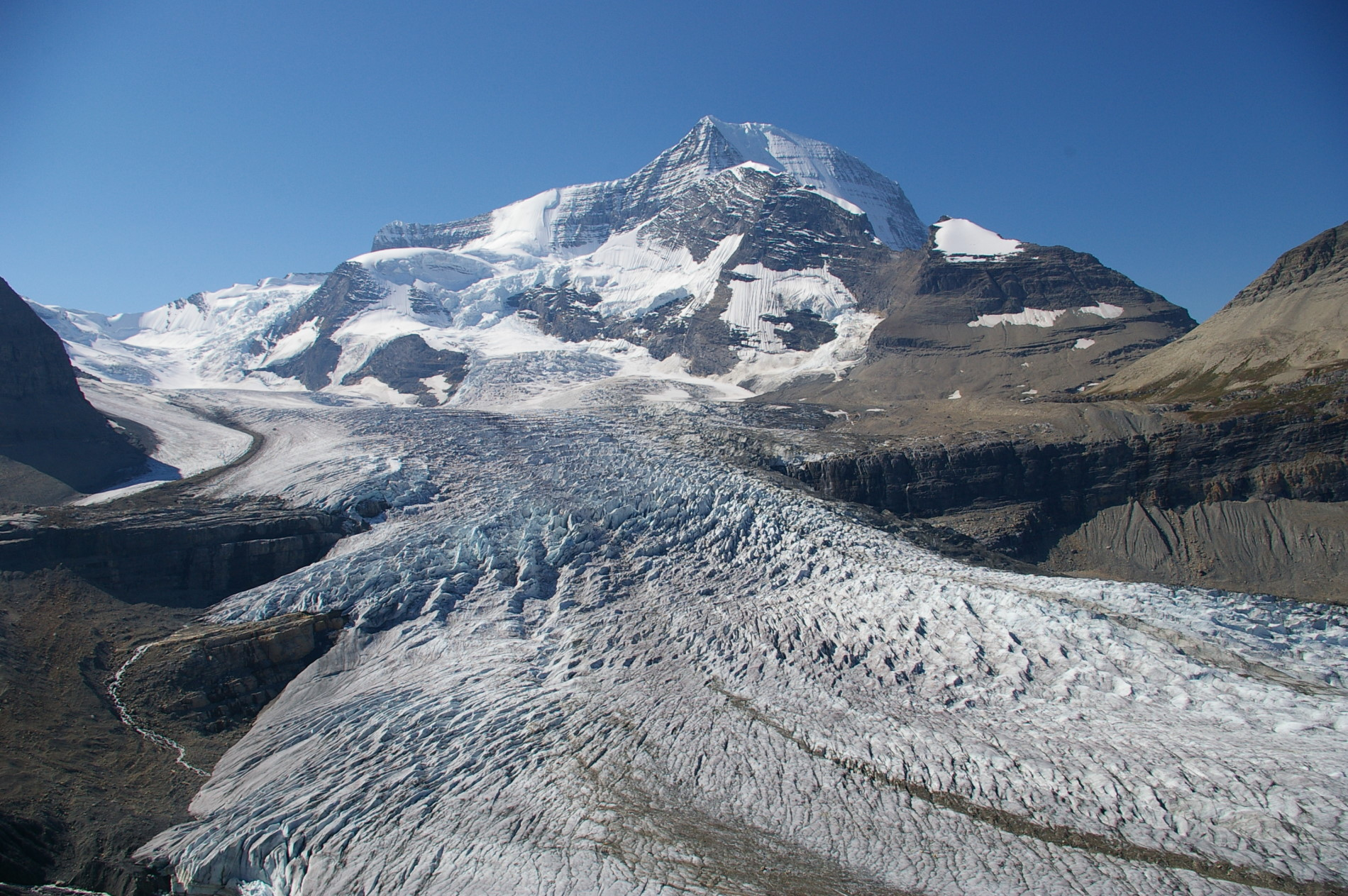
- Looking up the Robson Glacier to the summit of Mount Robson.

- Location within Alberta Location within British Columbia Location within Canada
- Interactive map of Robson Glacier
- Location: Alberta, Canada
- Coordinates: 53°08′00″N 119°06′00″W

The Robson Glacier is the primary source of the short Robson River, one of the uppermost tributaries of the Fraser River. Located on the British Columbia-Alberta Boundary and the Continental Divide to the east of Berg Lake in Mount Robson Provincial Park, it sits on the northeast flank of Mount Robson in Mount Robson Provincial Park, British Columbia in the Canadian Rockies. Its meltwater feeds unofficially named Robson Lake, whose outlet marks the start of the Robson River.

== See also ==
- List of glaciers
