= Mount Robson =

Mountain in British Columbia, Canada

- Yexyexéscen (Shuswap)
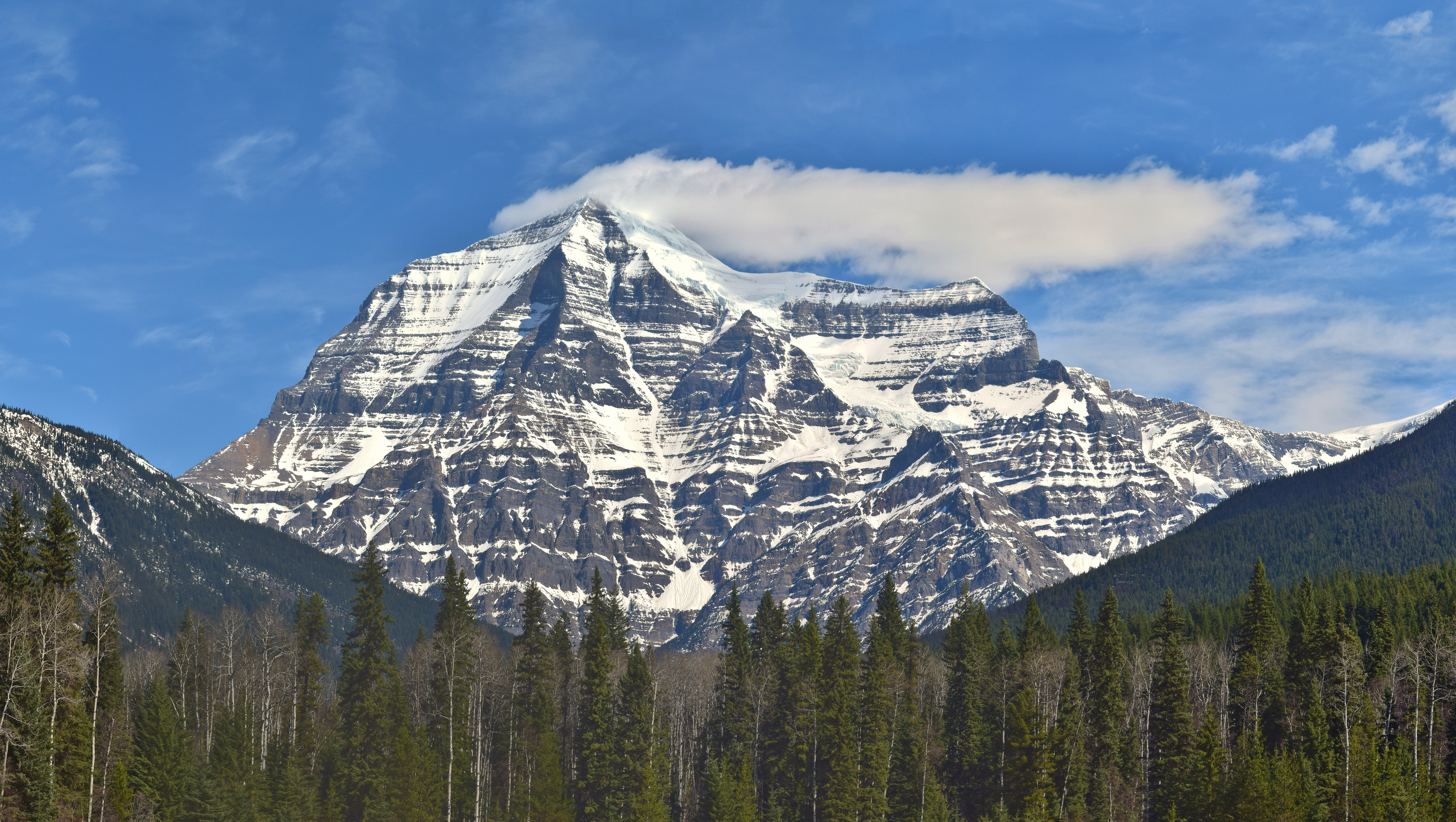

Highest point
- Elevation: 3,954 m (12,972 ft)
- Prominence: 2,829 m (9,281 ft)
- Isolation: 460 km (290 mi)
- Listing: World most prominent peaks 119th; North America prominent peaks 21st; North America isolated peaks 39th; Canada highest major peaks 21st; Canada most prominent peaks 7th; Canada most isolated peaks 14th
- Coordinates: 53°06′38″N 119°09′23″W

Naming
- Nickname: Cloud Cap Mountain
- Native name: Yexyexéscen (Shuswap)
- English translation: Striped Rock

Geography
- Location within British Columbia
- Country: Canada
- Province: British Columbia
- District: Cariboo Land District
- Parent range: Rainbow Range (Canadian Rockies)
- Topo map: NTS 83E3 Mount Robson

Climbing
- First ascent: July 31, 1913 by William W. Foster, Albert H. McCarthy and Conrad Kain
- Easiest route: South face (UIAA IV)

Mount Robson is the most prominent mountain in North America's Rocky Mountain range; it is also the highest point in the Canadian Rockies. The mountain is located entirely within Mount Robson Provincial Park of British Columbia, and is part of the Rainbow Range. Mount Robson is the second highest peak entirely in British Columbia, behind Mount Waddington in the Coast Range. The south face of Mount Robson is clearly visible from the Yellowhead Highway (Highway 16), and is commonly photographed along this route.

Mount Robson was likely named after Colin Robertson, who worked for both the North West Company and the Hudson's Bay Company at various times in the early 19th century, though there was confusion over the name as many assumed it to have been named for John Robson, an early premier of British Columbia. The Texqa’kallt, a Secwepemc people and the earliest known inhabitants of the area, call it Yexyexéscen (striped rock), spelled in Dawson 1891 as Yuh-hai-has-kun, The Mountain of the Spiral Road. Other unofficial names include Cloud Cap Mountain.

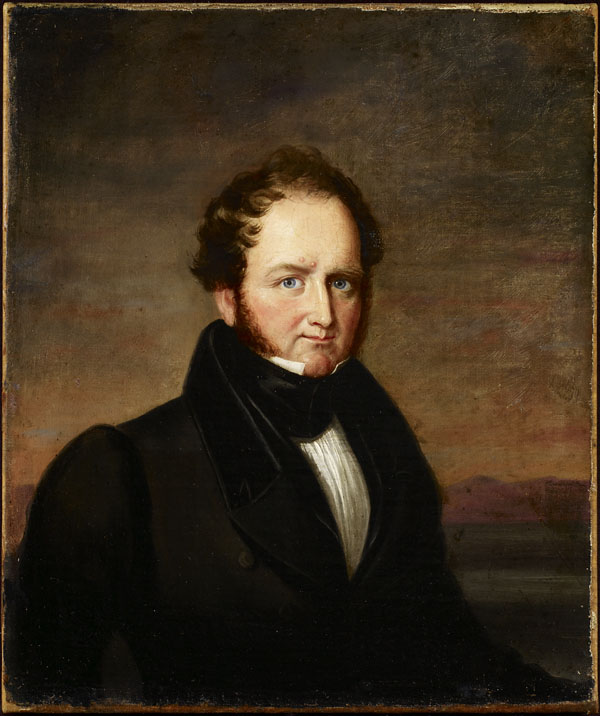
Colin Robertson

== Geography and climate ==
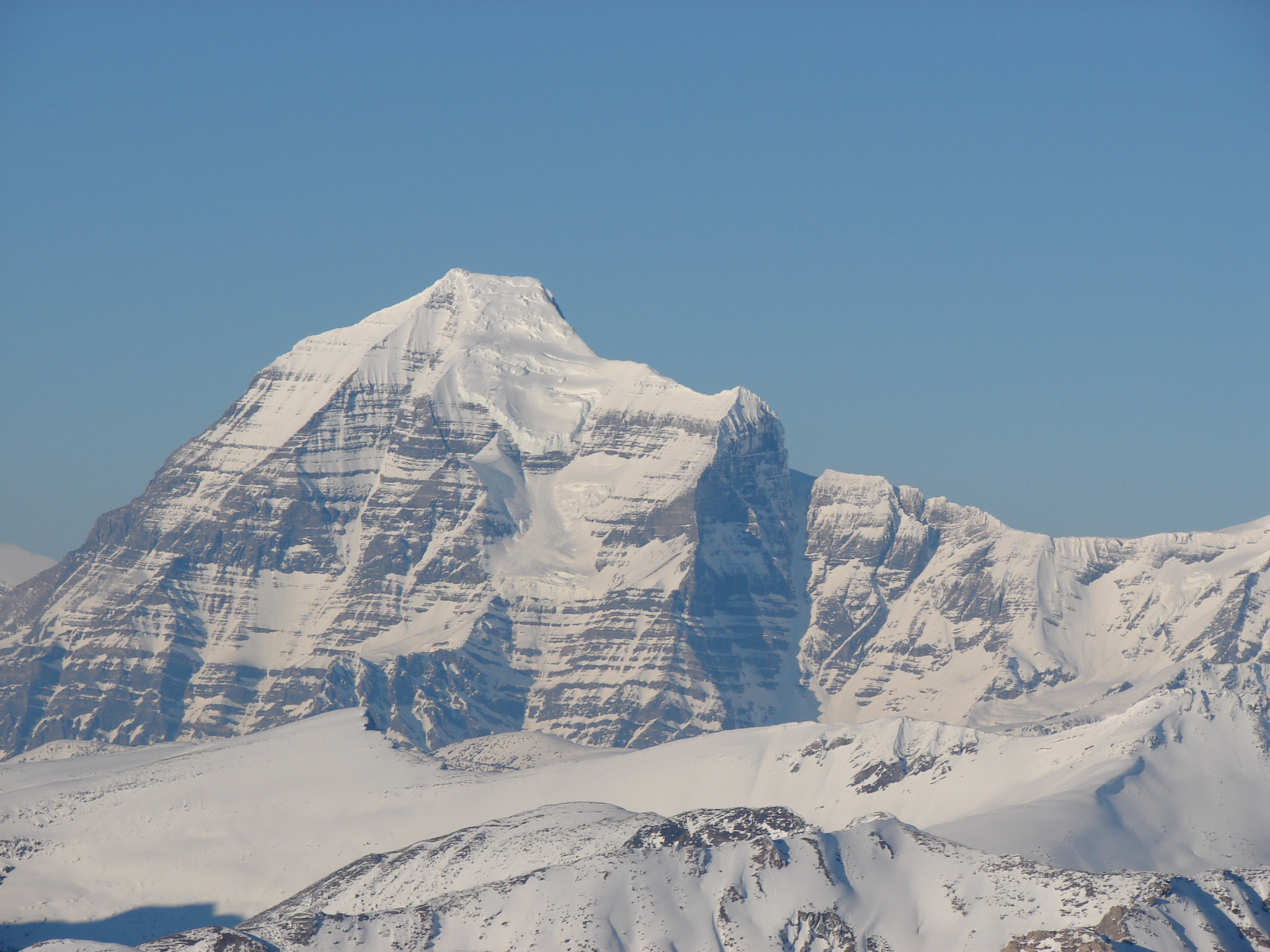
Upper SE face seen from the Selwyn Range

Mount Robson boasts great vertical relief over the local terrain. From Kinney Lake, the south-west side of the mountain rises 2,975 m (9,760 ft) to the summit. The north face of Mount Robson is heavily glaciated and 800 m (2,600 ft) of ice extends from the summit to the Berg Glacier.

The north face can be seen from Berg Lake, and reached by a 19 km (12 mi) hike. The lake is approximately 2 km long and lies at 1,646 m (5,400 ft) elevation. There are backcountry campgrounds at each end of the lake and a log shelter on its banks, named Hargreaves Shelter in honor of the Hargreaves family who operated the Mount Robson Ranch across the Fraser River from the mountain and who outfitted most of the early trips into Berg Lake. The Berg Glacier calves directly into the lake. The Robson Glacier, which fills the cirque and valley between Mount Robson and Mount Resplendent, in the early 1900s fed directly into both Berg lake and Adolphus Lake, straddling the Continental Divide and draining thus to both the Arctic and Pacific oceans via the Smoky and Robson Rivers, respectively. It since has receded more than 2 kilometres and is the source of the Robson River only. The peak of Mount Robson has a tundra climate (ET).

Climate data for Mount Robson Peak 1981-2010 (53.110 -119.156)
Month	Jan	Feb	Mar	Apr	May	Jun	Jul	Aug	Sep	Oct	Nov	Dec	Year
Mean daily maximum °C (°F)	−9.3 (15.3)	−7.8 (18.0)	−6.3 (20.7)	−3.0 (26.6)	−0.5 (31.1)	3.3 (37.9)	6.7 (44.1)	7.1 (44.8)	7.3 (45.1)	0.7 (33.3)	−5.8 (21.6)	−7.9 (17.8)	−1.3 (29.7)
Daily mean °C (°F)	−12.9 (8.8)	−12.2 (10.0)	−10.7 (12.7)	−7.6 (18.3)	−2.1 (28.2)	1.6 (34.9)	4.9 (40.8)	5.1 (41.2)	2.9 (37.2)	−4.4 (24.1)	−10.7 (12.7)	−12.5 (9.5)	−4.9 (23.2)
Mean daily minimum °C (°F)	−16.5 (2.3)	−16.7 (1.9)	−15.1 (4.8)	−12.2 (10.0)	−3.6 (25.5)	−0.2 (31.6)	3.0 (37.4)	3.2 (37.8)	−1.4 (29.5)	−9.5 (14.9)	−15.6 (3.9)	−17.2 (1.0)	−8.5 (16.7)
Average precipitation mm (inches)	271 (10.7)	257 (10.1)	238 (9.4)	153 (6.0)	134 (5.3)	157 (6.2)	157 (6.2)	173 (6.8)	234 (9.2)	307 (12.1)	357 (14.1)	175 (6.9)	2,613 (103)
Source: http://www.climatewna.com/ClimateBC_Map.aspx

== History ==
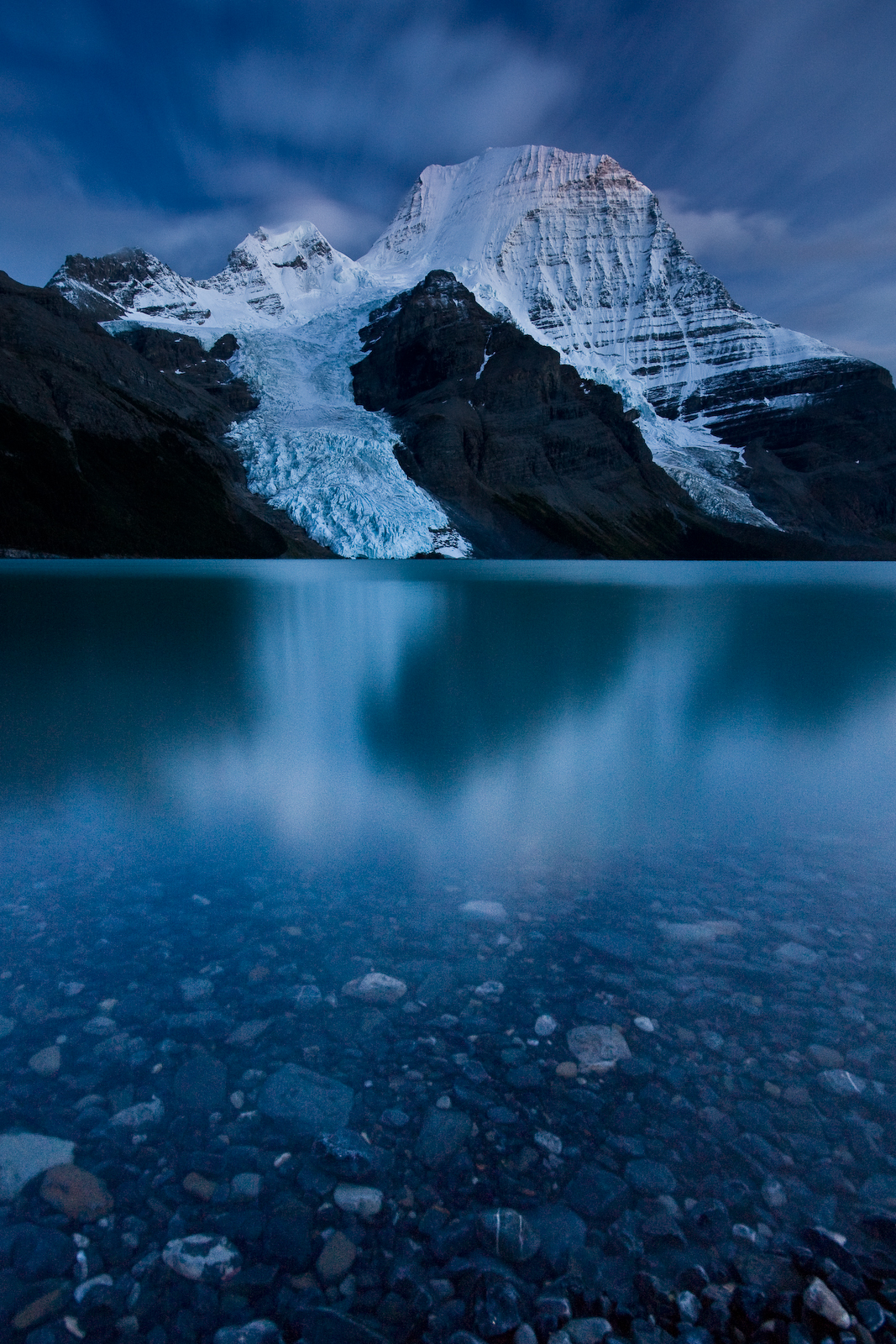
Mount Robson in British Columbia.

In 1893, 5 years after the expedition of A.P. Coleman to Athabasca Pass and the final settling of the mistaken elevations of Mount Hooker and Mount Brown, Mount Robson was first surveyed by James McEvoy and determined to be the highest peak in the Canadian Rockies. The first documented ascent of Mount Robson, led by the young guide Conrad Kain, at its time the hardest ice face to be climbed on the continent, was achieved during the 1913 annual expedition organized by a large party of Alpine Club of Canada members who made use of the newly completed Grand Trunk Pacific railway to access the area. Prior to 1913, it had been necessary to approach the mountain by pack train from Edmonton or Laggan via Jasper and Lucerne, so only a few intrepid explorers had made previous attempts at exploring the mountain. The most famous early ascensionist was George Kinney, a founding member of the Alpine Club, who on his twelfth attempt in August 1909 claimed to have reached the summit with local outfitter Donald "Curly" Phillips. A major controversy over this claim and over the implausible nature of his unlikely and dangerous route dominated the discourse within the Alpine Club elite, and he is now generally presumed to have reached the high summit ridge before being turned back at the final ice dome of the peak. Kinney Lake, below the south face, is named in his honour.

== Climbing ==
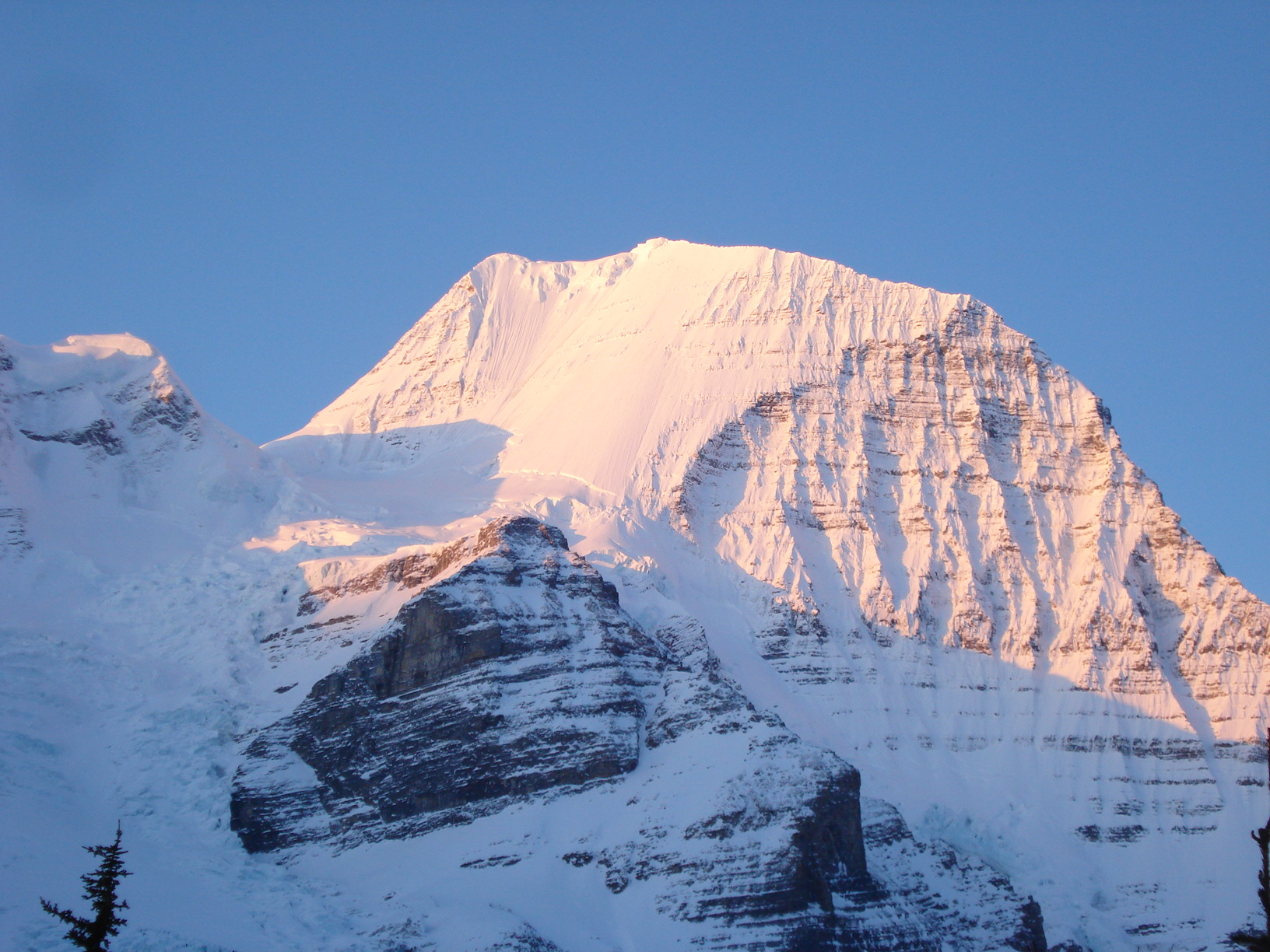
The North face (left) and Emperor face (right) in winter

The 1,500 m (4,900 ft) Emperor Face on the northwest side provides the most formidable challenge to elite climbers on the mountain, though the more popular routes are the Kain route and the southeast face. The Kain route is the line taken on the mountain's first ascent. It follows the entire length of the Robson Glacier from its terminus above Robson Pass to the upper northeast face and the summit ridge. Mount Robson has a high failure rate on climbing to the top, with only about 10% of attempts being successful.

Although the mountain is under 4,000 m (13,000 ft), there is no easy way to the summit and bad weather commonly rebuffs summit attempts, in some years there are no successful ascents because the conditions are simply not suitable.

The main routes on Mount Robson include:

- South Face (Normal Route) IV (also first ascended by Conrad Kain, in 1924)
- Kain Face IV (named after Conrad Kain)
- Wishbone Arete IV 5.6
- Emperor Ridge V 5.6
- Emperor Face, Stump/Logan VI 5.9 A2
- Emperor Face, Cheesmond/Dick VI 5.9 A2
- Emperor Face, Infinite Patience VI WI5 M5 5.9
- Emperor Face, House-Haley M7
- North Face IV
- Fuhrer Ridge IV 5.4 (named after Hans Fuhrer)

== See also ==
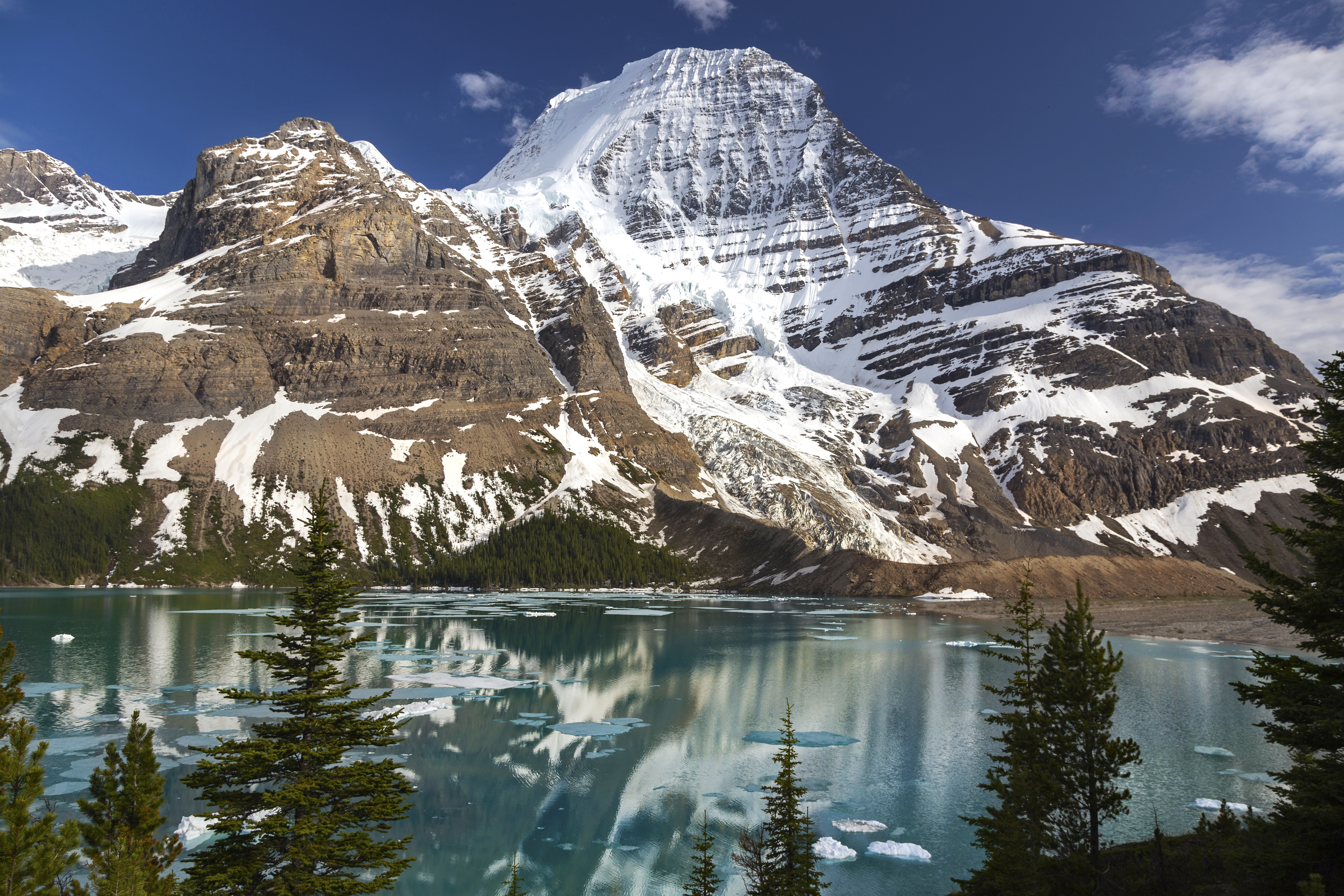
Berg Lake and Robson

- List of mountains in the Canadian Rockies
- Mountain peaks of Canada
- Mountain peaks of the Rocky Mountains
- Mountain peaks of North America
- Rocky Mountains
- List of Ultras of Canada (mountains with over 1,500m of prominence)
- Conrad Kain (first person to climb Mount Robson)
