= Jasper Lake (Alberta) =

Lake in Alberta, Canada

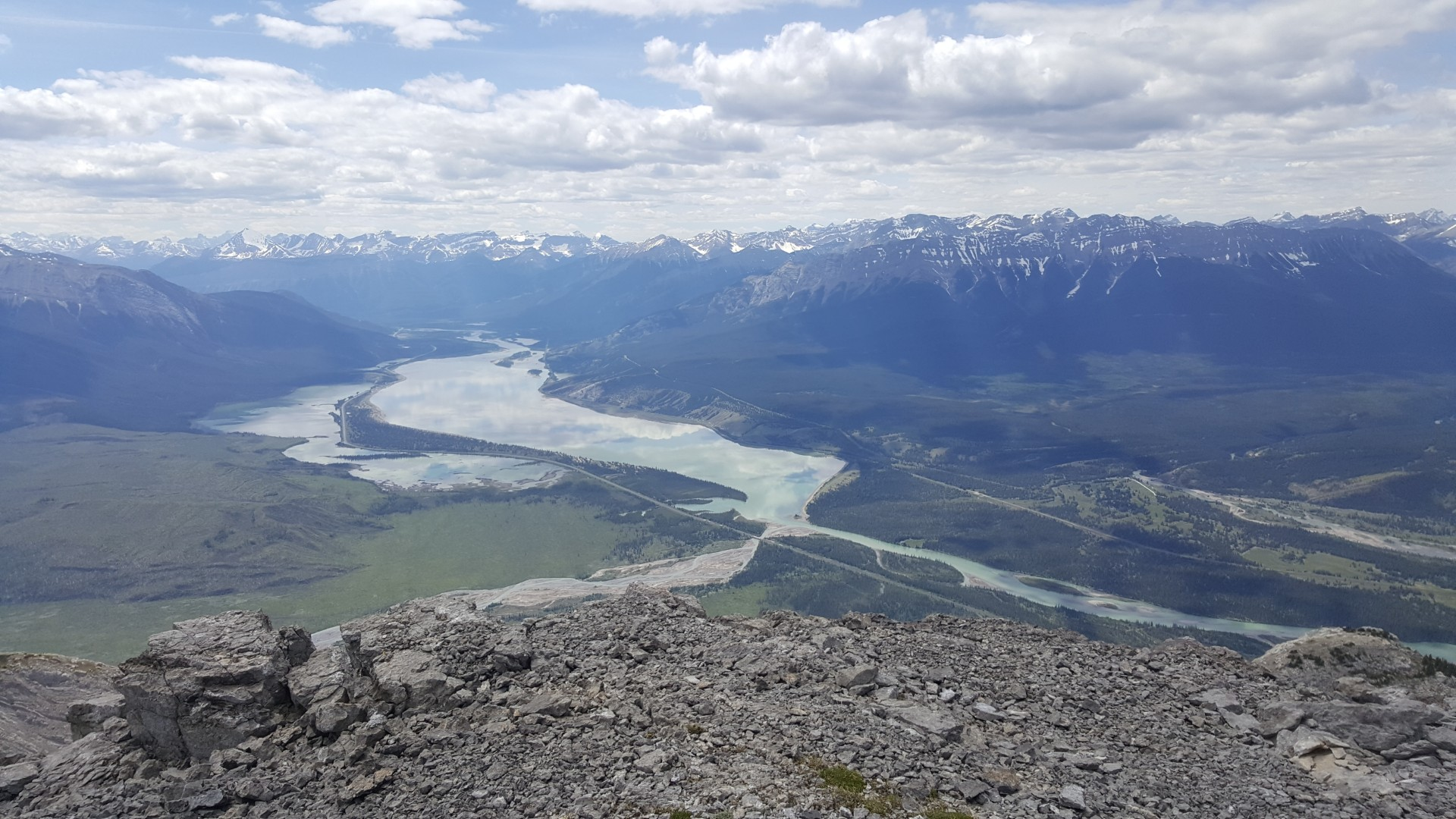
- Jasper Lake and mountains across the shore as seen from the train

- Location within Alberta Location within Canada
- Location: Jasper National Park, Alberta, Canada
- Coordinates: 53°5′N 118°2′W
- Primary inflows: Athabasca River
- Primary outflows: Athabasca River
- Basin countries: Canada
- Max. length: 6 mi (9.7 km)
- Max. width: 1–3 mi (1.6–4.8 km)

Jasper Lake is in the Rocky Mountains of Jasper National Park in Alberta, Canada. It is part of the Athabasca River, where the river broadens out. Its westernmost shore lies about 24 kilometres (15 mi) northeast from the town of Jasper along the Yellowhead Highway (Highway 16) and stretches farther east for about 9.7 km (6 mi).

== Jasper Lake Sand Dunes ==
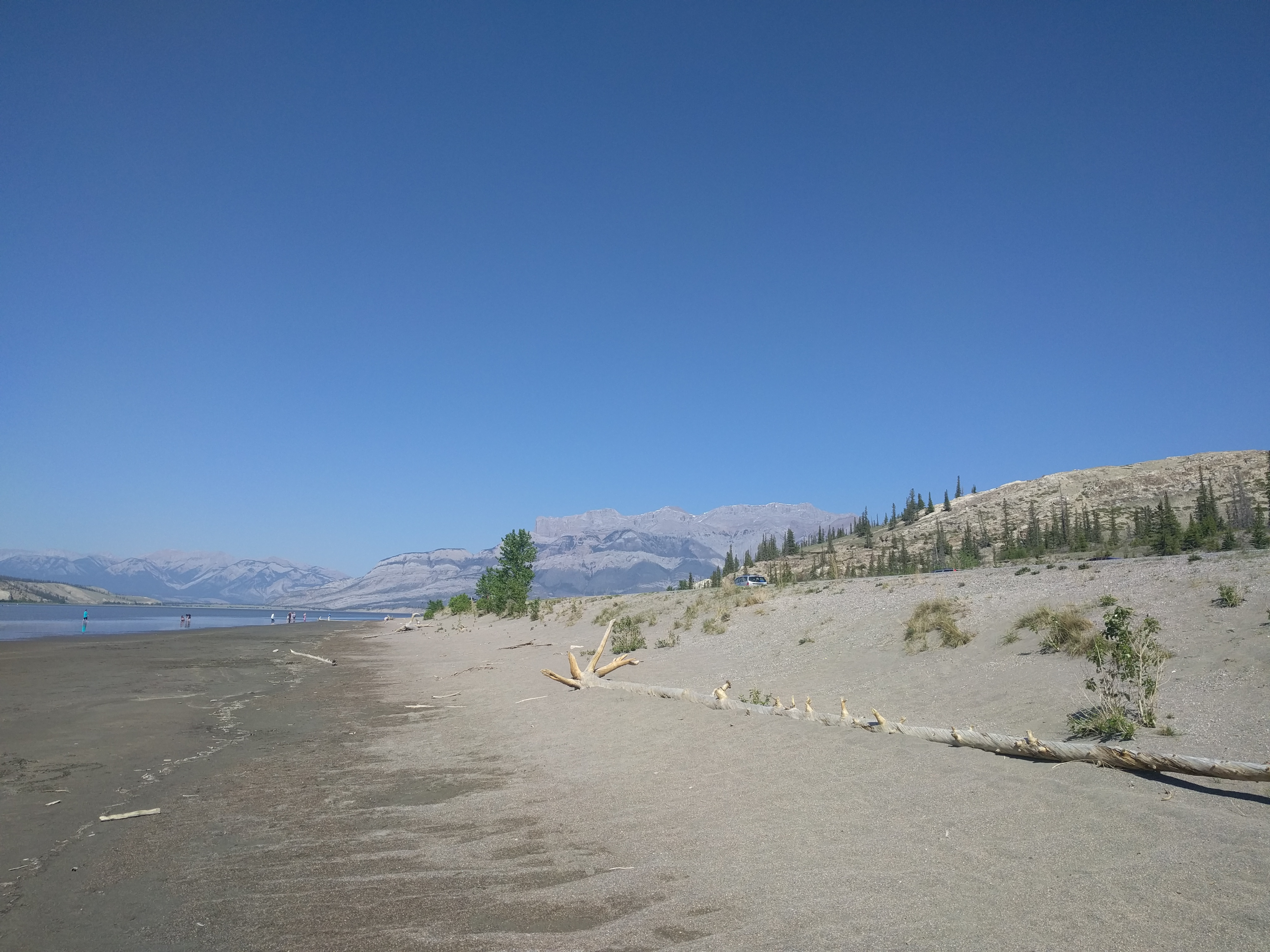
Jasper Lake from the southeast shore.

A distinctive feature of the lake is the Jasper Lake Sand Dunes, the only sand dune ecosystem in the Canadian Rockies.

The dunes were formed at the edge of the lake during the last ice age and have been constantly reshaped by wind and water ever since. Acting as a kind of sieve, the lake removes silt and sand from the river, allowing it to sink to the lake bed. When the water level recedes in the fall, vast sand flats are exposed and dry out, becoming vulnerable to the strong westerly winds that sweep through the lower Athabasca Valley. In winter, these winds blow the sand and silt down the valley, forming two large dune islands near the northwest shore of Jasper Lake. In the lee of the dunes, mature clumps of spruce and balsam poplar have gained a foothold, with colonizing grasses, rose bushes and willows.

== Surrounded by mountains ==
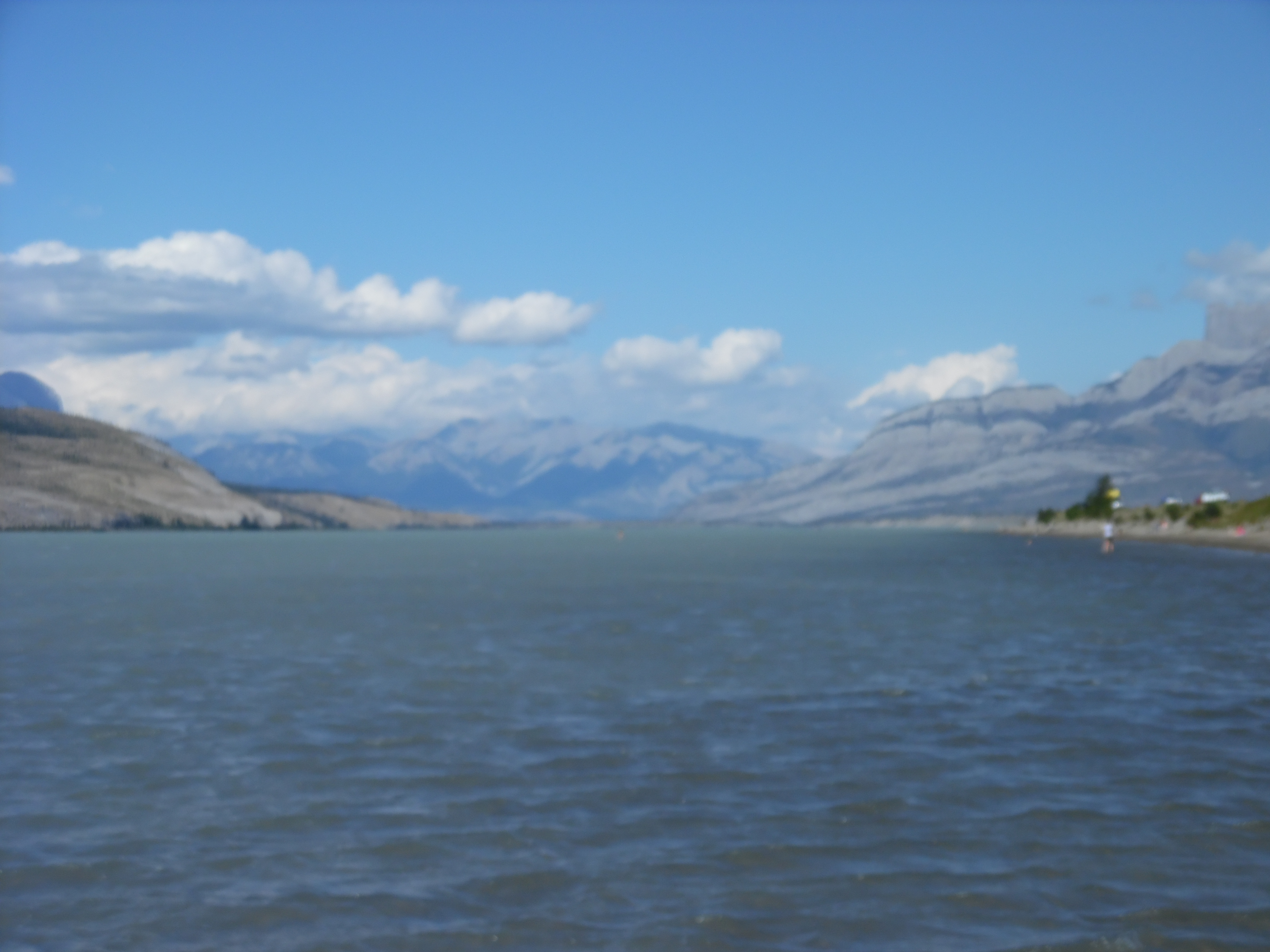
Jasper Lake from the southeast shore, looking northwest.

The lake is surrounded by mountain ranges, many of which can be seen from various parts along the lake. From southeast to southwest:

- Miette Range. Most prominent peaks include Utopia Mountain (2,602 m or 8,537 ft) and Roche Miette (2,316 m or 7,598 ft).
- Jacques Range. Prominent peaks: Cinquefoil Mountain (2,259 m or 7,411 ft), Roche Jacques (2,603 m or 8,540 ft), and Mount Merlin (2,711 m or 8,894 ft).
- Colin Range: Peaks include Mount Colin (2,687 m or 8,816 ft)

Northwest to northeast:

- Victoria Cross Ranges—so named because six of the peaks are named after Canadian recipients of the Victoria Cross.
- De Smet Range. Prominent peaks include: Roche de Smet, (2,539 m or 8,330 ft) and Mount Greenock (2,065 m or 6,775 ft).
- Bosche Range: Mount Aeolus (2,643 m or 8,671 ft) and Roche à Bosche (2,123 m or 6,965 ft)

== Transportation corridors ==
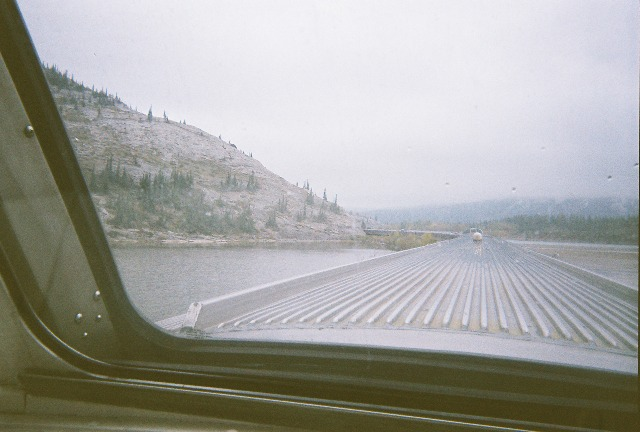
Jasper Lake as seen from Via Rail's Canadian as it crosses a causeway.

The Canadian National Railway skirts the northwestern shore of the lake. Parts it have been built on causeways away from the shore, which have created several ponds. Via Rail's passenger train the Canadian uses this same CN line for part of its journey between Toronto and Vancouver, giving passengers up-close views of the lake, sand dunes, and surrounding mountains. This area has been the site of many CN publicity photographs—including of the Super Continental—through the years, and it is still popular with photographers, railfans, advertisers, and passengers.

The Yellowhead Highway (Highway 16) skirts the southeastern shore of the lake, built on the abandoned grade of the Grand Trunk Pacific Railway, and it too has segments of its route on causeways, which have created Edna and Talbot lakes. This highway is the main east-west route through Jasper National Park.
