= Continental Ranges =

Subrange of the Canadian Rockies in Canada and the United States

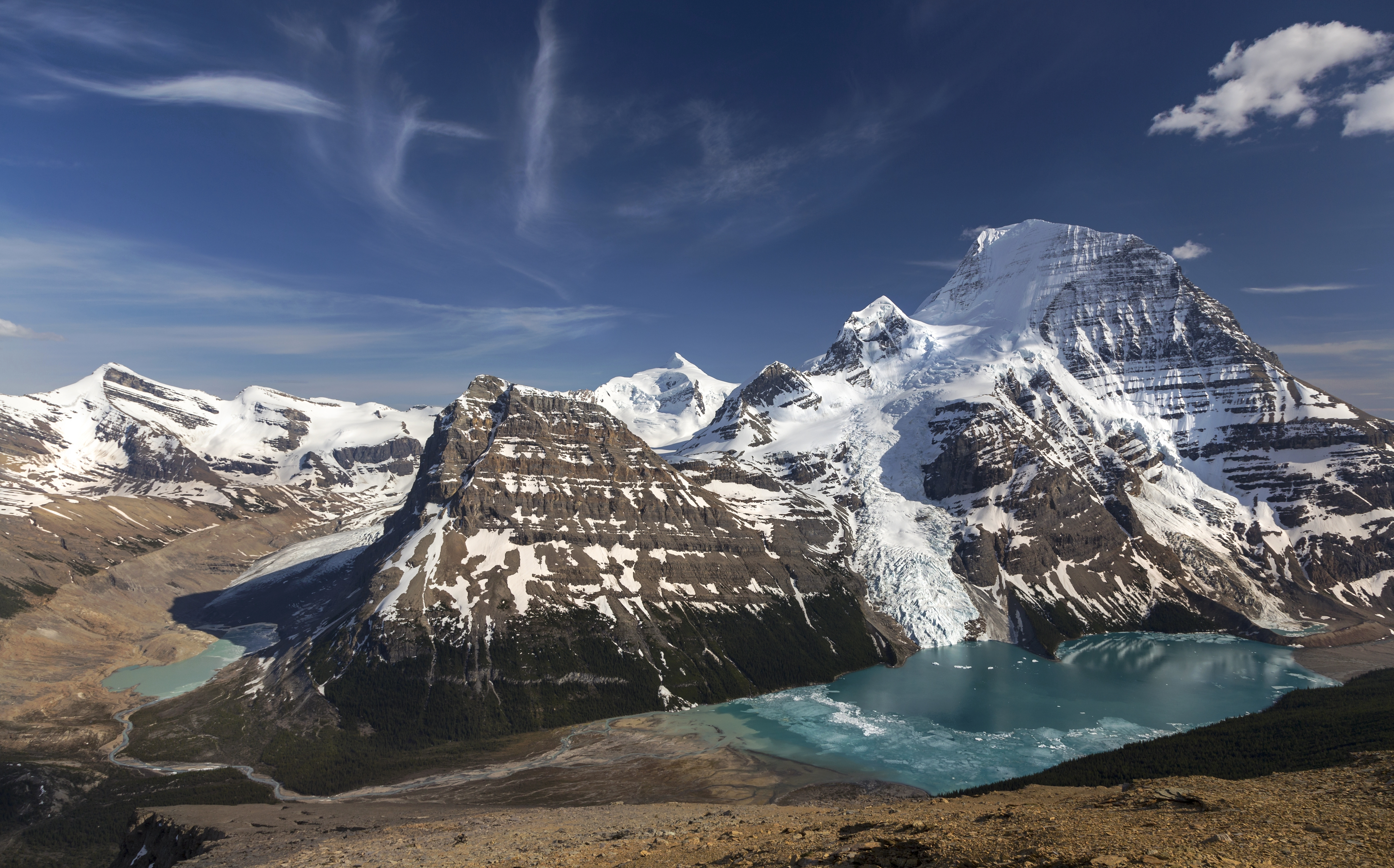
- Mt. Robson (right) in the Rainbow Range

Highest point
- Peak: Mount Robson
- Elevation: 3,954 m (12,972 ft)
- Coordinates: 53°06′38″N 119°09′24″W

Dimensions
- Area: 65,091 km^{2} (25,132 mi^{2})

Geography
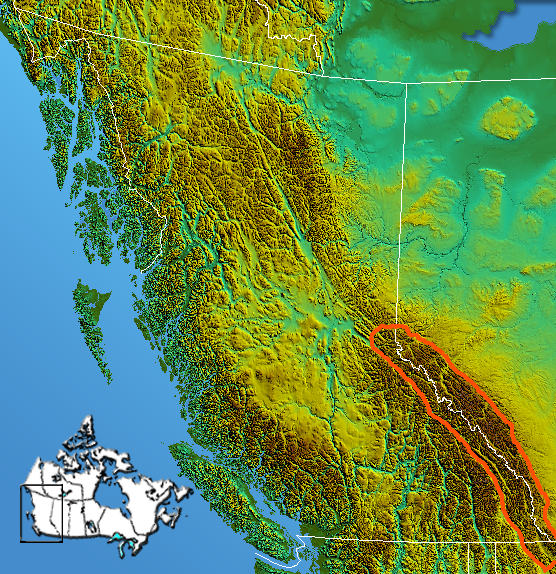
- Location map of the Continental Ranges
- Country: Canada
- Provinces: British Columbia and Alberta
- Range coordinates: 52°00′N 117°30′W
- Parent range: Canadian Rockies

The Continental Ranges are a major grouping of mountain ranges in the Rocky Mountains primarily located in the Canadian Rockies of eastern British Columbia and western Alberta, with small portions extending into the U.S. states of Idaho and Montana. It is a physiographic designation primarily geologists and is not used by the general public; it is not recognized in Alberta, and does not appear on topographic maps, although the names of its subranges (the Kootenay, Front, and the Park or Main Ranges) are in common use. It is the largest and best-known of the Canadian Rockies' three main subdivisions (the others being the Hart and Muskwa Ranges).

== Sub-ranges ==
There are three main subdivisions of the Continental Ranges: the Front Ranges, the Park Ranges, and the Kootenay Ranges. Each of those three subdivisions is further divided into individual ranges as follows:

- Front Ranges
  - Bare Range
  - Bighorn Range
  - Bosche Range
  - De Smet Range
  - Elk Range
  - Fairholme Range
  - First Range
  - Fisher Range
  - Goat Range
  - Greenhills Range
  - High Rock Range
    - Misty Range
  - Highwood Range
  - Jacques Range
  - Kananaskis Range
  - Lizard Range
  - Maligne Range
  - Miette Range
  - Murchison Group
  - Nikanassin Range
  - Opal Range
  - Palliser Range
  - Queen Elizabeth Ranges
  - Ram Range
  - Sawback Range
  - Slate Range
  - Taylor Range
  - Vermilion Range
  - Victoria Cross Ranges
  - Whitegoat Peaks
  - Wisukitsak Range
- Park Ranges, also known as the Main Ranges.
  - Blackwater Range
  - Blue Range
  - Bow Range
  - Chaba Icefield
  - Clemenceau-Chaba
  - Columbia Icefield
  - Drummond Group
  - Freshfields
  - Harrison Group
  - Hooker Icefield
  - Kitchen Range
  - Le Grand Brazeau
  - McKale-Chalco Divide
  - Mitchell Range
  - Morkill Ranges
  - Ottertail Range
  - Rainbow Range
  - Royal Group (mountain range)
  - Selwyn Range
  - Spray Mountains
  - Sundance Range
  - The Ramparts
  - Trident Range
  - Van Horne Range
  - Vermilion Range
  - Wapta Icefield
  - Waputik Icefield
  - Waputik Mountains
    - President Range
    - Waputik Range
  - Winston Churchill Range
- Kootenay Ranges
  - Beaverfoot Range
  - Brisco Range
  - Hughes Range
  - Stanford Range
  - Van Nostrand Range
