= Front Ranges =

Mountain ranges in Canada

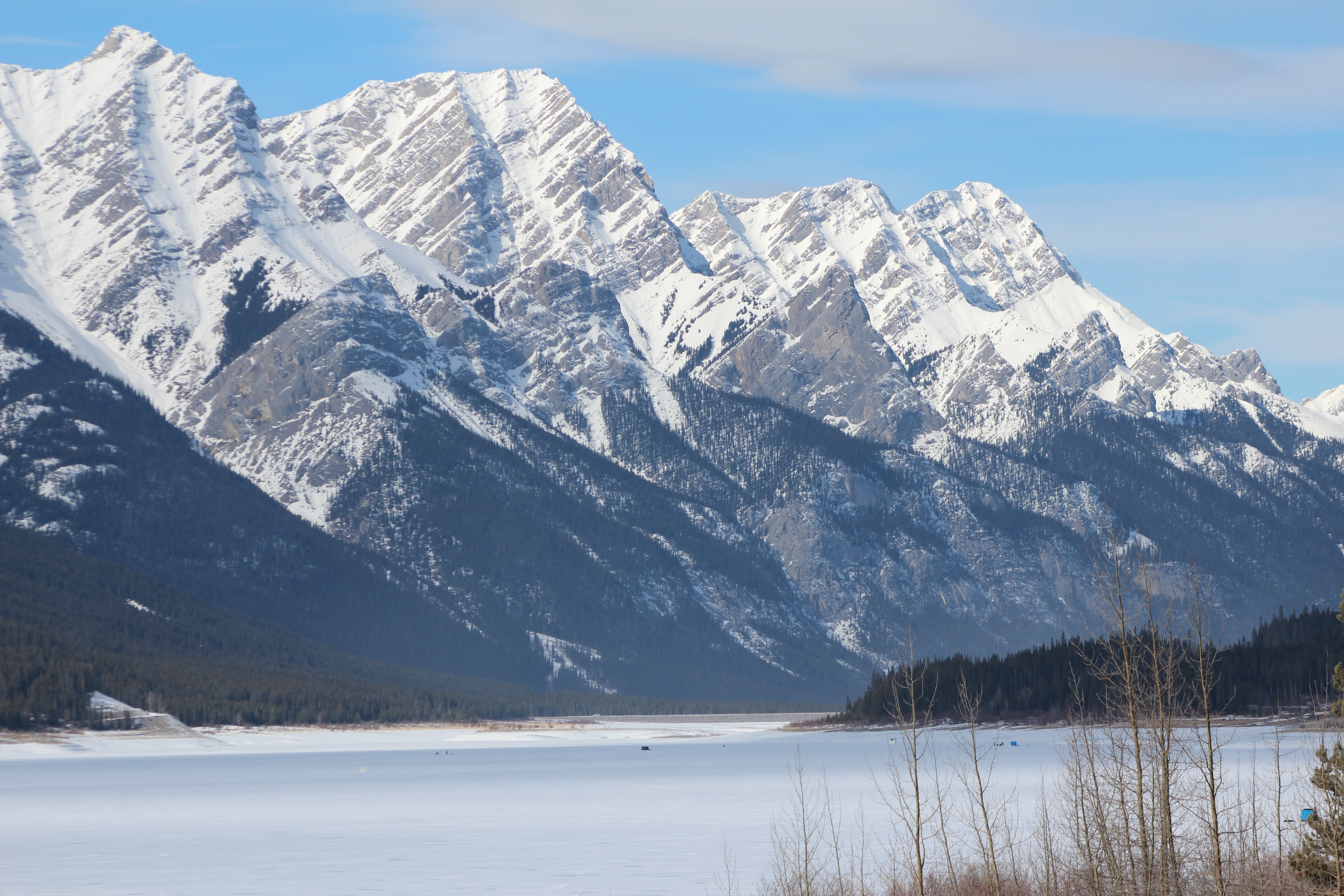
- Northern section of the Goat Range

Dimensions
- Area: 32,580 km^{2} (12,580 mi^{2})

Geography
- Country: Canada
- Provinces: British Columbia and Alberta
- Parent range: Continental Ranges

The Front Ranges are a group of mountain ranges in the Canadian Rockies of eastern British Columbia and western Alberta, Canada. It is lowest and the easternmost of the three main subranges of the Continental Ranges, located east of the Bull and Elk rivers and a fault line extending northwest of West Elk Pass to McGregor Pass.

== Subranges ==
- Bare Range
- Bighorn Range
- Bosche Range
- Cloister Mountains
- Colin Range
- De Smet Range
- Elk Range
- Fairholme Range
- Fiddle Range
- First Range
- Fisher Range
- Goat Range
- Greenhills Range
- High Rock Range
- Highwood Range
- Jacques Range
- Kananaskis Range
- Livingstone Range
- Lizard Range
- Maligne Range
- Miette Range
- Murchison Group
- Nikanassin Range
- Opal Range
- Palliser Range
- Queen Elizabeth Ranges
- Ram Range
- Sawback Range
- Slate Range
- Taylor Range
- Vermilion Range
- Victoria Cross Ranges
- Whitegoat Peaks
- Wisukitsak Range
