= Cumnock (disambiguation) =

Cumnock (Cumnag in Gaelic) is a town in East Ayrshire, Scotland. It may also refer to:

== Places ==
- Cumnock, Louisiana, United States
- Cumnock, New South Wales, Australia
- Cumnock, North Carolina, United States
- Cumnock, Ontario, Canada

Others

- Cumnock and Doon Valley (Scottish Gaelic: Cumnag agus Srath Dhùin), was one of nineteen local government districts in the Strathclyde region of Scotland from 1973 to 1996
- Cumnock and Holmhead, a police burgh of Ayrshire, Scotland
- Cumnock Formation, a geologic formation in North Carolina
- Mount Cumnock, Jasper National Park of Alberta, Canada
- New Cumnock, a town in East Ayrshire, Scotland

== People ==
- Arthur Cumnock (1868–1930), American football player
- Minnie Cumnock Blodgett (1862–1931), American philanthropist who financed establishment of a Euthenics program

== See also ==
- Cumnock RFC, a rugby union club based in East Ayrshire
