= Mount Bistre =

Mount Bistre may refer to:

- Mount Bistre (Alberta)
- Mount Bistre (Antarctica)
