= Roche Ronde =

Mountain in Alberta, Canada

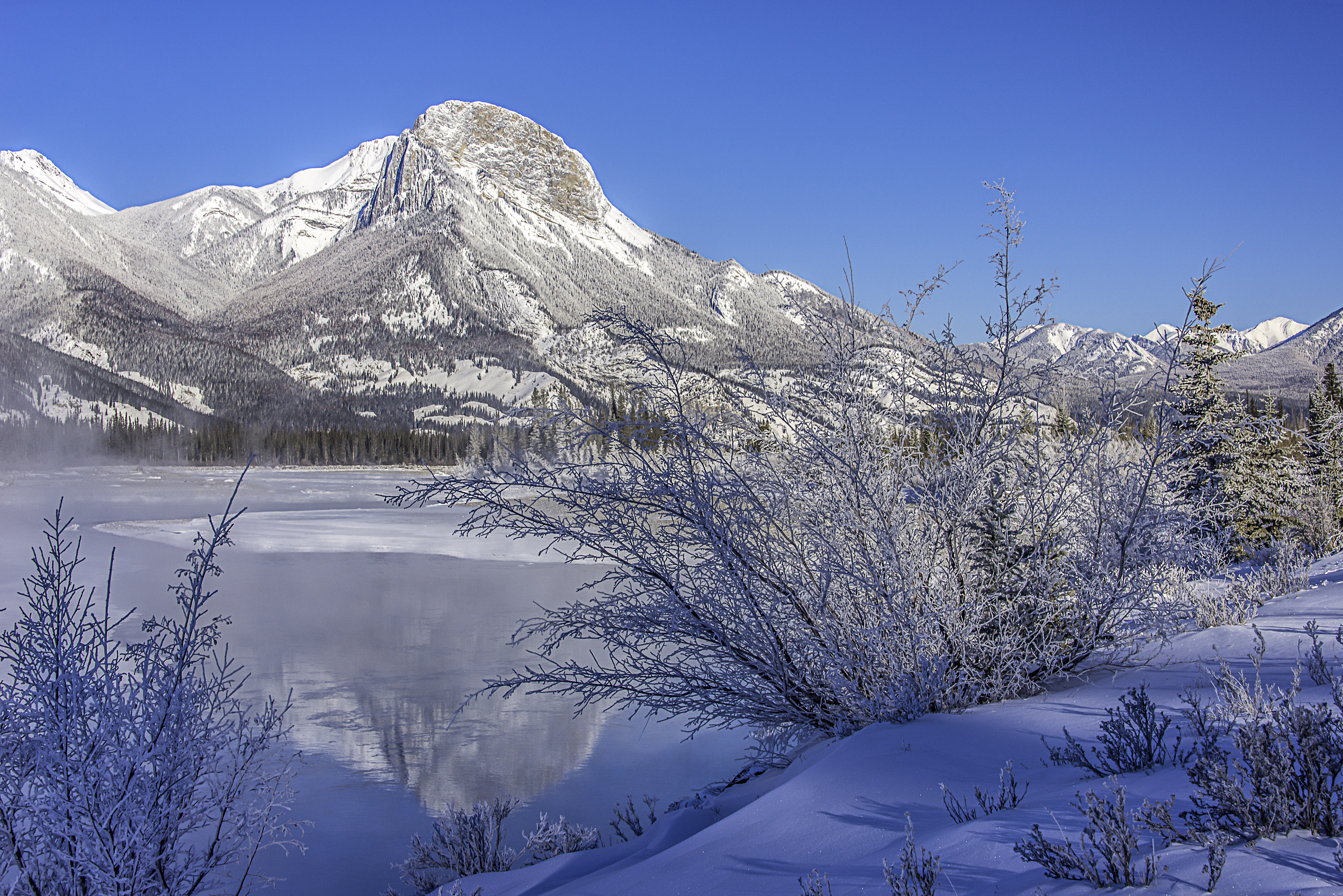
- Roche Ronde and its reflection in an open section of the Athabasca River

Highest point
- Elevation: 2,138 m (7,014 ft)
- Prominence: 96 m (315 ft)
- Parent peak: Mount Aeolus (2643 m)
- Listing: List of mountains of Alberta
- Coordinates: 53°13′12″N 118°01′00″W

Geography
- Location within Alberta
- Interactive map of Roche Ronde
- Location: Alberta, Canada
- Parent range: Bosche Range
- Topo map: NTS 83E1 Snaring River

Roche Ronde is a 2,138-metre (7,014 ft) mountain summit located at the south end of the Bosche Range in Jasper National Park, in the Canadian Rockies of Alberta, Canada. The peak may be seen from the Jasper House National Historic Site along Highway 16. The mountain was named for the rounded summit as Roche Ronde is French for "round rock".

== Climate ==
Based on the Köppen climate classification, Roche Ronde is located in a subarctic climate with cold, snowy winters, and mild summers. Temperatures can drop below −20 °C (−4 °F) with wind chill factors below −30 °C (−22 °F). Precipitation runoff from Roche Ronde drains into the Athabasca River.

== Gallery ==
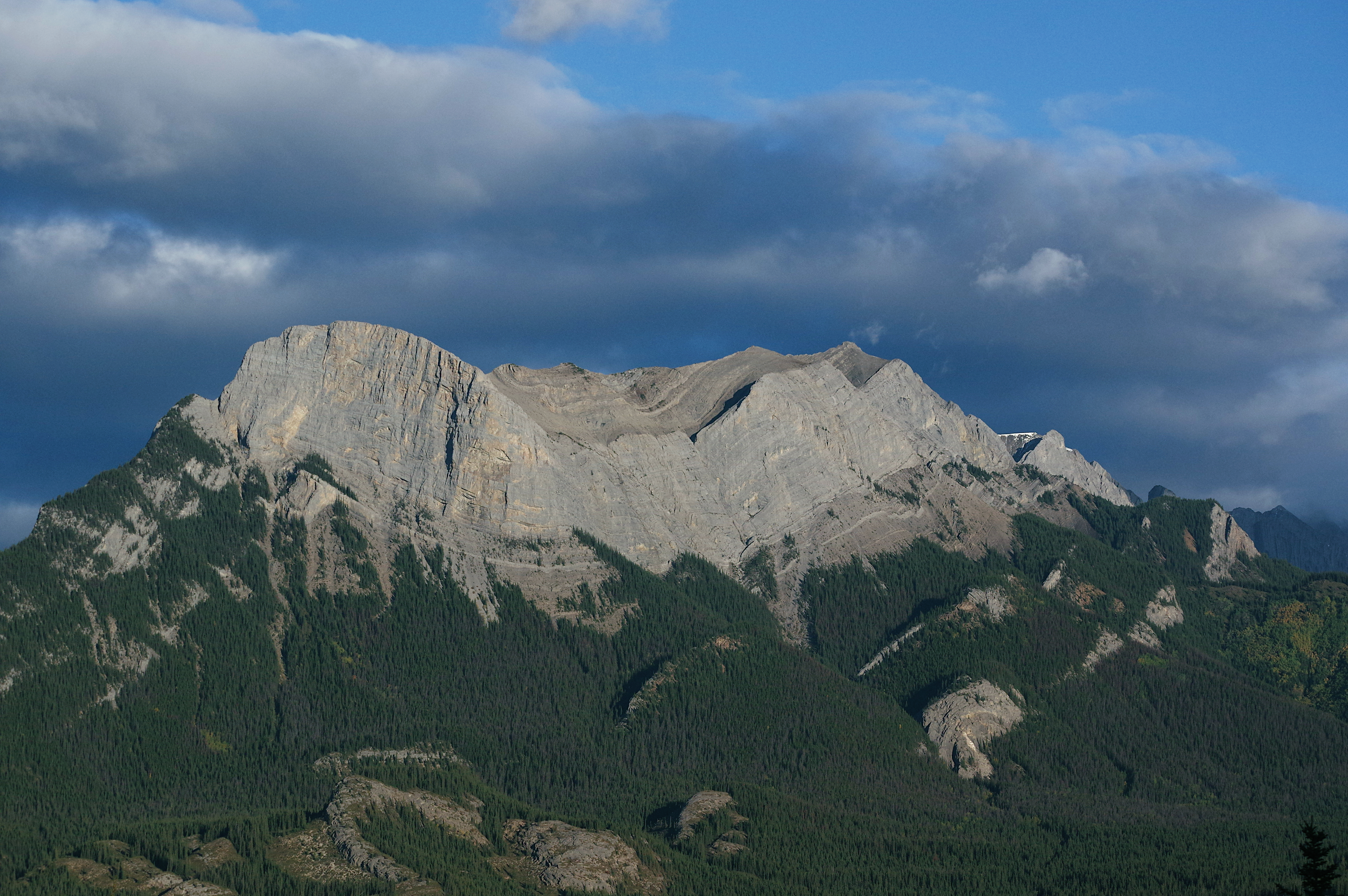

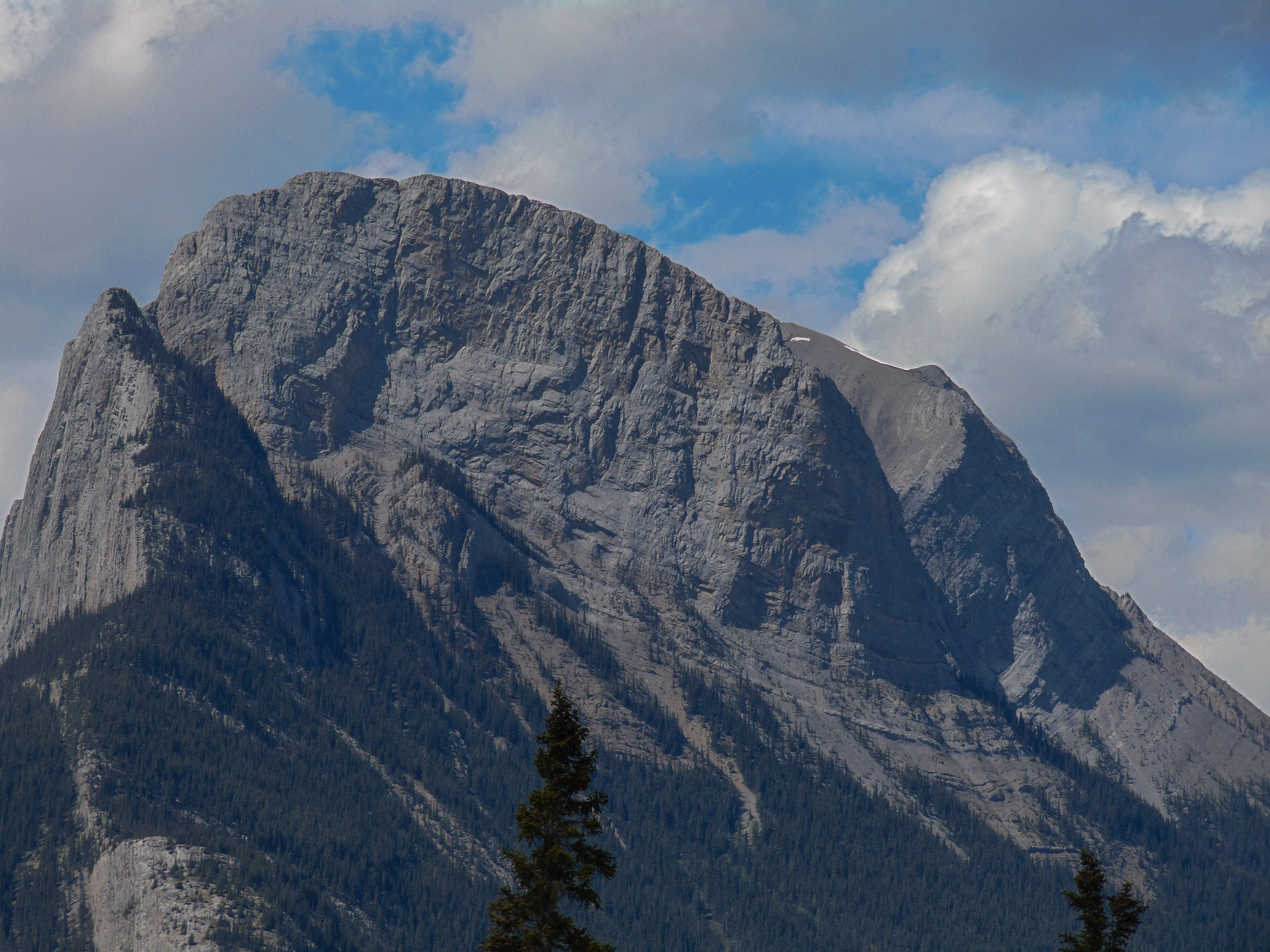
Roche Ronde

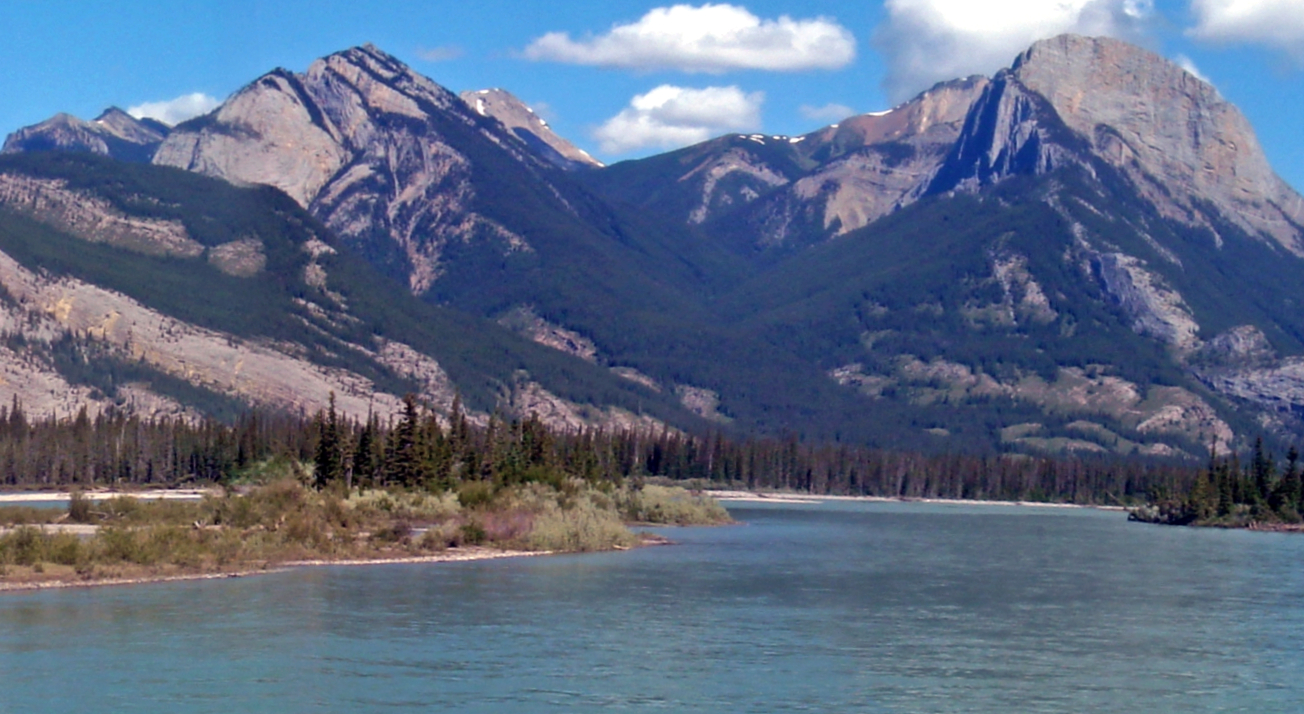
Roche à Bosche (left) and Roche Ronde (right) with Athabasca River

== See also ==
- Geography of Alberta
