= Goat Range =

Goat Range can refer to:

- Goat Range (Alberta)
- Goat Range Provincial Park
