= Mount Aeolus =

Mount Aeolus may refer to:

- Mount Aeolus (Alberta)
- Mount Aeolus (Antarctica)
- Mount Aeolus (Vermont)
