= Coronach Mountain =

Mountain summit in Alberta, Canada

- Location within Alberta Location within Canada

Highest point
- Elevation: 2,462 m (8,077 ft)
- Prominence: 313 m (1,027 ft)
- Listing: Mountains of Alberta
- Coordinates: 53°14′18″N 118°03′59″W

Geography
- Location: Jasper National Park; Alberta, Canada
- Parent range: Bosche Range; Canadian Rockies
- Topo map: NTS 83E1 Snaring River

Coronach Mountain is a 2,462-metre (8,077 ft) mountain summit located in Jasper National Park of Alberta, Canada. It is situated in the Bosche Range of the Canadian Rockies. The mountain was named in 1916 by Morrison P. Bridgland, who was inspired by the howling of nearby coyotes and applied the name Coronach, the Scottish Gaelic word for funeral dirge. Bridgland (1878–1948) was a Dominion Land Surveyor who named many peaks in Jasper Park and the Canadian Rockies. The mountain's name was officially adopted in 1956 by the Geographical Names Board of Canada. Its nearest higher peak is Mount Aeolus, 3.5 km (2.2 mi) to the north.

== Climate ==
Based on the Köppen climate classification, Coronach Mountain is located in a subarctic climate with cold, snowy winters, and mild summers. Temperatures can drop below −20 °C (−4 °F) with wind chill factors below −30 °C (−22 °F). Precipitation runoff from Coronach Mountain drains into tributaries of the Snake Indian River, which in turn is a tributary of the Athabasca River.

== See also ==
- Geology of the Rocky Mountains
