= Mount Nestor =

Mount Nestor may refer to:

- Mount Nestor (Antarctica), a mountain in the Achaean Range of Antarctica
- Mount Nestor (Alberta), a mountain in Alberta, Canada
