= Roche Jacques =

Mountain in Alberta, Canada

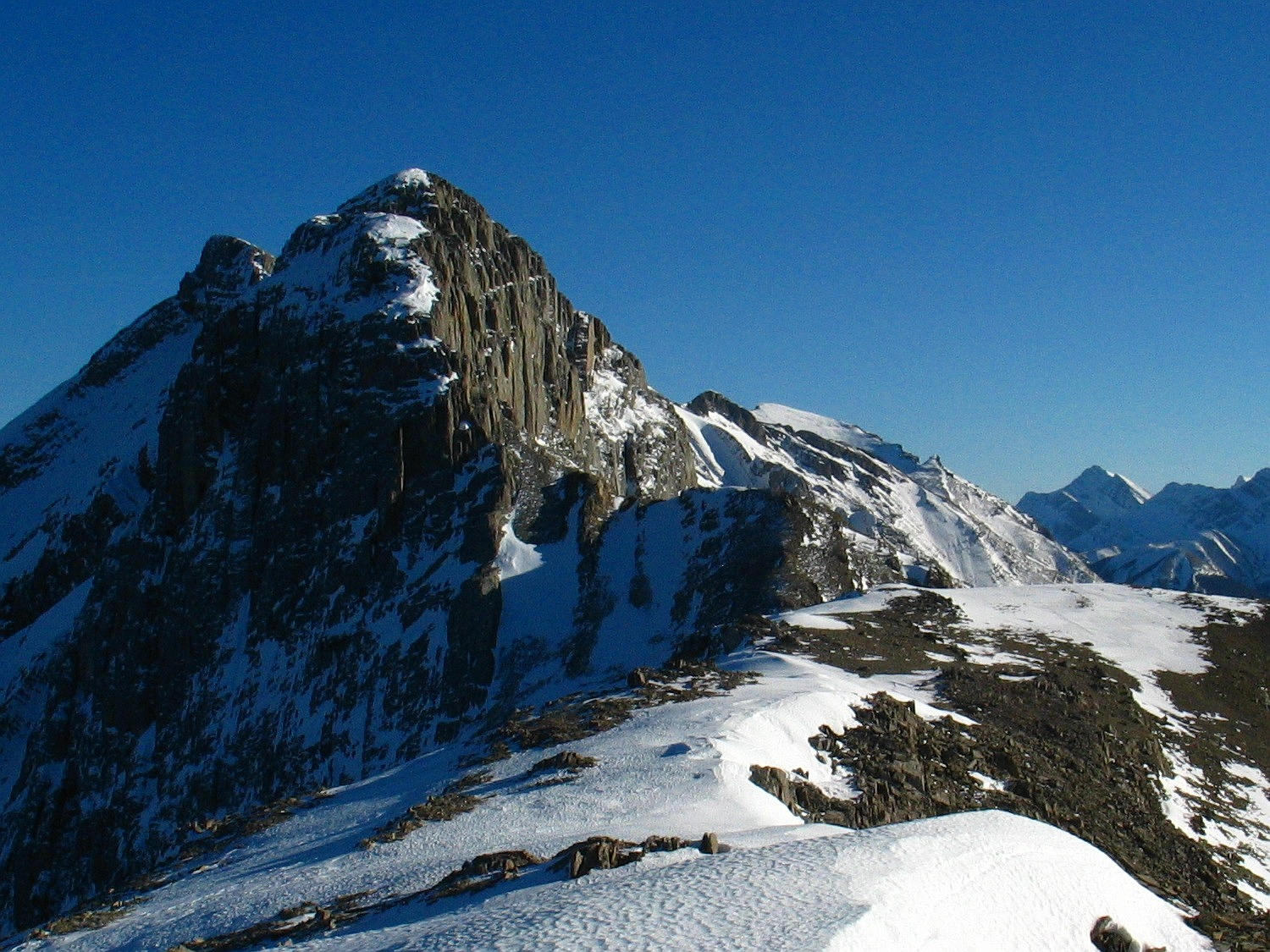
- Roche Jacques from the summit of Cinquefoil Mountain

Highest point
- Elevation: 2,603 m (8,540 ft)
- Prominence: 423 m (1,388 ft)
- Parent peak: Emir Mountain
- Listing: Mountains of Alberta
- Coordinates: 53°02′27″N 117°57′39″W

Geography
- Location within Alberta
- Country: Canada
- Province: Alberta
- Parent range: Jacques Range
- Topo map: NTS 83F4 Miette

Climbing
- Easiest route: rock climb

Roche Jacques is a mountain in the Alberta's Rockies of Canada.

The mountain is located south of Highway 16 and Talbot Lake in Jasper National Park. It is part of the Jacques Range, and is situated immediately southeast of Cinquefoil Mountain, between the Jacques Creek and Cinquefoil Creek valleys.

The mountain was named after Jacques Cardinal, a North West Company employee.
