= Mount Nestor (Alberta) =

Mountain in Alberta, Canada

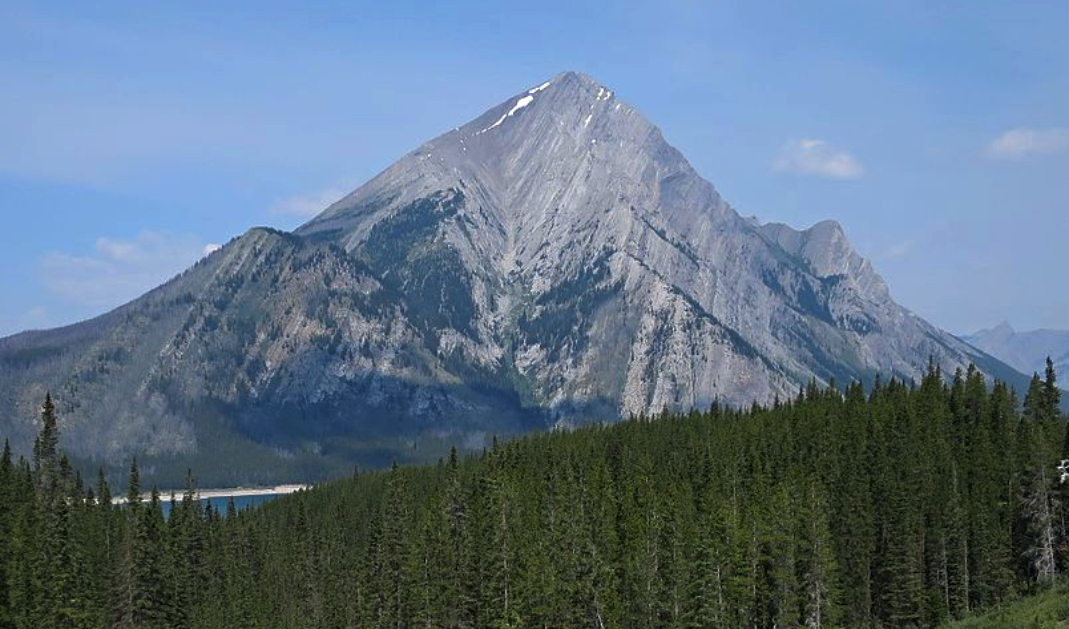
- Mount Nestor seen from the south

Highest point
- Elevation: 2,970 m (9,740 ft)
- Prominence: 288 m (945 ft)
- Parent peak: Old Goat Mountain (3,120 m)
- Listing: Mountains of Alberta
- Coordinates: 50°55′41″N 115°21′53″W

Geography
- Location within Alberta Location within Canada
- Interactive map of Mount Nestor
- Location: Alberta, Canada
- Parent range: Canadian Rockies
- Topo map: NTS 82J14 Spray Lakes Reservoir

Geology
- Rock age: Cambrian
- Rock type: sedimentary rock

Climbing
- First ascent: 1913 by Interprovincial Boundary Commission
- Easiest route: Scrambling South Ridge

Mount Nestor is a 2,970-metre (9,740 ft) mountain summit located in Kananaskis Country in the Canadian Rockies of Alberta, Canada. It is named after HMS Nestor, a destroyer sunk in the Battle of Jutland during World War I. Mount Nestor is situated at the south end of the Goat Range along the west shore of Spray Lakes Reservoir. Nestor's east flank is within Spray Valley Provincial Park, while the west aspect is within Banff National Park, with the boundary line between the two parks running roughly north-to-south over its summit. The nearest higher peak is Old Goat Mountain, 2.0 km (1.2 mi) to the north. Mount Nestor can be seen from Alberta Highway 742, the Smith-Dorrien/Spray Trail.

== History ==
The first ascent of the mountain was made in 1913 by the Interprovincial Boundary Commission. The mountain's name was officially adopted in 1922 by the Geographical Names Board of Canada.

== Geology ==
Mount Nestor is composed of sedimentary rock laid down during the Precambrian to Jurassic periods. Formed in shallow seas, this sedimentary rock was pushed east and over the top of younger rock during the Laramide orogeny.

== Climate ==
Based on the Köppen climate classification, Mount Nestor is located in a subarctic climate with cold, snowy winters, and mild summers. Temperatures can drop below −20 °C (−4 °F) with wind chill factors below −30 °C (−22 °F). Precipitation runoff from the mountain drains into the Spray Lakes Reservoir.

== Gallery ==
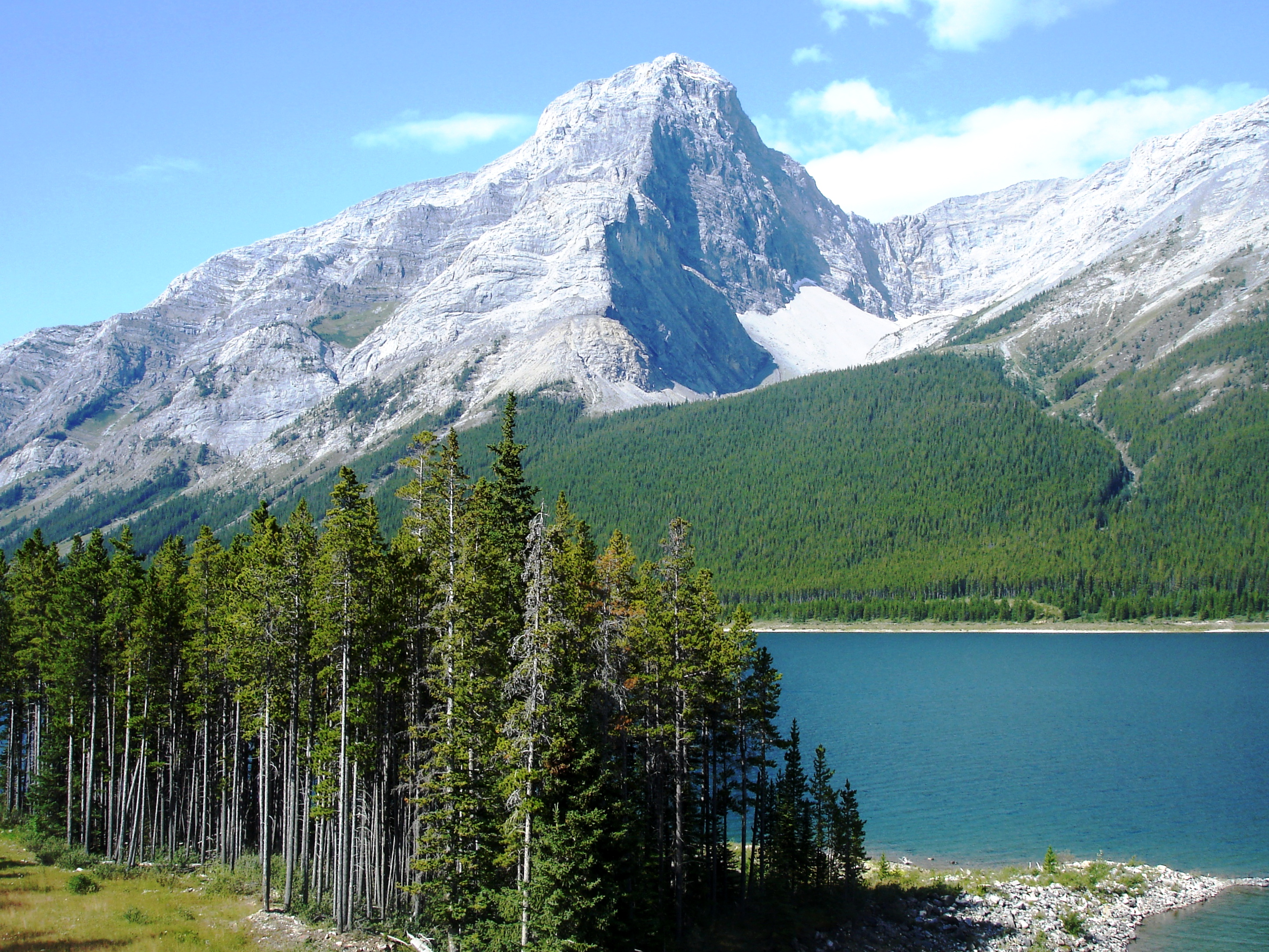
Mount Nestor and Spray Lakes

== See Also ==
- List of mountains of Canada
- Nestor Peak
