= Panther Mountain (Alberta) =

Mountain in Banff NP, Alberta, Canada

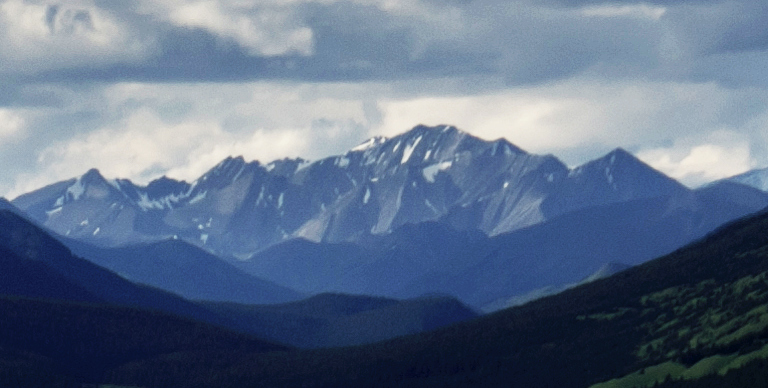
- Panther Mountain, photographed from the top of Sulphur Mountain.

Highest point
- Elevation: 2,943 m (9,656 ft)
- Prominence: 483 m (1,585 ft)
- Listing: List of mountains of Alberta
- Coordinates: 51°30′42″N 115°40′06″W

Geography
- Location within Alberta
- Location: Alberta, Canada
- Parent range: Bare Range
- Topo map: NTS 82O12 Barrier Mountain

Climbing
- First ascent: 1891 by J.J. McArthur and Tom Wilson

Panther Mountain is a mountain in Banff National Park, Alberta, Canada.

The mountain was named in 1884 by George M. Dawson after learning that the local Indians referred to a river below the peak as "The river where the mountain lion was killed".
