= Mount Greenock =

Mountain in Jasper NP, Alberta, Canada

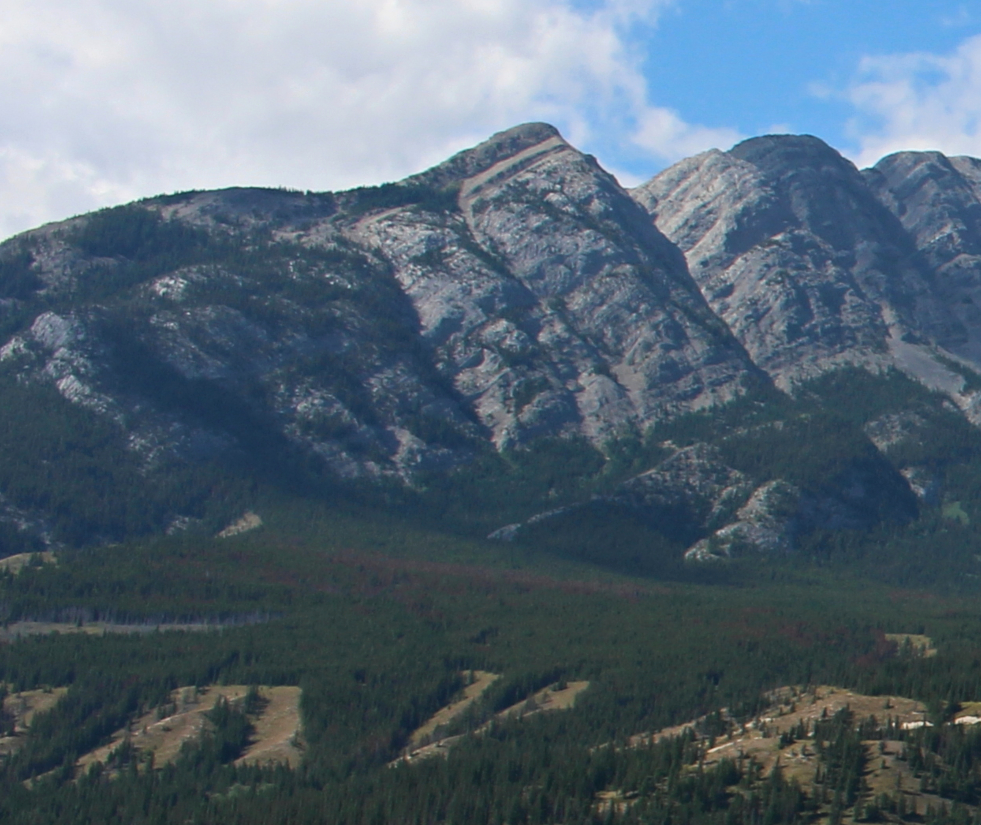
- Mount Greenock seen from Highway 16

Highest point
- Elevation: 2,073 m (6,801 ft)
- Listing: Mountains of Alberta
- Coordinates: 53°06′18″N 118°05′17″W

Geography
- Location within Alberta Location within Canada
- Location: Jasper National Park; Alberta, Canada
- Parent range: De Smet Range; Canadian Rockies
- Topo map: NTS 83E1 Snaring River

Mount Greenock is a 2,073-metre (6,801 ft) mountain summit located in the Athabasca River valley of Jasper National Park in Alberta, Canada. It is situated in the De Smet Range of the Canadian Rockies. It was named in 1916 by Morrison P. Bridgland after Greenock, in Scotland. Bridgland (1878–1948) was a Dominion Land Surveyor who named many peaks in Jasper Park and the Canadian Rockies. The mountain's name was officially adopted in 1956 by the Geographical Names Board of Canada.

== Climate ==
Based on the Köppen climate classification, Mount Greenock is located in a subarctic climate with cold, snowy winters, and mild summers. Temperatures can drop below -20 °C with wind chill factors below -30 °C. Precipitation runoff from Mount Greenock drains into tributaries of the Athabasca River.

== See also ==
- Geology of the Rocky Mountains
