= Mount Bistre (Alberta) =

Mountain in Alberta, Canada

- Location within Alberta Location within Canada

Highest point
- Elevation: 2,346 m (7,697 ft)
- Prominence: 288 m (945 ft)
- Parent peak: Mount Haultain (2713 m)
- Isolation: 3.54 km (2.20 mi)
- Listing: Mountains of Alberta
- Coordinates: 53°12′24″N 118°13′40″W

Geography
- Country: Canada
- Province: Alberta
- Protected area: Jasper National Park
- Parent range: De Smet Range; Canadian Rockies
- Topo map: NTS 83E1 Snaring River

Mount Bistre is a summit in Alberta, Canada. It was named by M. P. Bridgland for its bistre colour.
