= Goat Range (Alberta) =

Mountain range in Alberta, Canada

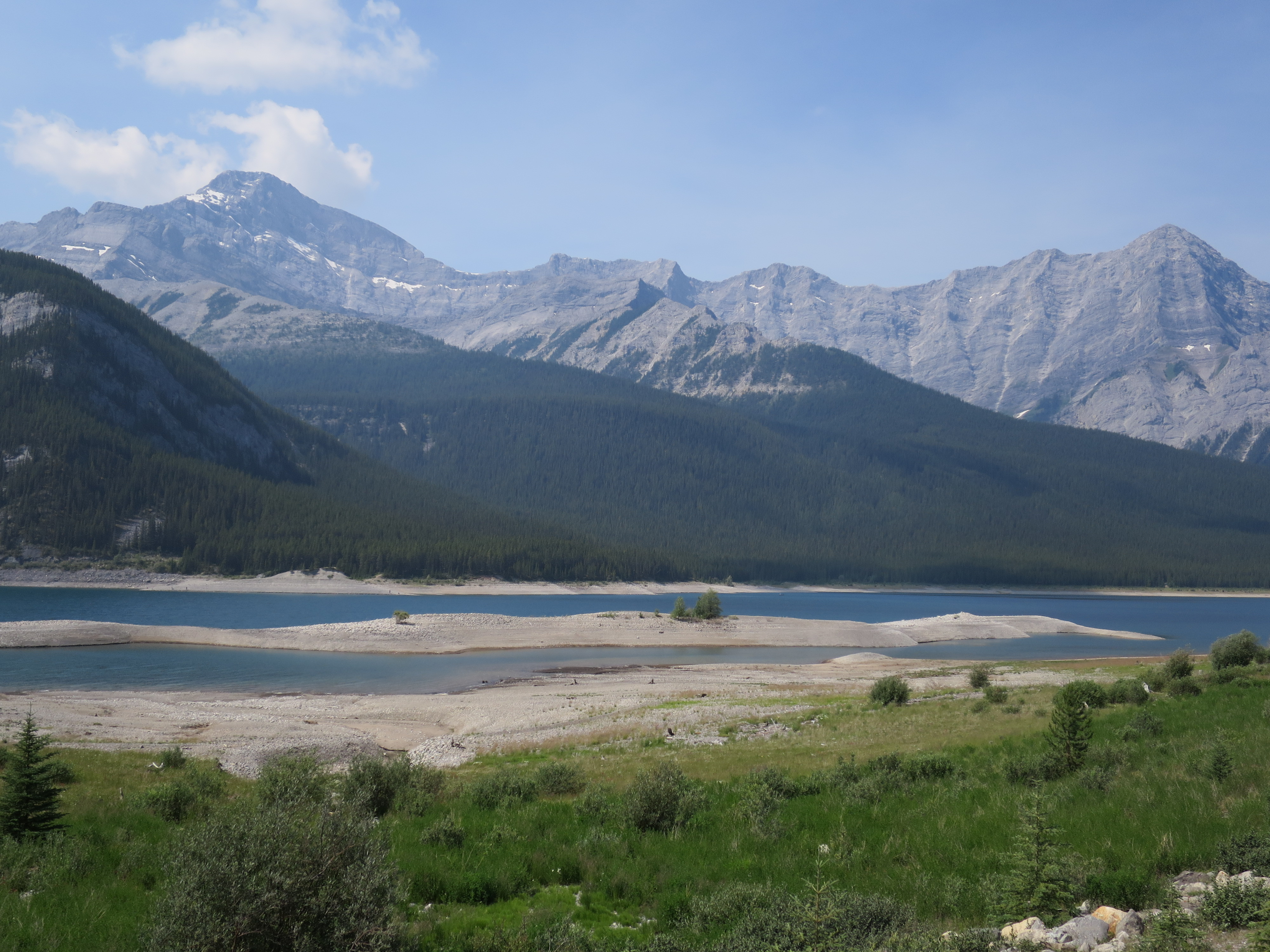
- Old Goat Mountain from the Smith-Dorrien Trail across the Spray Lakes Reservoir

Highest point
- Peak: Old Goat Mountain
- Elevation: 3,109 m (10,200 ft)
- Coordinates: 50°56′41″N 115°22′22″W

Dimensions
- Area: 115 km^{2} (44 mi^{2})

Geography
- Location within Alberta
- Country: Canada
- Province: Alberta
- Range coordinates: 51°00′01″N 115°25′26″W
- Parent range: Canadian Rockies
- Topo map: NTS 82J/14

The Goat Range is a mountain range of the Canadian Rockies in southwestern Alberta, Canada.

It is a part of the Front Ranges of the Southern Continental Ranges and lies on the western edge of Kananaskis Country, on the boundary between Spray Valley Provincial Park and Banff National Park. To the east, the Spray Lakes Reservoir separates the Goat Range from the Kananaskis Range, to the north-east, Goat Creek separates it from Mount Rundle, and to the south-west, the Spray River separates it from Sundance Range. It covers an area of about 115 km², extending about 25 km in a NNW-SSE direction with a width ranging between 4 and 6 km.

The highest peak is Old Goat Mountain (3109 m), located near the southern end of the range. A small glacier, the Old Goat Glacier, lies in a narrow cirque below the steep north-east face of the summit at an altitude of only 2300-2500 m. From the Spray Lakes West Campground, an unmaintained trail leads up for 4 km, ascending 200 m towards the glacier. The Gem Trek map suggests that from the end of the trail, the cirque can be reached without a path. No other hiking trails exist in the range. The only other named peak, Mount Nestor (2975m), forms the southern end of the range.

== Gallery ==
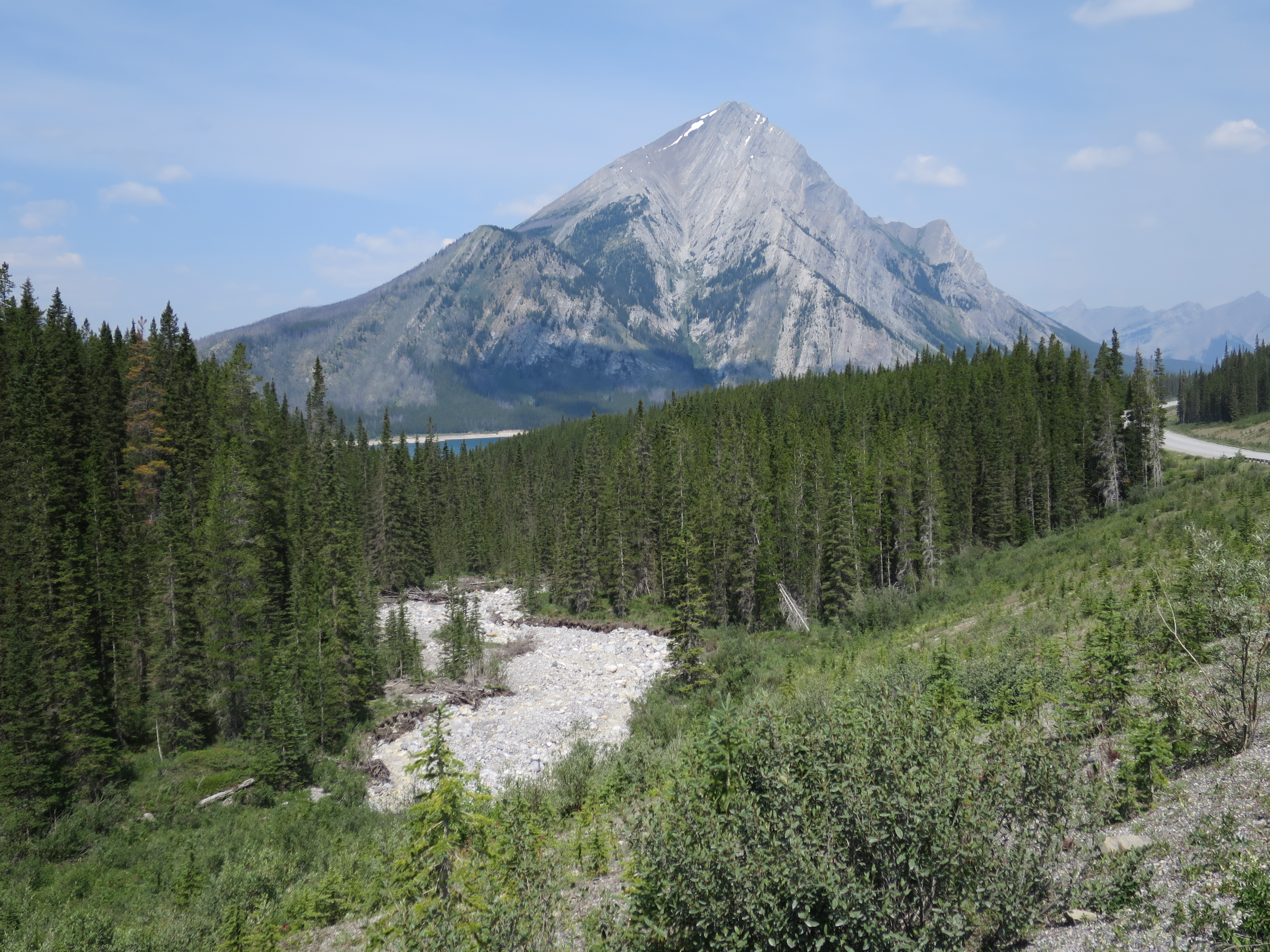
Mount Nestor from Buller Creek, Smith-Dorrien Trail

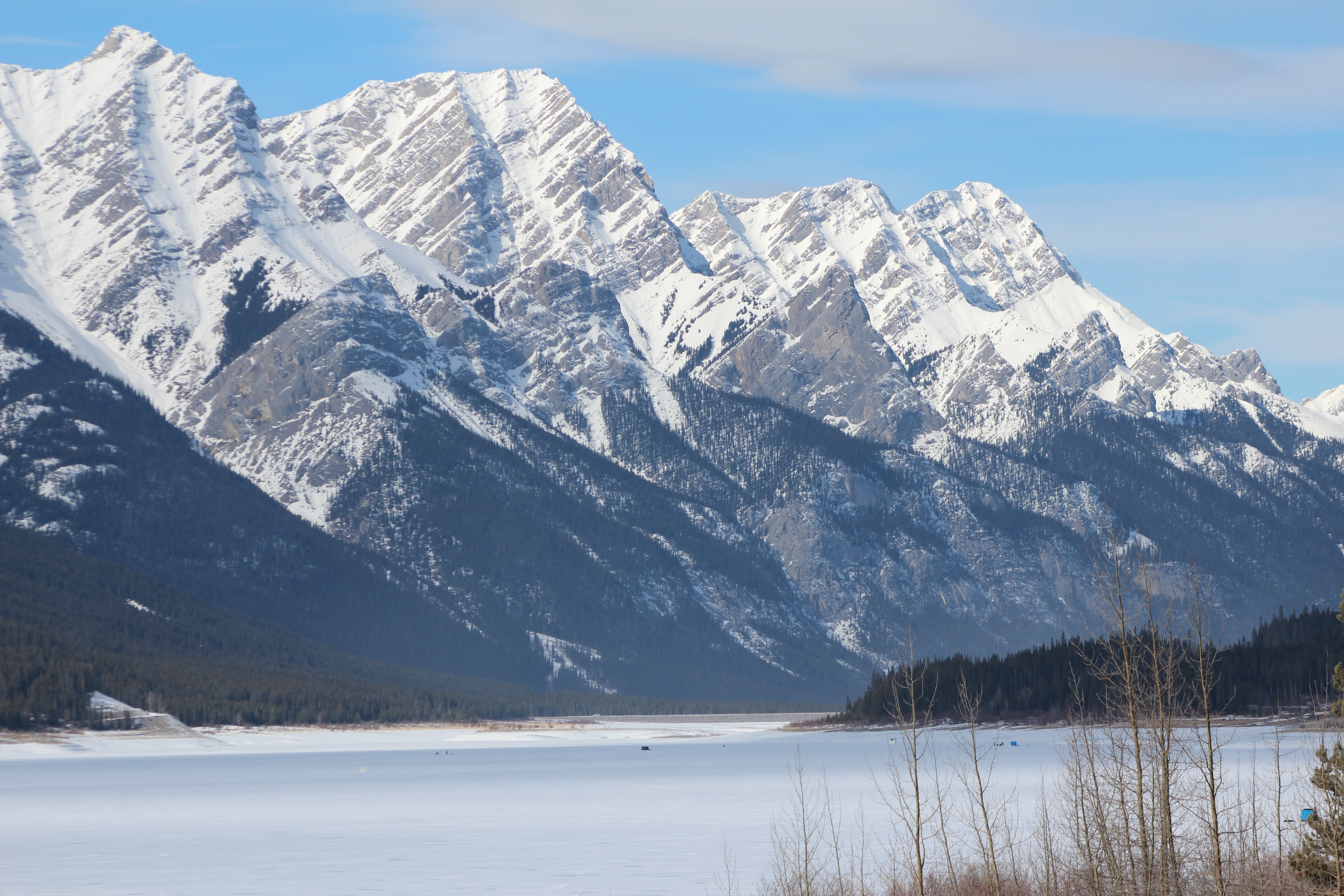
Northern section of the Goat Range seen from Spray Lake near Spurling Creek
