= Jacques Range =

Mountain range in Alberta, Canada

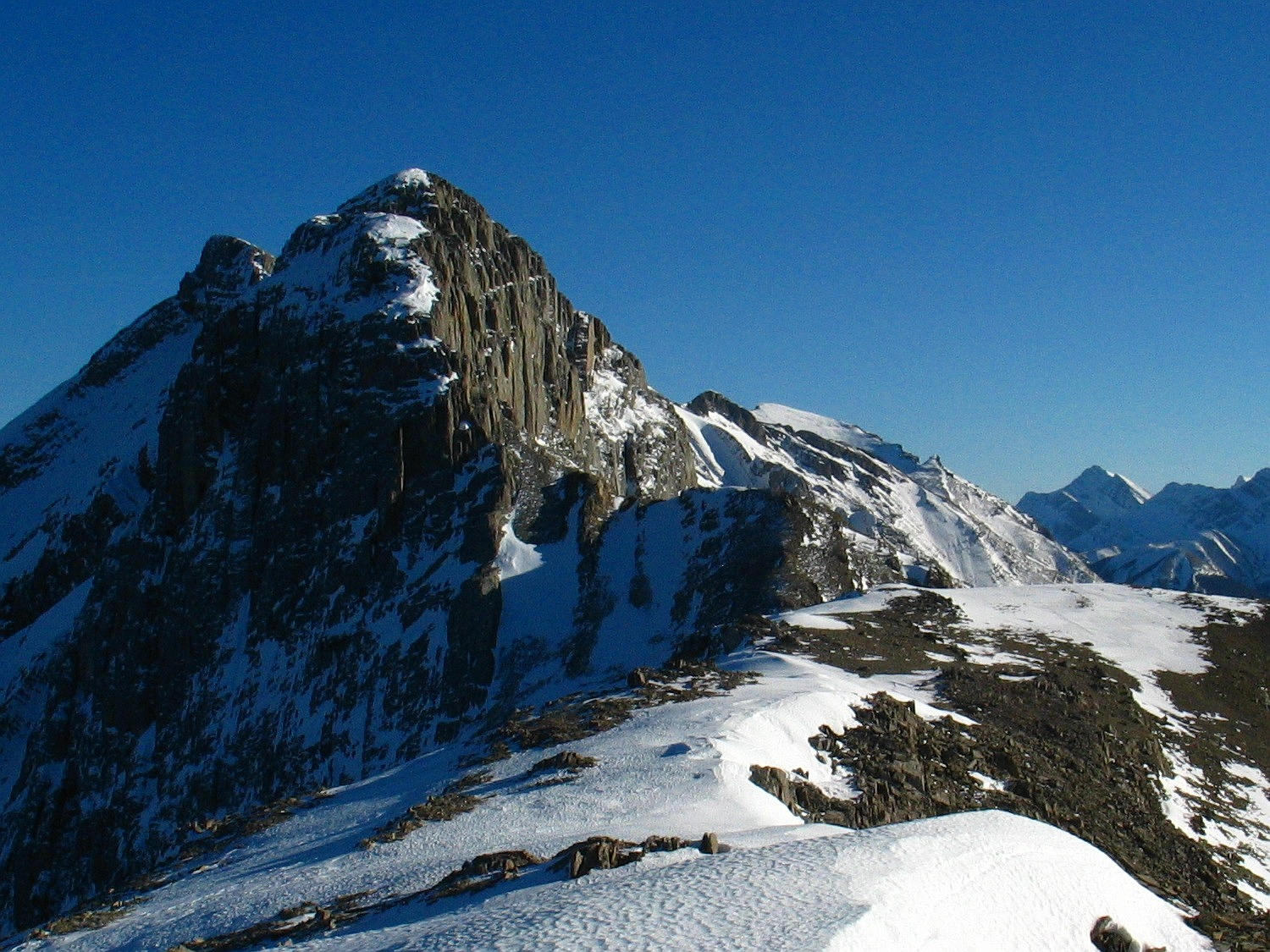
- Roche Jacques from the summit of Cinquefoil Mountain

Highest point
- Peak: Mount Merlin
- Elevation: 2,711 m (8,894 ft)
- Listing: Mountains of Alberta
- Coordinates: 52°59′07″N 117°50′07″W

Dimensions
- Area: 121 km^{2} (47 mi^{2})

Geography
- Location within Alberta
- Country: Canada
- Province: Alberta
- Protected area: Jasper National Park
- Range coordinates: 53°01′N 117°55′W
- Parent range: Front Ranges
- Topo map: NTS 83F4 Miette

The Jacques Range is a mountain range in the Front Ranges of the Canadian Rockies, located south of Highway 16 and Jasper Lake in Jasper National Park, Alberta, Canada.

This range includes the following mountains and peaks:

Name	Elevation (m/ft)	
Mount Merlin	2,711	8,894
Emir Mountain	2,616	8,583
Roche Jacques	2,603	8,540
Merlin Ridge	2,362	7,749
Cinquefoil Mountain	2,260	7,410

== See also ==
- Ranges of the Canadian Rockies
