= Cumnock, Louisiana =

- Unincorporated community
- Location within Louisiana Location within the United States
- Coordinates: 30°57′07″N 90°10′47″W
- Country: United States
- State: Louisiana
- Parish: Washington
- Elevation: 194 ft (59 m)
- Time zone: UTC-6 (Central (CST))
  - Summer (DST): UTC-5 (CDT)
- Area code: 985
- GNIS feature ID: 543901

Cumnock is an unincorporated community in Washington Parish, Louisiana, United States. The community is located 7 miles (11.27 kilometres) N. of Franklinton, Louisiana.
