= Mount Cumnock =

Mountain in Alberta, Canada

- Location within Alberta Location within Canada

Highest point
- Elevation: 2,438 m (7,999 ft)
- Prominence: 624 m (2,047 ft)
- Listing: Mountains of Alberta
- Coordinates: 53°10′24″N 118°11′02″W

Geography
- Location: Jasper National Park; Alberta, Canada
- Parent range: De Smet Range; Canadian Rockies
- Topo map: NTS 83E1 Snaring River

Mount Cumnock is a 2,438 m (7,999 ft) mountain summit located in Jasper National Park of Alberta, Canada. It is situated in the De Smet Range of the Canadian Rockies. Mount Cumnock was named in 1916 by Morrison P. Bridgland after Cumnock, in Scotland. Bridgland (1878-1948) was a Dominion Land Surveyor who named many peaks in Jasper Park and the Canadian Rockies. The mountain's name was officially adopted in 1956 by the Geographical Names Board of Canada. Its nearest higher peak is Mount Haultain, 7.5 km (4.7 mi) to the west.

== Climate ==
Based on the Köppen climate classification, Mount Cumnock is located in a subarctic climate with cold, snowy winters, and mild summers. Temperatures can drop below -20 °C with wind chill factors below -30 °C. Precipitation runoff from Mount Cumnock drains into Snake Indian River which is a tributary of the Athabasca River.

== See also ==
- Geography of Alberta
- Geology of the Rocky Mountains
