= Old Goat Mountain =

Mountain in the Canadian Rockies

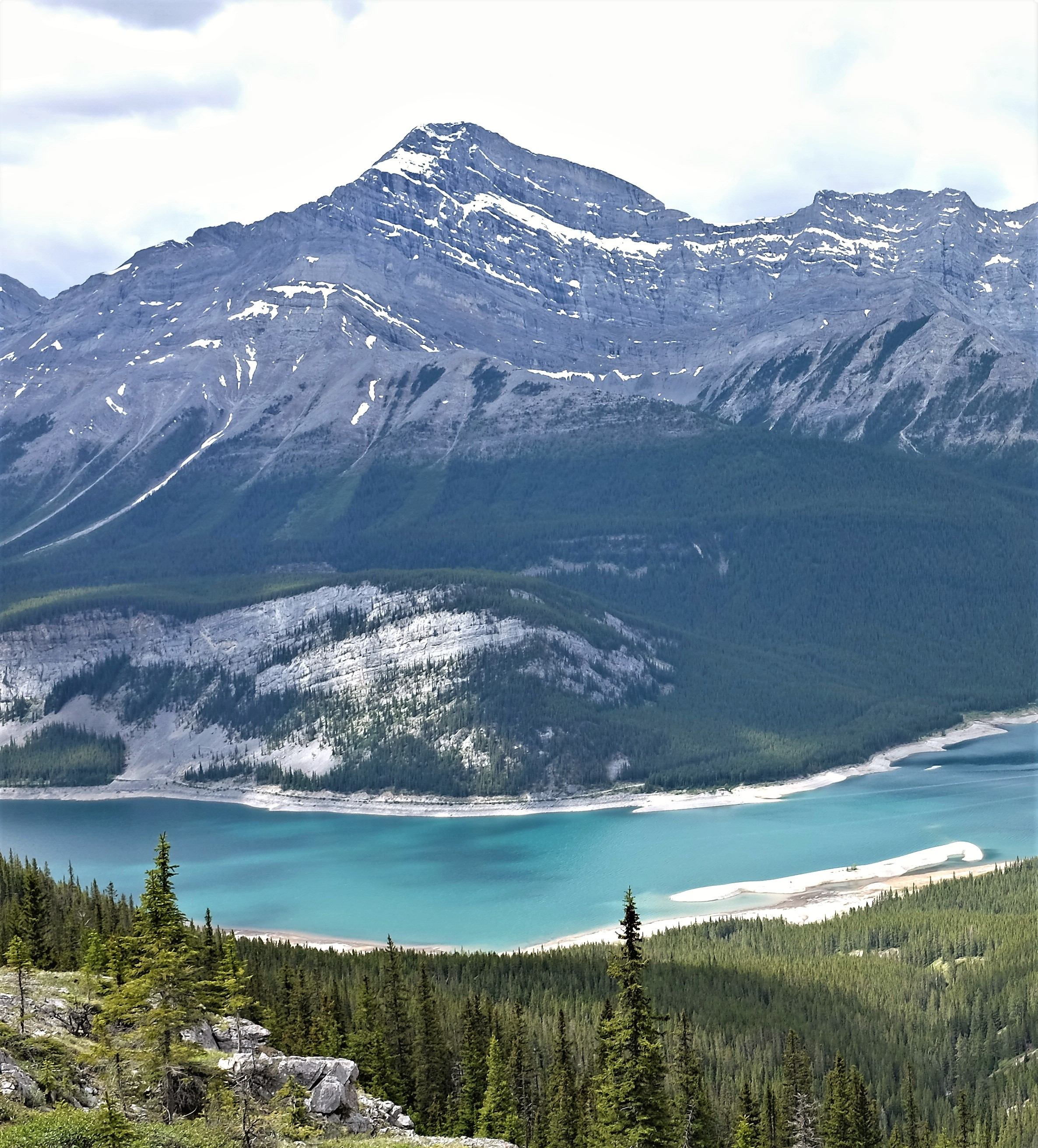
- Northeast aspect

Highest point
- Elevation: 3,120 m (10,240 ft)
- Prominence: 1,444 m (4,738 ft)
- Parent peak: Wind Mountain (3,153 m)
- Listing: Mountains of Alberta
- Coordinates: 50°56′40″N 115°22′21″W

Geography
- Location within Alberta Location within Canada
- Interactive map of Old Goat Mountain
- Location: Alberta, Canada
- Parent range: Goat Range; Canadian Rockies
- Topo map: NTS 82J14 Spray Lakes Reservoir

Geology
- Rock age: Cambrian
- Rock type: Sedimentary

Climbing
- Easiest route: Scramble

Old Goat Mountain is a 3,120-metre (10,240 ft) mountain summit located in Kananaskis Country of Alberta, Canada.

== Description ==
Old Goat Mountain is situated near the south end of the Goat Range which is a subrange of the Canadian Rockies, and is the highest point in the Goat Range. The east flank of the mountain is within Spray Valley Provincial Park, whereas the west aspect is within Banff National Park, with the boundary line between the two parks running roughly north-to-south over its summit. Precipitation runoff from the mountain drains to the Spray Lakes Reservoir. Topographic relief is significant as the summit rises over 1,400 meters (4,600 feet) above Spray Lake in three kilometers (1.86 mile). The nearest higher peak is Wind Mountain, 8.9 km (5.5 mi) to the east. Old Goat Mountain can be seen from Alberta Highway 742, the Smith-Dorrien/Spray Trail.

== History ==
The mountain was named "Old Goat" in memory of Rick Collier, a founding member of the Old Goats Climbing Club, who had climbed this peak numerous times and had written much about it. Collier died in a 2012 mountaineering accident, so the mountain's name has not yet been officially adopted.

== Geology ==
Old Goat Mountain is composed of sedimentary rock laid down during the Precambrian to Jurassic periods. Formed in shallow seas, this sedimentary rock was pushed east and over the top of younger rock during the Laramide orogeny.

== Climate ==
Based on the Köppen climate classification, Old Goat Mountain is located in a subarctic climate zone with cold, snowy winters, and mild summers. Winter temperatures can drop below −20 °C (−4 °F) with wind chill factors below −30 °C (−22 °F).

== Gallery ==
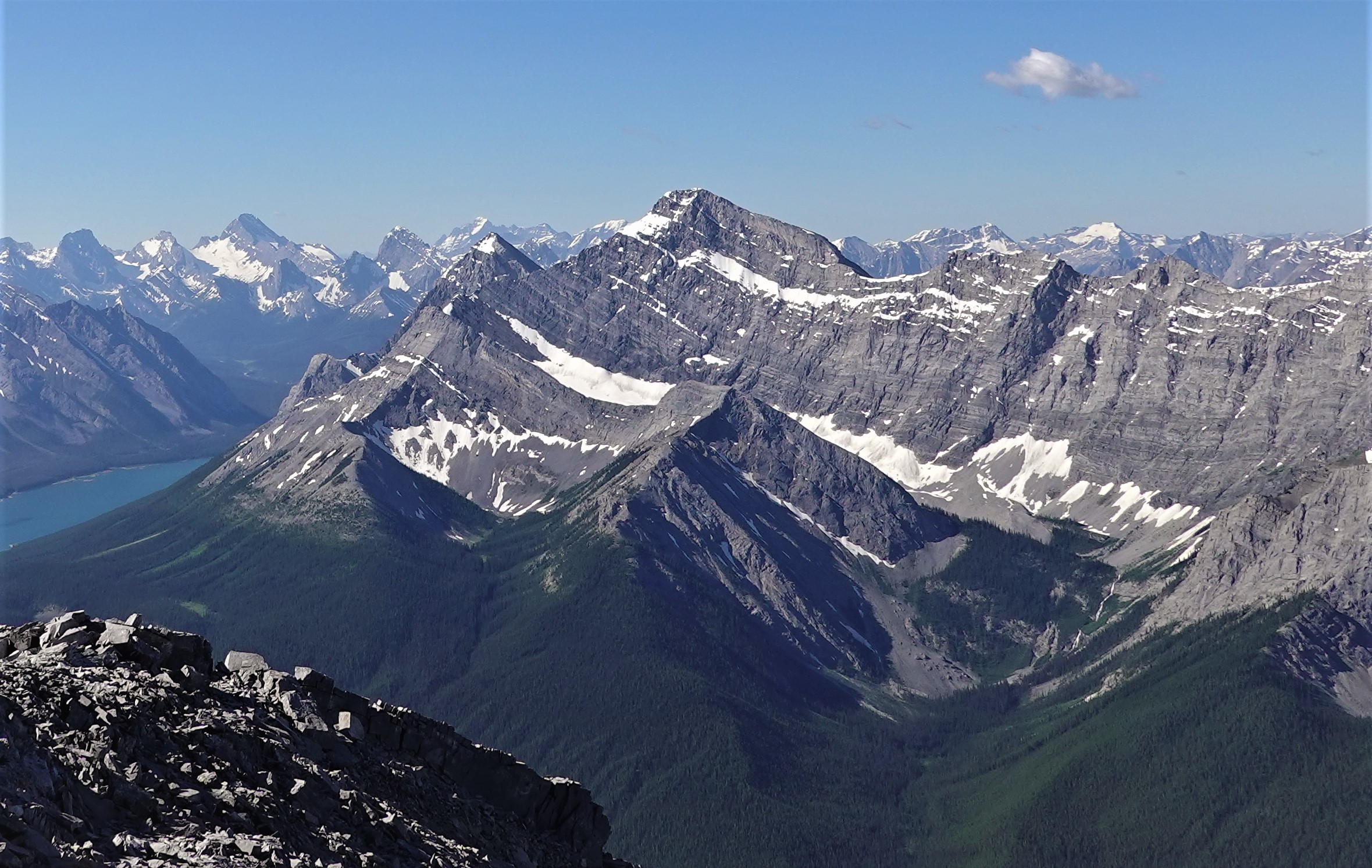
North aspect of Old Goat seen from summit of Three Sisters

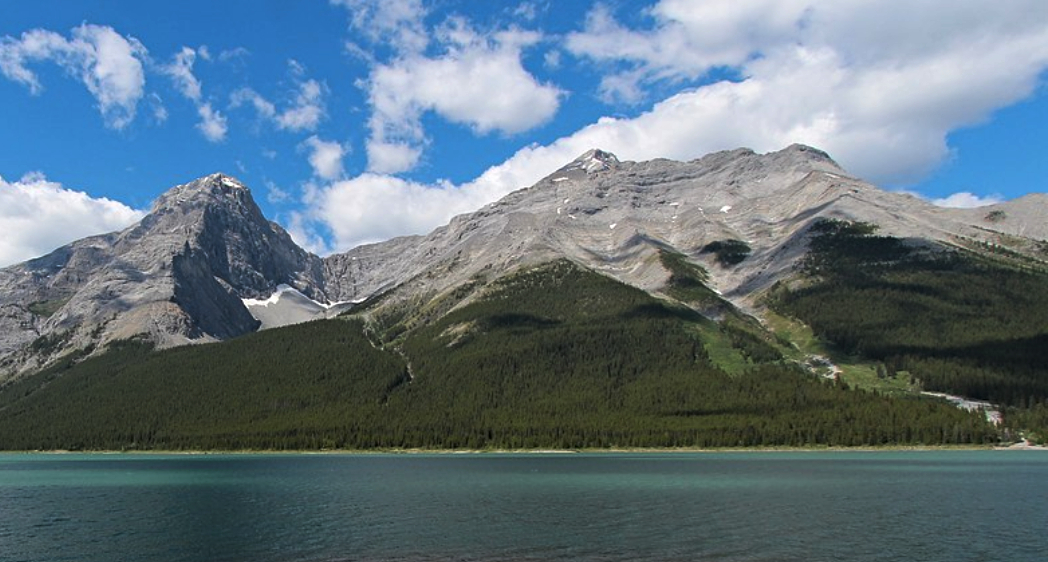
Mount Nestor (left) and Old Goat Mountain (right)

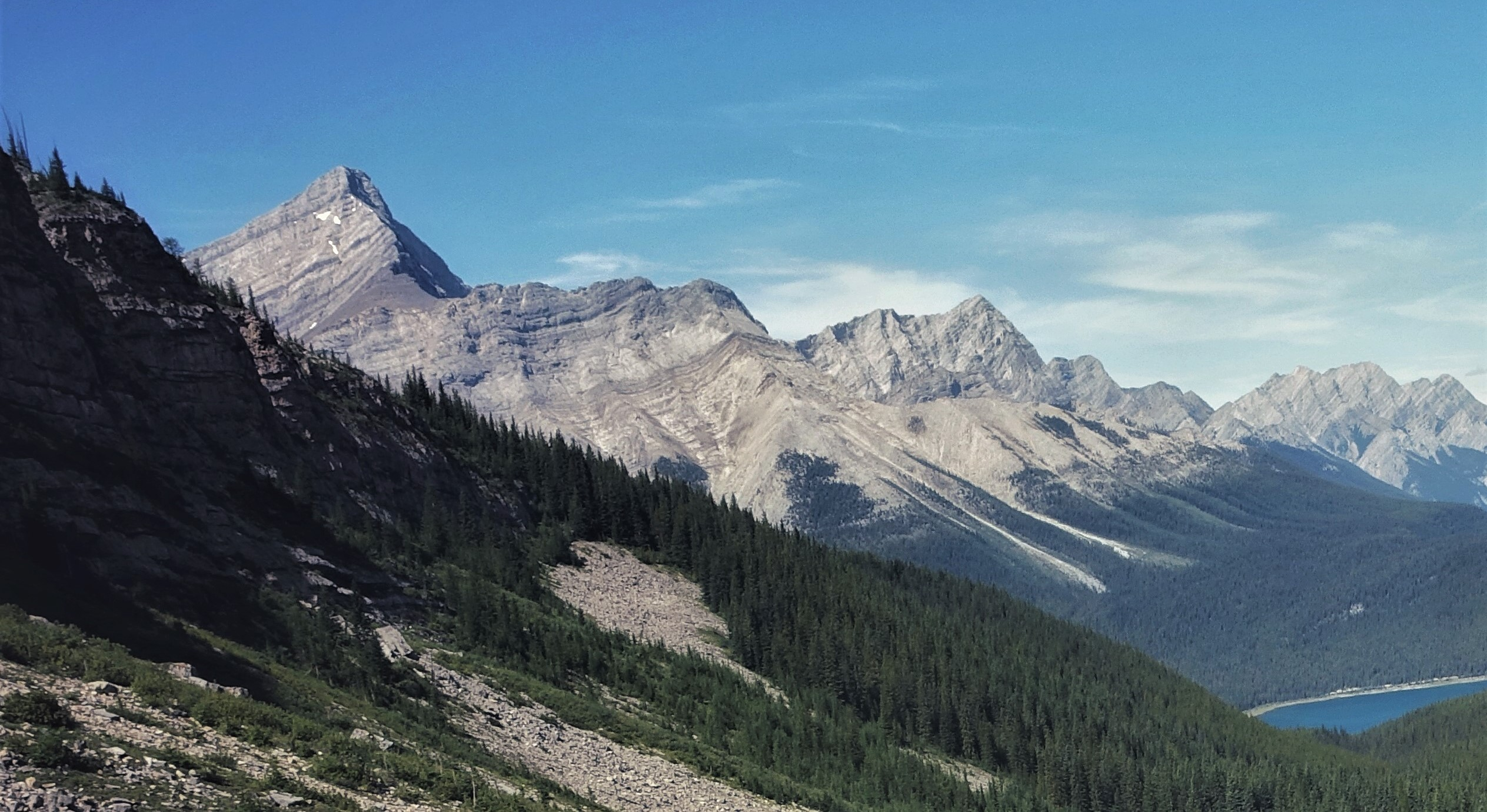
Southeast aspect Old Goat Mountain (left)

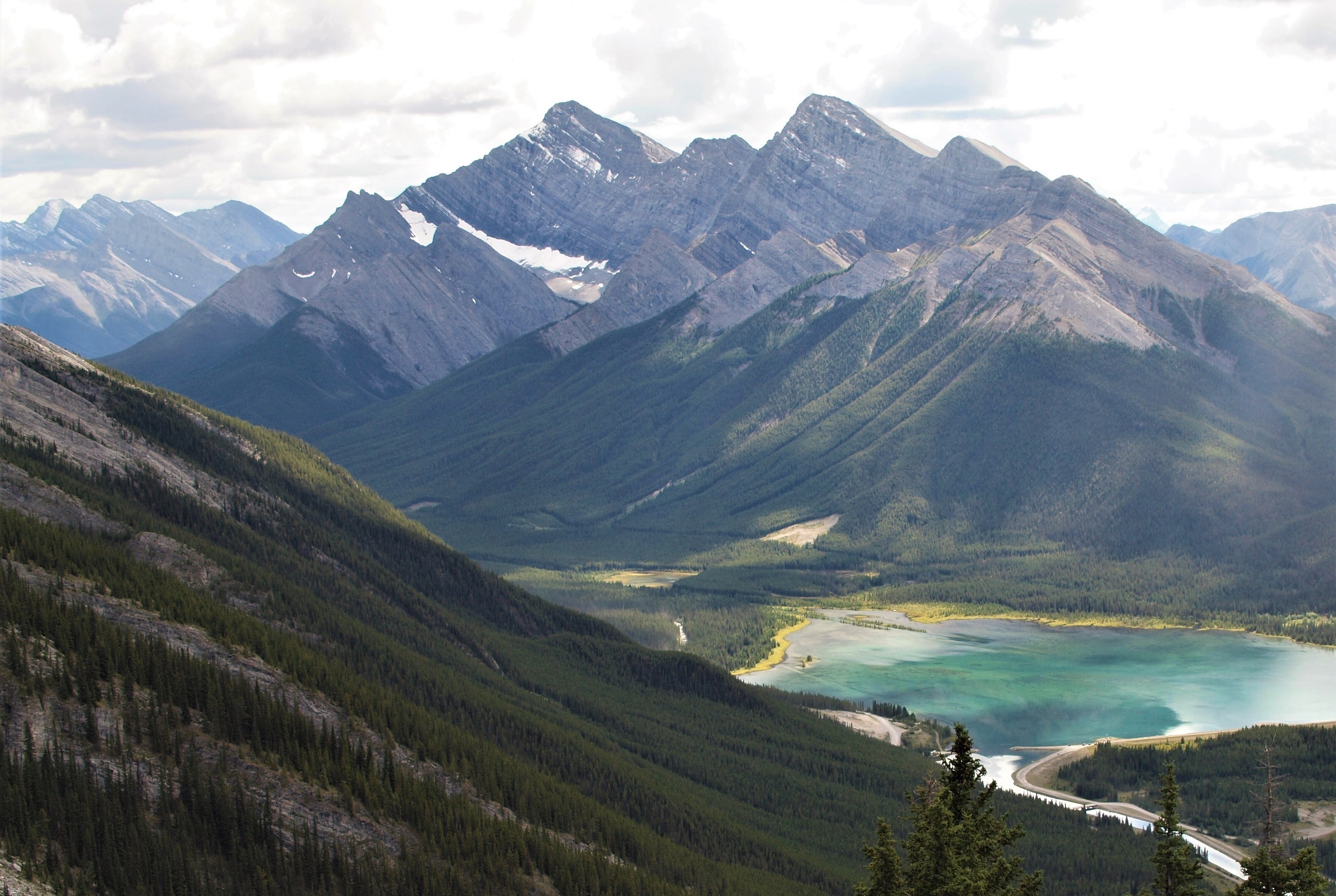
North aspect of Old Goat from slopes of Mt. Lawrence Grassi

== See also ==
- Scrambles in the Canadian Rockies
