= Roche à Bosche =

Mountain in Alberta, Canada

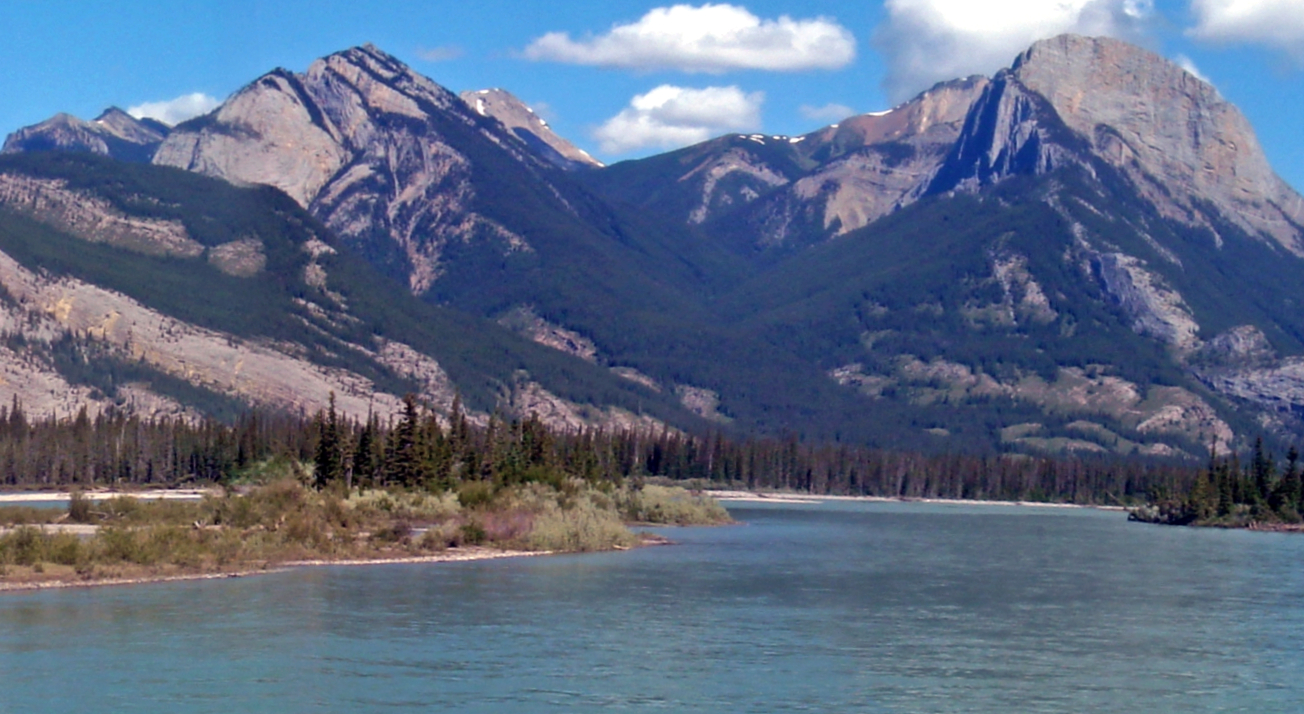
- Roche à Bosche (left) and Roche Ronde (right) with Athabasca River

Highest point
- Elevation: 2,148 m (7,047 ft)
- Prominence: 159 m (522 ft)
- Coordinates: 53°12′54″N 118°02′30″W

Geography
- Location within Alberta Location within Canada
- Location: Alberta, Canada
- Parent range: Bosche Range
- Topo map: NTS 83E1 Snaring River

Roche à Bosche is a 2,148 metre mountain summit located at the south end of the Bosche Range in Jasper National Park, in the Canadian Rockies of Alberta, Canada. The peak may be seen from the Jasper House National Historic Site along Highway 16.

== Climate ==
Based on the Köppen climate classification, Roche à Bosche is located in a subarctic climate with cold, snowy winters, and mild summers. Temperatures can drop below -20 C with wind chill factors below -30 C. Precipitation runoff from Roche à Bosche drains into the Athabasca River.

== See also ==
- Mountains of Alberta
