= Roche de Smet =

Mountain in Jasper National Park, Alberta, Canada

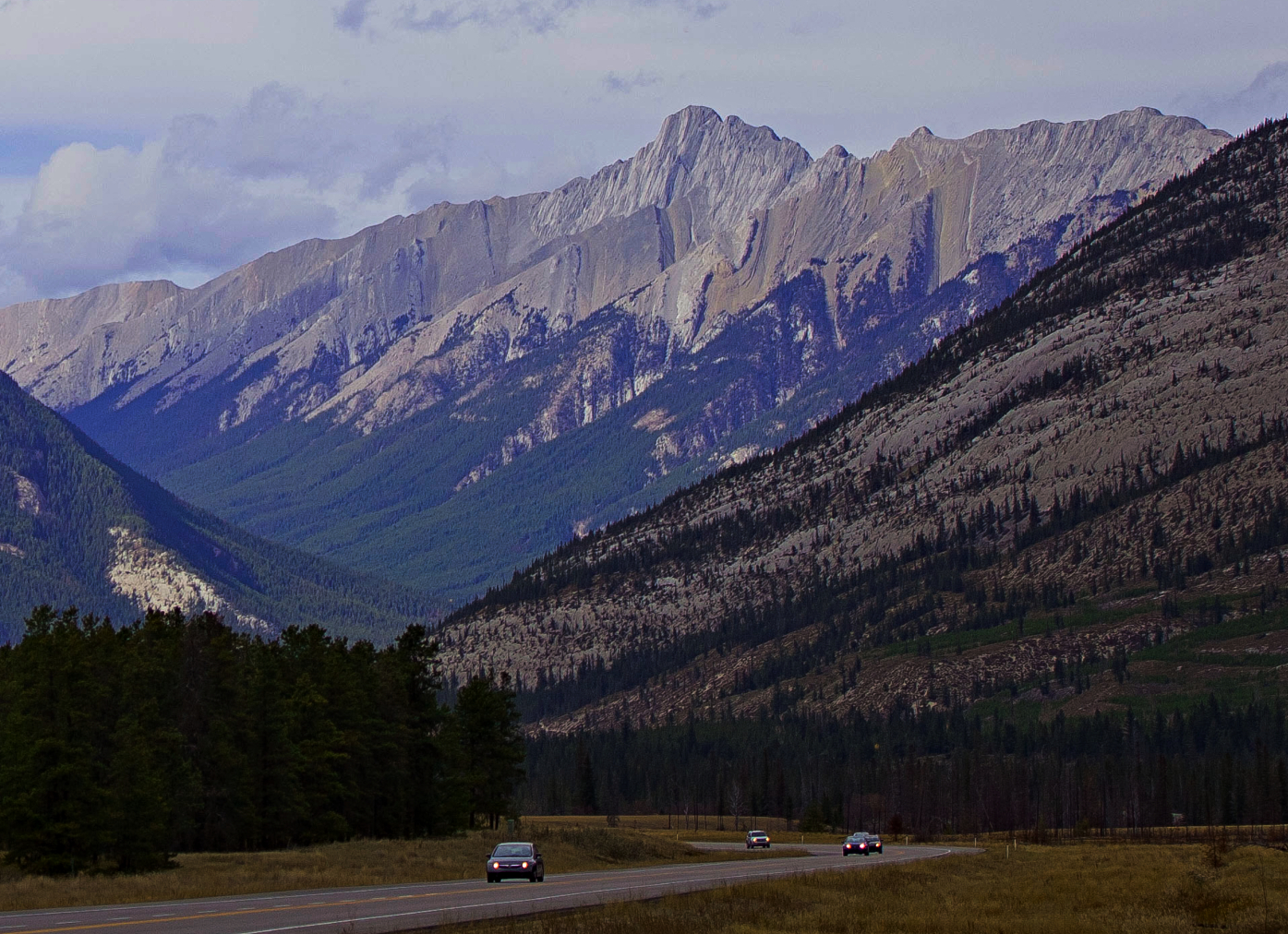
- Roche De Smet seen from Highway 16

Highest point
- Elevation: 2,539 m (8,330 ft)
- Prominence: 847 m (2,779 ft)
- Parent peak: Redan Mountain
- Listing: Mountains of Alberta
- Coordinates: 53°08′03″N 118°06′59″W

Geography
- Location within Alberta Location within Canada
- Interactive map of Roche de Smet
- Country: Canada
- Province: Alberta
- Parent range: De Smet Range; Canadian Rockies
- Topo map: NTS 83E1 Snaring River

Roche de Smet is a 2,539 m (8,330 ft) mountain summit located in the Athabasca River valley of Jasper National Park in Alberta, Canada. It is situated in the De Smet Range of the Canadian Rockies. It was named in 1896 after Pierre-Jean De Smet.

== Climate ==
Based on the Köppen climate classification, Roche de Smet is located in a subarctic climate with cold, snowy winters, and mild summers. Temperatures can drop below -20 °C with wind chill factors below -30 °C. Precipitation runoff from Roche de Smet drains into tributaries of the Athabasca River.

== Gallery ==
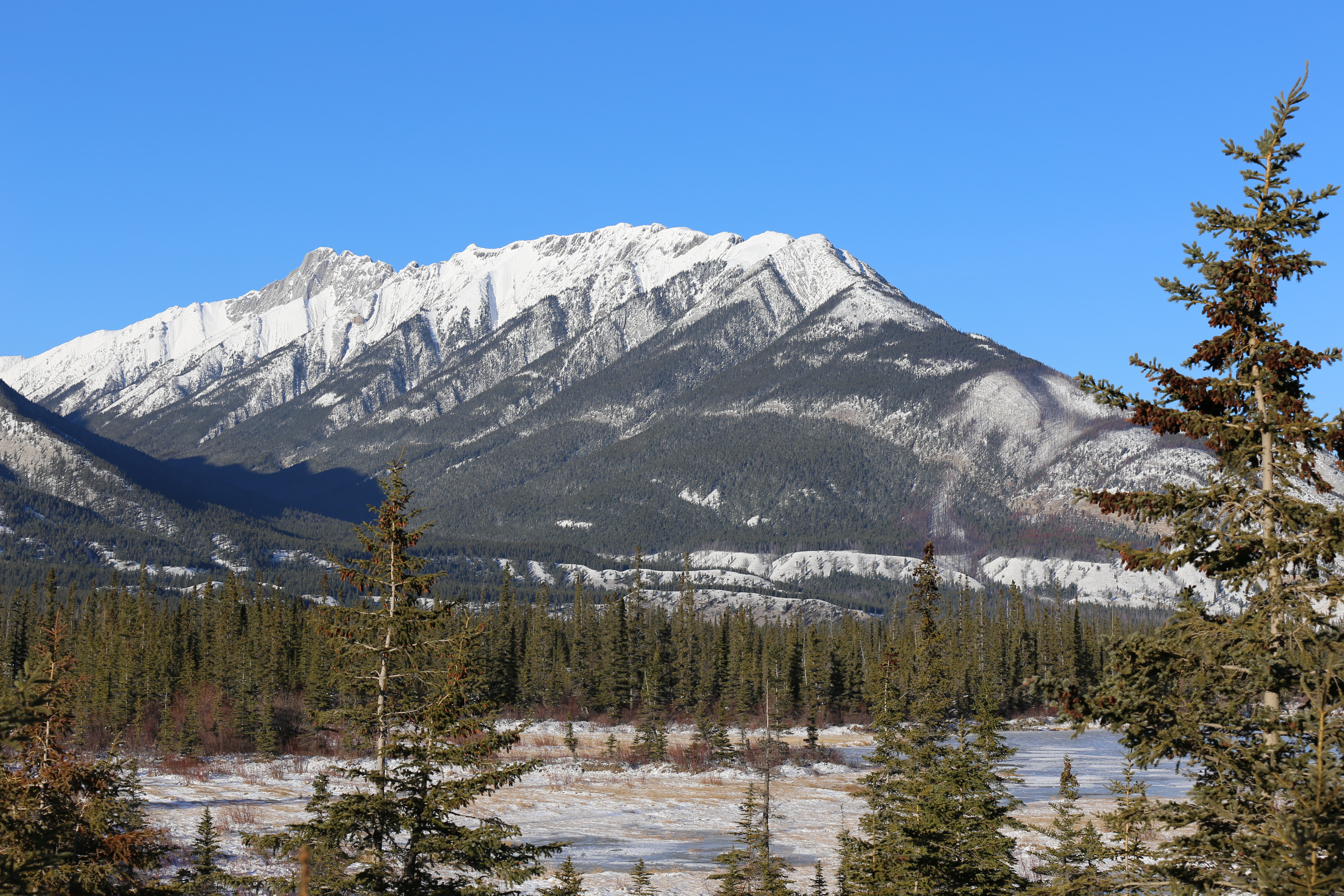
Roche de Smet from the south

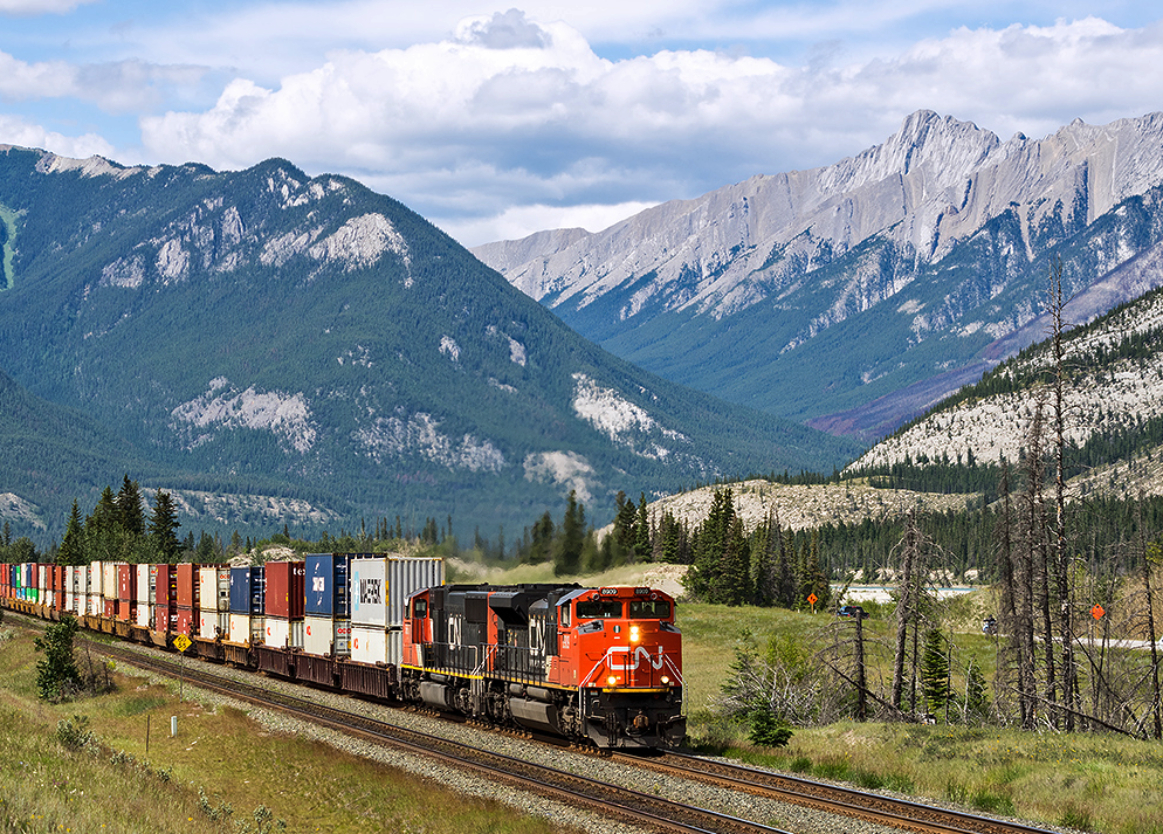
Roche de Smet in upper right

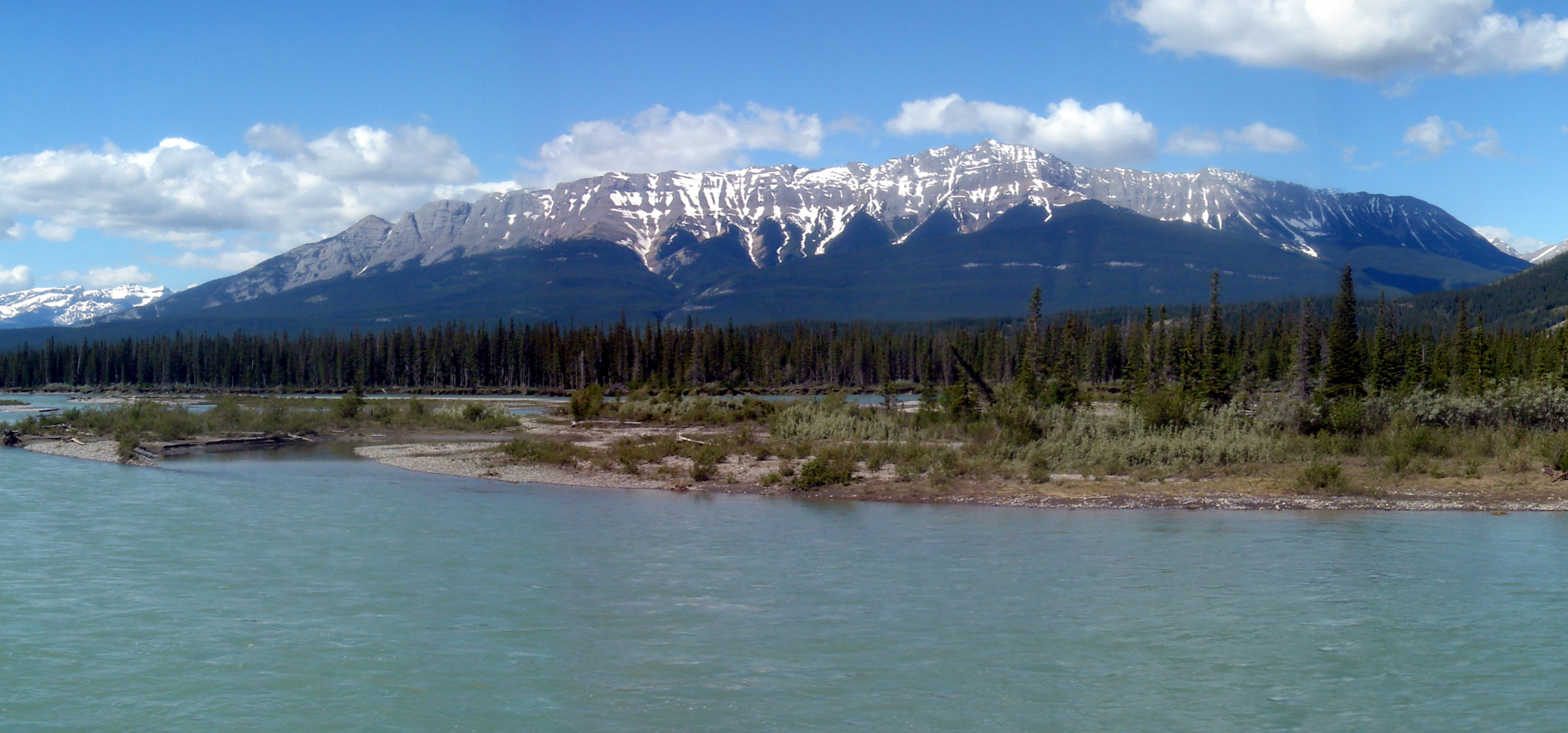
Northeast aspect of Roche de Smet

== See also ==
- Geology of the Rocky Mountains
