= Mount Merlin =

Mountain in Jasper NP, Alberta, Canada

- Location within Alberta Location within Canada

Highest point
- Elevation: 2,711 m (8,894 ft)
- Prominence: 651 m (2,136 ft)
- Parent peak: Sirdar Mountain (2,804 m)
- Listing: Mountains of Alberta
- Coordinates: 52°59′07″N 117°50′07″W

Geography
- Country: Canada
- Province: Alberta
- Protected area: Jasper National Park
- Parent range: Jacques Range; Canadian Rockies
- Topo map: NTS 83C13 Medicine Lake

Mount Merlin is the highest mountain of the Jacques Range, located in Jasper National Park, Alberta, Canada.
