= Bare Range =

Subrange of the Front Ranges in Alberta, Canada

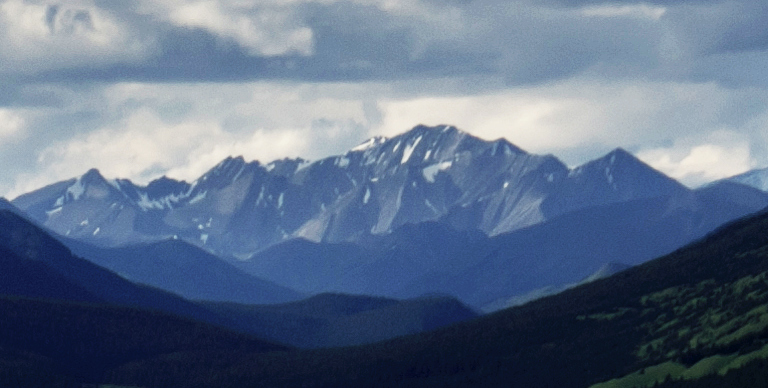
- Bare Range photographed from the top of Sulphur Mountain, 2020

Highest point
- Peak: Panther Mountain
- Elevation: 2,943 m (9,656 ft)
- Coordinates: 51°30′42″N 115°40′06″W

Dimensions
- Area: 477 km^{2} (184 mi^{2})

Geography
- Location within Alberta
- Country: Canada
- Province: Alberta
- Range coordinates: 51°34′48″N 115°43′52″W
- Parent range: Canadian Rockies

The Bare Range is a mountain range of the Canadian Rockies, located south of the Red Deer River valley in Banff National Park, Canada. The range is named for the "bareness" of or lack of trees on the gentle slopes of the range.

This range includes the following mountains and peaks:

Mountain	metres	feet
Panther Mountain	2,943	9,656
Mount White	2,755	9,039

== See also ==
- Ranges of the Canadian Rockies
