= De Smet Range =

Mountain range of the Canadian Rockies

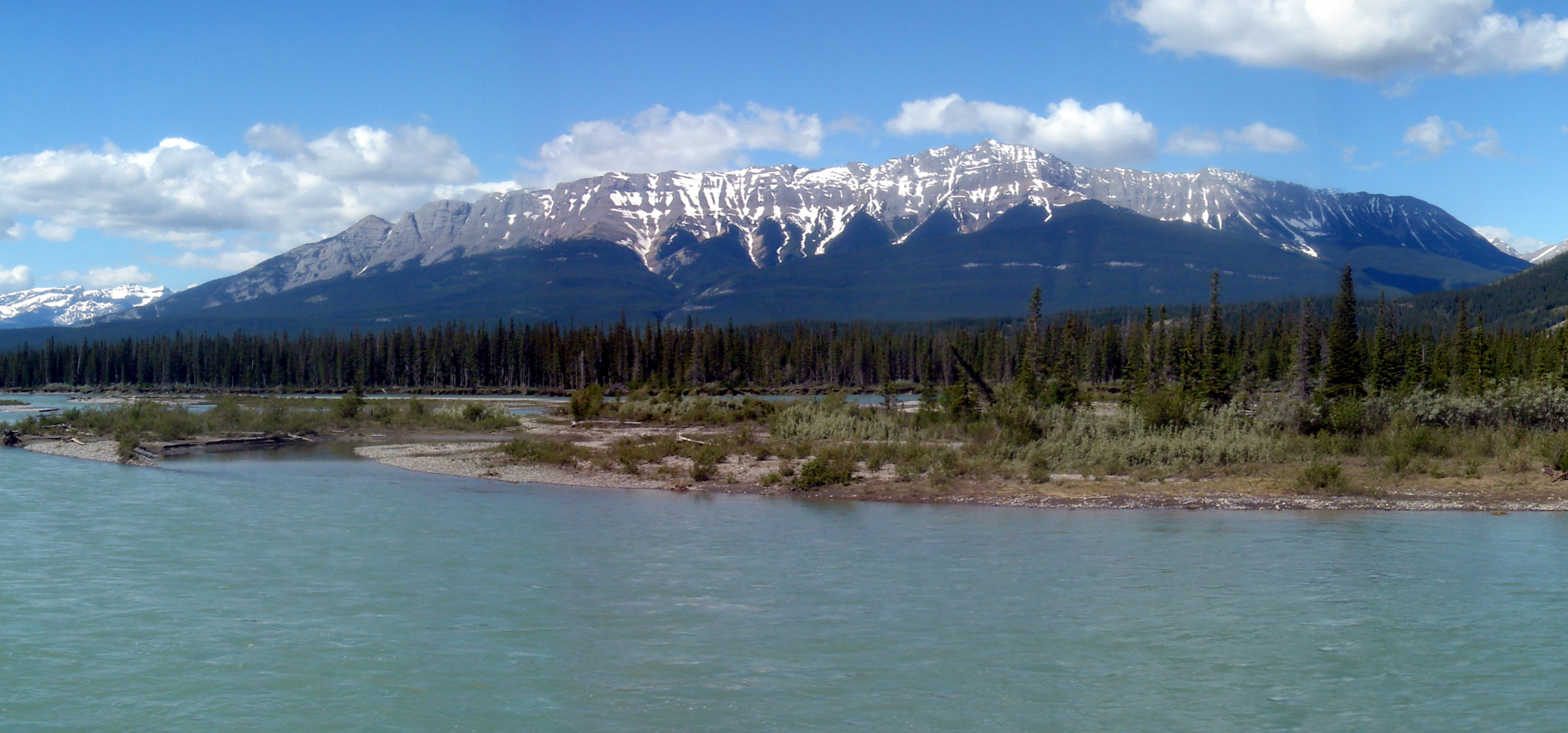
- De Smet Range and Athabasca River

Highest point
- Peak: Roche de Smet
- Elevation: 2,539 m (8,330 ft)
- Listing: Mountains of Alberta
- Coordinates: 53°08′03″N 118°06′59″W

Geography
- Location within Alberta
- Country: Canada
- Province: Alberta
- Protected area: Jasper National Park
- Range coordinates: 53°09′39″N 118°09′09″W
- Parent range: Canadian Rockies
- Topo map: NTS 83E1 Snaring River

The De Smet Range is a mountain range of the Canadian Rockies located northwest of Highway 16 and Jasper Lake in Jasper National Park, Canada. The range is named after its highest point Roche de Smet, which in turn was named by Iroquois working in the fur trade industry. The Iroquois named the peak after Pierre-Jean De Smet, a Belgian missionary who had worked with the indigenous peoples in the 1840s in Rupert's Land, the North-Western Territory, the Oregon Country and the United States.

This range includes the following mountains and peaks:

Mountain/Peak	Elevation (m/ft)	
Roche de Smet	2,539	8,330
Mount Cumnock	2,460	8,070
Mount Bistre	2,346	7,697
Mount Greenock	2,065	6,775

== See also ==
- Ranges of the Canadian Rockies
