= Bosche Range =

Mountain range in Alberta, Canada

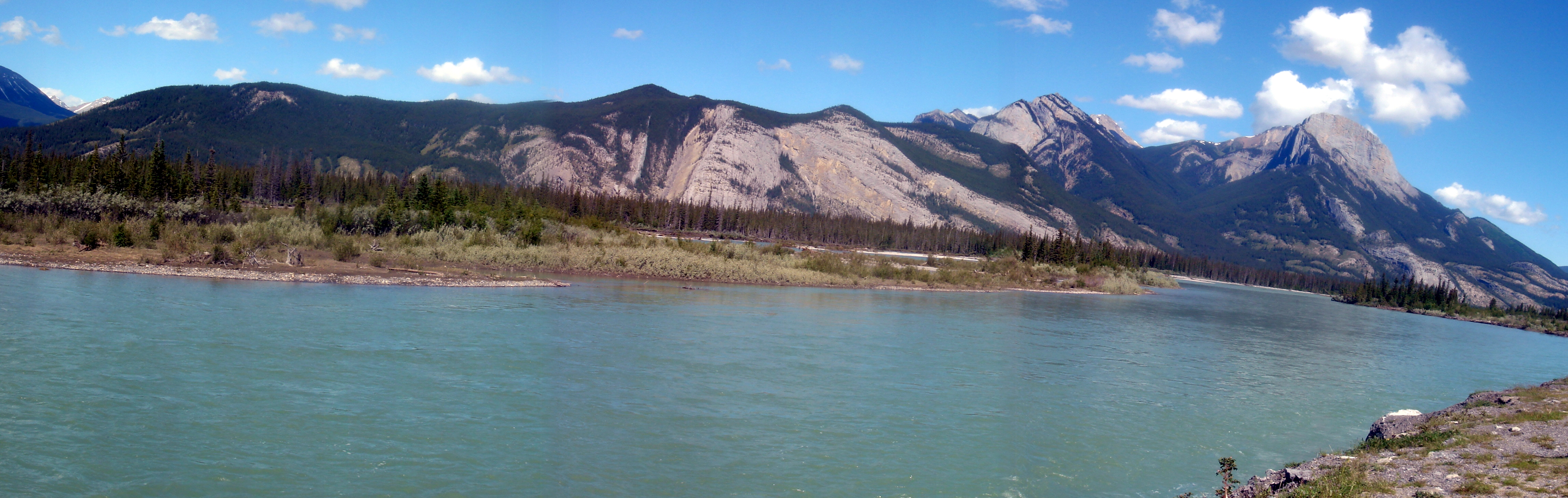
- Bosche Range and Athabasca River

Highest point
- Peak: Mount Aeolus
- Elevation: 2,643 m (8,671 ft)
- Listing: Mountains of Alberta
- Coordinates: 53°16′12″N 118°04′20″W

Dimensions
- Length: 40 km (25 mi) N-S
- Width: 28 km (17 mi) E-W
- Area: 483 km^{2} (186 mi^{2})

Geography
- Location within Alberta
- Country: Canada
- Province: Alberta
- Range coordinates: 53°18′N 118°10′W
- Parent range: Canadian Rockies
- Topo map: NTS 83E8 Rock Lake

The Bosche Range is a mountain range of the Canadian Rockies located northwest of Highway 16 near the eastern border of Jasper National Park, Canada.

This range includes the following mountains and peaks:

Mountain/Peak	Elevation (m/ft)	
Roche Ronde	2,138	7,014
Roche à Bosche	2,123	6,965
Coronach Mountain	2,462	8,077
Mount Aeolus	2,643	8,671

== See also ==
- Ranges of the Canadian Rockies
