= Rock Lake (Alberta) =

Lake in Alberta, Canada

- Location within Alberta
- Location: Yellowhead County, Alberta
- Coordinates: 53°27′35″N 118°15′46″W
- Basin countries: Canada
- Max. length: 1.6 km (0.99 mi)
- Max. width: 2.1 km (1.3 mi)
- Surface area: 2.15 km^{2} (0.83 sq mi)
- Average depth: 12.1 m (40 ft)
- Max. depth: 27.8 m (91 ft)
- Surface elevation: 1,292 m (4,239 ft)
- References: Rock Lake

Rock Lake is a lake in Alberta. It lies in extreme western Yellowhead County.

It is used recreationally (kayaking, paddleboarding, swimming, fishing, etc.) by local camp grounds and lodges.

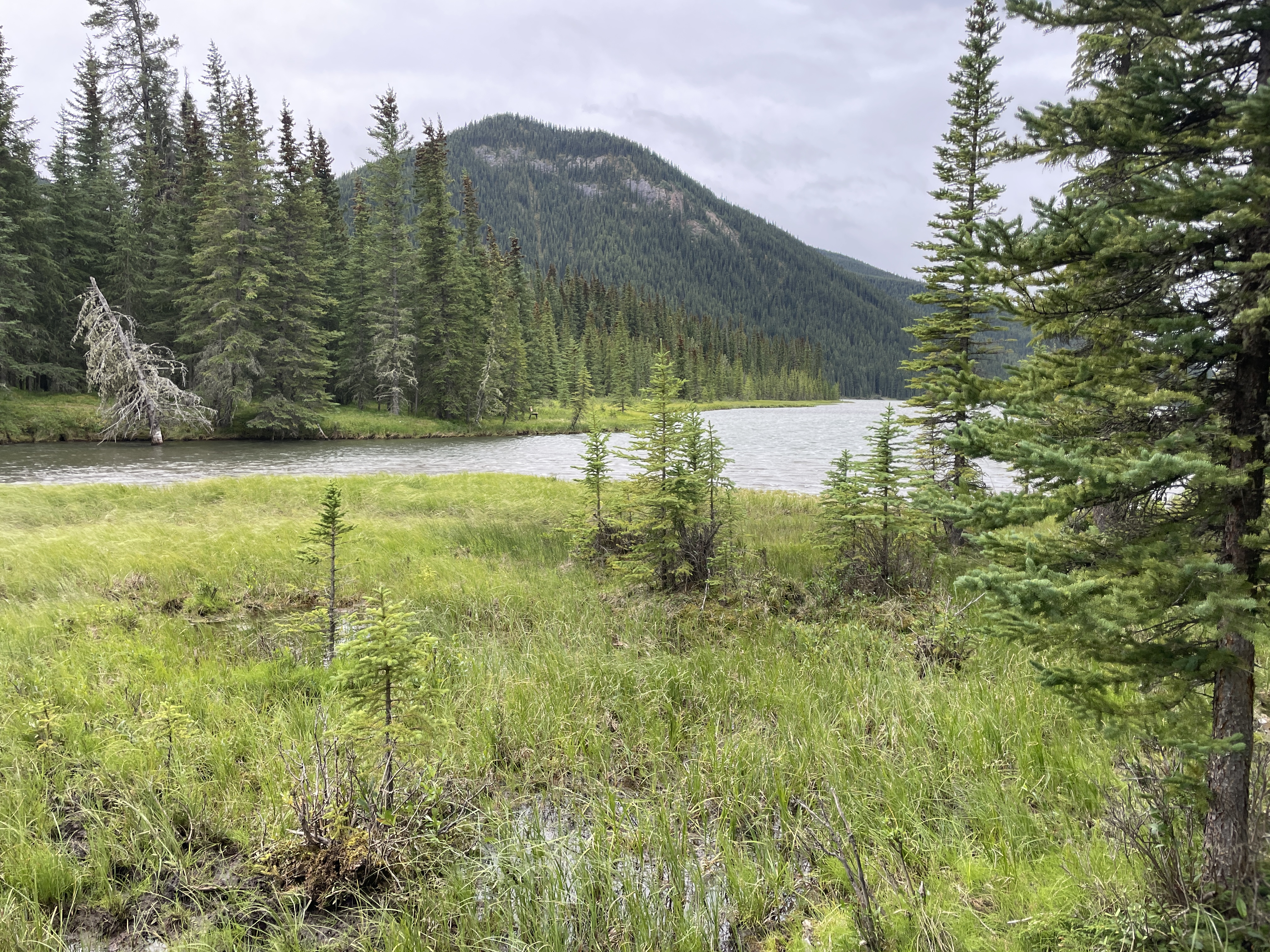
Rock Lake Outlet

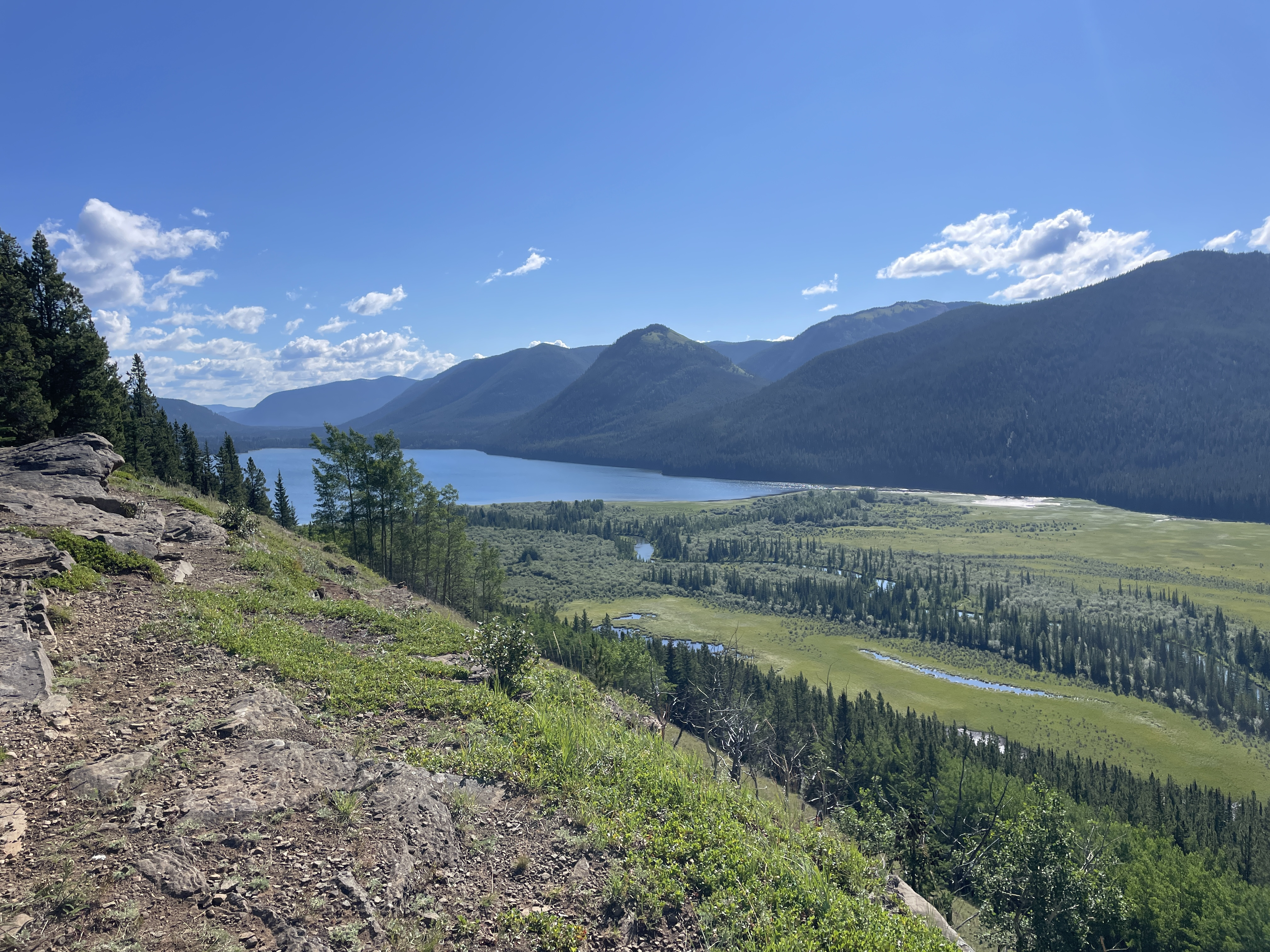
Rock Lake Staging Area View
