= Cinquefoil Mountain =

Mountain summit in Alberta, Canada

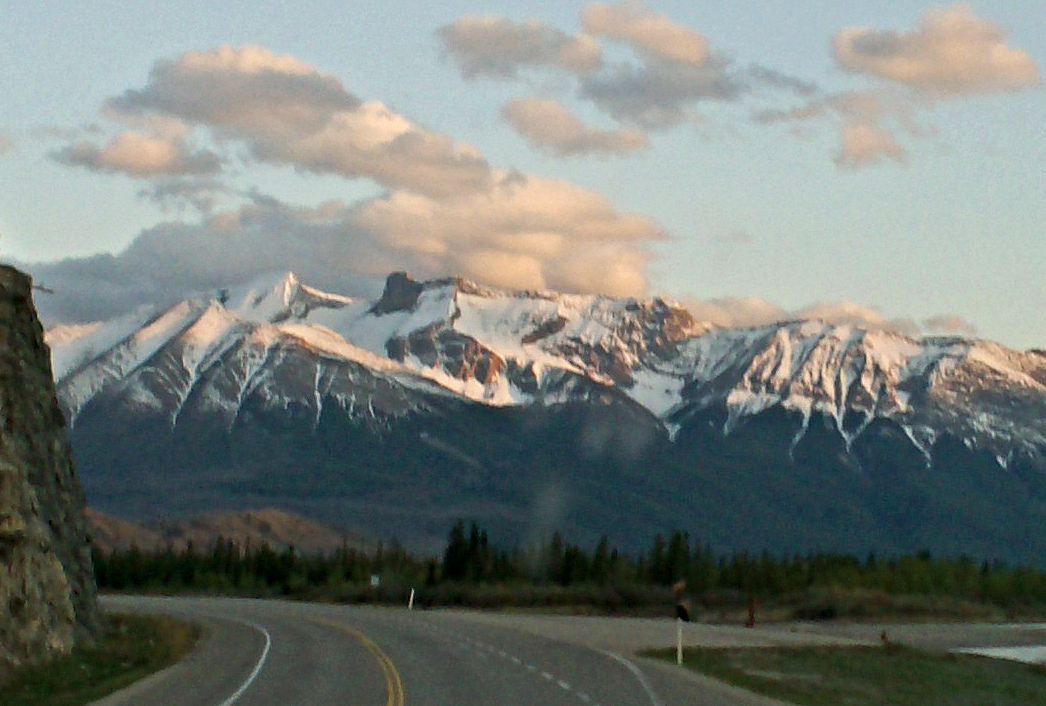
- Cinquefoil Mountain seen from Highway 16

Highest point
- Elevation: 2,256 m (7,402 ft)
- Prominence: 31 m (102 ft)
- Listing: Mountains of Alberta
- Coordinates: 53°03′16″N 117°59′55″W

Geography
- Location within Alberta Location within Canada
- Country: Canada
- Province: Alberta
- Protected area: Jasper National Park
- Parent range: Jacques Range; Canadian Rockies
- Topo map: NTS 83F4 Miette

Cinquefoil Mountain is a 2,256-metre (7,402 ft) mountain summit located in the Athabasca River valley of Jasper National Park in Alberta, Canada. It is situated in the Jacques Range of the Canadian Rockies. Cinquefoil Mountain was named in 1916 by Morrison P. Bridgland on account of cinquefoil in the area. Bridgland (1878–1948) was a Dominion Land Surveyor who named many peaks in Jasper Park and the Canadian Rockies. The mountain's name was officially adopted in 1928 by the Geographical Names Board of Canada.

== Climate ==
Based on the Köppen climate classification, Cinquefoil Mountain is located in a subarctic climate with cold, snowy winters, and mild summers. Temperatures can drop below -20 °C with wind chill factors below -30 °C. Precipitation runoff from Cinquefoil Mountain drains into tributaries of the Athabasca River.

== See also ==
- Geology of the Rocky Mountains
