= Mount Aeolus (Alberta) =

Mountain in Alberta, Canada

- Location within Alberta

Highest point
- Elevation: 2,643 m (8,671 ft)
- Prominence: 1,223 m (4,012 ft)
- Listing: Mountains of Alberta
- Coordinates: 53°16′12″N 118°04′20″W

Geography
- Location: Alberta, Canada
- Parent range: Bosche Range
- Topo map: NTS 83E8 Rock Lake

Mount Aeolus is a mountain located in the Bosche Range in Alberta, Canada. The mountain was named for Aeolus, the Greek god of winds. The summit was so named on account of frequent windy conditions near it.
