= Mount Coulthard =

Mountain in the country of Canada

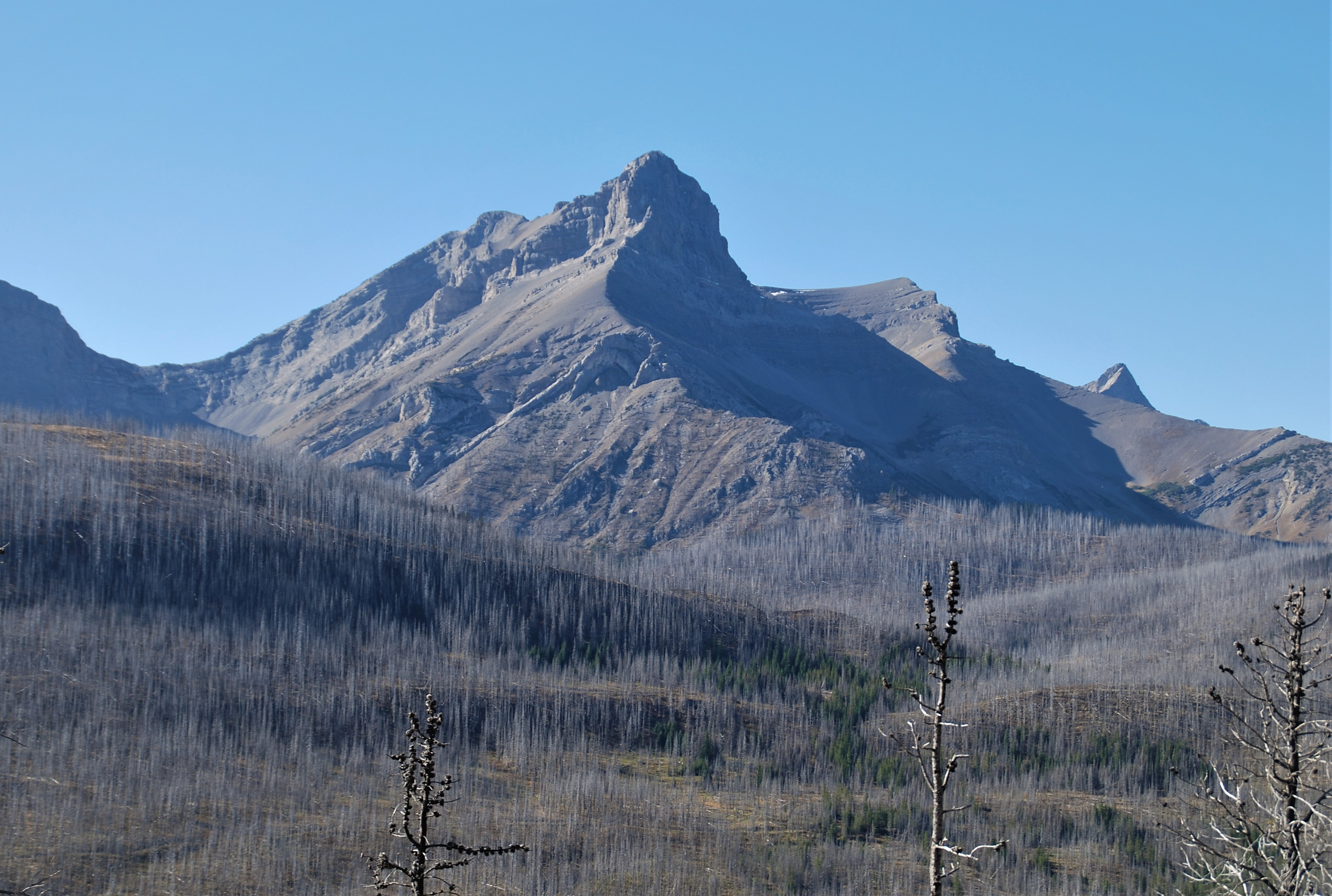
- East aspect

Highest point
- Elevation: 2,645 m (8,678 ft)
- Prominence: 255 m (837 ft)
- Parent peak: Andy Good Peak (2,662 m)
- Isolation: 1.38 km (0.86 mi)
- Coordinates: 49°33′29″N 114°34′13″W

Naming
- Etymology: R. W. Coulthard (1875–1946)

Geography
- Location within Alberta Location within Canada
- Interactive map of Mount Coulthard
- Location: Castle Wildland Provincial Park; Alberta, Canada
- Parent range: Flathead Range; Canadian Rockies
- Topo map: NTS 82G10 Crowsnest

Geology
- Mountain type: Fault block
- Rock type: Limestone

Climbing
- Easiest route: Scrambling via NW slope

Mount Coulthard is a mountain straddling the border between Alberta and British Columbia in Canada. It is part of the Flathead Range which is a subset of the Canadian Rockies. The mountain is set on the Continental Divide, in Castle Wildland Provincial Park. It is situated in the Crowsnest Pass area and can be seen from Highway 3, the Crowsnest Highway.

Mount Coulthard is named after Major Robert Wilson Coulthard (born December 6, 1875), a prominent Canadian mining engineer. He was general manager of the West Canadian Coal Company, engineer at Crow's Nest Pass Coal Company from 1901 to 1908, and a Major with the 2nd Canadian Tunnelling Company. The mountain's toponym was officially adopted in 1928 by the Geographical Names Board of Canada.

== Geology ==
Mount Coulthard is composed of limestone, a sedimentary rock laid down during the Precambrian to Jurassic periods. Formed in shallow seas, this sedimentary rock was pushed east and over the top of younger Cretaceous period rock during the Laramide orogeny.

Mount Coulthard contains a 370 m (1,210 ft) long and 61.2 m (201 ft) deep cave on its northern face called Coulthard Cave. It was discovered in 1968 by Monica and Tammy Morris and has a 7 m (23 ft) in diameter entrance.

== Climate ==
Based on the Köppen climate classification, Mount Coulthard has an alpine subarctic climate with cold, snowy winters, and mild summers. Winter temperatures can drop below −20 °C with wind chill factors below −30 °C.

== Gallery ==
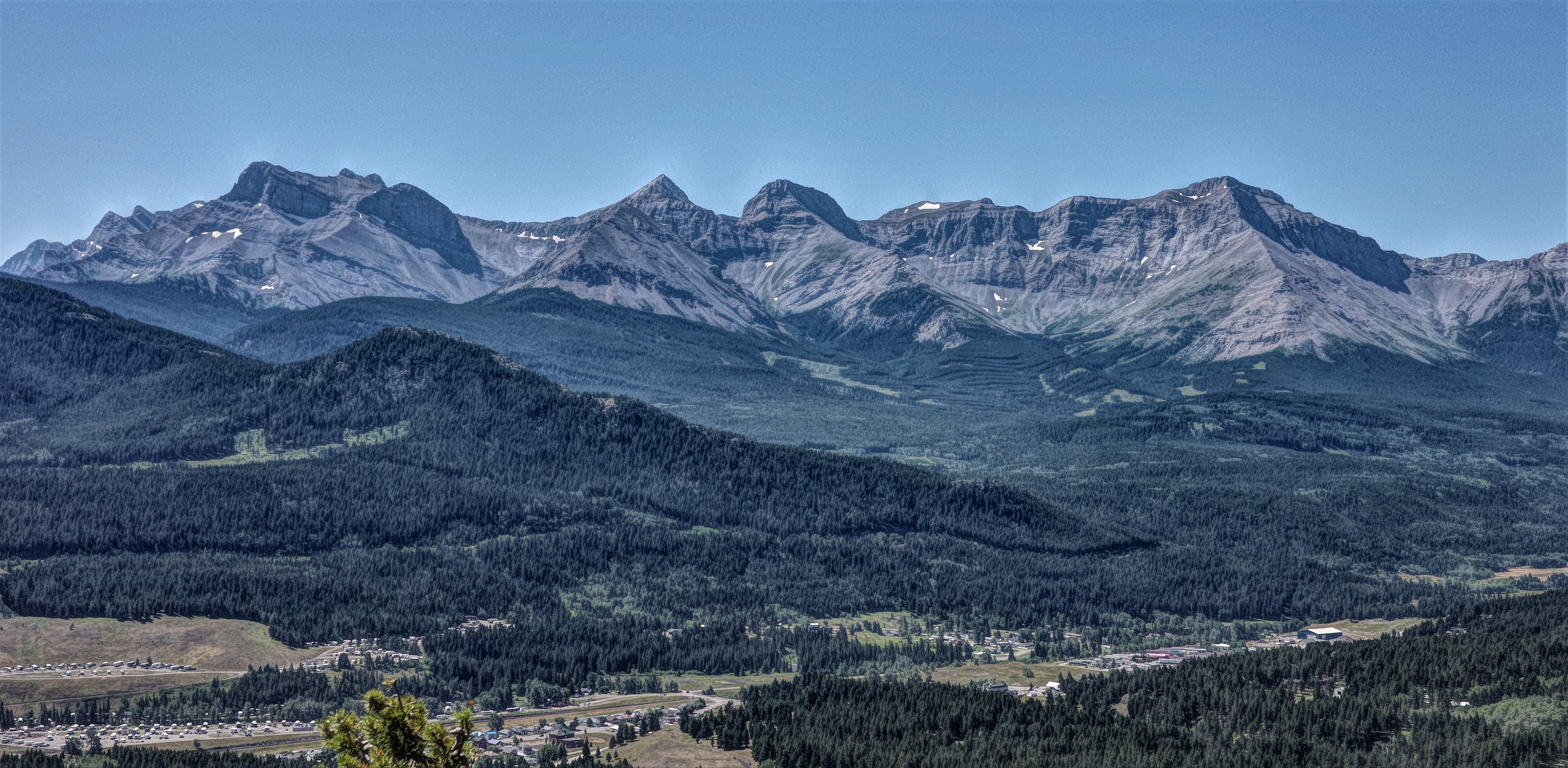
Flathead Range
L→Rː Mt. Coulthard, Mt. McLaren, Andy Good Peak, Mt. Parrish, Chinook Peak

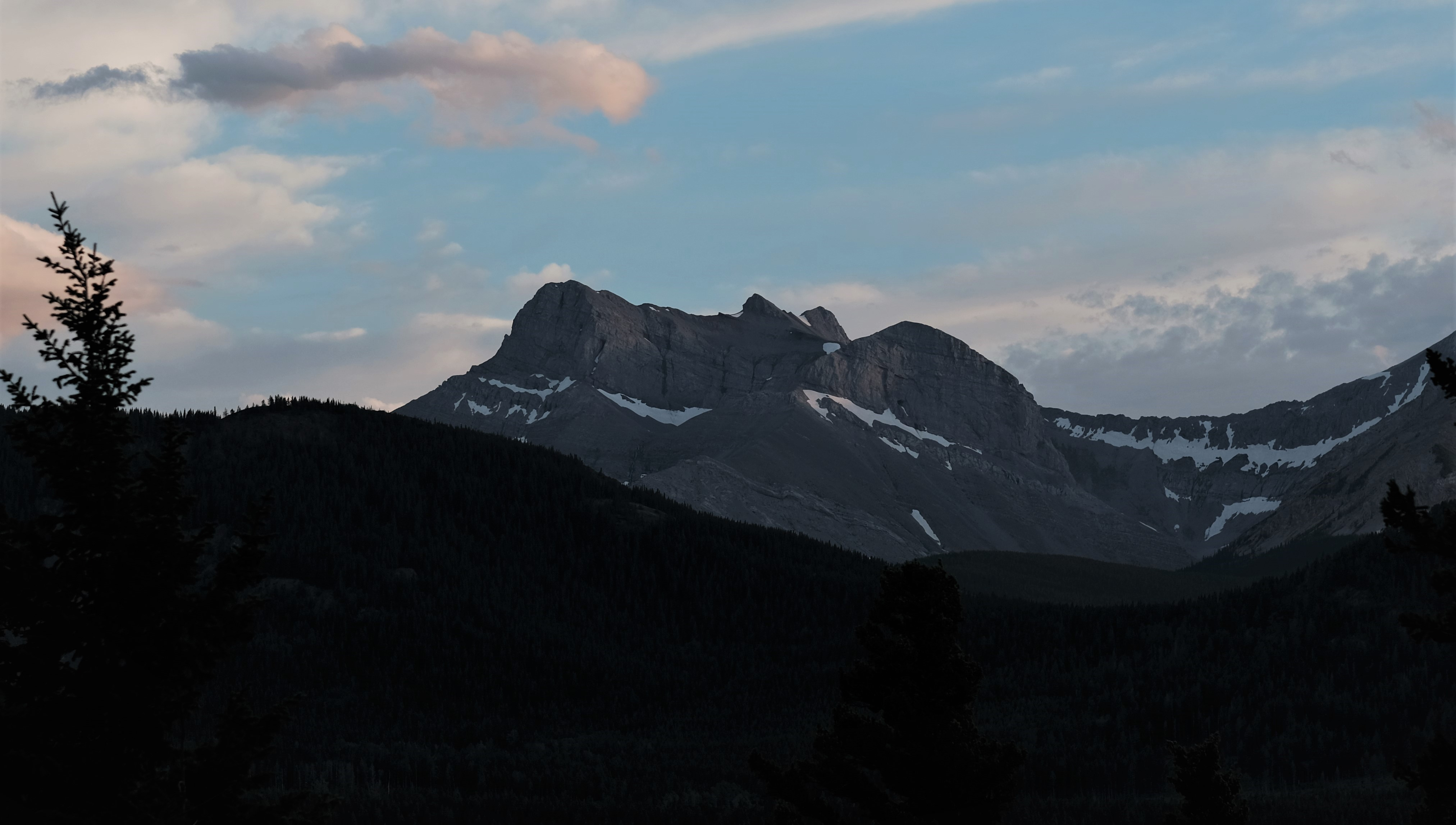
Mt. Coulthard, northeast aspect
