= Mount Parrish =

Mountain in the country of Canada

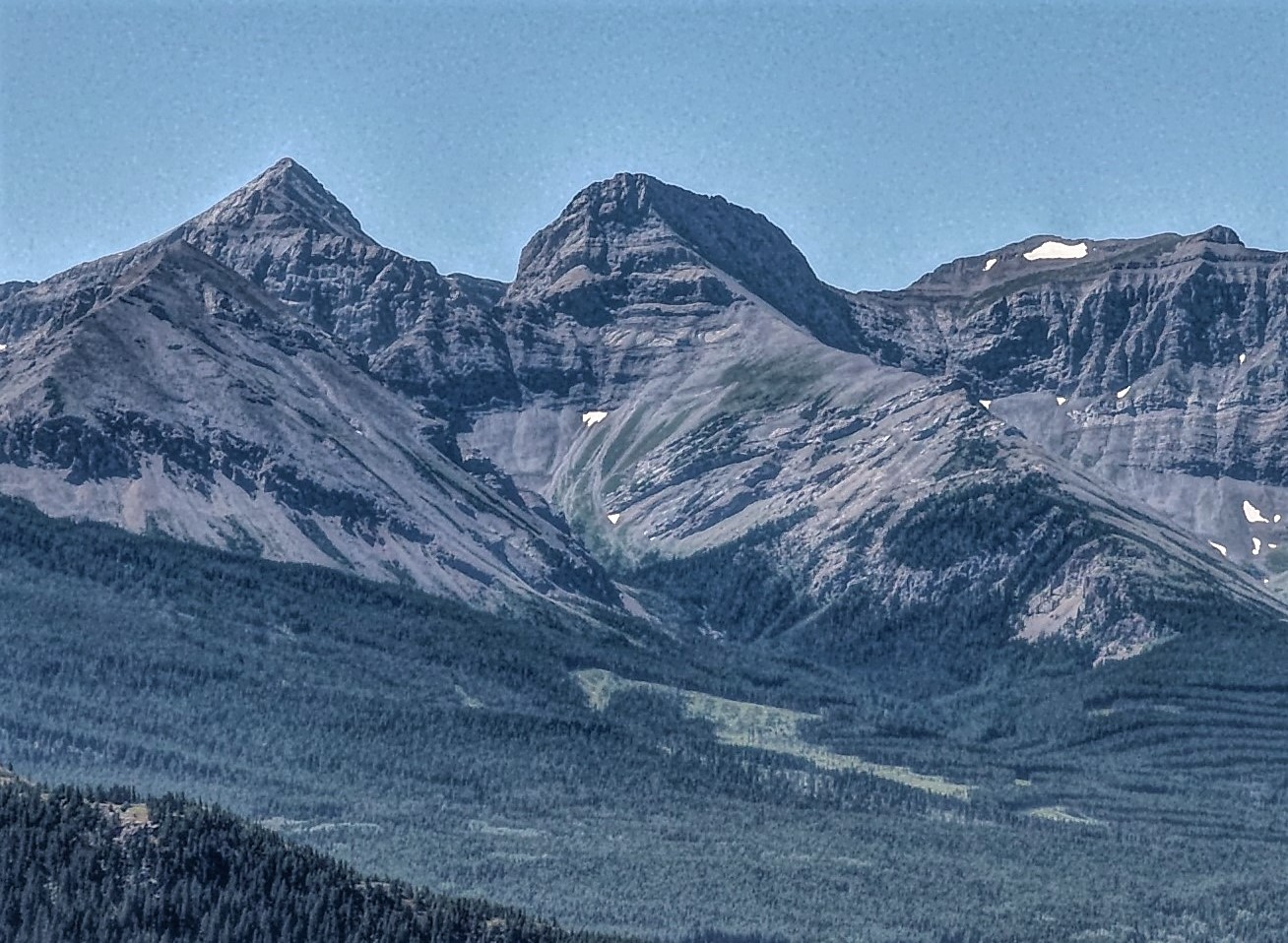
- Mount Parrish (centre), from northeast (Andy Good Peak to left)

Highest point
- Elevation: 2,530 m (8,301 ft)
- Prominence: 161 m (528 ft)
- Parent peak: Chinook Peak (2,591 m)
- Isolation: 0.73 km (0.45 mi)
- Listing: Mountains of Alberta
- Coordinates: 49°34′30″N 114°35′17″W

Naming
- Etymology: Sherman Parrish

Geography
- Location within Alberta Location within Canada
- Interactive map of Mount Parrish
- Location: Castle Wildland Provincial Park; Alberta, Canada
- Parent range: Flathead Range; Canadian Rockies
- Topo map: NTS 82G10 Crowsnest

Geology
- Mountain type: Fault block
- Rock type: Limestone

Climbing
- Easiest route: class 4+ climbing

Mount Parrish is a 2,530-metre (8,301-foot) mountain summit located in Alberta, Canada.

== Description ==
Mount Parrish is situated eight kilometers southwest of the town of Coleman in the Crowsnest Pass area and can be seen from Highway 3, the Crowsnest Highway. It is part of the Flathead Range which is a subset of the Canadian Rockies. The peak is set one kilometer east of the Continental Divide, in Castle Wildland Provincial Park. Precipitation runoff from the mountain drains into tributaries of the nearby Crowsnest River. Topographic relief is significant as the summit rises 1,190 m (3,900 ft) above the river in 5 km (3.1 mi). Chinook Peak is 2 km (1.2 mi) to the northwest of Mt. Parrish and the nearest higher neighbor is Andy Good Peak, 1 km (0.62 mi) to the south.

== History ==
Mount Parrish is named after Sherman Parrish, an early settler in the Crowsnest Pass area in 1898. He homesteaded at the foot of this mountain and raised cattle. The mountain's toponym was officially adopted March 15, 1962, by the Geographical Names Board of Canada.

On January 19, 1946, a Royal Canadian Air Force DC-3 struck Mount Ptolemy and crashed into the North York Creek valley below Mount Parrish. All seven crewmembers perished in the accident. Some wreckage of the aircraft is still present.

== Geology ==
Mount Parrish is composed of limestone which is a sedimentary rock laid down during the Precambrian to Jurassic periods. Formed in shallow seas, this sedimentary rock was pushed east and over the top of younger Cretaceous period rock during the Laramide orogeny.

== Climate ==
Based on the Köppen climate classification, Mount Parrish has an alpine subarctic climate with cold, snowy winters, and mild summers. Winter temperatures can drop below −20 °C with wind chill factors below −30 °C.

== Gallery ==
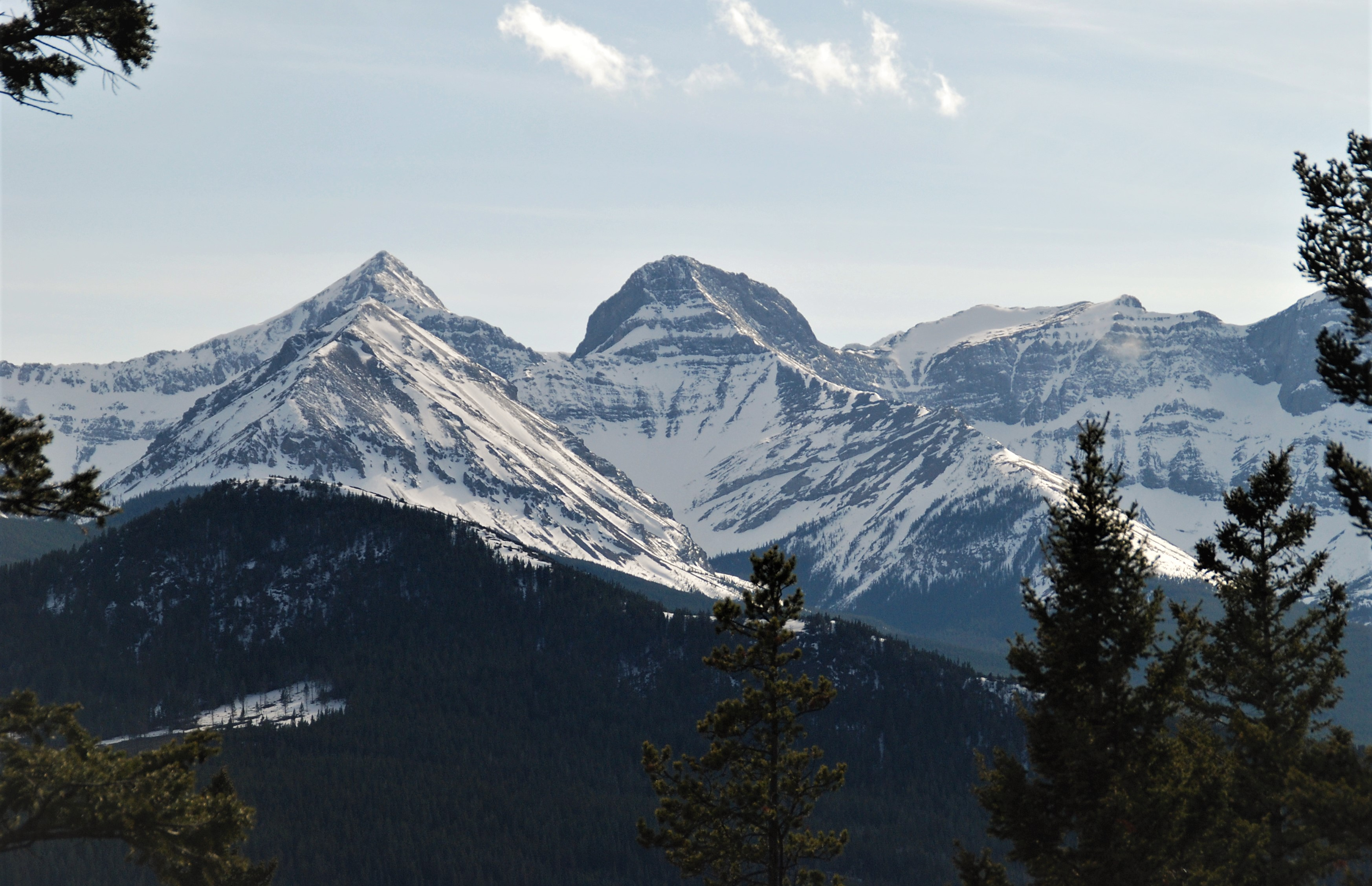
Mt. McLaren, with Andy Good Peak (behind), and Mt. Parrish (centre)

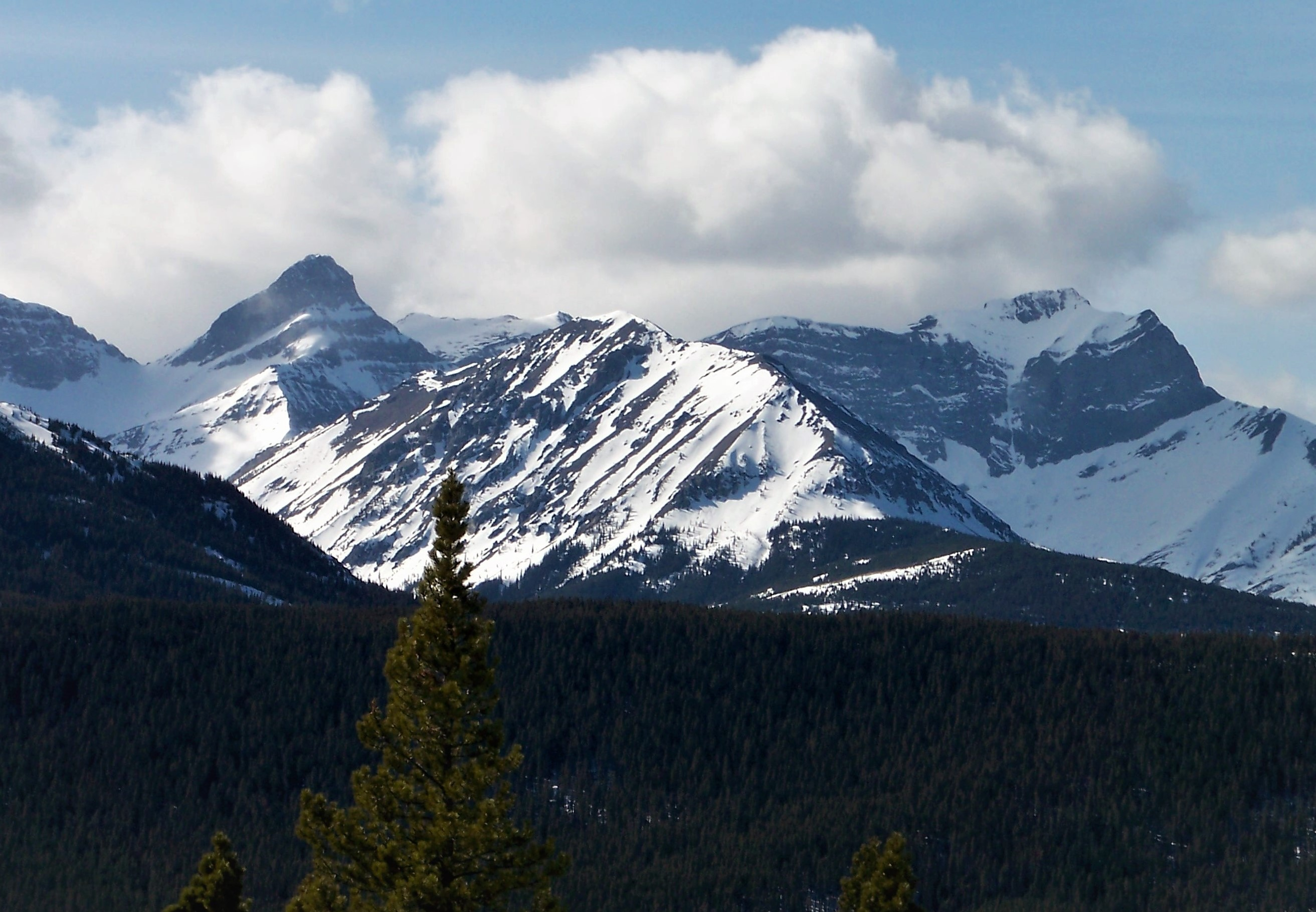
Mount Parrish (left), Mount McLaren (centered), and Chinook Peak (right)

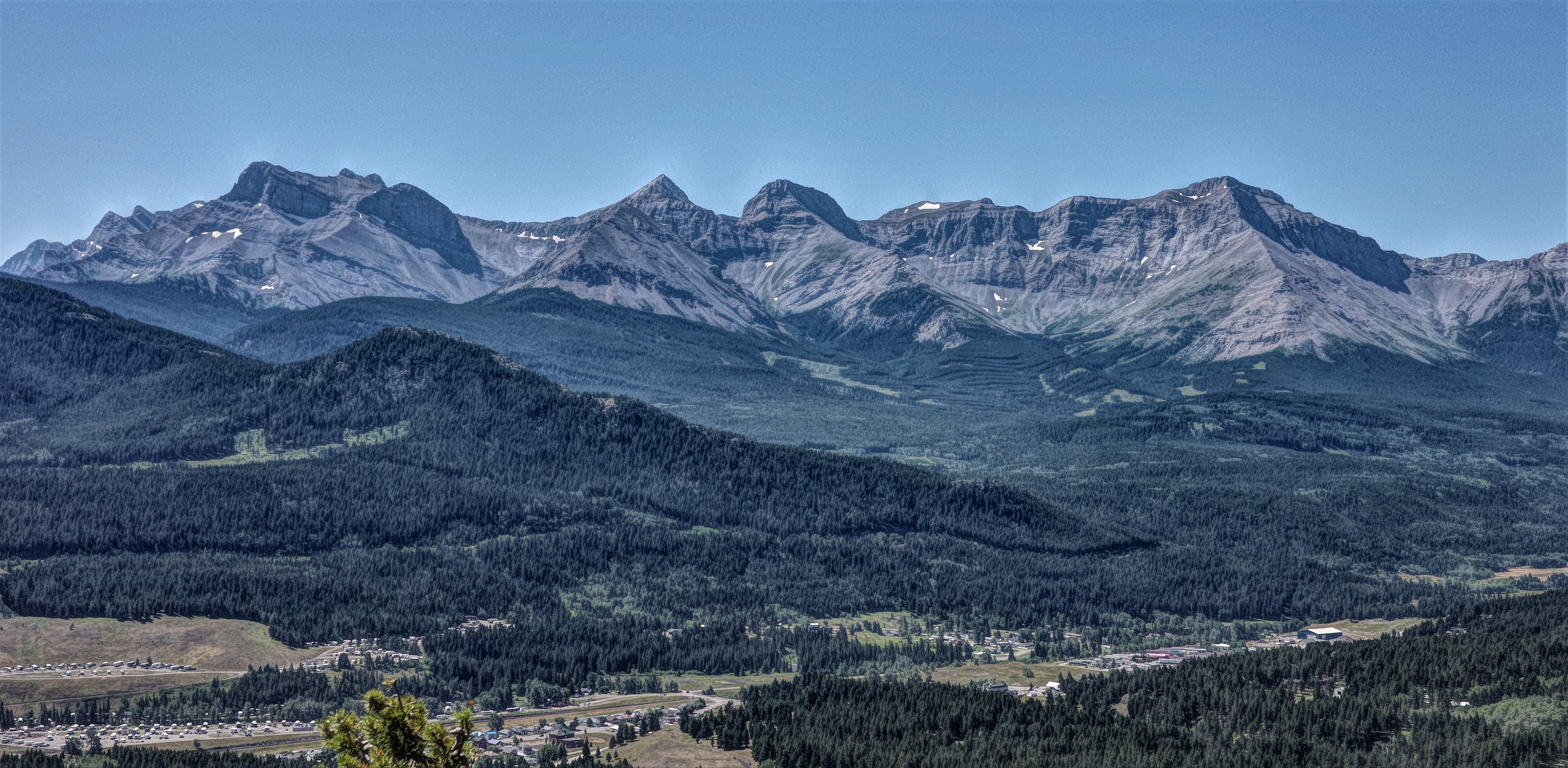
Flathead Range
L→Rː Mt. Coulthard, Mt. McLaren, Andy Good Peak, Mt. Parrish, Chinook Peak

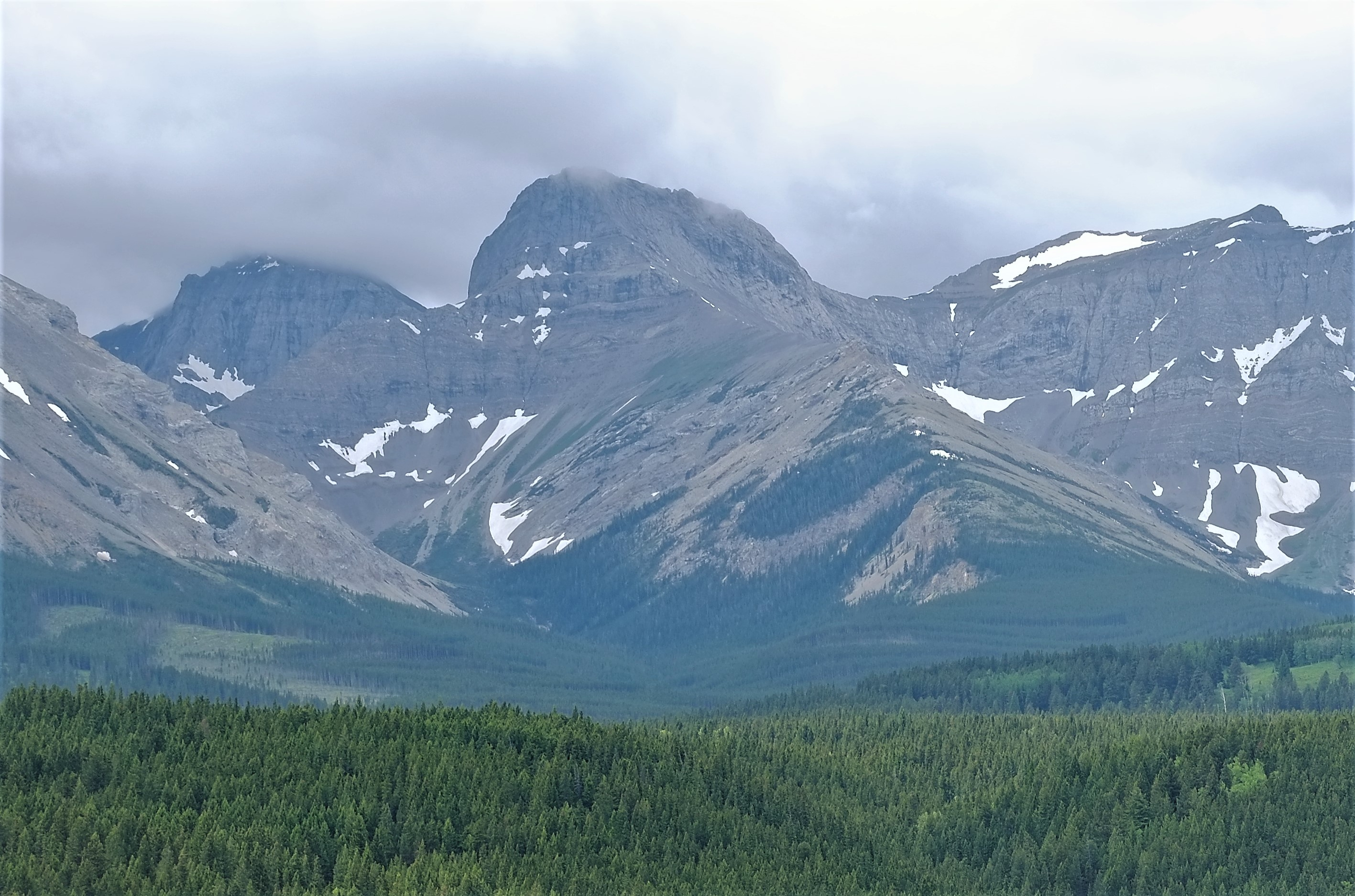
North aspect

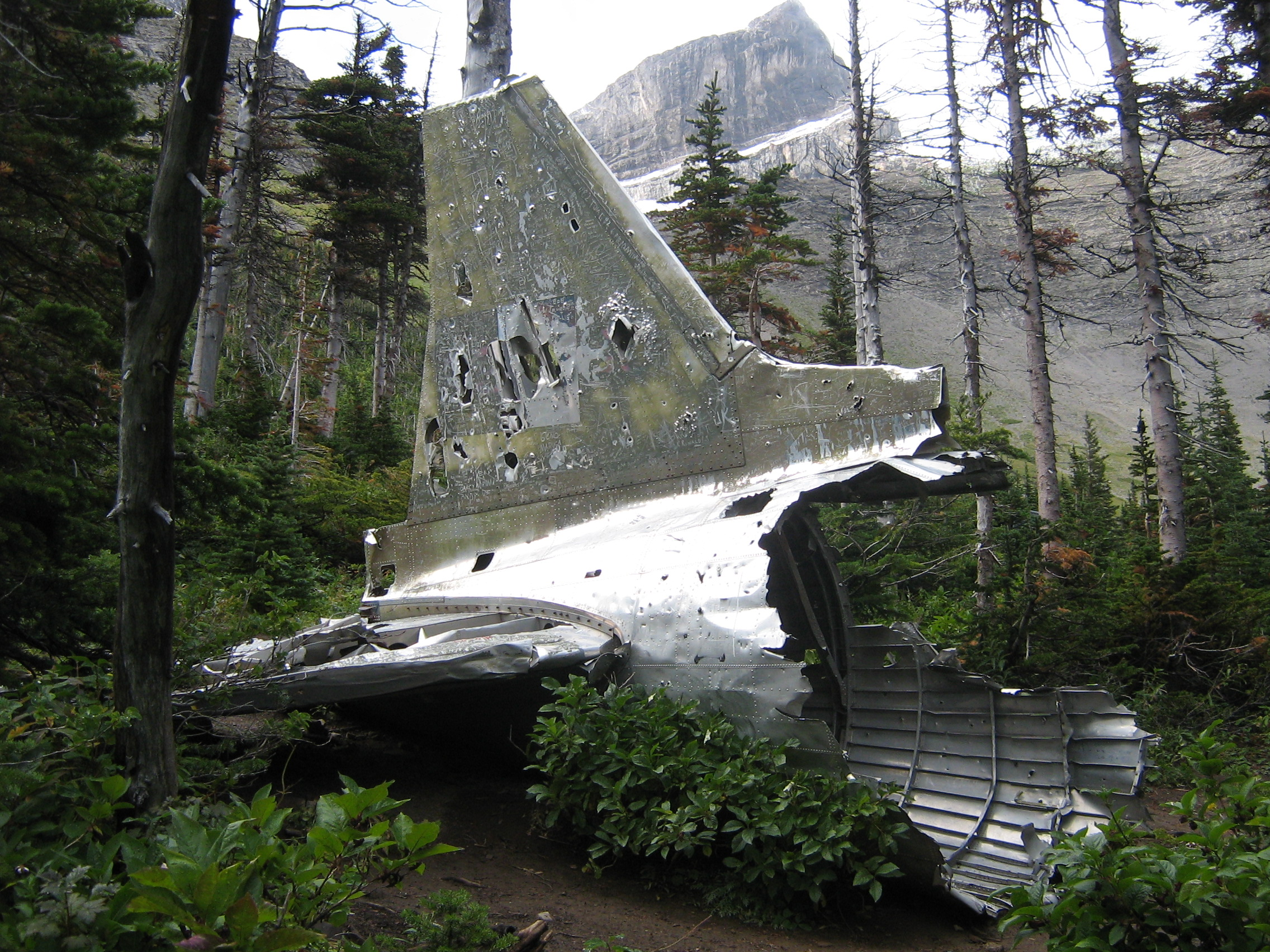
DC-3 wreckage below Mt. Parrish

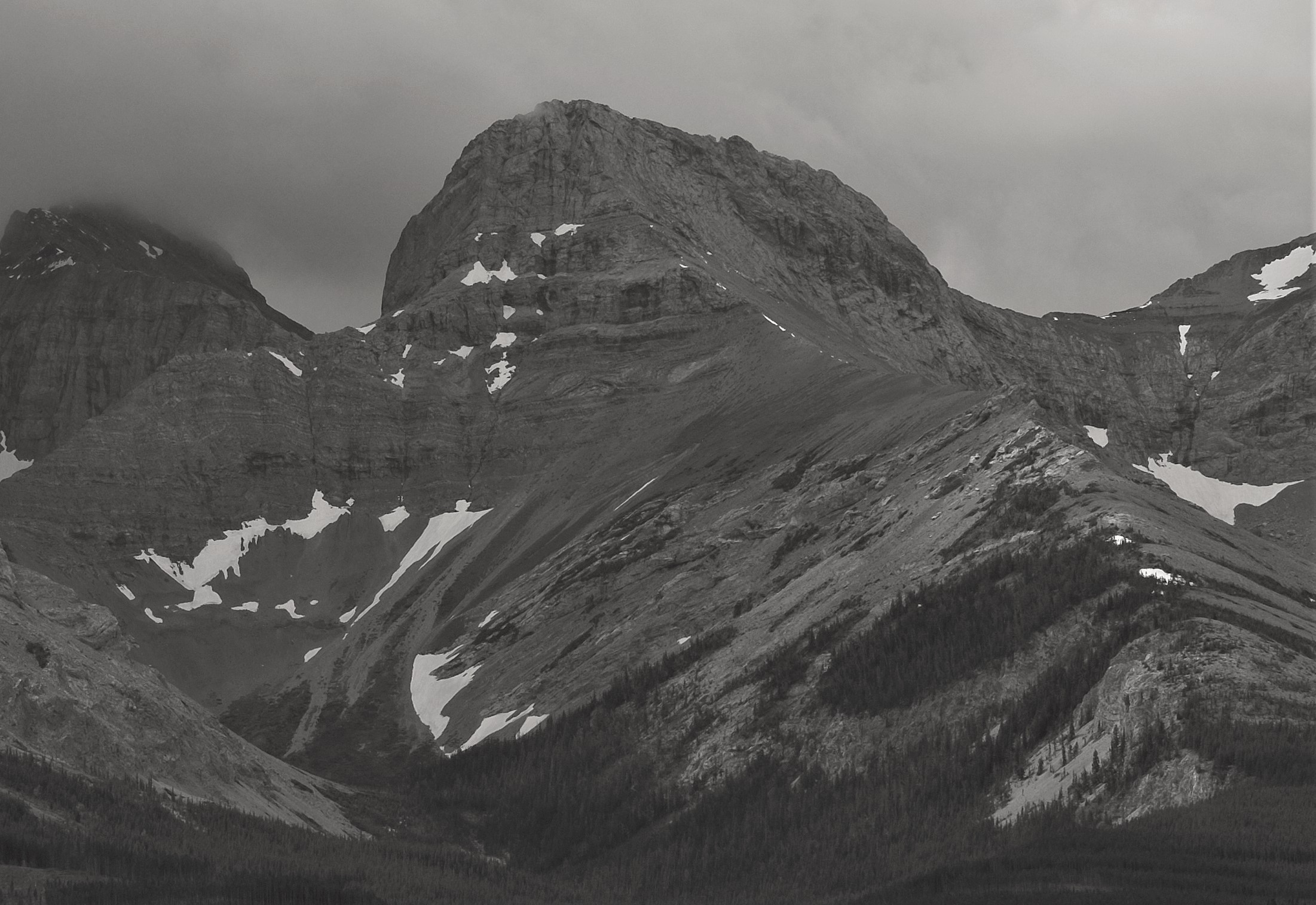
North aspect

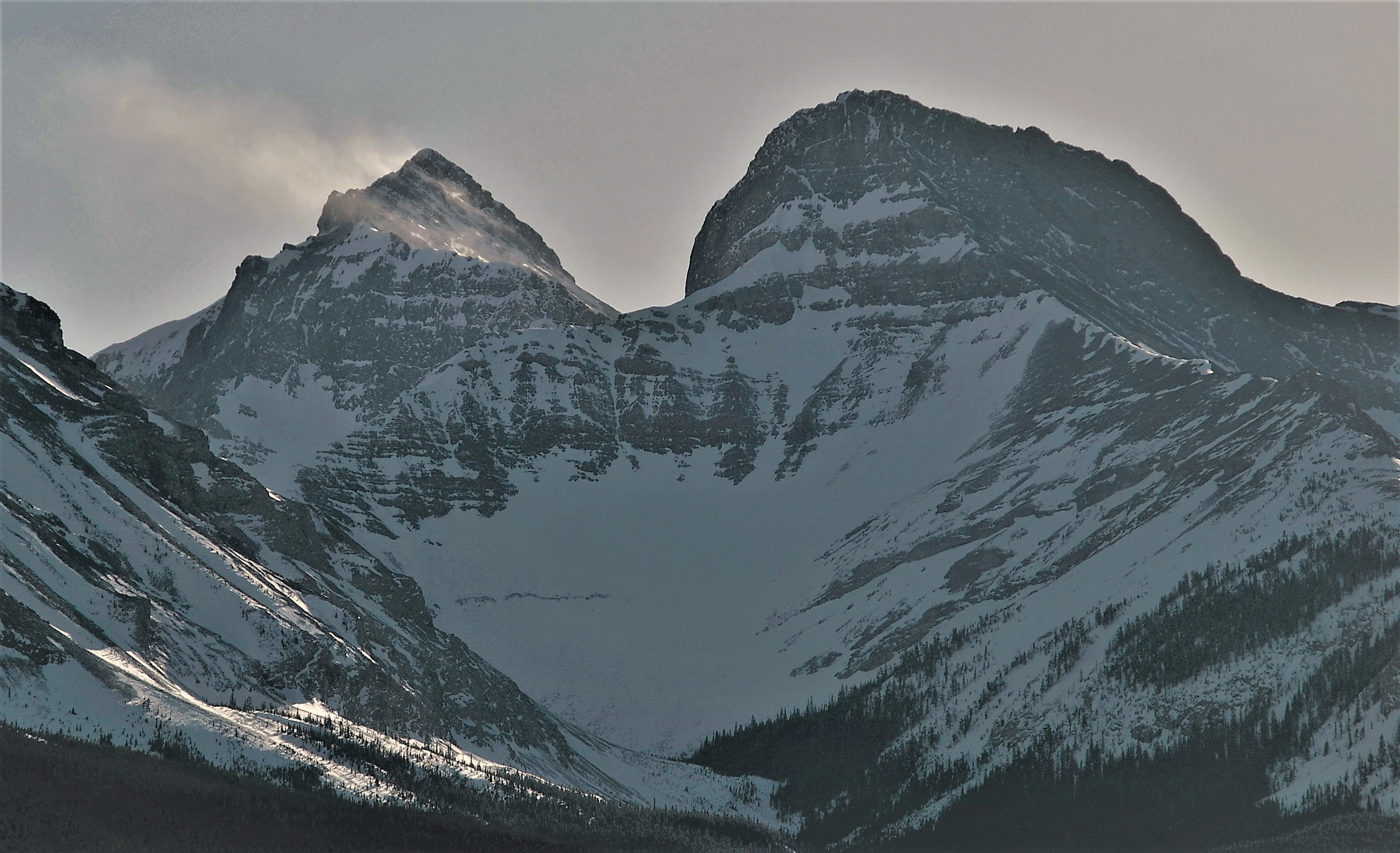
Mount Parrish (right), (Andy Good Peak to left)

== See also ==
- Geology of Alberta
- Geography of Alberta
