= Castle Provincial Park =

Provincial park in Alberta, Canada

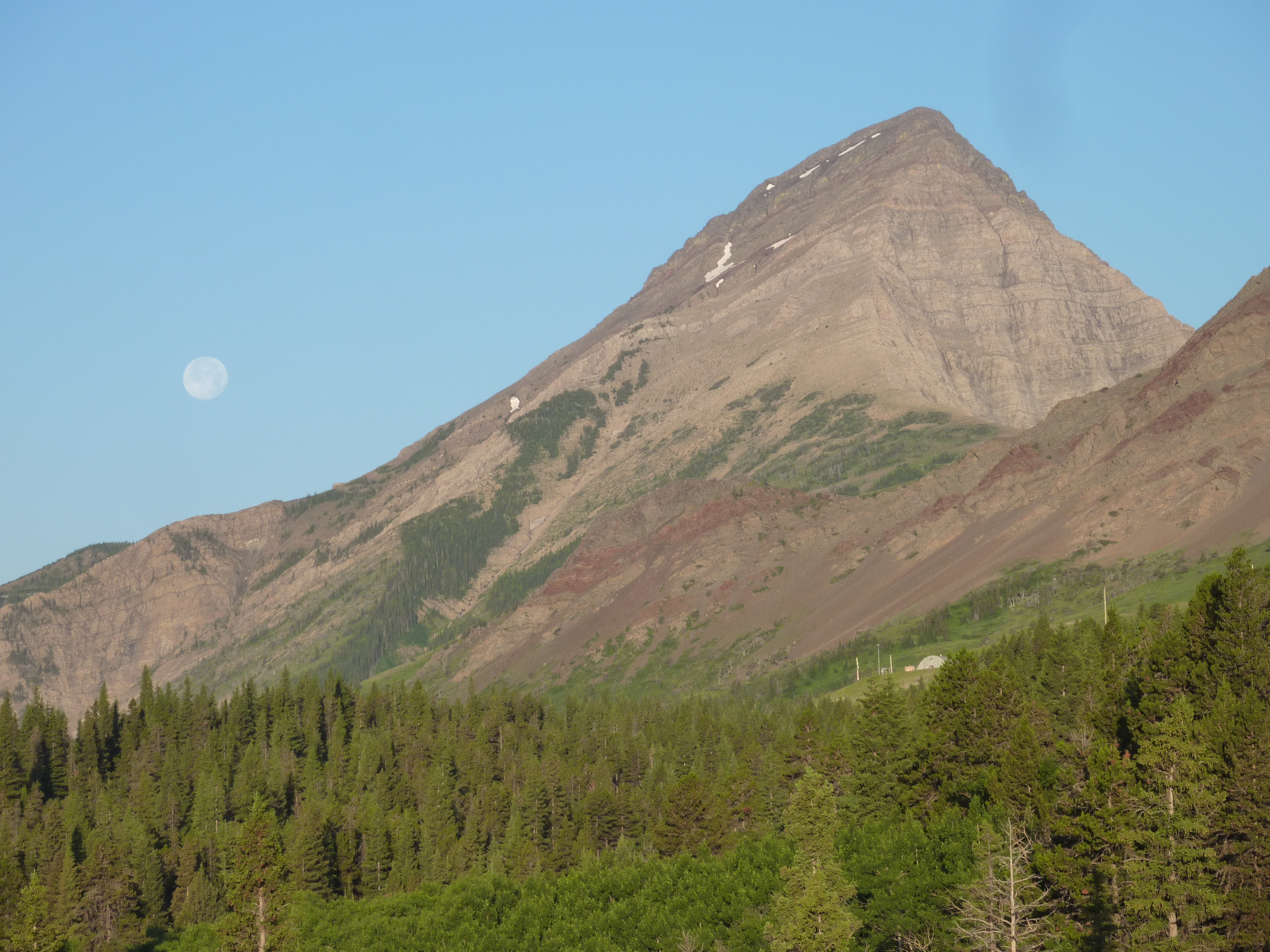

- Location within Alberta
- Location: Alberta Canada
- Nearest city: Crowsnest Pass, Pincher Creek
- Coordinates: 49.444°N 114.117°W
- Area: 25,501 ha (63,010 acres)
- Established: February 16, 2017
- Governing body: Alberta Parks

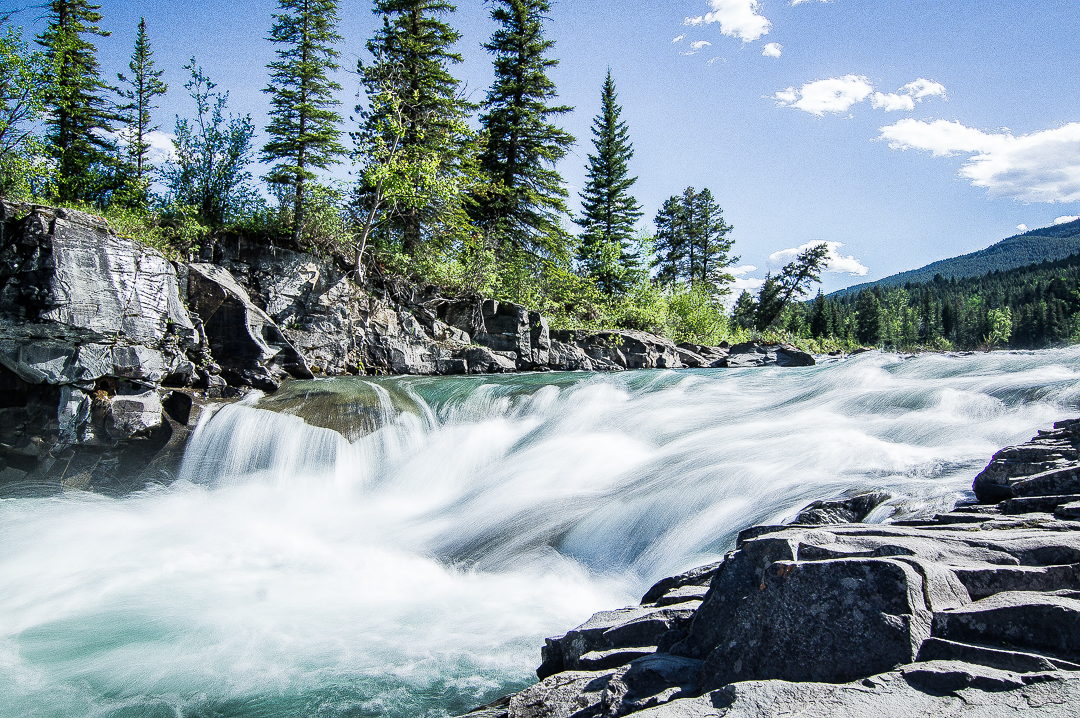
Castle Falls on Castle River within the Park

Castle Provincial Park is a provincial park in southern Alberta, Canada. It is located within the Municipal District of Pincher Creek No. 9 south of the Municipality of Crowsnest Pass, northwest of Waterton Lakes National Park and west of the Town of Pincher Creek. It shares a boundary with Castle Wildland Provincial Park to the west and south.

The designation of Castle Provincial Park was approved on January 20, 2017, with an effective date of February 16, 2017. The designation involved the protection of 25,501 ha (63,010 acres) of land. The namesake is derived from Windsor Ridge and the West and South Castle Rivers that flow through the park. The park is an important link in the Crown of the Continent Ecosystem, providing a habitat and migratory corridor for a variety of wildlife such as grizzly bears, black bears, wolverines, cougars, bobcats, deer, elk, and moose.

Visitors amenities at the Castle Provincial Park include four campgrounds, one group use campground, comfort camping, and multiple staging areas for day use. Camp Impeesa is also situated on the Beaver Mines Lake, run by Scouts Canada. Furthermore, random camping exists throughout the park and situated at the end of the main highway in the park is Castle Mountain Resort, a ski resort. Popular activities include camping, hiking, boating, skiing, horseback riding, hunting, mountain biking, and fishing.

== History ==
=== Indigenous history ===
The first known people in the Castle Provincial Park was the Kutenai and Piikani First Nations. Their history with the land is over 10,000 years old and they called the area "A'saani", meaning scared paint. This region was used for spiritual ceremonies and to sustain their ways of life through hunting, food gathering, and the removal of firewood. These First Nations People were the guides of early explorers and traders in the Castle. When Western Canada began settlement, the indigenous populations declined due to clashes with the Niitsitapi, Ktunaxa, smallpox, and the designation of reservations beginning in 1855 with the Lame Bull Treaty.

=== Early exploration ===
Trade and settlement began east on the prairies earlier than in the Castle. Early surveyors included Peter Fidler and David Thompson, but exploration began with the Palliser Expedition in 1841, led by James Sinclair. The Hudson's Bay Company, who funded the Palliser Expedition, was interested in more efficient trade routes over the mountains and the British government was interested in growing Canada westward. In 1857, John Palliser entered the area in search of the quickest route over the Continental Divide, crossing over the North Kootenany Pass and into the Flathead Valley in August 1858. Additionally, in 1858 Thomas Blakiston entered the region, who is more commonly known for his explorations in the Waterton Lakes National Park. Early geological studies were first performed from 1857 to 1859 by Dr. James Hector of the Palliser Expedition of western British North America. By 1861, Dr. Hector named what is now known as Windsor Ridge today as Castle Mountain, renamed in 1979 in conjunction to the renaming of Mount Eisenhower in Banff National Park to Castle Mountain.

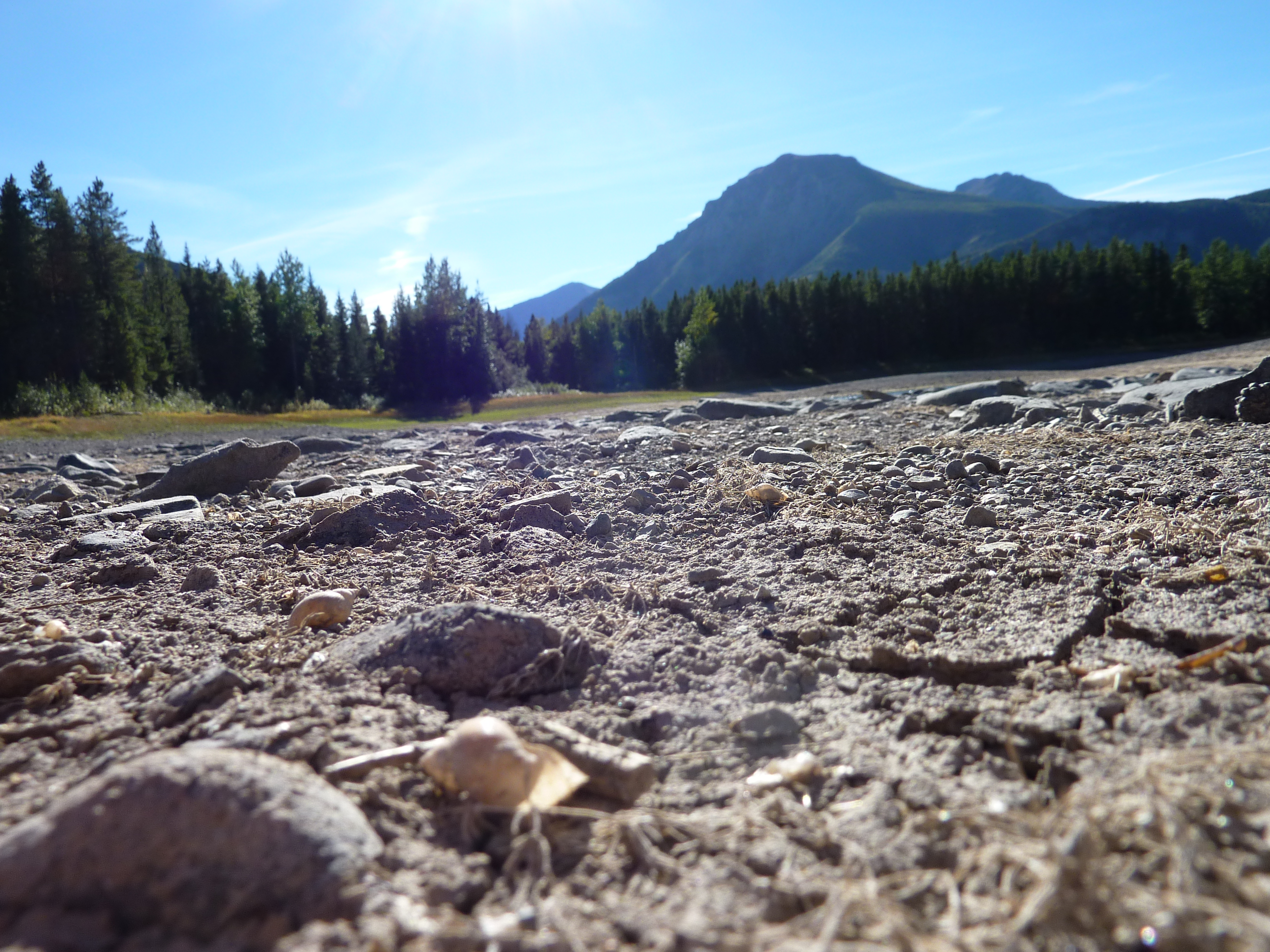
Syncline Cross Country Ski Area

=== Park formation ===
The Castle Provincial Park was first protected in 1908 under the Dominion Lands Acts as a part of the Rocky Mountain Forest Reserve which covered the Eastern Rocky Mountain Slopes north from the United States border. In 1914, the southern portion of the Castle Provincial Park was protected under Waterton Forest Park but by 1921, these protections were reduced to a federal Forest Reserve designation. This trend of protectionism and privatization continued until the Castle Provincial Park and Castle Wildland Provincial Park was announced under the N.D.P. Rachel Notley government in 2015. This announcement was formalized two years later in February 2017.

== Climate ==
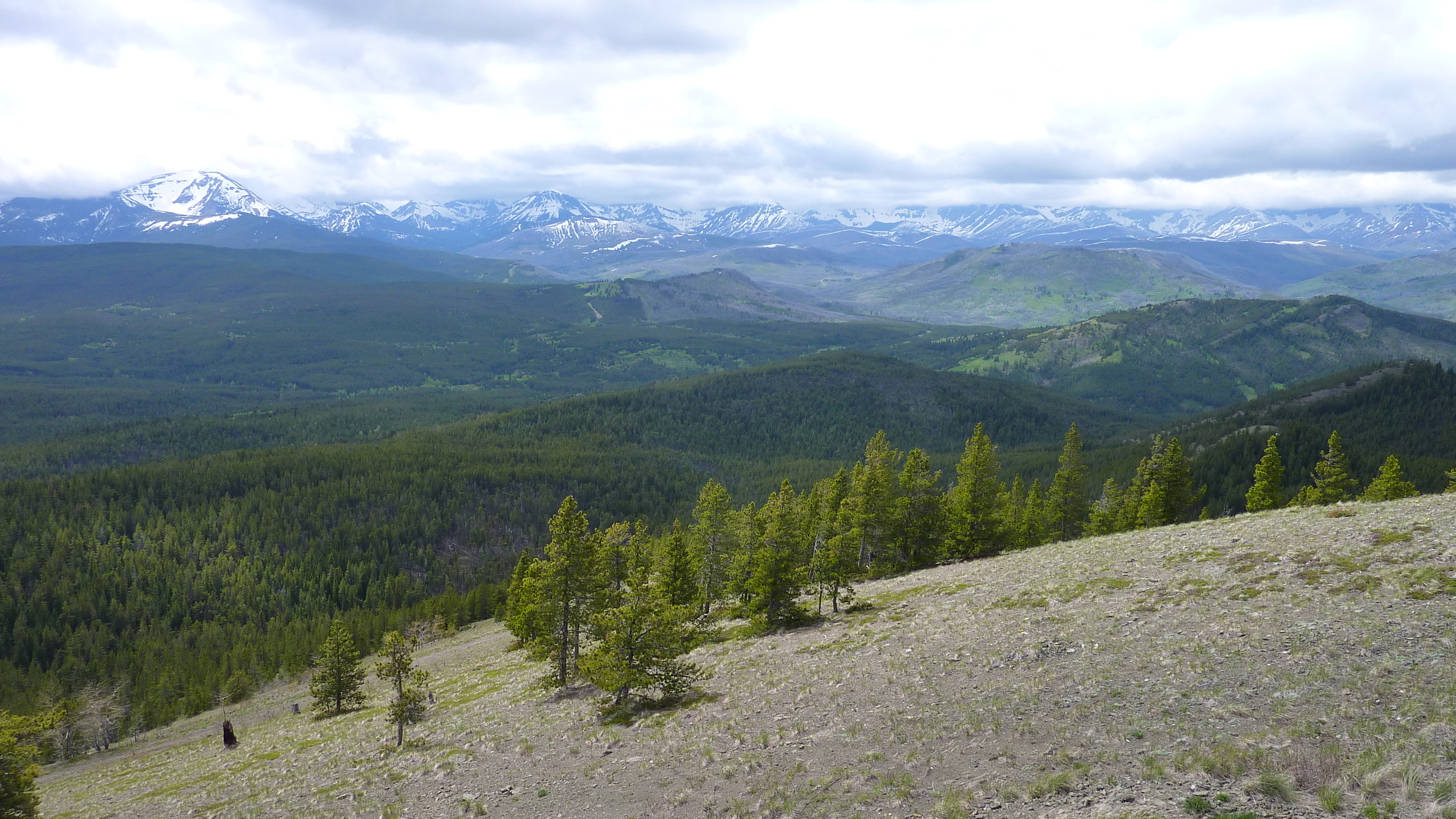
Castle Provincial Park

The Castle Provincial Park has a unique climate which has allowed the growth of many unique plant and animal species. This climate is formed because of the transition of subalpine forest to tundra, and is characterized by short summers interchanged with long, snowy winters. Precipitation varies throughout the park due to the interplay of the Pacific Maritime and Arctic Continental air masses. Factors of climate concern in the Castle Provincial Park include wind exposure, moisture patterns such as snow accumulation and availability, volcanic debris, topography, and seasonal temperature changes.

These climate forces can result in strong winds, Chinooks, and heavy snowfalls. Nearest temperature data from the Crowsnest Pass, north of the Castle Wildland Provincial Park, shows an average summer temperature of 11 to 16 degrees Celsius and average winter temperatures from −4 to 0 degrees Celsius, with 102 cm of average snowfall.

== Art in the Park ==
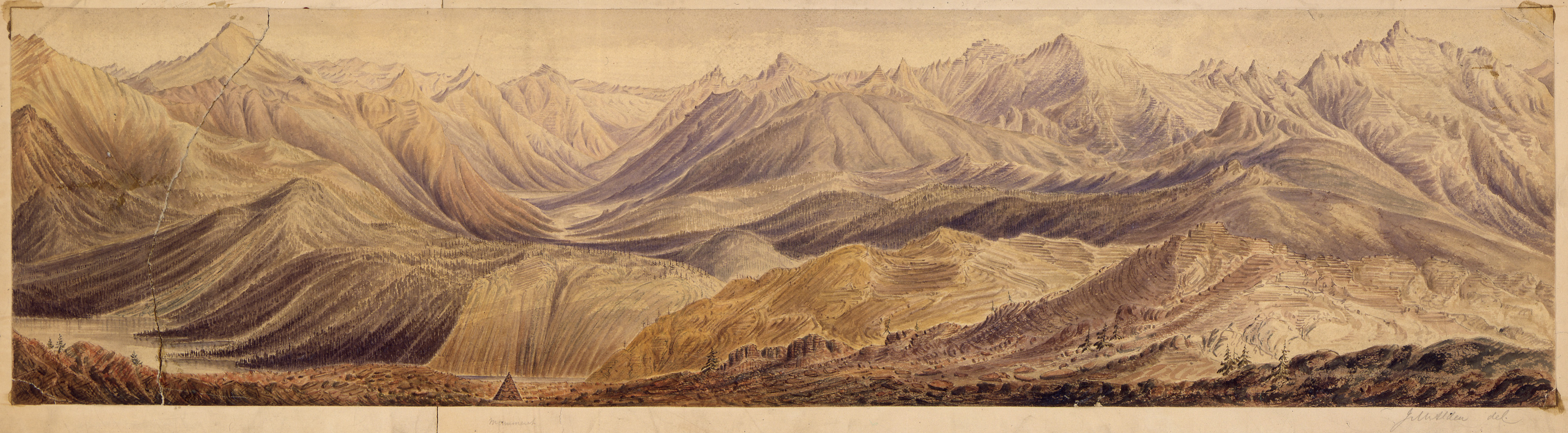
View from Summit Pass in Waterton Lakes National Park, painted by James Madison Alden, 1857–1862.

Due to its naturally stunning vistas, the Castle Provincial Park was recognized by nature preservationists. Naturalists first found this park to be a unique ecosystem a place to study as it is the habitat of many unique species such as the Whitebark Pine and Limber Pine, which are endangered trees protected under the Wildlife Act of the Ministry of Alberta's Environment and Sustainable Resources.

The first landscapes of the Waterton and surrounding areas were painted by military artists Charles Wilson and James Madison Alden. Because of the vantage points offered by the peaks in the Waterton Lakes National Park and Flathead Valley, portions of the Castle Provincial Park were featured in the background of Alden's paintings.
