= Andy Good Peak =

Mountain in the Canadian Rockies

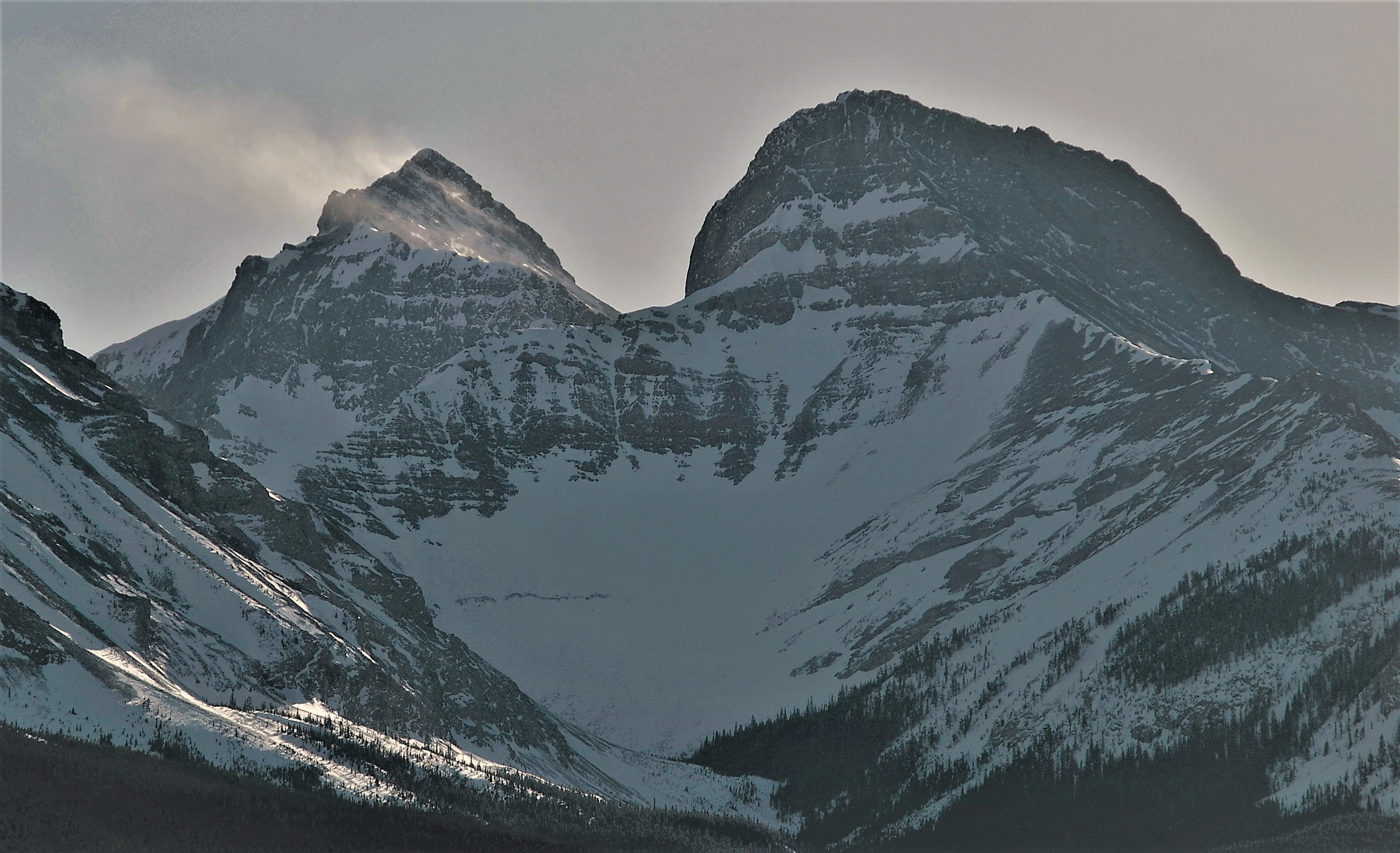
- Andy Good Peak left, Mount Parrish right

Highest point
- Elevation: 2,621 m (8,599 ft)
- Prominence: 257 m (843 ft)
- Parent peak: Mount Ptolemy
- Listing: Mountains of Alberta; Mountains of British Columbia
- Coordinates: 49°33′55″N 114°35′17″W

Geography
- Location within Alberta Location within British Columbia Location within Canada
- Country: Canada
- Provinces: Alberta and British Columbia
- District: Kootenay Land District
- Parent range: Flathead Range
- Topo map: NTS 82G10 Crowsnest

Andy Good Peak is located just south of Crowsnest Pass on the Canadian provincial boundary between Alberta and British Columbia on the Continental Divide. It was named in 1916 after Andy Good, a hotel owner in nearby Crowsnest Pass whose bar straddled the provincial border.

== Gallery ==
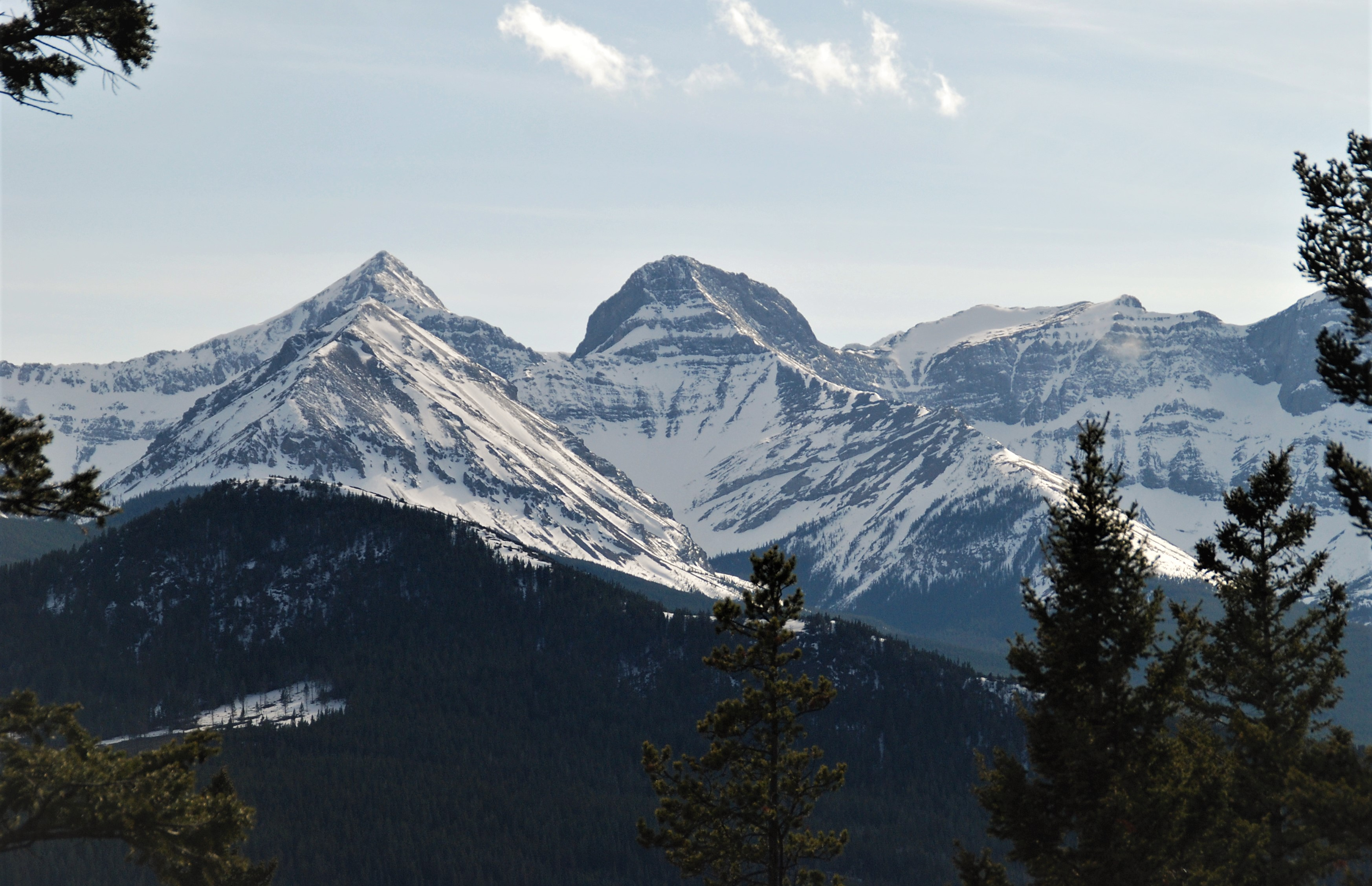
Mt. McLaren, with Andy Good Peak (behind), and Mt. Parrish (right)

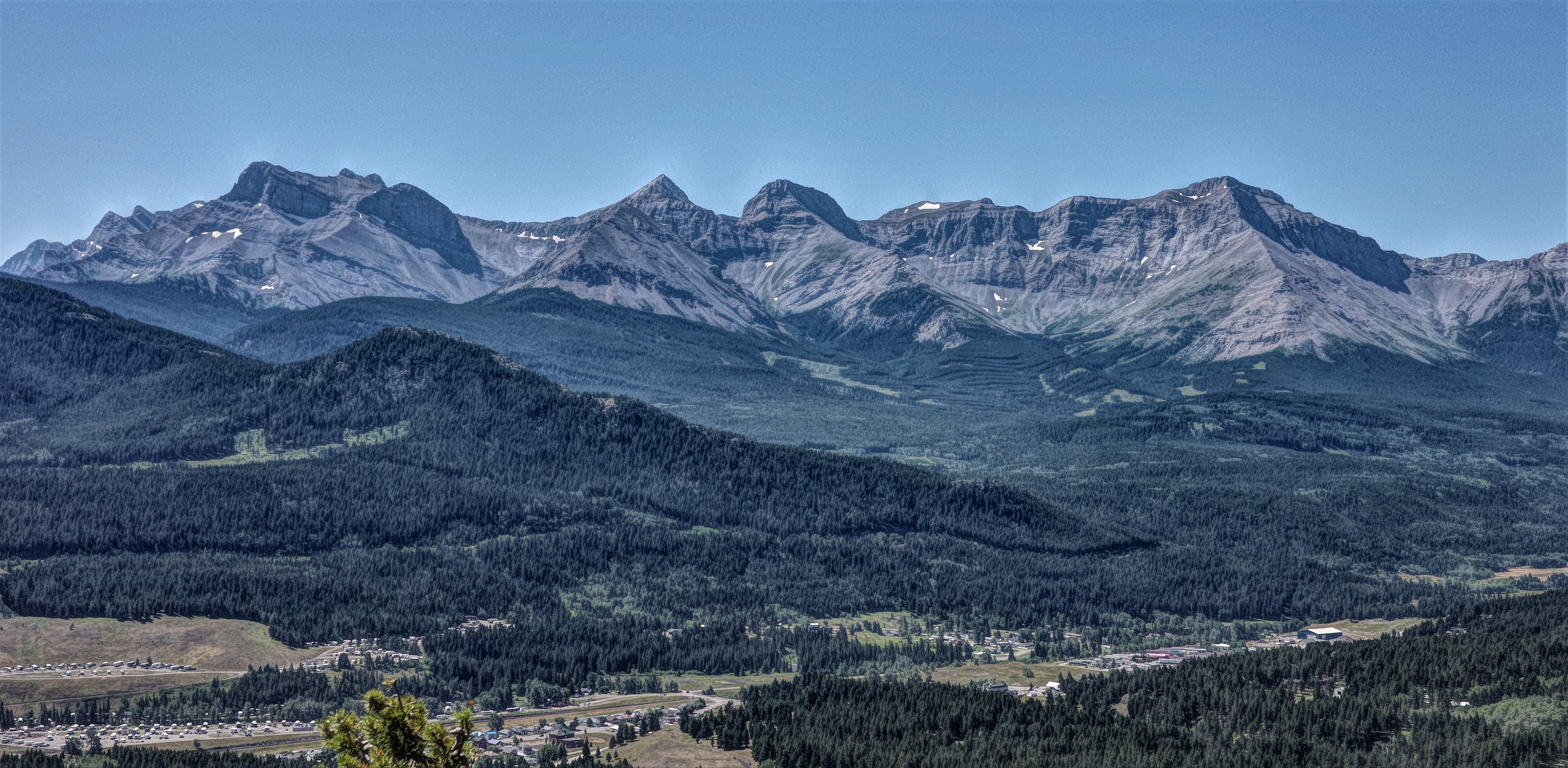
Flathead Range
Left to rightː Mount Coulthard, Andy Good Peak, Mount Parrish, Chinook Peak.

== See also ==
- List of peaks on the Alberta–British Columbia border
