= Mount McLaren =

Mountain in Alberta, Canada

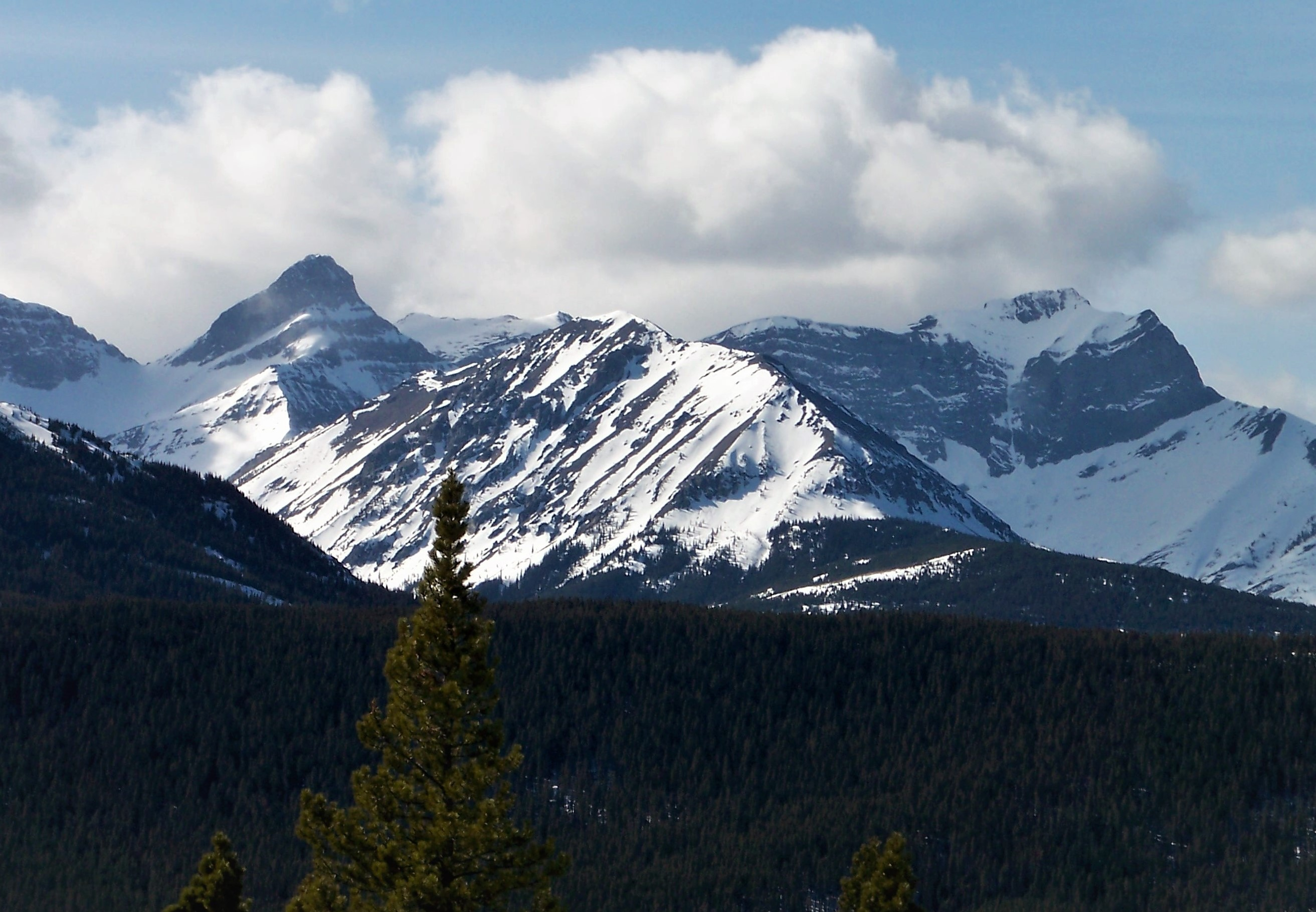
- Mount McLaren centered, from ENE (Mount Parrish left, Chinook Peak right)

Highest point
- Elevation: 2,301 m (7,549 ft)
- Prominence: 220 m (722 ft)
- Parent peak: Mount Ptolemy (2,813 m)
- Isolation: 1.38 km (0.86 mi)
- Listing: Mountains of Alberta
- Coordinates: 49°34′59″N 114°34′05″W

Naming
- Etymology: Peter McLaren

Geography
- Location within Alberta Location within Canada
- Interactive map of Mount McLaren
- Location: Castle Wildland Provincial Park; Alberta, Canada
- Parent range: Flathead Range; Canadian Rockies
- Topo map: NTS 82G10 Crowsnest

Geology
- Mountain type: Fault block
- Rock type: Limestone

Climbing
- Easiest route: Scrambling via SW Ridge

Mount McLaren is a 2,301-metre (7,549-foot) mountain summit located in Alberta, Canada.

== Description ==
Mount McLaren is situated six kilometers southwest of the town of Coleman in the Crowsnest Pass area and can be seen from the Crowsnest Highway (Highway 3). It is part of the Flathead Range which is a subset of the Canadian Rockies. The peak is set two kilometers east of the Continental Divide, in Castle Wildland Provincial Park. Precipitation runoff from the mountain drains into Star and North York creeks which are tributaries of the nearby Crowsnest River. Topographic relief is significant as the summit rises over 945 metres (3,100 ft) above the river in 5 km (3.1 mi). Chinook Peak is 3.0 km (1.9 mi) to the west of Mt. McLaren and the nearest higher neighbor is Mount Parrish, 1.4 km (0.87 mi) to the southwest.

== History ==
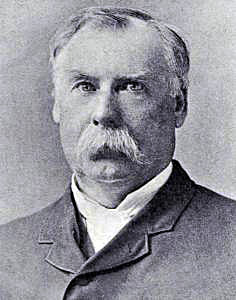
Peter McLaren (1906)

Mount McLaren is named after Peter McLaren (1833–1919), a Canadian politician and Senator from Perth, Ontario. Senator Peter McLaren was involved in the timber trade and operated a sawmill on Mill Creek (west of Pincher Creek) which provided railroad ties for the construction of the Crowsnest Pass Railway in 1897 and 1898. His loggers hewed the trees ahead of track layers. The mountain's toponym was officially adopted March 15, 1962, by the Geographical Names Board of Canada.

On January 19, 1946, a Royal Canadian Air Force DC-3 struck Mount Ptolemy and crashed into the North York Creek valley below Mount McLaren. All seven crewmembers perished in the accident. Some wreckage of the aircraft is still present.

== Geology ==
Mount McLaren is composed of limestone which is a sedimentary rock laid down during the Precambrian to Jurassic periods. Formed in shallow seas, this sedimentary rock was pushed east and over the top of younger Cretaceous period rock during the Laramide orogeny.

== Climate ==
Based on the Köppen climate classification, Mount McLaren has an alpine subarctic climate with cold, snowy winters, and mild summers. Temperatures can drop below −20 °C with wind chill factors below −30 °C.

== Gallery ==
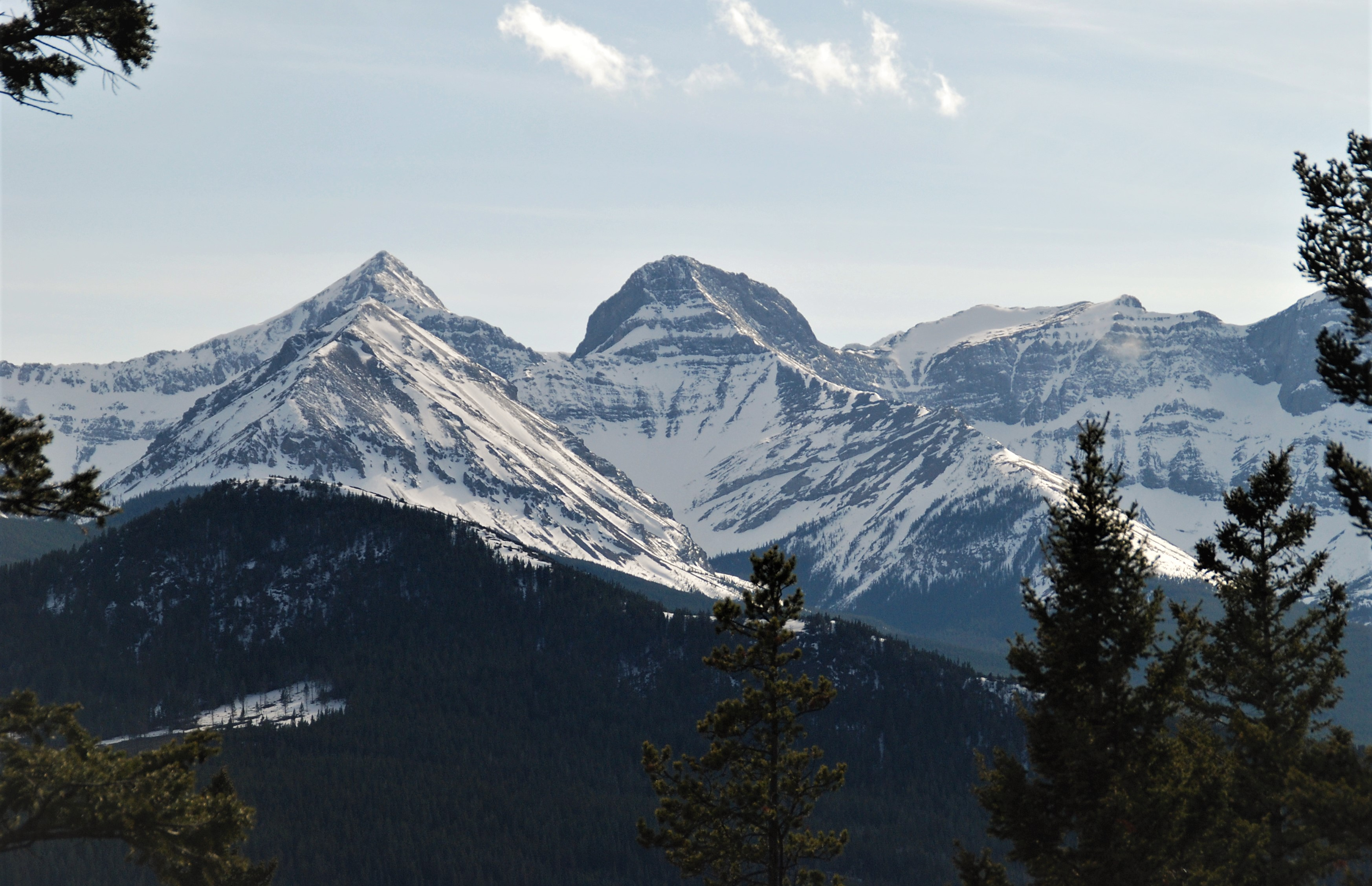
Mt. McLaren, with Andy Good Peak (behind), and Mt. Parrish (center)

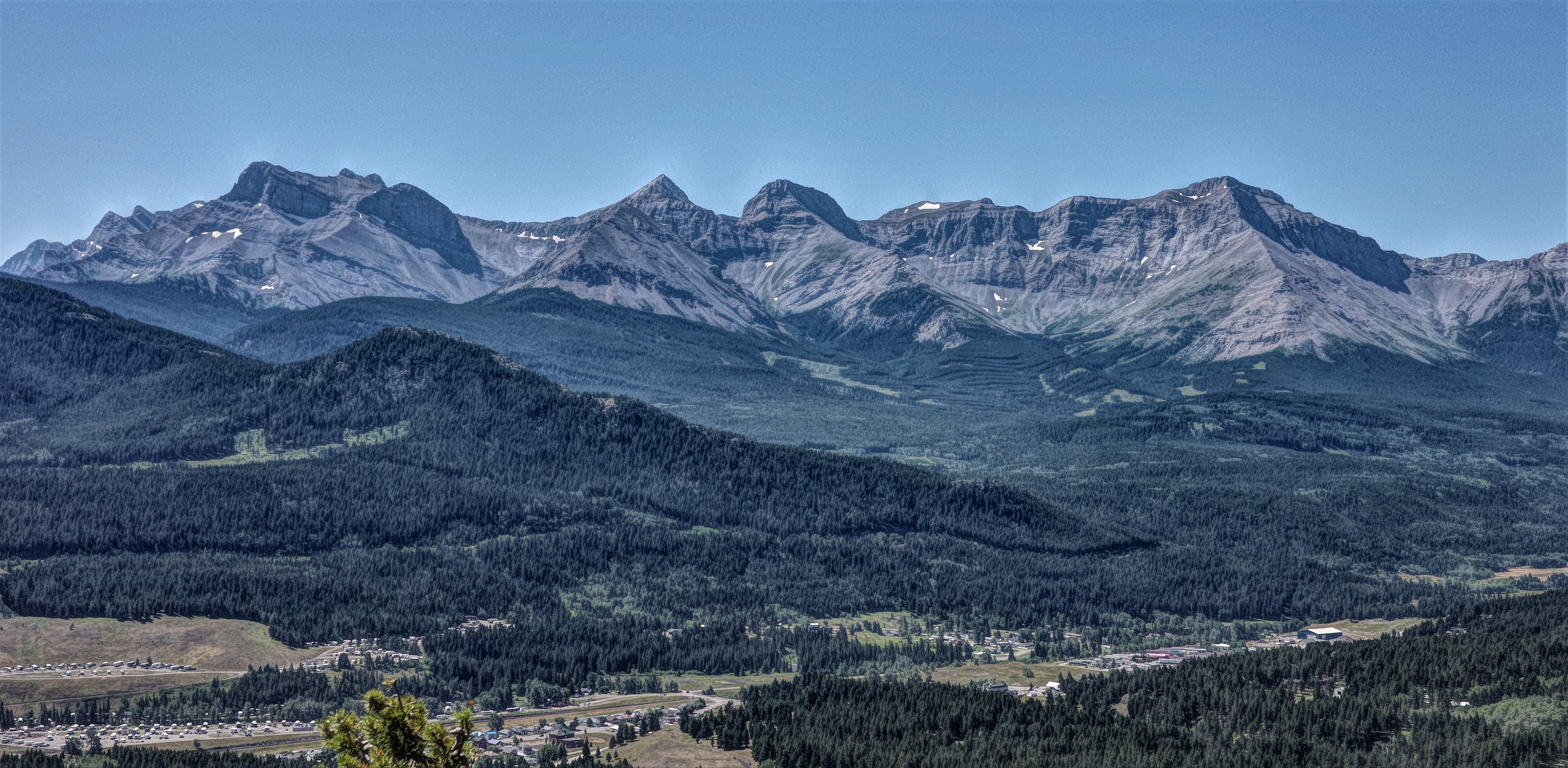
Flathead Range
L→Rː Mt. Coulthard, Mt. McLaren, Andy Good Peak, Mt. Parrish, Chinook Peak

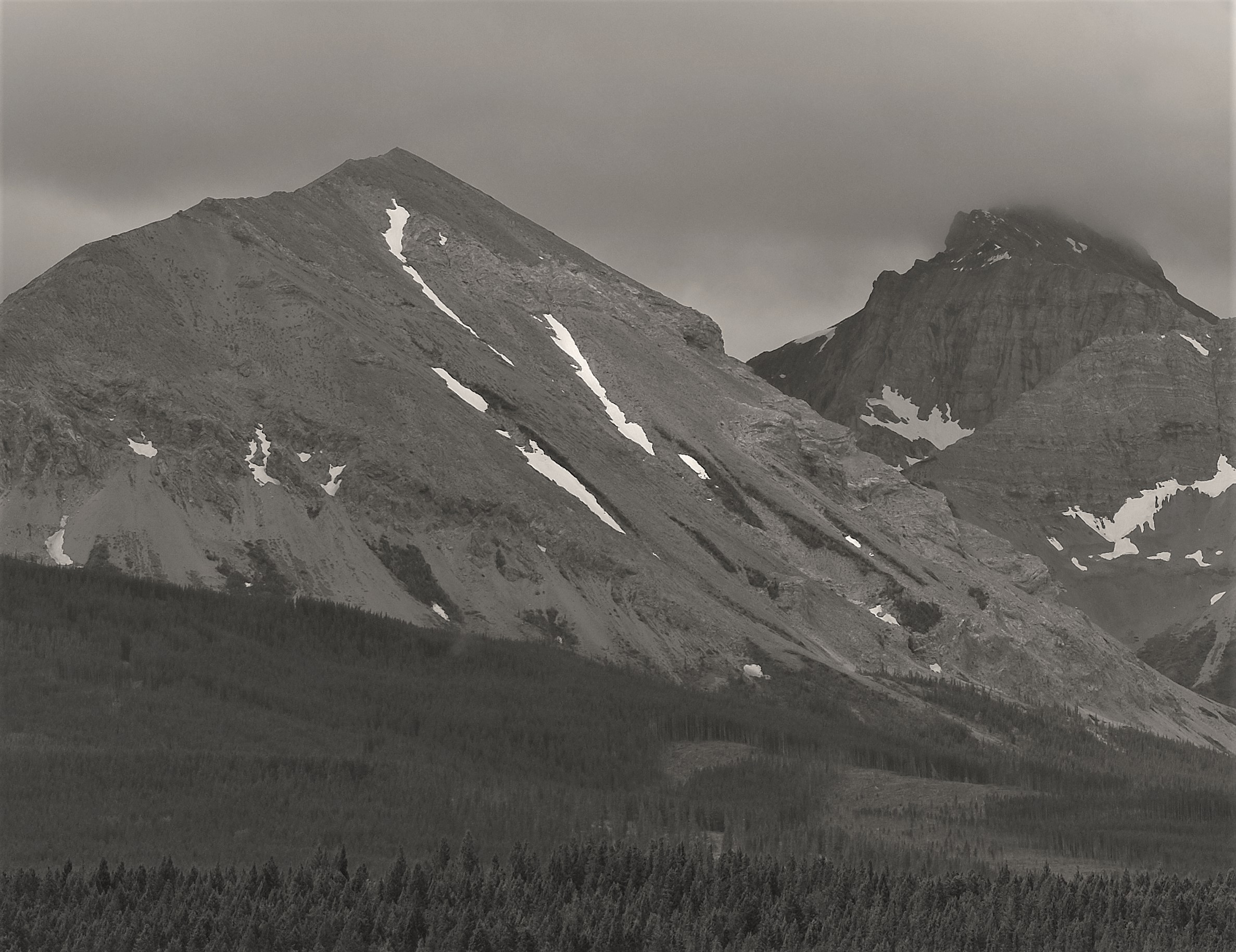
Mt. McLaren to left

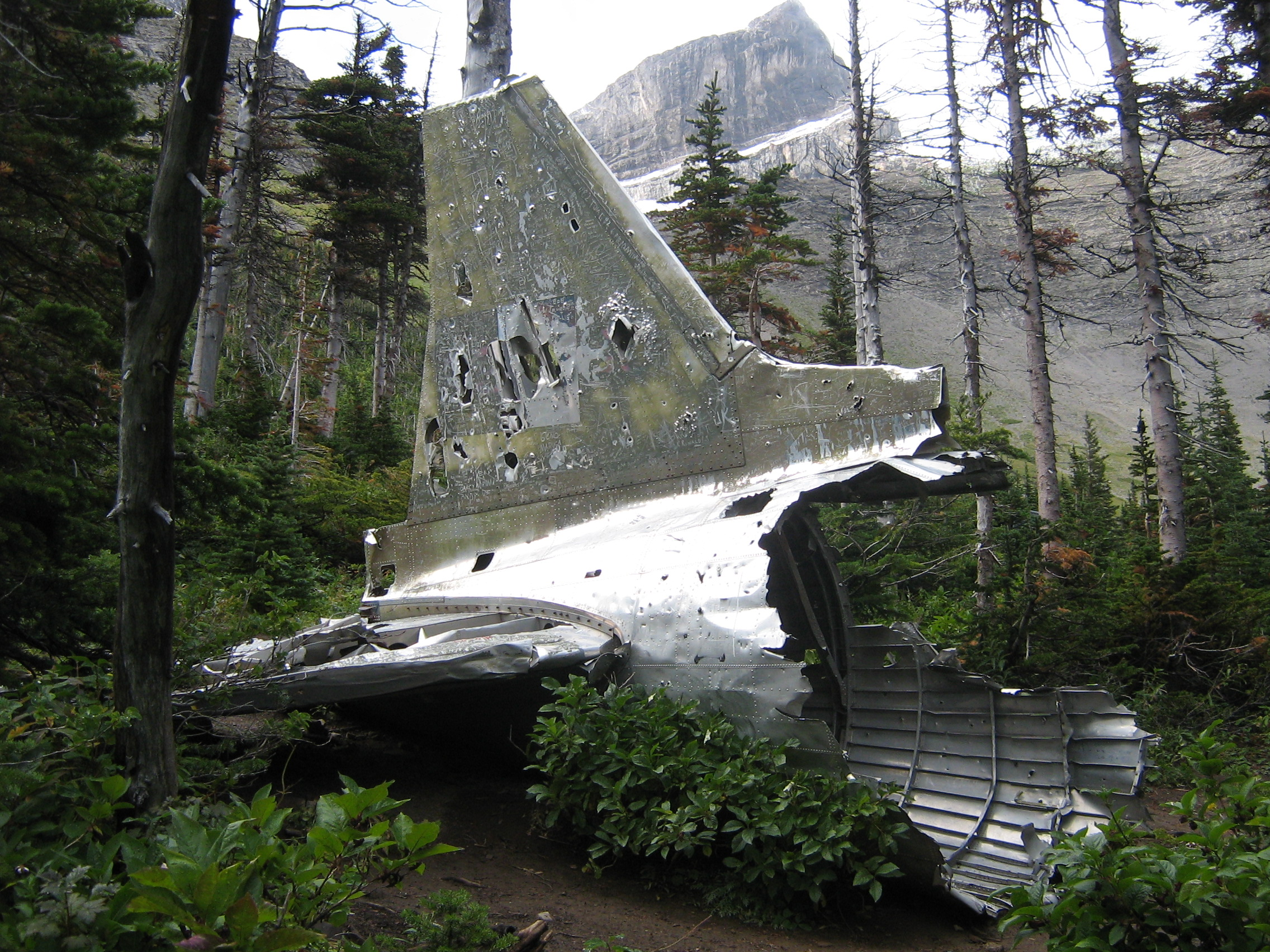
DC-3 wreckage near Mt. McLaren

== See also ==
- Geology of Alberta
- Geography of Alberta
