= Chinook Peak (Alberta) =

Mountain in Alberta, Canada

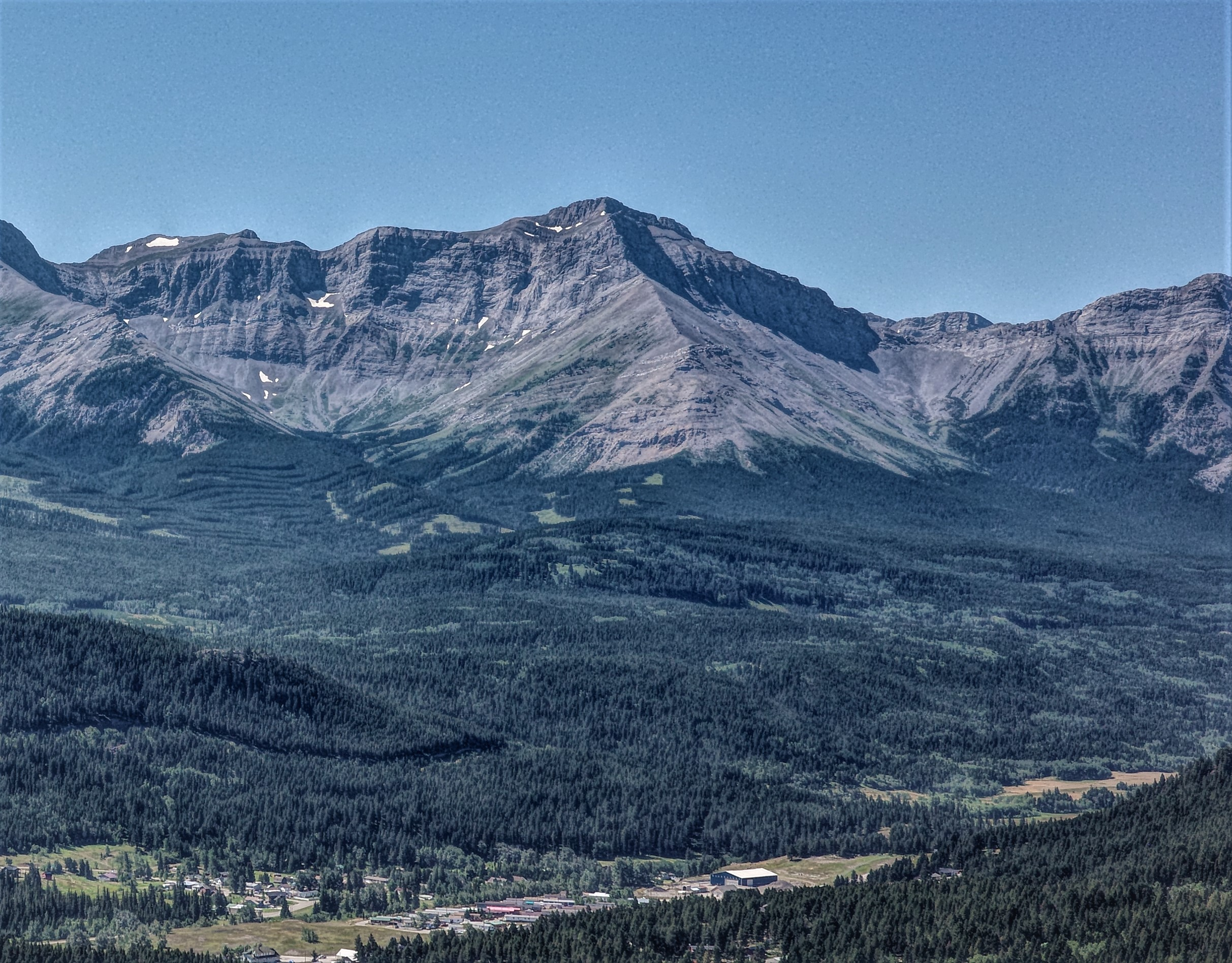
- Chinook Peak, northeast aspect

Highest point
- Elevation: 2,591 m (8,501 ft)
- Prominence: 246 m (807 ft)
- Parent peak: Andy Good Peak (2,621 m)
- Listing: Mountains of Alberta
- Coordinates: 49°35′08″N 114°36′36″W

Naming
- Etymology: Chinook wind

Geography
- Location within Alberta Location within Canada
- Interactive map of Chinook Peak
- Location: Castle Wildland Provincial Park; Alberta, Canada
- Parent range: Flathead Range; Canadian Rockies
- Topo map: NTS 82G10 Crowsnest

Geology
- Mountain type: Fault block
- Rock type: Limestone

Climbing
- Easiest route: Scrambling

Chinook Peak is a 2,591-metre (8,501-foot) mountain summit located in the Canadian Rockies of Alberta, Canada.

== Description ==
Chinook Peak is situated 10 kilometers southwest of the town of Coleman in the Crowsnest Pass area and can be seen from Highway 3, the Crowsnest Highway. It is set on land managed by Castle Wildland Provincial Park. Precipitation runoff from the mountain drains into tributaries of the nearby Crowsnest River. Topographic relief is significant as the summit rises 1,300 meters (4,265 feet) above the river in 4.5 kilometers (2.8 miles). Sentry Mountain is 4.0 km (2.5 mi) to the northwest and the nearest higher neighbor is Andy Good Peak, 3.0 km (1.9 mi) to the southeast on the Continental Divide.

== History ==
Chinook Peak was named by Jim Kerr, a resident of the Crowsnest Pass. Jim knew that when snow started blowing from the top from the west, a chinook wind would soon follow. When mapping this area, Dr. Raymond A. Price of the Geological Survey of Canada mapping this area, used this name to identify the peak. The mountain's toponym was officially adopted in 1962 by the Geographical Names Board of Canada.

== Geology ==
Chinook Peak is composed of sedimentary rock laid down during the Precambrian to Jurassic periods. Formed in shallow seas, this sedimentary rock was pushed east and over the top of younger Cretaceous period rock during the Laramide orogeny.

== Climate ==
Based on the Köppen climate classification, Chinook Peak has an alpine subarctic climate with cold, snowy winters, and mild summers. Temperatures can drop below −20 °C with wind chill factors below −30 °C.

== Gallery ==
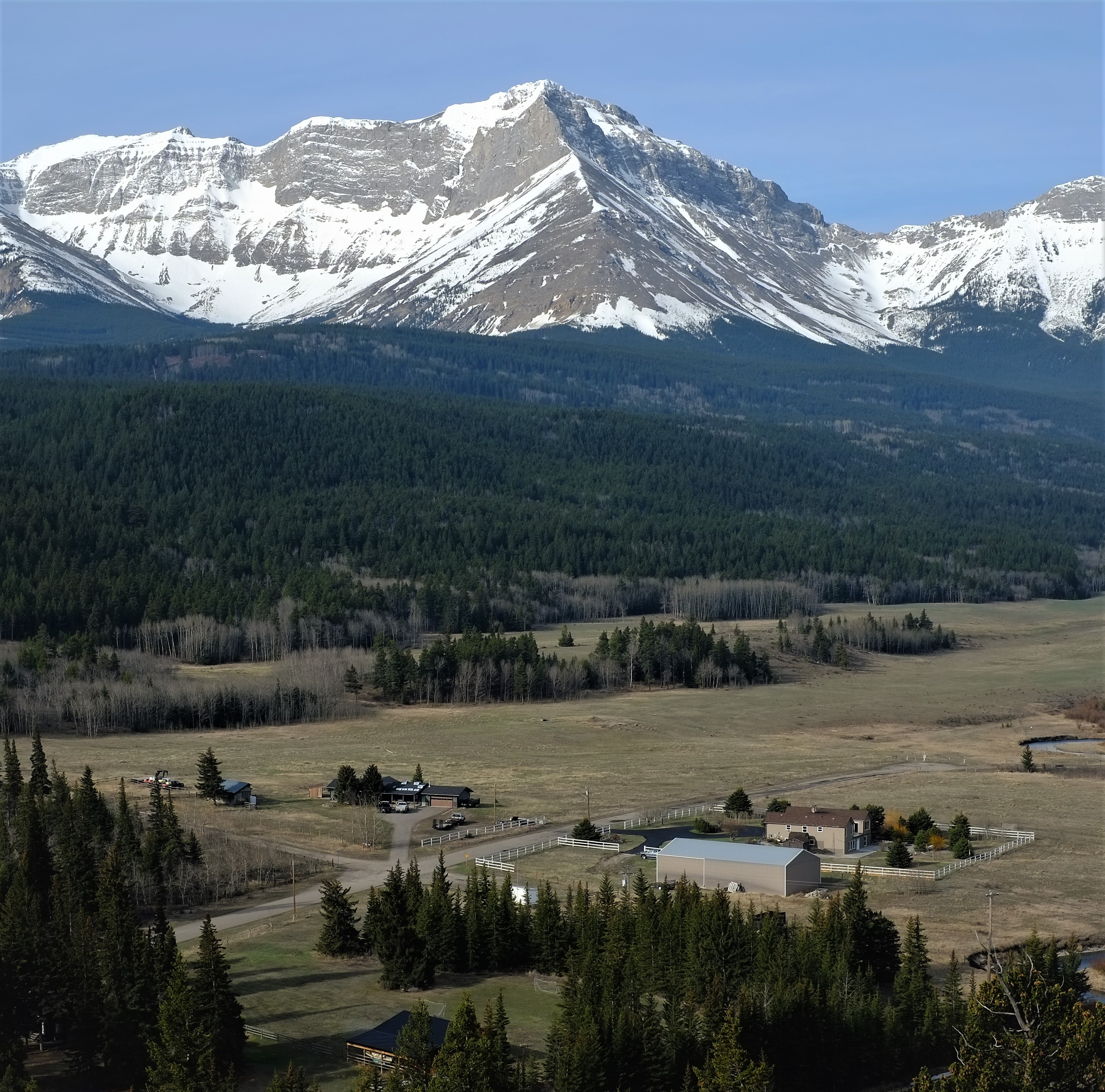
Northeast aspect

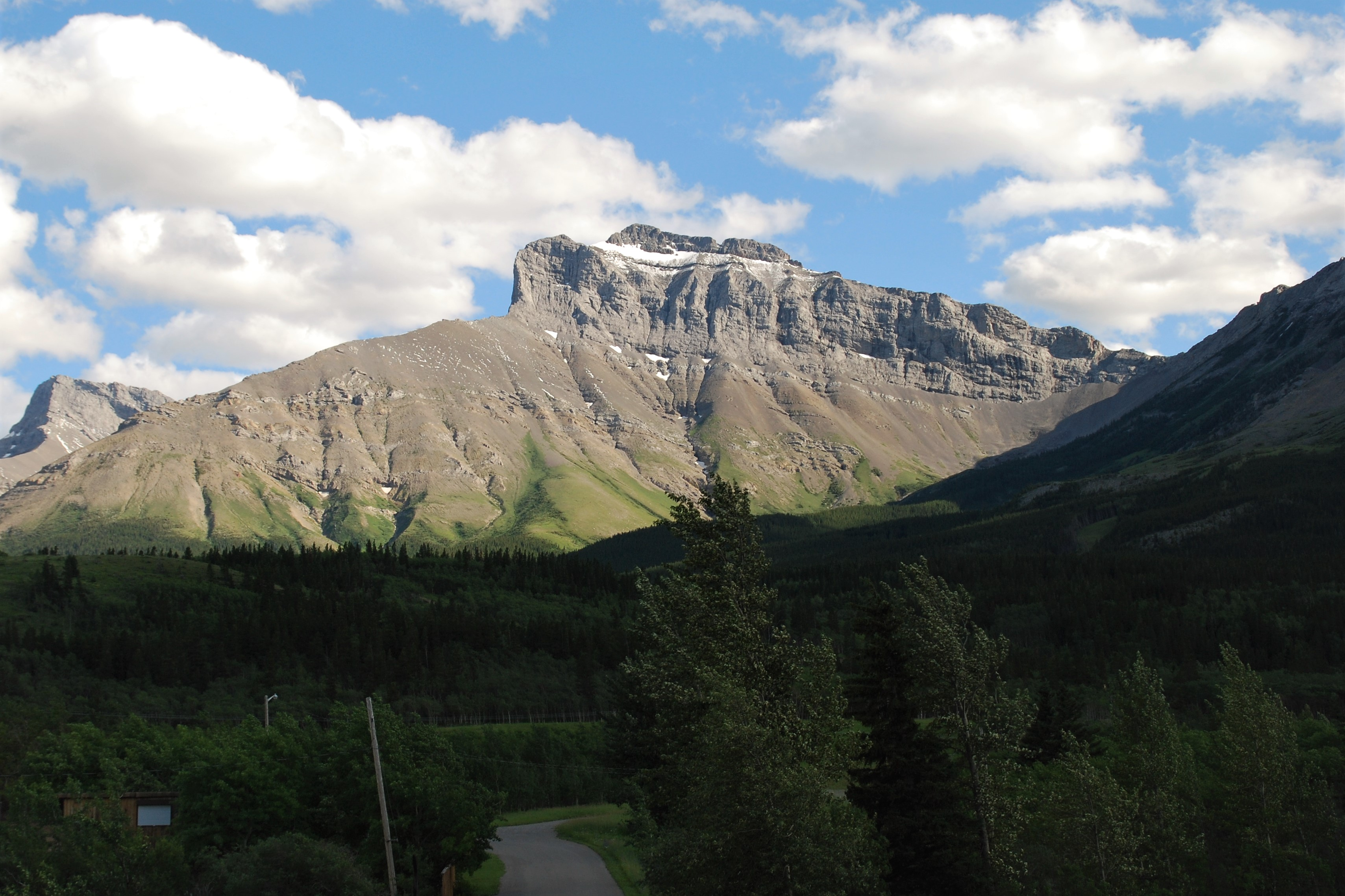
North aspect

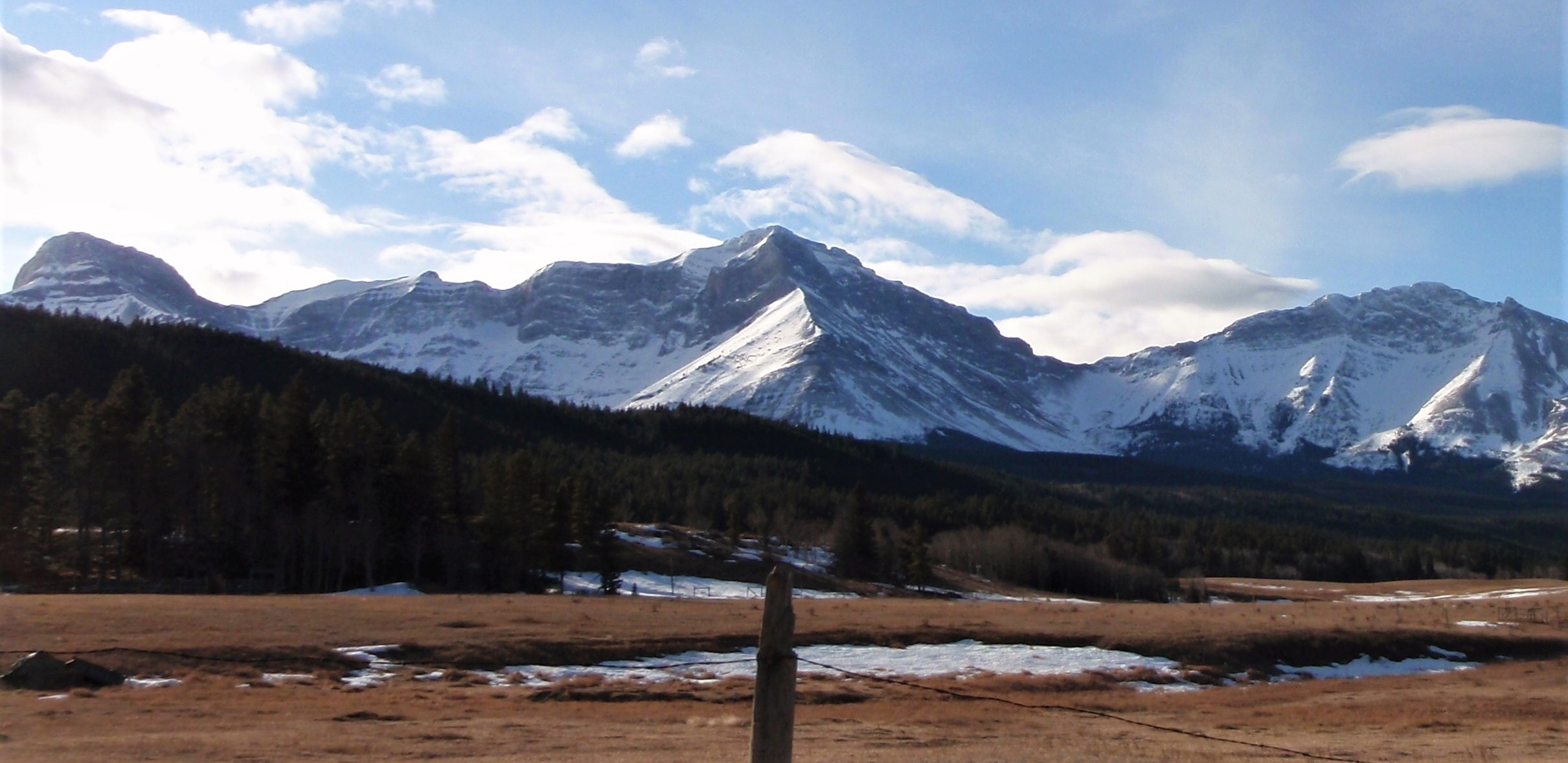
Chinook Peak in winter

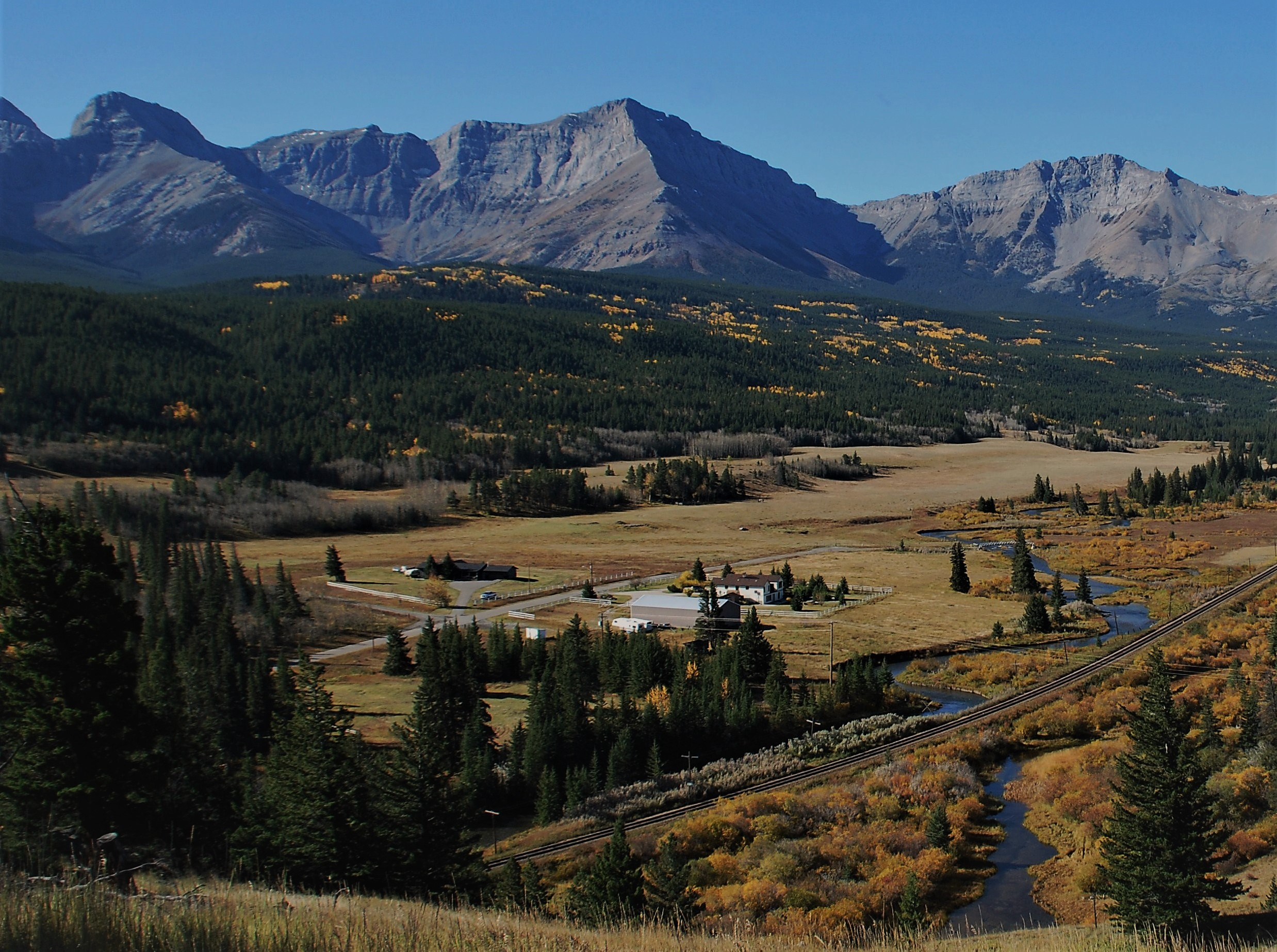
Chinook Peak centered at top

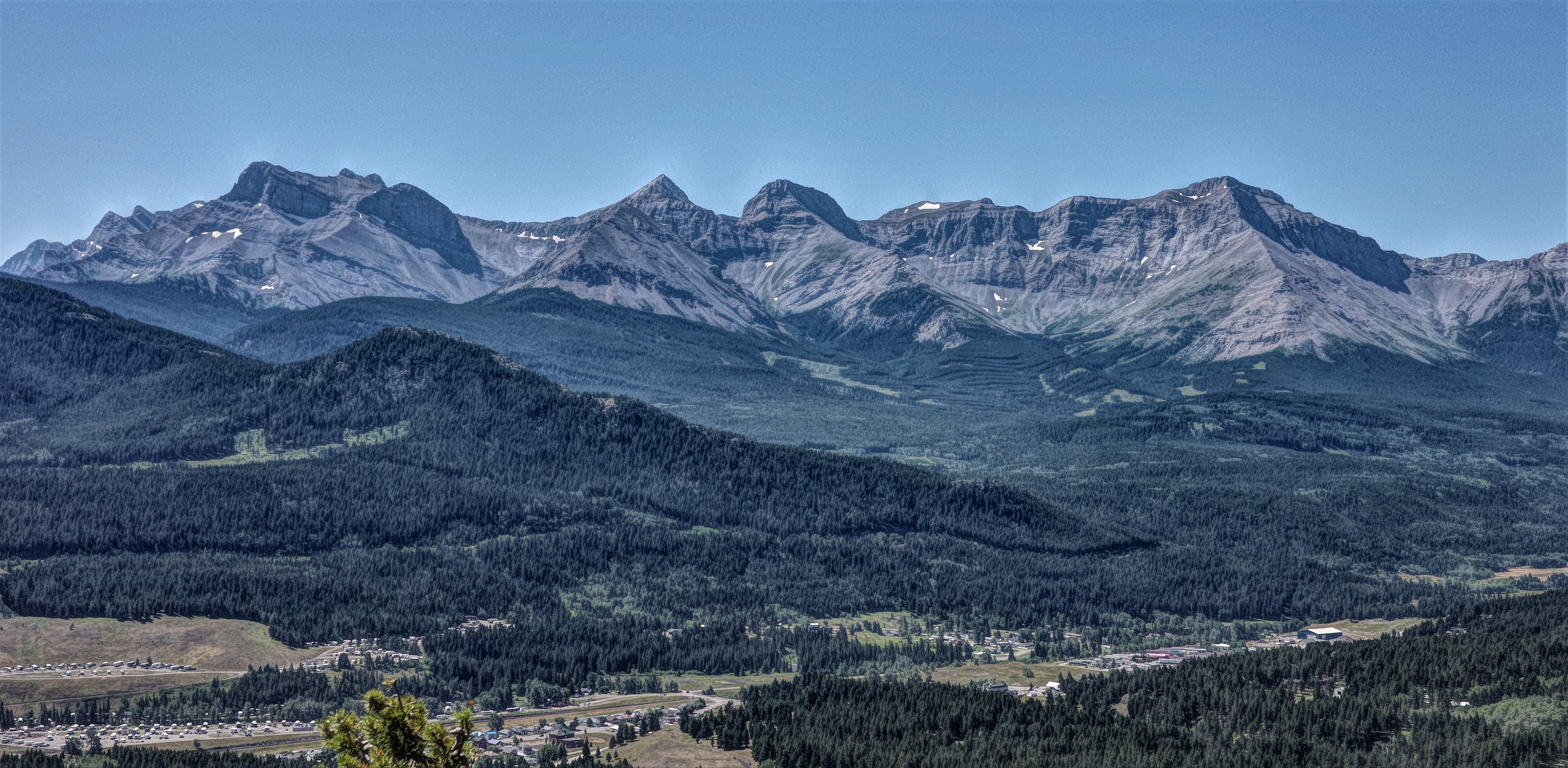
Flathead Range
Left to rightː Mount Coulthard, Andy Good Peak, Mount Parrish, Chinook Peak.

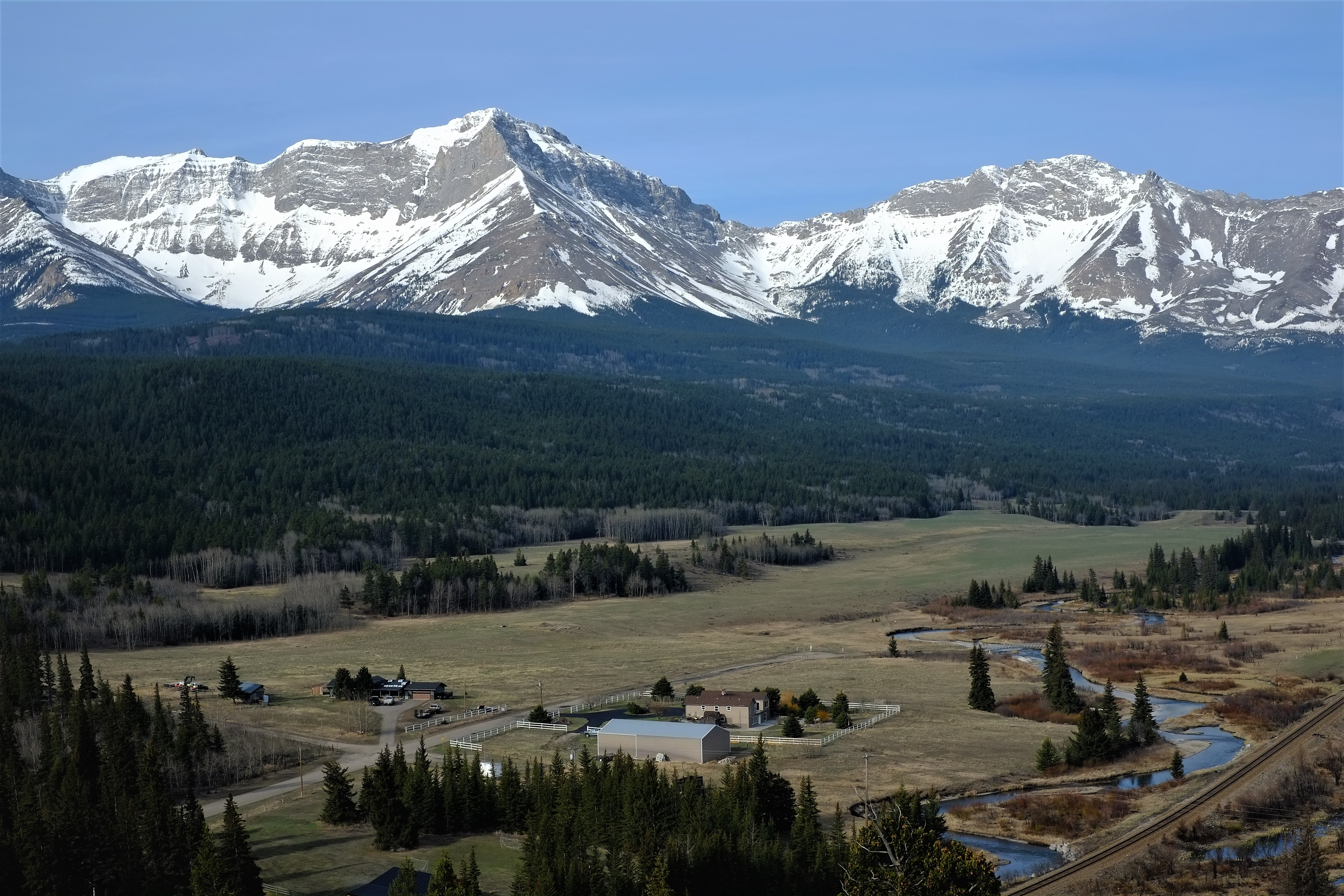
Chinook Peak (left)

== See also ==
- Geology of Alberta
