= Castle Wildland Provincial Park =

Provincial park in Alberta, Canada

- IUCN category Ib (wilderness area)
- Location within Alberta Location within Canada Location within M.D. of Pincher Creek
- Interactive map of Castle Wildland Provincial Park
- Location: Alberta Canada
- Nearest city: Crowsnest Pass, Pincher Creek
- Coordinates: 49°15′N 114°15′W
- Area: 79,678 ha (307.64 sq mi)
- Established: 16 February 2017
- Governing body: Alberta Parks

Castle Wildland Provincial Park is a wildland provincial park in southern Alberta, Canada. The designation of the park was established on 20 January 2017, with an effective date of 16 February 2017. The designation involved the protection of 79,678 hectares (196,890 acres) of land. The park is included in the South Saskatchewan Region Land Use Framework. The park, along with Castle Provincial Park, is managed under the Castle Management Plan. The park takes its name from the region including the Castle River and Castle Peak of Windsor Mountain. Despite the name, it is not associated with Castle Mountain which is in Banff National Park.

== Location ==
The park is located within the Municipal District of Pincher Creek west of the town of Pincher Creek. It shares a northern boundary with the Municipality of Crowsnest Pass, a southwestern boundary with the province of British Columbia, a southeastern boundary with Waterton Lakes National Park and a northeastern boundary with Castle Provincial Park.

== History ==
The Castle area has a long history of traditional, recreational, and commercial activity. First Nations groups have made practical and ceremonial use of the area long before the European settlement of Canada. Nations such as "Blackfoot, Piegan, and Blood tribes have long hunted, fished, and gathered foods and medicinal plants throughout [the] territory".

In 1895, the area was included in the newly created Waterton Dominion Park. In 1921, the area was removed from the Dominion Park and transferred to the Alberta Government to become a Provincial Game Reserve. In 1954, the Provincial Game Reserve status was removed. Logging, mining, and oil and gas extraction were conducted resulting in a network of roads spread through the area. In 1974, the Alberta Government recommended a park be established in the headwaters of the Castle River. The government intended to place the West and South Castle watersheds into a protected area. In 1977, the Eastern Slopes Policy created areas of "Prime Protection, Critical Wildlife, and General Recreation in the Castle area".

In 1992, an Access Management Plan was developed to address the increased use of off-highway vehicles in the Castle River area. In 1993, the Special Places 2000 Committee recommended the sites identified for protection, including the Castle area, be established by the end of 1994. In September 2014, the South Saskatchewan Regional Plan was adopted which included the plans for establishment of Castle Provincial and Wildland Parks.

== Ecology ==
The park's natural history themes are in the Alpine, Subalpine, and Montane subregions of the Rocky Mountain region in the Alberta classification system. In the National Ecological Framework for Canada used by Environment and Climate Change Canada, the park is in the Crowsnest Mountains, Blairmore Foothills, and Waterton Mountains ecodistricts of the Northern Continental Divide ecoregion in the Columbia Montane Cordillera ecoprovince of the Montane Cordillera ecozone. Under the OneEarth classification (previously World Wildlife Fund), the park is in the Northern Rockies conifer forests ecoregion of the Greater Rockies & Mountain Forests bioregion.

=== Geology ===
The park is located within the front ranges of the southern Rocky Mountains of Alberta. The Rocky Mountains were formed by the collision of tectonic plates. Successive ice ages and retreating glaciers carved the mountains to form the river valleys. The result of these geological events is the landscape of the park, "characterized by mountain peaks, numerous streams, and forests". The oldest sediments in North America are found in the southwestern corner of the Castle area and are dated to the Precambrian and contain stromatolites; some of the oldest known fossils on earth.

=== Climate ===

The Köppen climate classification of the park is Continental, Subarctic (Dfc) characterized by long, cold, dry winters, and short, cool, summers. Using the data from nearby weather station, Castle Auto, for 1991 to 2020, the average daily temperatures exceeds 10 °C (50 °F) only for June, July, August, and September while average daily temperatures are less than 0 °C (32 °F) for November through March. At Castle Auto station, the long-run average precipitation from 1991 to 2020 is variable throughout the year from 40 to 100 mm (1.6 to 3.9 in) per month.

== Activities ==
Front country and back country hiking are available in the park. There are no developed facilities so only back country camping is available. Hunting is permitted with proper authorization and licensing. An extensive trail network in the combined Castle Provincial and Wildland Parks enable hiking, mountain bike riding, all-terrain vehicle, snowmobiles, and equestrian trail riding.
