= List of peaks on the Alberta–British Columbia border =

This is a list of peaks on the Alberta–British Columbia border, being the spine of the Continental Divide from the Canada–United States border to the 120th meridian, which is where the boundary departs from the Continental Divide and goes due north to the 60th parallel. Peaks are listed from north to south and include the four peaks not on the Continental Divide but which are on the 120th Meridian, stretching approximately 60 kilometres (37 mi) due north from Intersection Mountain, which as its name implies is located at the intersection of the Divide and the Meridian.

Name	Alternate name(s)	Elevation (m)	Coordinates	Location/range	Parks	BCGNIS	CGNDB	Other sites	Comments
Dinosaur Ridge		1691	54°20′00″N 120°00′00″W	S side Narraway River					name was inspired by profile of the ridge; on the 120th Meridian, not on the Continental Divide
Mount Gorman		2380	54°11′00″N 120°00′00″W						on the 120th Meridian, not on the Continental Divide
Kakwa Mountain		2295	54°04′35″N 120°00′00″W	Jarvis Pass	Kakwa-Willmore				on the 120th Meridian, not on the Continental Divide
Mount Côté	Mount Arthur	2391	53°53′00″N 120°00′00″W						on the 120th Meridian, not on the Continental Divide
Intersection Mountain		2461	53°48′00″N 120°00′00″W						apparently named for its location at the intersection of the Continental Divide and the 120th Meridian
Mount Morkill		2267	53°41′42″N 119°50′27″W						
Mount Forget	Detail Mountain	2122	53°39′49″N 119°44′23″W	Morkill Pass					named after the Hon. Amédée Emmanuel Forget (1847–1923), of Banff; last Lieutenant Governor of the North West Territories 1898–1905; first Lieutenant Governor of Saskatchewan, 1905–1910; senator 1911–1923
Mount Talbot		2372	53°36′57″N 119°43′01″W	Shale Pass					
Interpass Ridge		2301	53°36′39″N 119°56′27″W	Avalanche Pass/Beaverdam Pass					named is derived from location between Beaverdam Pass (SE) and Avalanche Pass (E)
Big Shale Hill	Great Shale Hill	2405	53°35′24″N 119°46′22″W	Shale Pass/Morkill Pass					
Mount Pauline		2650	53°32′06″N 119°53′56″W	Beaverdam Pass					
Perseverance Mountain		2434	53°27′30″N 119°45′20″W						
Jackpine Mountain		2555	53°22′16″N 119°33′46″W	Jackpine Pass/Holmes-Jackpine Rivers					
Mount Bess		3203	53°20′55″N 119°22′38″W	Bess Pass					
Whiteshield Mountain		2555	53°18′19″N 119°21′16″W		Mount Robson				
Treadmill Ridge			53°12′22″N 118°53′24″W						
Mumm Peak		2964	53°11′28″N 119°08′52″W	Berg Lake	Mount Robson/Jasper				
Upright Mountain		2978	53°11′16″N 118°51′42″W		Mount Robson				"upright" because the strata of the mountain have been tilted nearly upright
Mount Phillips	Resolution Mountain	3246	53°10′37″N 119°15′39″W						
Tatei Ridge			53°09′39″N 119°04′46″W		Mount Robson				"Tatei" means "wind" (language not stated in source)
Titkana Peak		2827	53°09′20″N 119°03′59″W						"Titkana" means "bird" in the Stoney (Nakoda) language
Chushina Ridge			53°08′08″N 119°02′54″W		Mount Robson				"Chushina" means "small" in the Stoney (Nakoda) language
Lynx Mountain		3192	53°07′32″N 119°02′53″W	Mount Robson					
Mount Machray			53°02′51″N 118°46′39″W		Mount Robson				Named after Robert Machray, DD, (1831–1904), first Anglican Bishop of Rupert's Land
Salient Mountain			53°02′47″N 118°42′12″W	Miette Pass	Mount Robson				
Mount McCord			53°02′35″N 118°40′03″W	Miette Pass	Mount Robson				named for the head surveyor in this area of the CPR Survey of 1872
Razorback Mountain			52°58′14″N 118°40′23″W	Yellowhead Pass	Mount Robson				
Caledonia Mountain			52°57′05″N 118°39′08″W	Yellowhead Pass	Mount Robson				Caledonia Valley is an old name for the Yellowhead Pass, and signifies the route used by fur traders to get to the New Caledonia fur district in north-central BC
Mount O'Beirne			52°54′49″N 118°37′17″W						
Tête Roche			52°54′03″N 118°33′46″W						name suggested by Tête Jaune ("yellow head"), nickname of the trapper for whom Yellowhead Pass is named (apparently François Decoigne, who was in charge of Jasper House in 1814)
Lucerne Peak		2412	52°53′04″N 118°35′03″W						named because of the vicinity's resemblance to Lucerne, Switzerland
Bingley Peak	Bingley Mountain		52°52′55″N 118°37′28″W						
Leather Peak			52°52′52″N 118°36′57″W	Yellowhead Pass	Mount Robson				derived from Leatherhead Pass, one of several alternate/historical names for the Yellowhead Pass
Yellowhead Mountain	Seven Sisters	2488	52°52′52″N 118°36′56″W	Yellowhead Pass					
Miette Hill			52°50′51″N 118°23′02″W	Yellowhead Pass	Mount Robson				
Kataka Mountain			52°49′55″N 118°23′50″W		Mount Robson				"kataka" means "fort" (language not specified)
Mount Clairvaux	Clairvaux Mountain		52°48′21″N 118°25′09″W						named in the sense of "clear valley", i.e. the Yellowhead Pass (not for Clairvaux, France)
Vista Peak			52°45′56″N 118°24′15″W		Mount Robson				
Caniche Peak			52°45′14″N 118°22′16″W		Mount Robson				"caniche" is French for "poodle"; the peaks resemblance to a poodle prompted the suggestion "Poodle Peak" but the name Caniche was chosen to give it "more class"
Tonquin Hill			52°44′16″N 118°19′40″W	Tonquin Pass	Mount Robson				as with Tonquin Valley, Tonquin Pass, Tonquin Creek, apparently named for the ill-fated fur trade ship the Tonquin
Bastion Peak			52°42′32″N 118°20′41″W		Mount Robson				
Drawbridge Peak			52°42′13″N 118°19′34″W		Mount Robson				
Redoubt Peak			52°41′22″N 118°17′57″W		Mount Robson				"redoubt" as in a small fortification/emplacmeent
Dungeon Peak			52°41′06″N 118°17′44″W		Mount Robson				
Mount Fraser		3313	52°41′06″N 118°17′44″W		Mount Robson				named after explorer Simon Fraser
Paragon Peak			52°40′29″N 118°17′19″W		Mount Robson				
Parapet Peak			52°40′01″N 118°17′39″W		Mount Robson				
Simon Peak			52°39′23″N 118°19′09″W		Mount Robson				one of the subpeaks of Mt Fraser, named for Simon Fraser
Bennington Peak			52°39′17″N 118°17′53″W						Bennington is the north peak of Mt Fraser, which was named for Simon Fraser, explorer, who was born in Bennington, Vermont, the namesake of this peak
McDonell Peak			52°39′05″N 118°18′22″W		Mount Robson				one of the subpeaks of Mt Fraser
Scarp Mountain			52°37′59″N 118°21′21″W		Mount Robson				
Mastodon Mountain			52°36′27″N 118°20′19″W		Mount Robson				
Elephas Mountain			52°35′48″N 118°19′47″W		Mount Robson				
Whitecrow Mountain			52°35′00″N 118°16′00″W		Mount Robson				named because of the large number of white crows seen on its face by members of the interprovincial boundary survey
Blackrock Mountain			52°34′17″N 118°17′59″W		Mount Robson				named for the peak's black rock
Divergence Peak			52°30′00″N 117°59′30″W		Hamber				named because it forms a corner in the interprovincial boundary
Alnus Peak			52°29′15″N 118°00′26″W		Hamber				alnus is the Latin word for alder, groves of which are abundant on the mountain
Mount Ross Cox			52°27′31″N 118°01′05″W						named after Ross Cox, author of a book The Columbia River, publ.1832
Mallard Peak			52°27′30″N 118°13′39″W		Hamber				
Mount Scott			52°26′54″N 118°03′21″W		Hamber				Named after Capt. Scott of the British Antarctic Expedition
Lick Peak			52°26′48″N 117°54′58″W	Fortress Lake	Hamber				
Mount Oates			52°26′20″N 118°02′01″W						named after Lawrence Oates, an officer of the British Antarctic Expedition
Mount Ermatinger			52°25′03″N 118°02′45″W						named after Edward Ermatinger who with his brother Francis served with the Hudson's Bay Company in the Columbia District from 1818 onwards
Mount Hooker			52°24′20″N 118°05′41″W	Athabasca Pass					named by David Douglas for Sir William Jackson Hooker (1785–1865), distinguished botanist of the time (1827)
McGillivray Ridge			52°23′26″N 118°10′22″W						named after William McGillivray (1764–1825), North West Company partner and politician in Lower Canada
Fortress Mountain		3000	52°23′23″N 117°43′18″W	Fortress Lake	Hamber				
Younghusband Ridge			52°14′04″N 117°48′42″W						named after British Lieutenant Colonel Sir Francis Younghusband, who led the expedition named for him into Tibet in the 1930s and established relations with the Dalai Lama
Apex Mountain			52°12′55″N 117°49′15″W						
Chaba Peak			52°11′54″N 117°40′19″W	Fortress Lake					"Chaba" is the Stoney (Nakoda) word for "beaver", commemorating Job Beaver, a Stoney from Morley, Alberta, who hunted in this area
Eden Peak			52°11′17″N 117°43′58″W						
Snow Dome		3456	52°11′15″N 117°18′59″W	Columbia Icefield					
Wales Peak			52°11′06″N 117°39′25″W						
Mount King Edward			52°09′24″N 117°31′11″W	Columbia Icefield					
Mount Columbia		3747	52°08′50″N 117°26′30″W	Columbia Icefield					
Omega Peak			52°07′45″N 117°34′44″W	Columbia Icefield					
Triad Peak			52°07′43″N 117°33′29″W						
Watchman Peak			52°02′29″N 117°14′02″W	Thompson Pass					
Mount Spring-Rice			52°01′00″N 117°14′08″W	Thompson Pass					named in 1919 for Sir Cecil Arthur Spring-Rice (1859–1918); British ambassador to Persia, 1906–1908; British ambassador to Sweden 1908–1913; British ambassador to USA 1913–1918.
Quéant Mountain			52°00′29″N 117°14′24″W						named for Quéant, France, captured by Canadian troops on September 2, 1918
Fresnoy Mountain			51°59′48″N 117°13′01″W						named after Fresnoy, Ainse, France, in commemoration of its liberation by Canadian troops on April 13, 1917
Mount Alexandra			51°58′51″N 117°11′54″W						named in 1902 to commemorate Queen Alexandra
Douai Mountain			51°58′37″N 117°11′23″W						named in 1919 to commemorate the town of Douai, France, liberated by Canadian and other Allied troops on 18 October 1918
Oppy Mountain		3311	51°58′24″N 117°08′56″W						named for Oppy, a village 6 mi SE of Lens, France where many Canadian troops died
Farbus Mountain			51°57′48″N 117°07′49″W						named for Farbus, France, on the east slope of Vimy Ridge, to commemorate the Canadians who fought there in World War I
Mount Lyell		3504	51°57′25″N 117°06′13″W						named in 1858 after Sir Charles Lyell (1795–1875), the noted British geologist
Ernest Peak			51°57′24″N 117°06′13″W						named for Ernest Feuz, of Interlaken, Switzerland, who was one of five climbing guides brought by the CPR to Glacier House. One of five peaks on Mount Lyell named for this group of guides
Walter Peak			51°57′08″N 117°06′08″W						named for Walter Feuz, of Interlaken, Switzerland, who was one of five climbing guides brought by the CPR to Glacier House. One of five peaks on Mount Lyell named for this group of guides
Christian Peak			51°56′39″N 117°05′54″W						named for Christian Hässler, of Interlaken, Switzerland, who was one of five climbing guides brought by the CPR to Glacier House. One of five peaks on Mount Lyell named for this group of guides
Division Mountain			51°53′29″N 117°01′10″W						
Mons Peak			51°51′36″N 117°02′06″W						named for Mons, Belgium, scene of the first British fighting in World War I, 23 August 1914, and which was recaptured by Canadian troops immediately before the Armistice, 11 November 1918.
St. Julien Mountain		3090	51°50′13″N 117°00′33″W						named for scene of Canadian troops fighting Battle of St. Julien in World War I, April 1915.
Howse Peak		3295	51°48′50″N 116°40′52″W	Howse Pass/hd Blaeberry River					
Mount Synge		2972	51°48′20″N 116°39′44″W						named after Capt. M.H. Synge of the Royal Engineers, who advocated a transcontinental railway in 1852
Aiguille Peak			51°48′16″N 116°40′11″W	hd Blaeberry River					aiguille is French for "needle", referring to the peak's shape
Midway Peak			51°48′05″N 116°39′20″W						
Stairway Peak			51°47′36″N 116°39′22″W						
Ebon Peak			51°46′39″N 116°38′52″W						named because it appears black when other peaks are covered in snow
Mount Conway			51°45′50″N 116°47′36″W						named after Sir William Martin Conway, then-president of the Alpine Club, afterwards Baron Conway of Allington (1856–1937), famous mountain climber, and author of works on art and mountaineering; knighted 1895; elevated to the peerage in 1931.
Breaker Mountain			51°45′48″N 116°39′05″W	Howse Pass					
Mount Freshfield		3337	51°44′35″N 116°56′51″W	nr hd Valenciennes River					
Mount Lambe			51°44′16″N 116°49′17″W						
Barbette Mountain		3072	51°43′29″N 116°37′05″W						barbette refers to a mound of platform of earth on which gun emplacements are built; the mountain has two platform-like summits
Mount Whiteaves			51°43′27″N 116°47′56″W						named for J.F. Whiteaves, who was a paleontologist for the Geological Survey of Canada
Mount Pilkington			51°43′25″N 116°55′40″W						
Prior Peak	Mount Prior		51°43′15″N 116°55′52″W						named after Lt. Col Edward Gawlor Prior, commander of the 5th Regiment, Canadian Garrison Artillery, MP, Premier of British Columbia Nov 1902 to June 1903, later Lieutenant Governor of British Columbia Dec 18, 1919, until his death on December 12, 1920 [the only Lieutenant Governor to die in office]
Mount Bulyea			51°43′00″N 116°55′24″W						named after the Rt. Hon. George Hedley Vicars Bulyea (1859–1928), first Lieutenant Governor of Alberta, 1905–15
Mount Low			51°43′00″N 116°48′08″W						
Mount Leman			50°44′02″N 115°24′48″W		Height of the Rockies				named after General G. Leman, in command of defenses of Liège, Belgium in 1914
Mount Queen Elizabeth			50°42′46″N 115°24′21″W						named after Queen Elizabeth of Belgium in 1916; Mount King Albert nearby is named for her husband King Albert
Mistaya Mountain			51°42′44″N 116°35′10″W						
Mount Barnard			51°42′33″N 116°55′22″W						named in 1917 after the Rt. Hon. Francis Stillman Barnard, then Lieutenant-Governor of British Columbia (see Barnard's Express)
Gilgit Mountain	Mount Gilgit		51°42′33″N 116°51′16″W						
Nanga Parbat Mountain			51°42′21″N 116°51′57″W	hd Mummery Glacier					named after Nanga Parbat in the Himalayas, apparently in association with nearby Mount Mummery because its namesake A. F. Mummery had died there
Mount Helmer			51°42′20″N 116°50′25″W						named jointly after Brigadier General Richard Alexis Helmer (1864–1920) and his only son Lieutenant Alexis Hannum Helmer (1892–1915)
Mount Barlow			51°42′19″N 116°48′39″W						
Mount Trutch	Trutch Mountain		51°42′17″N 116°52′55″W						named after Sir Joseph William Trutch, colonial official and first Lieutenant-Governor of British Columbia, 1871–1876
Waitabit Peak			51°42′09″N 116°54′00″W						
Trapper Peak			51°40′40″N 116°35′33″W		Banff				
Mount Baker	Stremotch Mountain	3180	51°39′55″N 116°35′52″W						
Mount Habel			51°38′55″N 116°34′17″W						
Mount Rhondda			51°38′41″N 116°33′57″W		Yoho/Banff				named after Rhondda, Wales
St. Nicholas Peak			51°37′40″N 116°30′09″W		Yoho/Banff				named after its resemblance to Santa Claus aka St. Nicholas
Mount Olive			51°36′40″N 116°29′30″W						
Mount Balfour			51°33′55″N 116°27′58″W	Balfour Pass	Yoho/Banff				
Lilliput Mountain			51°33′04″N 116°24′44″W		Yoho/Banff				Lilliput is the name of a fictional country in Jonathan Swift's Gulliver's Travels
Mount Daly			51°31′07″N 116°23′44″W		Yoho/Banff				named after Charles F. Daly, president of the American Geographical Society 1864–1899
Mount Bosworth			51°27′53″N 116°20′01″W	Wapta Lake	Yoho/Banff				
Popes Peak	Boundary Peak		51°24′11″N 116°17′43″W		Yoho/Banff				
Collier Peak			51°23′27″N 116°18′12″W		Kootenay/Banff				
Mount Victoria		3464	51°22′40″N 116°18′28″W		Yoho/Banff				
Mount Lefroy		3423	51°21′45″N 116°16′47″W		Yoho/Banff				
Mount Little			51°21′45″N 116°16′47″W		Kootenay				
Glacier Peak			51°21′03″N 116°17′04″W		Kootenay				
Ringrose Peak			51°20′34″N 116°17′28″W		Yoho				
Mount Hungabee	Hungabee Mountain	3,492	51°20′N 116°17′W	Bow Range	Yoho/Banff				
Wenkchemna Peak			51°19′43″N 116°16′35″W		Yoho/Banff				"Wenkchemna" means "ten" in Stoney (Nakoda); this is the tenth of the ten-peak Wenkchemna Peaks
Neptuak Mountain			51°18′28″N 116°15′28″W		Kootenay/Yoho/Banff				"Neptuak" is the Stoney (Nakoda) word for "nine" - this is the ninth of the ten Wenkchmena Peaks. Neptuak Mtn is at the apex of the boundaries of Yoho, Kootenay and Banff Nat'l Parks
Deltaform Mountain		3424	51°18′06″N 116°14′43″W		Kootenay				
Mount Bowlen			51°18′06″N 116°11′22″W	Kootenay Pass					named after the Hon. John J. Bowlen, Lieutenant-Governor of Alberta at the time of naming (1958)
Mount Tuzo			51°18′00″N 116°14′00″W		Kootenay/Banff				
Mount Fay			51°17′51″N 116°09′48″W		Kootenay				
Mount Perren			51°17′46″N 116°12′32″W		Kootenay				named after Walter Perren, Chief Warden of Banff Nat'l Park 1955–1967. This is the fifth of the ten Wenkchemna Peaks
Mount Little			51°17′45″N 116°11′01″W		Kootenay				
Mount Allen	3210		51°17′32″N 116°13′15″W		Kootenay/Banff				
Quadra Mountain	Mount Quadra		51°17′13″N 116°09′12″W		Kootenay				named after Juan Francisco de la Bodega y Quadra, Spanish explorer of the Northwest Coast
Chimney Peak			51°15′52″N 116°09′19″W		Kootenay				
Boom Mountain			51°15′04″N 116°04′43″W						named in association with Boom Lake on its Alberta side, which was named for driftwood that resembled a boom of logs
Storm Mountain			51°12′28″N 116°00′15″W	Vermilion Pass	Kootenay				
Beatrice Peak			51°09′46″N 116°01′35″W	Ball Range	Banff				
Mount Ball			51°09′23″N 116°00′23″W	Ball Range					named after John Ball (1818–1889), under secretary of state for the colonies, 1855–1857
Isabelle Peak			51°07′34″N 116°00′33″W	Ball Range	Kootenay/Banff				
Haiduk Peak			51°06′10″N 115°57′04″W	Ball Range	Kootenay				named for the Haiduk region of Hungary or for the Romanian village of Hideghut (also known as Haiduk)
Scarab Peak		2918	51°05′46″N 115°55′58″W	Ball Range	Kootenay/Banff				
Twin Cairns	Wa-Wa Ridge, Twin Cairns Ridge		51°04′20″N 115°48′19″W		Mount Assiniboine				
Standish Hump	Standish Ridge		51°04′16″N 115°47′12″W		Mount Assiniboine				
Quartz Hill		2580	51°02′11″N 115°45′43″W		Mount Assiniboine				
Fatigue Mountain			51°01′40″N 115°41′36″W		Mount Assiniboine				
Citadel Peak			51°00′59″N 115°43′07″W		Mount Assiniboine				
Golden Mountain			50°59′56″N 115°40′13″W		Mount Assiniboine				
Nasswald Peak			50°59′55″N 115°39′05″W		Mount Assiniboine				named after Nasswald, Austria, the home village of climber Conrad Kain
Og Mountain			50°57′33″N 115°36′05″W	Assiniboine Pass	Mount Assiniboine				named in association with Mount Magog and other Magog/Gog/Og placenames in this area
Cave Mountain			50°56′24″N 115°35′53″W	N side Assiniboine Pass					there is a cave on the Alberta (SE) side of the mountain
Mount Cautley			50°54′29″N 115°34′19″W	Assiniboine Pass					
Wonder Peak			50°53′27″N 115°34′19″W		Mount Assiniboine				
The Towers			50°53′13″N 115°36′07″W		Mount Assiniboine				
Terrapin Mountain	Mount Terrapin		50°52′48″N 115°37′03″W		Mount Assiniboine				named for resemblance to a terrapin (sea turtle)
Mount Magog			50°52′45″N 115°38′05″W						
Mount Assiniboine		3618	50°52′10″N 115°39′03″W		Mount Assiniboine				from Cree means "those who cook with hot stones in water", i.e. the Stoney Sioux or Nakoda
Lunette Peak			50°51′57″N 115°38′57″W						see lunette
Mount Gloria		2908	50°50′46″N 115°36′27″W						
Aye Mountain	Mount Aye		50°50′41″N 115°38′36″W						
Eon Mountain	Mount Eon	3305	50°50′06″N 115°37′27″W						
Aurora Mountain	Mount Aurora		50°49′38″N 115°33′40″W		Mount Assiniboine				named after RN cruiser HMS Aurora, engaged in battledon the North Sea, January 24, 1915. Not to be confused with Mount Aurora in Antarctica
Windy Ridge	Windy Pass		50°57′40″N 115°36′55″W		Mount Assiniboine				NW side of Og Mountain; see BCGNIS re "Windy Pass" name
Red Man Mountain	Mount Red Man		50°47′18″N 115°31′59″W		Mount Assiniboine				named after the red colour of its rock, and in contrast to White Man Mountain
Mount Leval			50°45′23″N 115°26′15″W		Height of the Rockies				named after Gaston de Leval, the Belgian lawyer who defended British nurse Edith Cavell. Cavell had been charged with treason by the Germans for aiding Allied soldiers and was shot by a firing squad, October 12, 1915
White Man Mountain			50°45′20″N 115°28′57″W		Mount Assiniboine				
Mount Robertson			50°44′00″N 115°19′00″W	Palliser Pass/North Kananaskis Pass					named after General Sir William Robertson (1860–1933), chief of the Imperial General Staff, 1915–18. Made a Baronet 1919; field marshal 1920
Mount Sir Douglas		3411	50°43′21″N 115°20′20″W	Palliser Pass/North Kananaskis Pass					named after Field Marshal Sir Douglas Haig, KT, GCB (1861–1928), Commander-in-Chief of the British forces in France and Belgium, December 1915. Later raised to the perage as the 1st Earl Haig of Bemersyde
Mount Williams			50°43′06″N 115°21′50″W		Height of the Rockies				
Mount King Albert		2987	50°42′43″N 115°24′54″W						named after King Albert I of Belgium in 1916
Mount Maude			50°42′03″N 115°18′11″W						
Mount Beatty			50°40′09″N 115°17′23″W	W of hd Pallilser River	Height of the Rockies				named after Admiral Sir David Beatty, First Earl of the North Sea and of Brooksby, (1871–1936), commander of the Grand Fleet 1916–19
Mount Worthington			50°37′36″N 115°17′50″W		Height of the Rockies				
Mount McHarg		2888	50°37′32″N 115°18′18″W						
Defender Mountain			50°36′05″N 115°17′27″W						named after the destroyer HMS Defender, which fought in the Battle of Jutland, May 31, 1916
Mount Northover		3048	50°35′22″N 115°14′27″W					"Mount Northover". Bivouac.com.	named in 1917 for Lieut. A.W. Northover of the 28th Battalion of the Canadian Expeditionary Force of World War I
Mount Tyrwhitt			50°34′57″N 115°00′58″W	Elk Pass					named after Rear Admiral Sir Reginald Yorke Tyrwhitt GCB, DSO, (1870- ), 1st baronet of Terschelling and of the City of Oxford; leader of British destroyer flotillas in WW I, later Admiral of the Fleet
Mount Foch			50°34′24″N 115°09′27″W		Elk Lakes				named after Marshal Ferdinand Foch (1852–1931), hero of the Battle of the Marne, defender of Paris during the Battle of the Somme
Warrior Mountain	Mount Warrior		50°34′08″N 115°14′18″W						named after the cruiser HMS Warrior, which was destroyed in the Battle of Jutland, May 31, 1916
Mount Cordonnier			50°33′00″N 115°13′50″W		Height of the Rockies				named after General Cordonnier, command of French forces at the Salonika front, 1916
Unnamed Alberta–BC mountain (formerly Mount Pétain)		3196	50°32′39″N 115°11′07″W						named after Philippe Pétain (1856–1951), French soldier and statesman, a national hero for his defence of Verdun (1916), and was made commander-in-chief (1917) and marshal of France (1918); in World War II he became infamous as a collaborator with Nazi Germany as dictator of Vichy France and was after the war tried for treason and sentenced to death, with that sentence commuted to life imprisonment.
Mount Mangin			50°32′30″N 115°13′33″W		Height of the Rockies				named after General Charles Marie Emmanuel Mangin (1866–1925) of the French Army, who won honours in the Battle of the Labyrinth, 1915, and further distinguished himself the following year at the second Battle of Verdun.
Storelk Mountain			50°32′18″N 114°59′00″W						
Mount Fox			50°34′14″N 115°07′09″W		Elk Lakes				believed to be named after Sir Charles Fox (1810–1874) British railway engineer associated with the introduction of the parallel switch."
Mount Joffre		3450	50°31′42″N 115°12′25″W					Elk Lakes	named after Marshal Joseph Jacques Césaire Joffre (1852–1931), Commander-in-Chief of the French armies, 1915–17.
Mount Odlum			50°29′11″N 114°56′17″W						named after Major-General Victor Wentworth Odlum, CB, CMG, DSO (1880 - 1953?), Vancouver newspaper editor and insurance broker, commander of the British Columbia Regiment, Canadian Expeditionary Force, WW I; Vancouver MLA, 1924–28; High Commissioner to Australia, 1940; Minister to China, 1942; Minister to Turkey, 1947.
Mount Loomis			50°27′45″N 114°55′11″W		Elk Lakes				named after Major-General Sir Frederick Oscar Warren Loomis, CMG, DSO, KCB (1870–1937), Montreal manufacturer and contractor; commander of Western Canadian Infantry Brigade in WW I.
Mount McPhail			50°24′30″N 114°51′41″W	Fording River Pass					
Mount Bishop			50°26′24″N 114°52′35″W						named after World War I fighter pilot, Air Marshal William Avery Bishop, VC, DSO, MC; ("Billy" Bishop)
Mount Muir			50°23′39″N 114°49′34″W	Fording River Pass					named after Alex Muir (died 1906), author of "The Maple Leaf"
Mount Strachan		2682	50°22′57″N 114°49′06″W						named after Harcus Strachan, VC, MC
Mount Maclaren	Mount Mclaren		50°21′31″N 114°47′23″W						named after Brigadier-General Charles H. Maclaren, DSO, (1878–1962)
Mount Cornwell			50°18′02″N 114°46′53″W	hd Fording River					named after Jack Cornwell VC, HMS Chester, boy hero of the Battle of Jutland, 31 May 1916.
Mount Bolton			50°19′48″N 114°48′04″W						
Mount Armstrong			50°21′01″N 114°46′04″W	hd Fording River					
Baril Peak			50°17′58″N 114°45′22″W	NE of Elkford					
Mount Etherington			50°16′16″N 114°45′34″W	Fording River Pass					
Mount Scrimger			50°14′36″N 114°46′10″W						
Mount Holcroft			50°14′05″N 114°45′54″W						
Mount Farquhar			50°12′55″N 114°45′01″W						
Mount Gass			50°07′15″N 114°44′16″W	NE of Elkford					
Mount Lyall	The Cone		50°05′22″N 114°42′20″W	immediately NE of Elkford					
Beehive Mountain			50°03′56″N 114°39′46″W	E of Elkford					name is descriptive of shape
Tornado Mountain			49°58′01″N 114°39′16″W						
Allison Peak	The Needle's Eye		49°44′36″N 114°38′46″W	Crowsnest Pass					Named after Douglas Allison, early settler on Allison Creek (Alberta) and former Royal North-West Mounted Police officer
Phillipps Peak			49°39′47″N 114°39′26″W	N side Crowsnest Pass					
Crowsnest Ridge			49°38′11″N 114°39′30″W	N side Crowsnest Pass					
Loop Ridge			49°36′30″N 114°44′35″W	W side Crowsnest Pass					
Andy Good Peak			49°33′55″N 114°35′17″W	S side Crowsnest Pass					named after a hotelkeeper at an 1899-era railway boomtown in the pass, Crowsnest)
Tent Mountain			49°33′14″N 114°42′19″W						
Mount Ptolemy			49°32′57″N 114°37′52″W						see Ptolemy
Mount McGladrey			49°30′36″N 114°35′14″W						
Mount Pengelly			49°30′06″N 114°35′46″W						named in 1914 after the family name of the wife of A.J. Campbell, an assistant to A.O. Wheeler of the Interprovincial Boundary Survey
Mount Darrah			49°28′22″N 114°35′37″W						named after Capt. Charles John Darrah, RE, astronomer to the International Boundary Commission, which with its US counterpart surveyed the BC portion of the 49th parallel 1858–1862.
Hollebeke Mountain			49°22′37″N 114°34′03″W						named after Hollebeke a village near Ypres, Belgium
St. Eloi Mountain			49°19′35″N 114°28′44″W						named after St. Eloi, Belgium, near Ypres, where Canadians fought in 1916
Mount Haig		2612	49°17′21″N 114°26′47″W	Middle Kootenay Pass					named after Capt. Robert Wolseley Haig, RA, astronomer to the International Boundary Commission, which with its US counterpart surveyed the BC portion of the 49th Parallel 1858–1862.
Rainy Ridge			49°14′52″N 114°22′50″W						
Three Lakes Ridge			49°14′14″N 114°24′10″W						
Scarpe Mountain			49°12′48″N 114°24′08″W						named for the Scarpe River, which flows through Arras, France, where Canadians fought in 1917–18
La Coulotte Peak			49°12′01″N 114°19′06″W						La Coulotte is a village near Lens, France
Mount Matkin			49°11′20″N 114°13′37″W						
La Coulotte Ridge			49°11′13″N 114°17′31″W						La Coulotte is a village near Lens, France
Font Mountain			49°10′31″N 114°12′50″W						
Kishinena Peak			49°07′06″N 114°09′00″W	South Kootenay Pass					kishinena is the Ktunaxa word for white fir or balsam
Festubert Mountain	Burgess Mountain		49°04′58″N 114°07′58″W						Named after Festubert, a village near La Bassée, France, where Canadian troops fought in 1915.
Forum Peak		2415	49°00′14″N 114°04′17″W						just north of the Canada–United States border

== See also ==
- List of Boundary Peaks of the Alaska-British Columbia/Yukon border
- Extreme points of British Columbia
