= Beacon Peak =

Mountain in Alberta, Canada

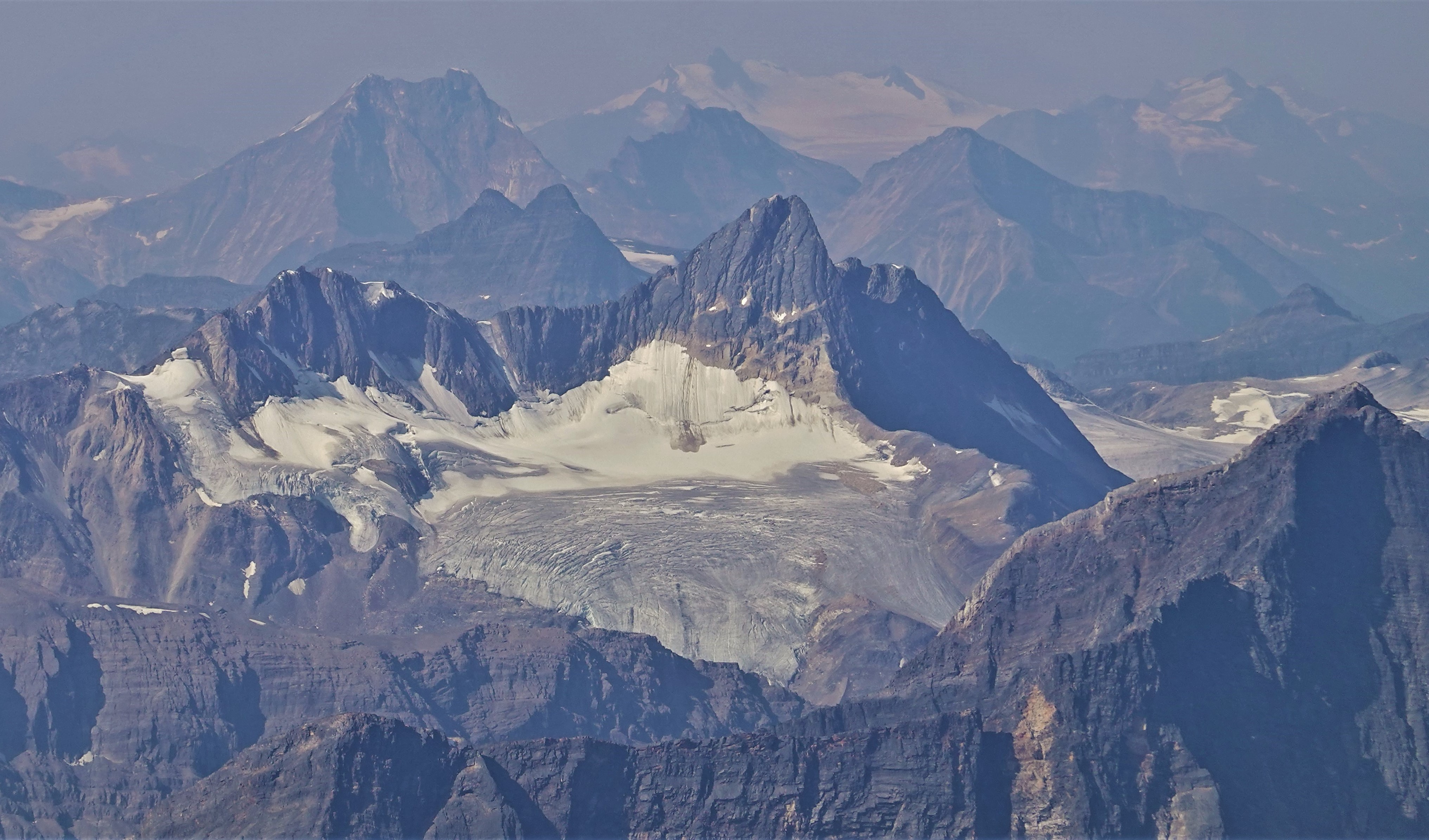
- Northeast aspect

Highest point
- Elevation: 2,986 m (9,797 ft)
- Prominence: 816 m (2,677 ft)
- Parent peak: Mastodon Mountain (2986 m)
- Listing: Mountains of Alberta
- Coordinates: 52°32′25″N 118°14′32″W

Geography
- Location within Alberta
- Country: Canada
- Province: Alberta
- Protected area: Jasper National Park
- Parent range: Park Ranges
- Topo map: NTS 83D9 Amethyst Lakes

Climbing
- First ascent: 1921 by Interprovincial Boundary Commission

Beacon Peak is a summit in Alberta, Canada.

Beacon Peak was named for the fact it stood as a landmark or "beacon".

== Climate ==
Based on the Köppen climate classification, Beacon Peak is located in a subarctic climate zone with cold, snowy winters, and mild summers. Winter temperatures can drop below −20 °C with wind chill factors below −30 °C.

== See also ==
- List of mountains in the Canadian Rockies
