= Mount Etherington =

Mountain in Alberta and British Columbia, U.S.

- Location within Alberta Location within British Columbia Location within Canada

Highest point
- Elevation: 2,877 m (9,439 ft)
- Prominence: 260 m (850 ft)
- Parent peak: Baril Peak (3,000 m)
- Listing: Mountains of Alberta; Mountains of British Columbia
- Coordinates: 50°16′16″N 114°45′34″W

Geography
- Country: Canada
- Provinces: Alberta and British Columbia
- Parent range: High Rock Range
- Topo map: NTS 82J7 Mount Head

Mount Etherington is located on the border of Alberta and British Columbia on the Continental Divide. It was named in 1918 after Colonel Frederick Etherington, C.M.G.

== See also ==
- List of peaks on the British Columbia–Alberta border
