= Festubert Mountain =

Mountain in the country of Canada

- Location within Alberta Location within British Columbia Location within Canada

Highest point
- Elevation: 2,520 m (8,270 ft)
- Prominence: 295 m (968 ft)
- Coordinates: 49°05′00″N 114°07′57″W

Geography
- Location: Alberta-British Columbia
- Topo map: NTS 82G1 Sage Creek

Festubert Mountain is located on the border of Alberta and British Columbia on the Continental Divide. It was named after Festubert, a village in France.

== See also ==
- List of peaks on the Alberta–British Columbia border
- Mountains of Alberta
- Mountains of British Columbia
