= Golden Mountain (Canada) =

Mountain in AB/BC, Canada

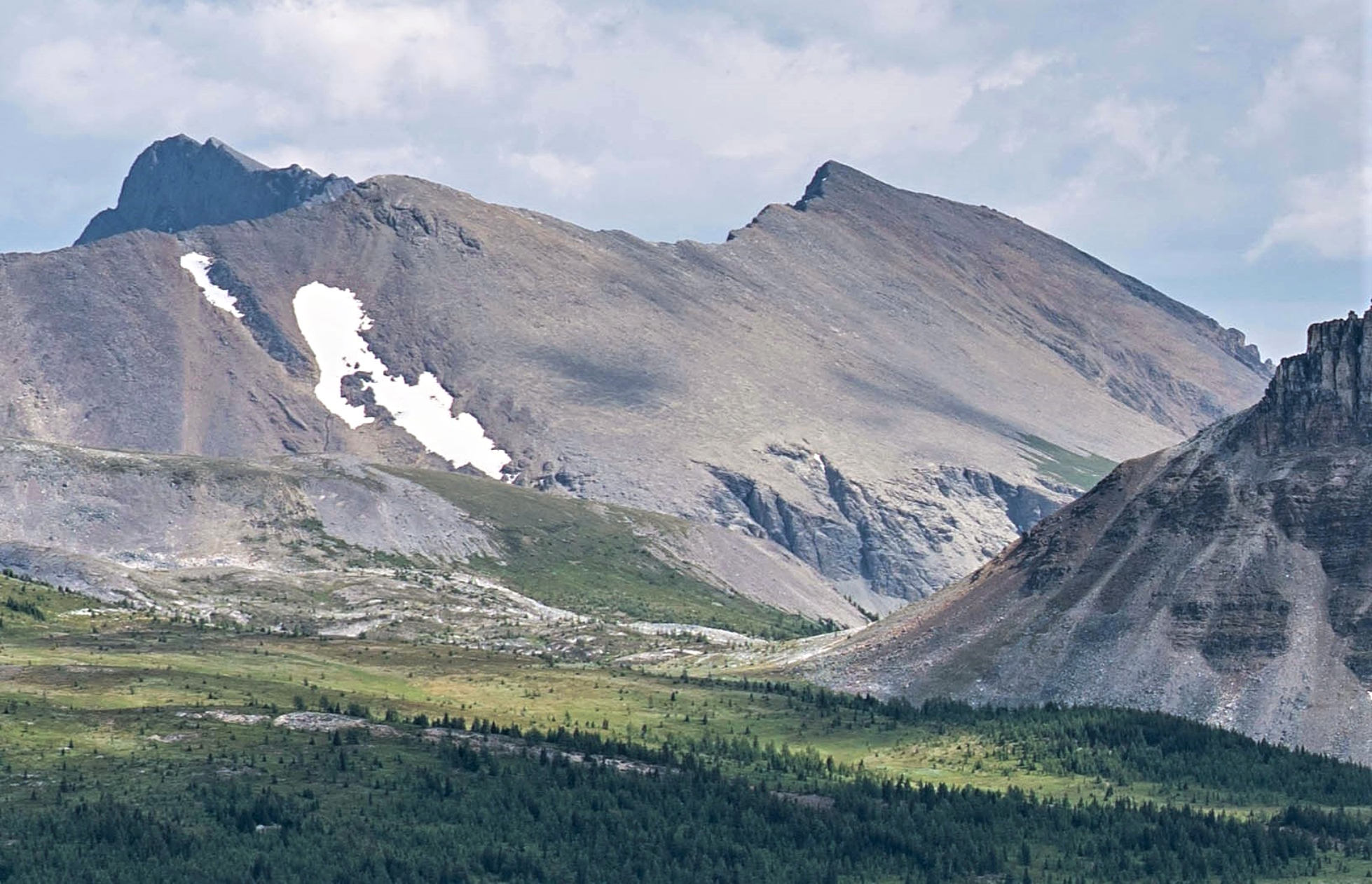

Highest point
- Elevation: 2,933 m (9,623 ft)
- Prominence: 131 m (430 ft)
- Parent peak: Nasswald Peak 3042 m
- Listing: Mountains of Alberta; Mountains of British Columbia
- Coordinates: 50°59′56″N 115°40′13″W

Geography
- Location within Alberta Location within British Columbia Location within Canada
- Country: Canada
- Provinces: Alberta and British Columbia
- Topo map: NTS 82J13 Mount Assiniboine

Golden Mountain is located on the border of Alberta and British Columbia on the Continental Divide.

== See also ==
- List of peaks on the Alberta–British Columbia border
