= Perseverance Mountain =

Mountain in Alberta and British Columbia, Canada

- Location within Alberta Location within British Columbia Location within Canada

Highest point
- Elevation: 2,434 m (7,986 ft)
- Prominence: 389 m (1,276 ft)
- Coordinates: 53°26′19″N 119°45′34″W

Geography
- Location: Alberta; British Columbia
- Topo map: NTS 83E5 Chalco Mountain

Perseverance Mountain is located on the border of Alberta and British Columbia.

== See also ==
- List of peaks on the Alberta–British Columbia border
- Mountains of Alberta
- Mountains of British Columbia
