= Fatigue Mountain =

Mountain in AB/BC, Canada

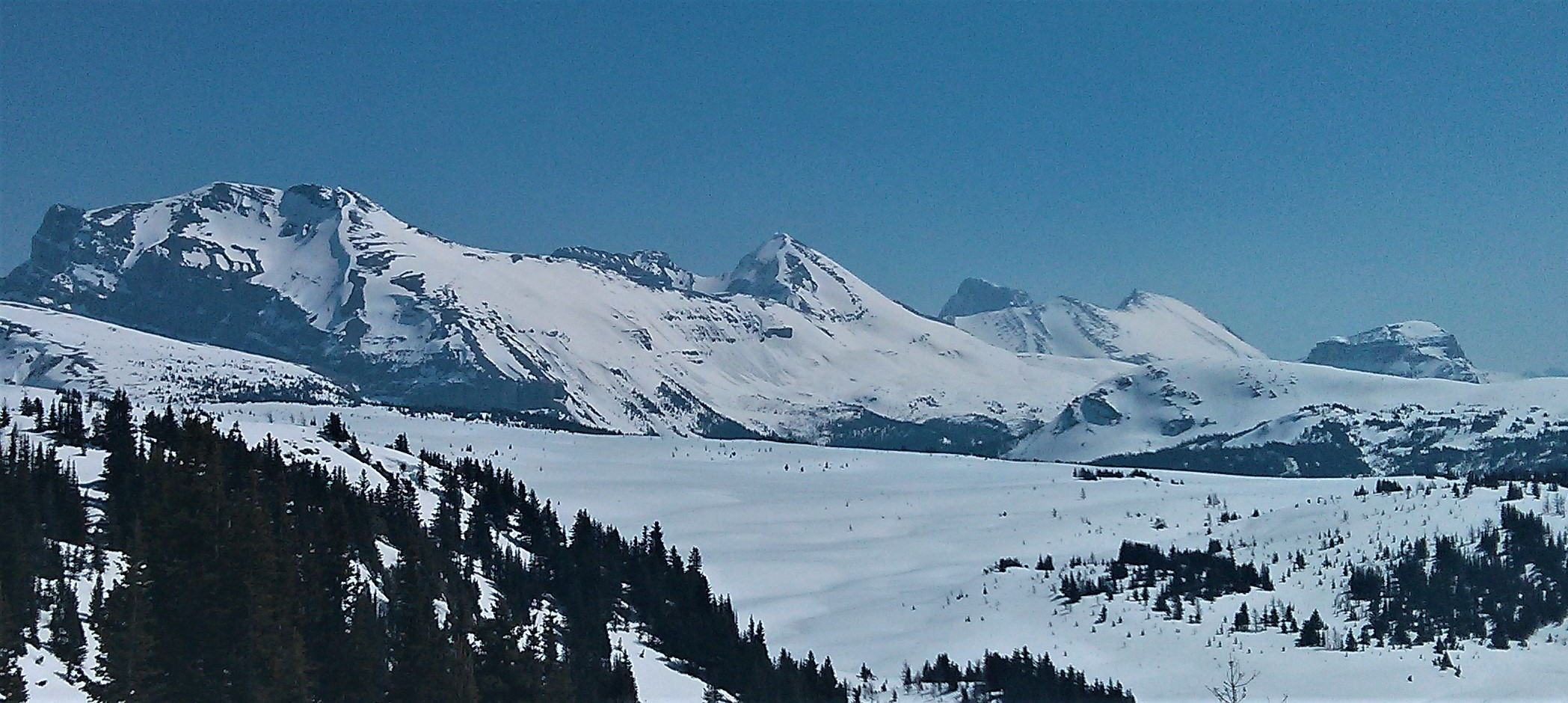
- Northwest aspect, centre

Highest point
- Elevation: 2,950 m (9,680 ft)
- Prominence: 556 m (1,824 ft)
- Parent peak: Nasswald Peak 3042 m
- Listing: Mountains of Alberta
- Coordinates: 51°01′42″N 115°41′37″W

Geography
- Location within Alberta Location within British Columbia Location within Canada
- Country: Canada
- Provinces: Alberta and British Columbia
- Parent range: Continental Ranges
- Topo map: NTS 82O4 Banff

Climbing
- First ascent: 1888 by W.S. Drewry

Fatigue Mountain is located on the border of Alberta and British Columbia on the Continental Divide The mountain was named in 1888 by W.S. Drewry who became fatigued on the first ascent.

== Climate ==
Based on the Köppen climate classification, Fatigue Mountain is located in a subarctic climate zone with cold, snowy winters, and mild summers. Winter temperatures can drop below -20 °C with wind chill factors below -30 °C.

== Gallery ==
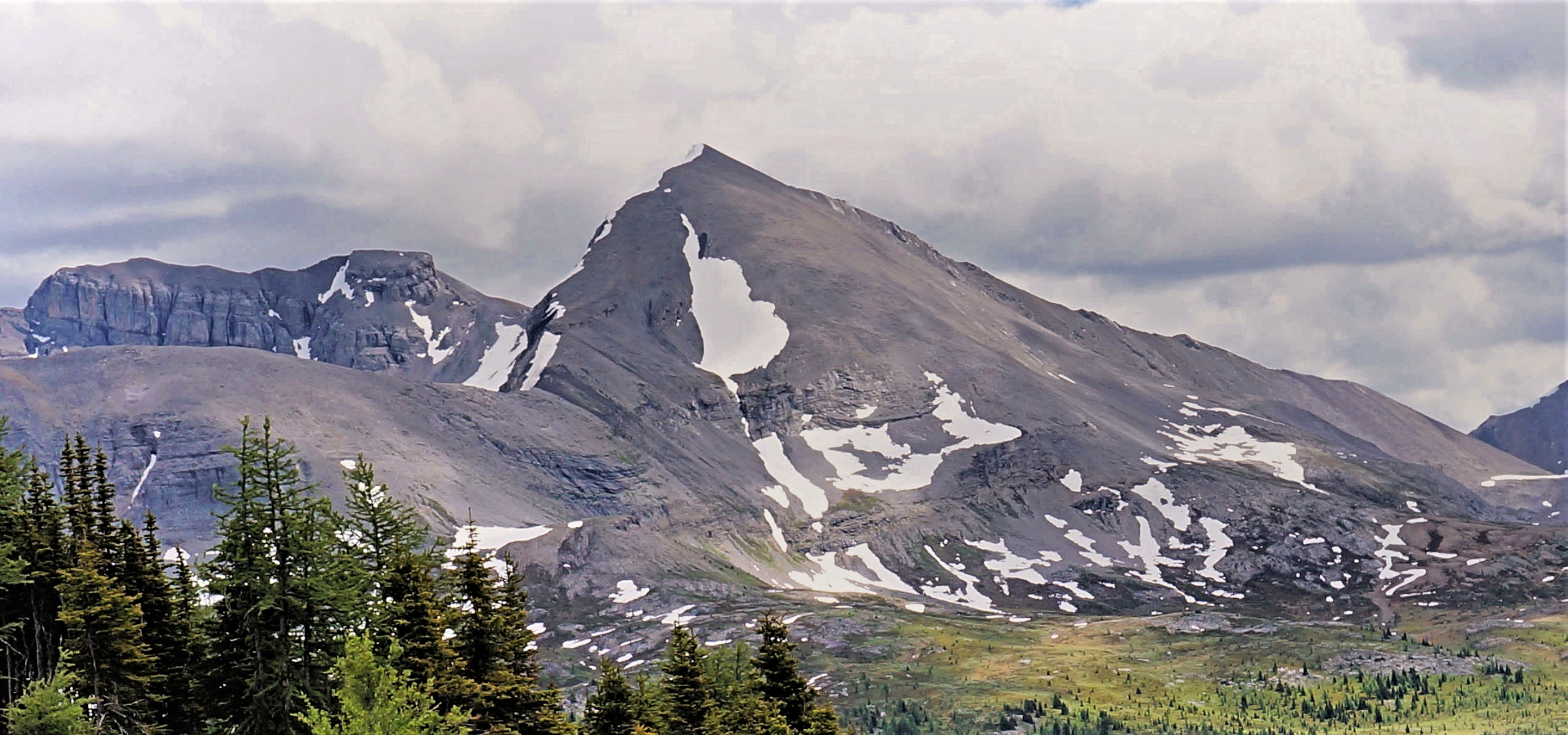
Fatigue Mountain

== See also ==
- List of peaks on the Alberta–British Columbia border
- Mountains of British Columbia
