= Watchman Peak =

Mountain in Alberta and British Columbia, Canada

- Location within Alberta Location within British Columbia Location within Canada

Highest point
- Elevation: 3,009 m (9,872 ft)
- Prominence: 135 m (443 ft)
- Parent peak: Mount Spring-Rice (3275 m)
- Listing: Mountains of Alberta; Mountains of British Columbia
- Coordinates: 52°02′29″N 117°13′59″W

Geography
- Country: Canada
- Provinces: Alberta and British Columbia
- Parent range: Park Ranges
- Topo map: NTS 83C3 Columbia Icefield

Climbing
- First ascent: 1918 Interprovincial Boundary Commission

Watchman Peak is located on the border of Alberta and British Columbia, on southern side of Thompson Pass. It was named in 1902 by James Outram.

== See also ==
- List of peaks on the British Columbia–Alberta border
