= Mount Holcroft =

Mountain in Alberta and British Columbia, Canada

- Location within Alberta Location within British Columbia Location within Canada

Highest point
- Elevation: 2,713 m (8,901 ft)
- Prominence: 254 m (833 ft)
- Parent peak: Mount Farquhar (2894 m)
- Listing: Mountains of Alberta; Mountains of British Columbia
- Coordinates: 50°14′05″N 114°45′51″W

Geography
- Country: Canada
- Provinces: Alberta and British Columbia
- Parent range: High Rock Range
- Topo map: NTS 82J2 Fording River

Mount Holcroft is located on the border of Alberta and British Columbia on the Continental Divide. It was named after Herbert Spencer Holcroft (1877-1916), H.S. D.L.S. in 1918. Lieutenant Spencer was wounded during World War I and later died in hospital of cardiac failure.

== See also ==
- List of peaks on the British Columbia–Alberta border
