= Caledonia Mountain =

Mountain in Western Canada

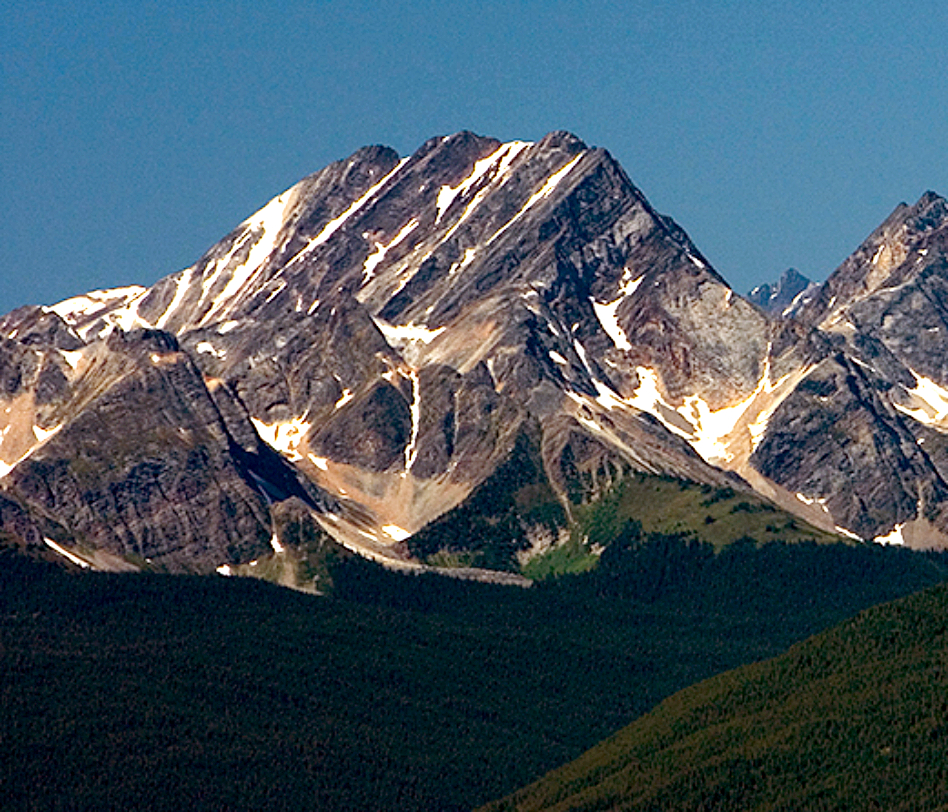
- Caledonia Mountain seen from The Whistlers

Highest point
- Elevation: 2,863 m (9,393 ft)
- Prominence: 913 m (2,995 ft)
- Listing: Mountains of Alberta; Mountains of British Columbia
- Coordinates: 52°57′05″N 118°39′08″W

Geography
- Location within Alberta Location within British Columbia Location within Canada
- Country: Canada
- Provinces: Alberta and British Columbia
- Parent range: Victoria Cross Ranges
- Topo map: NTS 83D15 Lucerne

Caledonia Mountain is a 2,863-metre (9,393-foot) summit located in the Canadian Rockies on the shared border of Alberta and British Columbia in Canada. It is also situated along the shared boundary of Jasper National Park with Mount Robson Provincial Park. It ranks as the 59th most prominent mountain in Alberta. It was named in 1926 due to its location overlooking the Caledonian Valley (now known as the Yellowhead Pass).

== Climate ==
Based on the Köppen climate classification, Caledonia Mountain is located in a subarctic climate with cold, snowy winters, and mild summers. Temperatures can drop below −20 °C with wind chill factors below −30 °C. In terms of favorable weather, June through September are the best months to climb. Precipitation runoff from the mountain drains west into tributaries of the Fraser River, or east into Miette River.

== Gallery ==
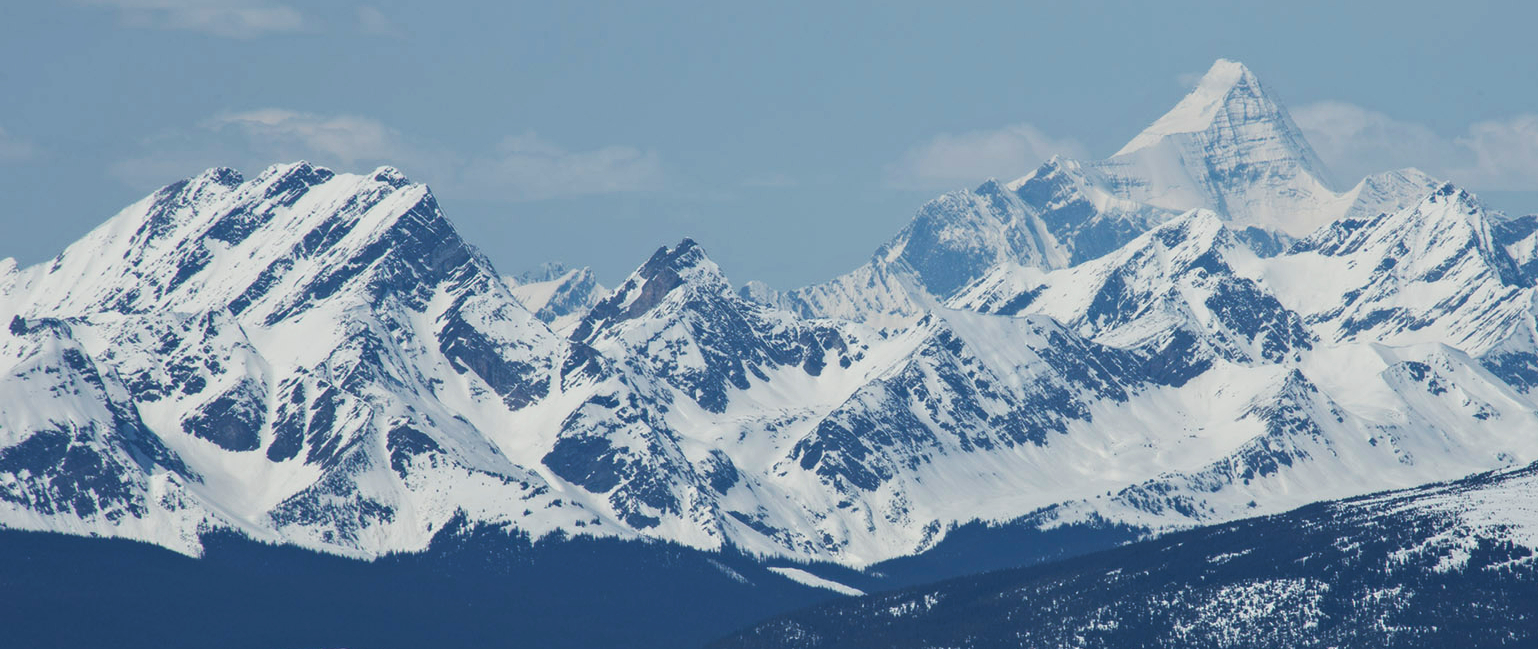
Caledonia Mountain (left) and Mount Robson (right)

== See also ==
- List of peaks on the Alberta–British Columbia border
