= Ebon Peak =

Mountain in the country of Canada

- Location within Alberta Location within British Columbia Location within Canada

Highest point
- Elevation: 2,921 m (9,583 ft)
- Prominence: 121 m (397 ft)
- Coordinates: 51°46′36″N 116°38′54″W

Geography
- Location: Alberta; British Columbia
- Topo map: NTS 82N15 Mistaya Lake

Climbing
- First ascent: 1972 S. King, D. Forest, J. Pomeroy, G. Schlee, M. Toft

Ebon Peak is a mountain located on the border of Alberta and British Columbia. It was named in 1917 by Arthur O. Wheeler.

== See also ==
- List of peaks on the Alberta–British Columbia border
- Mountains of Alberta
- Mountains of British Columbia
