= Mount Northover =

Mountain in Alberta and British Columbia, Canada

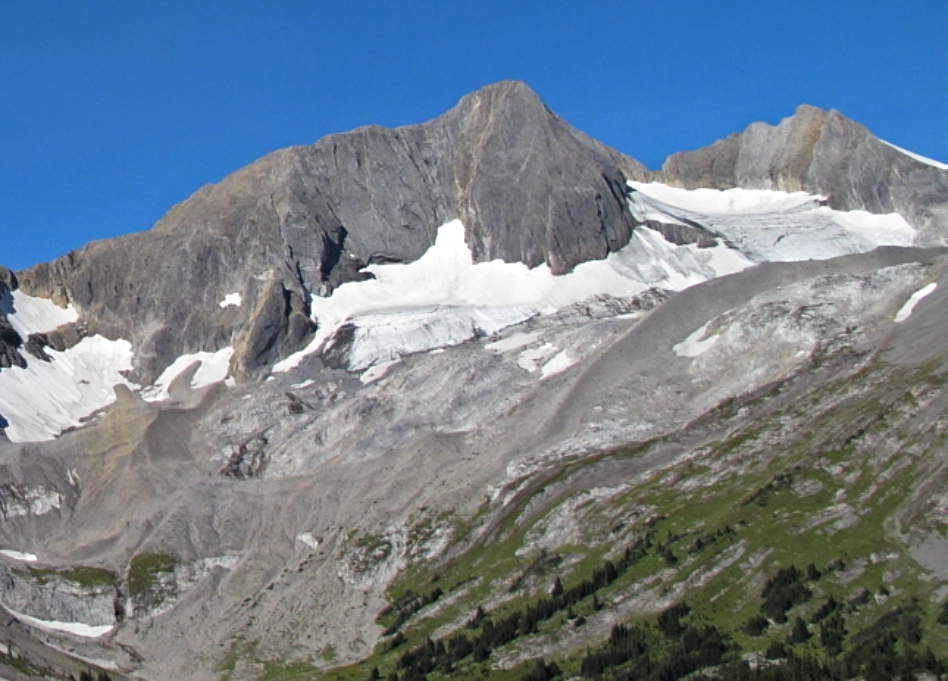

Highest point
- Elevation: 3,048 m (10,000 ft)
- Prominence: 347 m (1,138 ft)
- Parent peak: Mount Lyautey (3045 m)
- Listing: Mountains of Alberta; Mountains of British Columbia
- Coordinates: 50°35′20″N 115°14′25″W

Geography
- Location within Alberta Location within British Columbia Location within Canada
- Country: Canada
- Provinces: Alberta and British Columbia
- Parent range: Park Ranges
- Topo map: NTS 82J11 Kananaskis Lakes

Climbing
- First ascent: 1957 by S.A. Heiberg, P.J.B. Duffy, R.C. Hind, P. Ranier, I. Spreat
- Easiest route: Difficult Scramble with severe exposure

Mount Northover is located on the border of Alberta and British Columbia on the Continental Divide. The nearest higher peak is Mount Lyautey, 2.0 km (1.2 mi) to the north-northeast. It was named in 1917 after Lieutenant A.W. Northover, M.C., one of western Canada's first war heroes. Northover had recently migrated there from the United Kingdom and started a new family there.

A Boer War veteran, Northover enlisted at Regina in the North-West Battalion. He served with the 28th Battalion, C.E.F., and was awarded the Military Cross for action taken on Oct. 8, 1915. In 1916 he returned to Canada on a speaking tour, visiting relatives in Edmonton.

== Climate ==
Based on the Köppen climate classification, Mount Northover is located in a subarctic climate zone with cold, snowy winters, and mild summers. Temperatures can drop below −20 °C with wind chill factors below −30 °C.

== See also ==
- List of peaks on the British Columbia–Alberta border
