= Mount Gass =

Mountain in the country of Canada

- Location within Alberta Location within British Columbia Location within Canada

Highest point
- Elevation: 2,865 m (9,400 ft)
- Prominence: 457 m (1,499 ft)
- Listing: Mountains of Alberta; Mountains of British Columbia
- Coordinates: 50°07′15″N 114°44′16″W

Geography
- Country: Canada
- Provinces: Alberta and British Columbia
- Parent range: High Rock Range
- Topo map: NTS 82J2 Fording River

Mount Gass is a mountain located on the boundary of Alberta and British Columbia on the Continental Divide and is part of the Rocky Mountain chain. It was named in 1928 after Lieutenant Lawrence Henderson Gass.Gass was killed in action on April 8, 1917 during WWI while serving with the Canadian Garrison Artillery. Before the war, Gass was employed with the Geological Survey of Canada, and worked on surveys of the British Columbia's railway belt during the seasons of 1913, 1914 and 1915.

The mountain is 2,865 metres (9,400 ft) tall and has two peaks, the southernmost being the highest. In 1948, King Bearpaw, a Stoney Indian, and Bill Watt went prospecting on the mountain, specifically on the eastern peak where they had seen unusual looking rocks. They later discovered lead ore, silver, zinc, and a small amount of gold.

== See also ==
- List of peaks on the British Columbia–Alberta border
