= Razorback Mountain =

Mountain in the country of Canada

- Location within Alberta Location within British Columbia Location within Canada

Highest point
- Elevation: 2,605 m (8,547 ft)
- Prominence: 177 m (581 ft)
- Listing: Mountains of Alberta; Mountains of British Columbia
- Coordinates: 52°58′42″N 118°44′22″W

Geography
- Location: Alberta; British Columbia
- Parent range: Victoria Cross Ranges
- Topo map: NTS 83D15 Lucerne

Razorback Mountain is located on the border of Alberta and British Columbia. It was named in 1915 for the narrow ridge on the mountain.

== See also ==
- List of peaks on the Alberta–British Columbia border
- Mountains of Alberta
- Mountains of British Columbia
