= Mallard Peak =

Mountain in the country of Canada

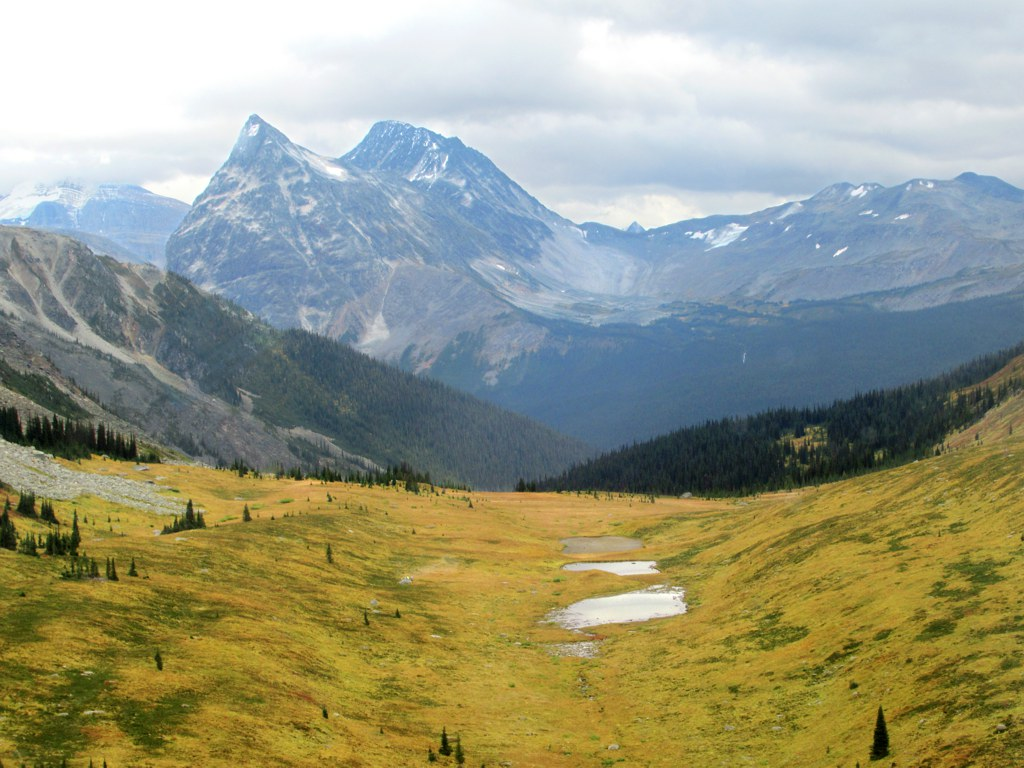
- Northwest aspect, from Fraser Pass

Highest point
- Elevation: 2,848 m (9,344 ft)
- Prominence: 828 m (2,717 ft)
- Coordinates: 52°27′30″N 118°18′42″W

Geography
- Location within Alberta Location within British Columbia Location within Canada
- Location: Alberta; British Columbia
- Topo map: NTS 83D8 Athabasca Pass

Climbing
- First ascent: 1920 Interprovincial Boundary Commission

Mallard Peak is located on the border of Alberta and British Columbia. It is Alberta's 82nd most prominent mountain. It was named in 1920 by Arthur O. Wheeler. The summit of the mountain is said to look like a mallard duck.

== See also ==
- List of peaks on the Alberta–British Columbia border
- Mountains of Alberta
- Mountains of British Columbia
