= Salient Mountain =

Mountain in Canada

- Location within Alberta Location within British Columbia Location within Canada

Highest point
- Elevation: 2,810 m (9,220 ft)
- Prominence: 836 m (2,743 ft)
- Listing: Mountains of Alberta; Mountains of British Columbia
- Coordinates: 53°02′47″N 118°42′12″W

Geography
- Country: Canada
- Provinces: Alberta and British Columbia
- District: Cariboo Land District
- Parent range: Front Ranges
- Topo map: NTS 83E2 Resplendent Creek

Salient Mountain is located just north of Miette Pass, at the NE end of Mount Robson Provincial Park on the Continental Divide marking the Alberta-British Columbia border. It is Alberta's 80th most prominent mountain. It was named in 1922 by Arthur O. Wheeler. It was noted to be the "sharpest" peak in the area.

== See also ==
- List of peaks on the Alberta–British Columbia border
