= Three Lakes Ridge =

Mountain in Alberta/British Columbia, Canada

- Location within Alberta Location within British Columbia Location within Canada

Highest point
- Elevation: 2,492 m (8,176 ft)
- Prominence: 182 m (597 ft)
- Listing: Mountains of Alberta; Mountains of British Columbia
- Coordinates: 49°14′31″N 114°24′06″W

Geography
- Country: Canada
- Provinces: Alberta and British Columbia
- Parent range: Flathead Range
- Topo map: NTS 82G1 Sage Creek

Three Lakes Ridge is located north of Scarpe Mountain and straddles the Continental Divide marking the Alberta-British Columbia border. It was named by the Interprovincial Boundary Survey.

== See also ==
- List of peaks on the Alberta–British Columbia border
