= Storelk Mountain =

Mountain in Alberta and British Columbia, Canada

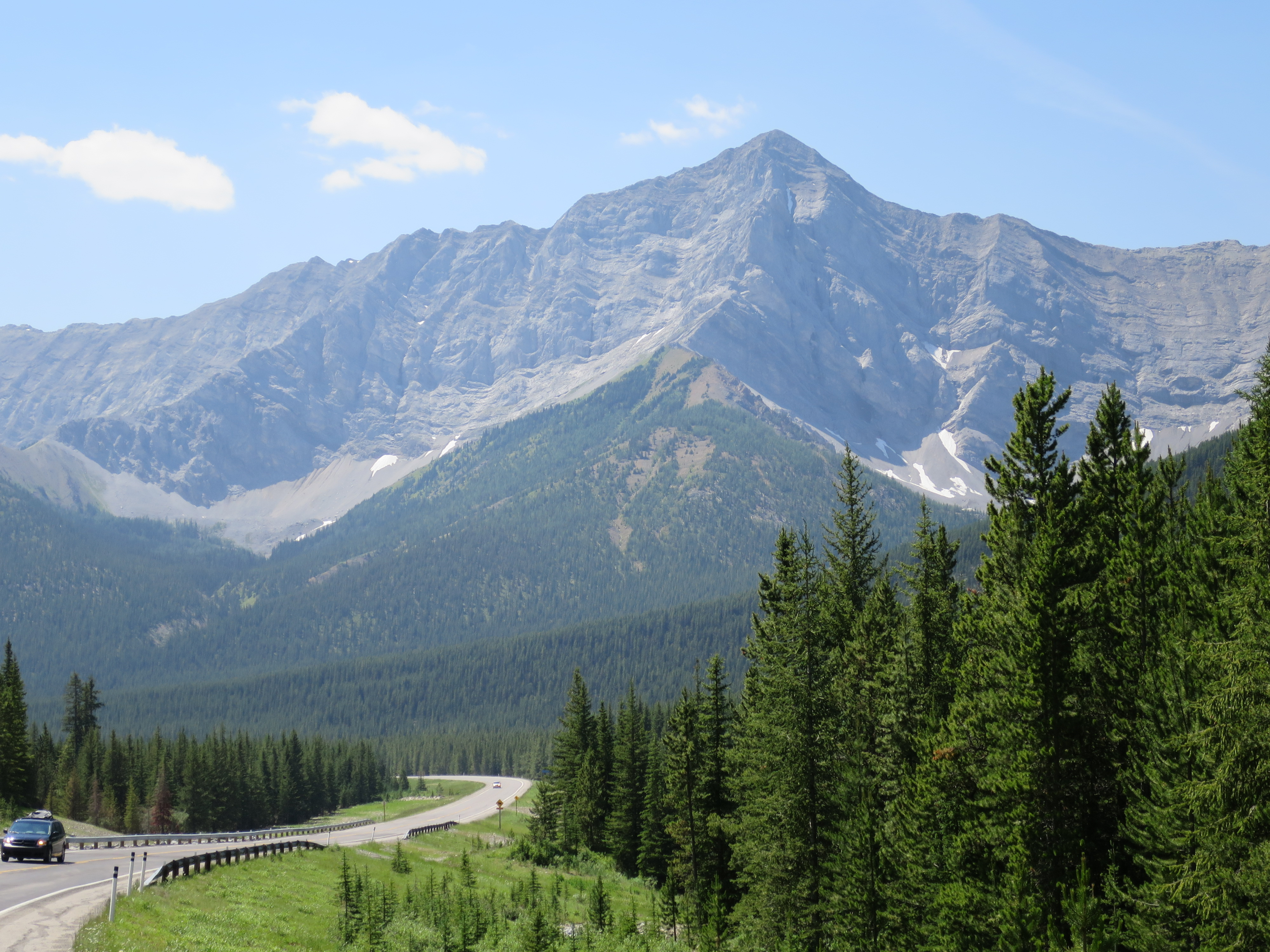
- Storelk Mountain from the Kananaskis Trail

Highest point
- Elevation: 2,871 m (9,419 ft)
- Prominence: 181 m (594 ft)
- Coordinates: 50°32′18″N 114°59′00″W

Geography
- Location within Alberta
- Location: Alberta; British Columbia
- Parent range: Elk Range
- Topo map: NTS 82J10 Mount Rae

Climbing
- First ascent: 1915 Interprovincial Boundary Commission
- Easiest route: Scrambling Routes

Storelk Mountain is located on the border of Alberta and British Columbia on the Continental Divide. It was named in 1915. The toponym is a portmanteau that combines "stor" and "elk", as the mountain is positioned between Storm Creek and Elk River.

== Geology ==
Storelk Mountain is composed of sedimentary rock laid down during the Precambrian to Jurassic periods. Formed in shallow seas, this sedimentary rock was pushed east and over the top of younger rock during the Laramide orogeny.

== See also ==
- List of peaks on the Alberta–British Columbia border
- Mountains of Alberta
- Mountains of British Columbia
