= Divergence Peak =

Mountain in the country of Canada

- Location within Alberta Location within British Columbia Location within Canada

Highest point
- Elevation: 2,827 m (9,275 ft)
- Prominence: 417 m (1,368 ft)
- Coordinates: 52°30′04″N 117°59′27″W

Geography
- Location: Alberta; British Columbia
- Parent range: Park Ranges
- Topo map: NTS 83C12 Athabasca Falls

Climbing
- First ascent: 1920 Interprovincial Boundary Commission

Divergence Peak is located on the border of Alberta and British Columbia. It was named in 1921 by Arthur O. Wheeler.

== See also ==
- List of peaks on the Alberta–British Columbia border
- Mountains of Alberta
- Mountains of British Columbia
