= Kishinena Peak =

Mountain in Alberta and British Columbia, Canada

- Location within Alberta Location within British Columbia Location within Canada

Highest point
- Elevation: 2,434 m (7,986 ft)
- Prominence: 300 m (980 ft)
- Coordinates: 49°07′35″N 114°09′30″W

Geography
- Location: Alberta; British Columbia
- Topo map: NTS 82G1 Sage Creek

Kishinena Peak is located on the border of Alberta and British Columbia on the Continental Divide. It was named in 1959.

== See also ==
- List of peaks on the Alberta–British Columbia border
- Mountains of Alberta
- Mountains of British Columbia
