= Mount Morkill =

Mountain in Alberta/British Columbia, Canada

- Location within Alberta Location within British Columbia Location within Canada

Highest point
- Elevation: 2,286 m (7,500 ft)
- Prominence: 337 m (1,106 ft)
- Listing: Mountains of Alberta; Mountains of British Columbia
- Coordinates: 53°41′42″N 119°50′27″W

Geography
- Country: Canada
- Provinces: Alberta and British Columbia
- Parent range: Front Ranges
- Topo map: NTS 83E12 Pauline Creek

Mount Morkill is located on the border of Alberta and British Columbia, near McBride which is a town in British Columbia, Canada. There is a subpeak to the southwest of the main peak, at an elevation of 2,185 m (7,169 ft) named The Gazetted Peak. It was named in 1965 after D.B. Morkill, a British Columbia land surveyor.

== See also ==
- List of peaks on the Alberta–British Columbia border
