= Cave Mountain =

Mountain in the country of Canada

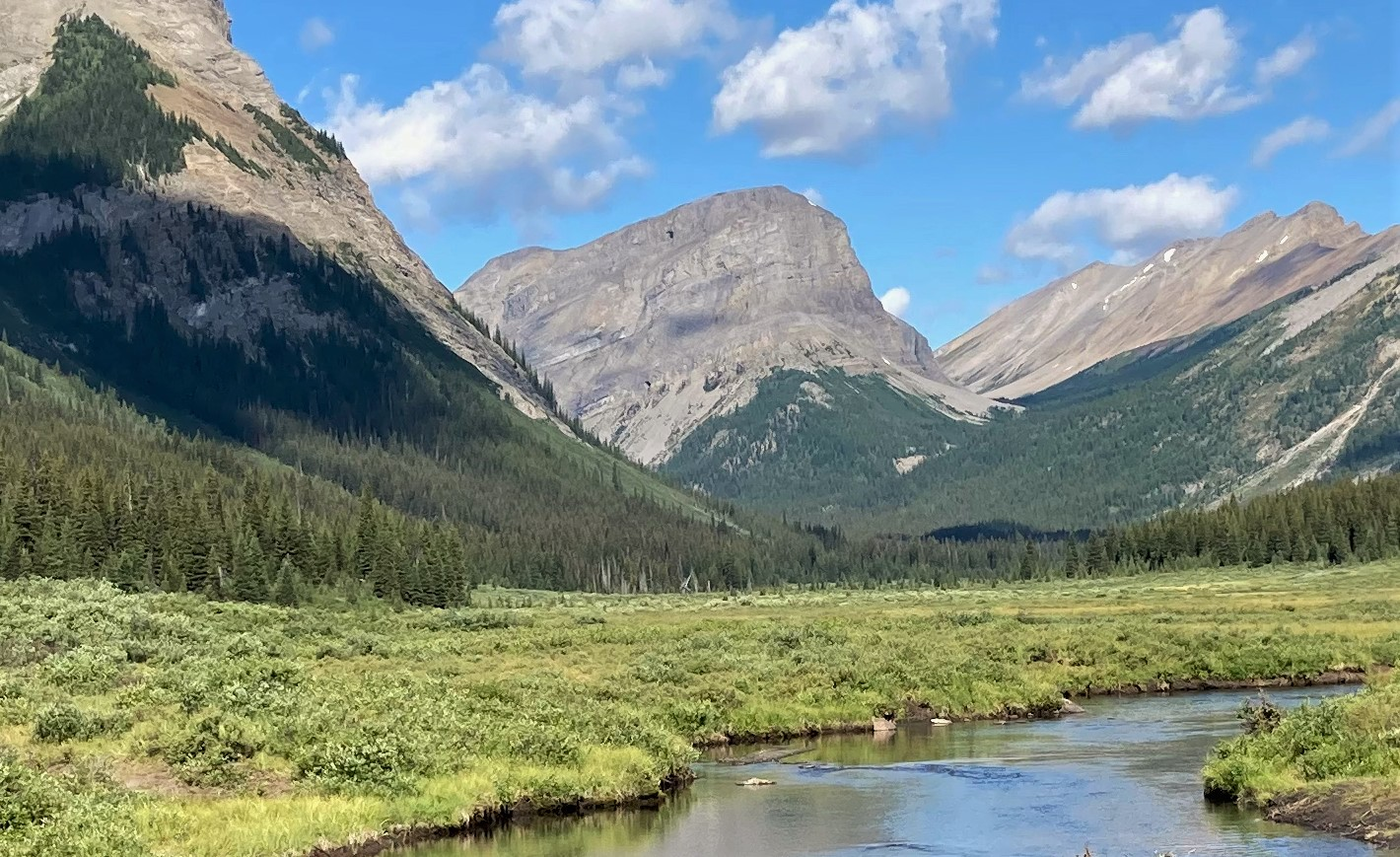
- Southeast aspect, centered

Highest point
- Elevation: 2,650 m (8,690 ft)
- Prominence: 330 m (1,080 ft)
- Coordinates: 50°56′15″N 115°35′44″W

Geography
- Location within Alberta Location within British Columbia Location within Canada
- Location: Alberta; British Columbia
- Protected area: Banff National Park
- Parent range: Canadian Rockies
- Topo map: NTS 82J13 Mount Assiniboine

Cave Mountain is located on the border of Alberta and British Columbia on the Continental Divide. It was named in 1916 by the International Boundary Survey. A cave within the mountain accounts for the name.

== Geology ==
Cave Mountain is composed of sedimentary rock laid down during the Precambrian to Jurassic periods. Formed in shallow seas, this sedimentary rock was pushed east and over the top of younger rock during the Laramide orogeny.

== Climate ==
Based on the Köppen climate classification, Cave Mountain is located in a subarctic climate zone with cold, snowy winters, and mild summers. Winter temperatures can drop below −20 °C with wind chill factors below −30 °C. The months of July through September offer the most favorable weather for climbing this peak.

== See also ==
- List of peaks on the Alberta–British Columbia border
- Mountains of Alberta
- Mountains of British Columbia
