= Og Mountain =

Mountain in Alberta and British Columbia, Canada

- Location within Alberta Location within British Columbia Location within Canada

Highest point
- Elevation: 2,874 m (9,429 ft)
- Prominence: 173 m (568 ft) (Note: Based on a summit elevation of 2,863 m)
- Listing: Mountains of Alberta; Mountains of British Columbia
- Coordinates: 50°57′32″N 115°36′05″W

Geography
- Country: Canada
- Provinces: Alberta and British Columbia
- Protected areas: Banff National Park; Mount Assiniboine Provincial Park
- Parent range: Canadian Rockies
- Topo map: NTS 82J13 Mount Assiniboine

Og Mountain is located north of Assiniboine Pass and straddles the Continental Divide marking the Alberta-British Columbia border. It was named in 1966 after references in the Bible.

== See also ==
- List of peaks on the Alberta–British Columbia border
