= Mount Leval =

Mountain in Alberta and British Columbia, Canada

- Location within Alberta Location within British Columbia Location within Canada

Highest point
- Elevation: 2,713 m (8,901 ft)
- Prominence: 263 m (863 ft)
- Parent peak: Mount Vavasour (2835 m)
- Listing: Mountains of Alberta; Mountains of British Columbia
- Coordinates: 50°45′23″N 115°26′15″W

Geography
- Country: Canada
- Provinces: Alberta and British Columbia
- Parent range: Blue Range
- Topo map: NTS 82J14 Spray Lakes Reservoir

Mount Leval is located on the border of Alberta and British Columbia on the Continental Divide. It was named in 1918 after Gaston de Leval, a Belgian lawyer who unsuccessfully defended Edith Cavell, a British nurse. Cavell was caught helping Allied soldiers escape in German-occupied Belgium during World War I. She was tried for treason under German military law and executed by firing squad in 1915.

== See also ==
- List of peaks on the British Columbia–Alberta border
