= Lick Peak =

Mountain in Canada

- Location within Alberta Location within British Columbia Location within Canada

Highest point
- Elevation: 2,862 m (9,390 ft)
- Prominence: 331 m (1,086 ft)
- Coordinates: 52°26′48″N 117°54′54″W

Geography
- Location: Alberta; British Columbia
- Parent range: Park Ranges
- Topo map: NTS 83C5 Fortress Lake

Climbing
- First ascent: 1979 D. Waterman

Lick Peak is located on the border of Alberta and British Columbia. It was named in 1921 by Arthur Oliver Wheeler, a prominent Canadian mountaineer, engineer, and first president of the Alpine Club of Canada.

== See also ==
- List of peaks on the British Columbia–Alberta border
- Mountains of Alberta
- Mountains of British Columbia
