= Aye Mountain =

Mountain in Western Canada

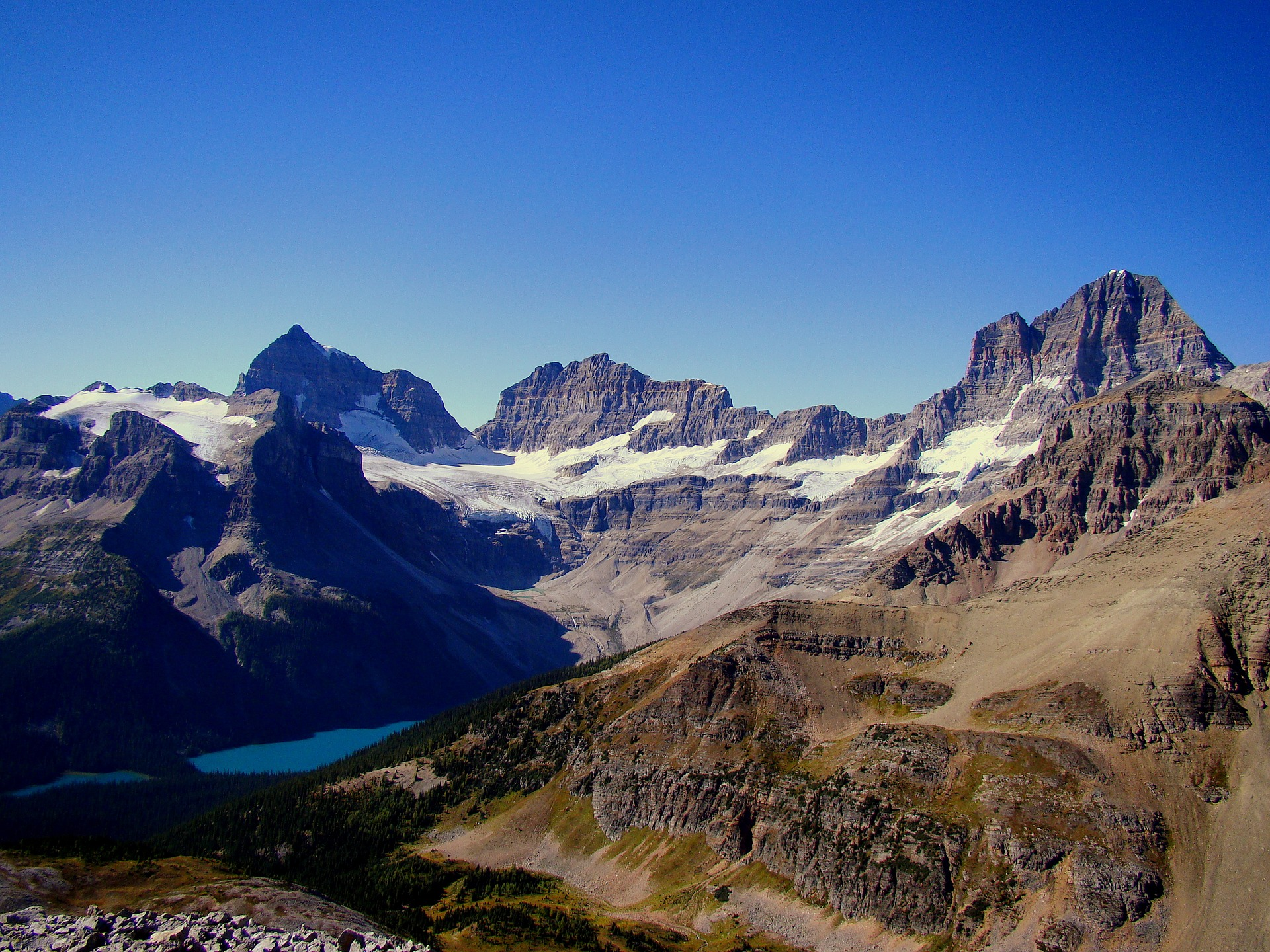
- Aye Mountain centered. Eon to left, Assiniboine to right

Highest point
- Elevation: 3,243 m (10,640 ft)
- Prominence: 361 m (1,184 ft)
- Parent peak: Lunette Peak (3428 m)
- Listing: Mountains of Alberta; Mountains of British Columbia
- Coordinates: 50°50′40″N 115°38′35″W

Geography
- Location within Alberta Location within British Columbia Location within Canada
- Country: Canada
- Provinces: Alberta and British Columbia
- Topo map: NTS 82J13 Mount Assiniboine

Climbing
- First ascent: 1934 H.S. Crosby, Rudolph Aemmer

Aye Mountain is located on the Canadian provincial boundary between Alberta and British Columbia on the Continental Divide. It was named in 1913 by the Interprovincial Boundary Survey.

== Geology ==
The mountain is composed of sedimentary rock laid down during the Precambrian to Jurassic periods. Formed in shallow seas, this sedimentary rock was pushed east and over the top of younger rock during the Laramide orogeny.

== Climate ==
Based on the Köppen climate classification, Mount Aye is located in a subarctic climate with cold, snowy winters, and mild summers. Temperatures can drop below −20 C with wind chill factors below −30 C.

== See also ==
- List of peaks on the British Columbia–Alberta border
