= Drawbridge Peak =

Mountain in the country of Canada

- Location within Alberta Location within British Columbia Location within Canada

Highest point
- Elevation: 2,733 m (8,967 ft)
- Prominence: 184 m (604 ft)
- Coordinates: 52°42′13″N 118°19′34″W

Geography
- Location: Alberta / British Columbia
- Parent range: Park Ranges
- Topo map: NTS 83D9 Amethyst Lakes

Drawbridge Peak is located on the Continental Divide along the provincial borders of Alberta and British Columbia. The Alberta side is in Jasper National Park while Mount Robson Provincial Park is on the B.C. side. It was named in 1920 by the Interprovincial Boundary Survey.

== See also ==
- List of peaks on the Alberta–British Columbia border
- Mountains of Alberta
- Mountains of British Columbia
