= Phillipps Peak =

Mountain on border of Alberta and British Columbia in Canada

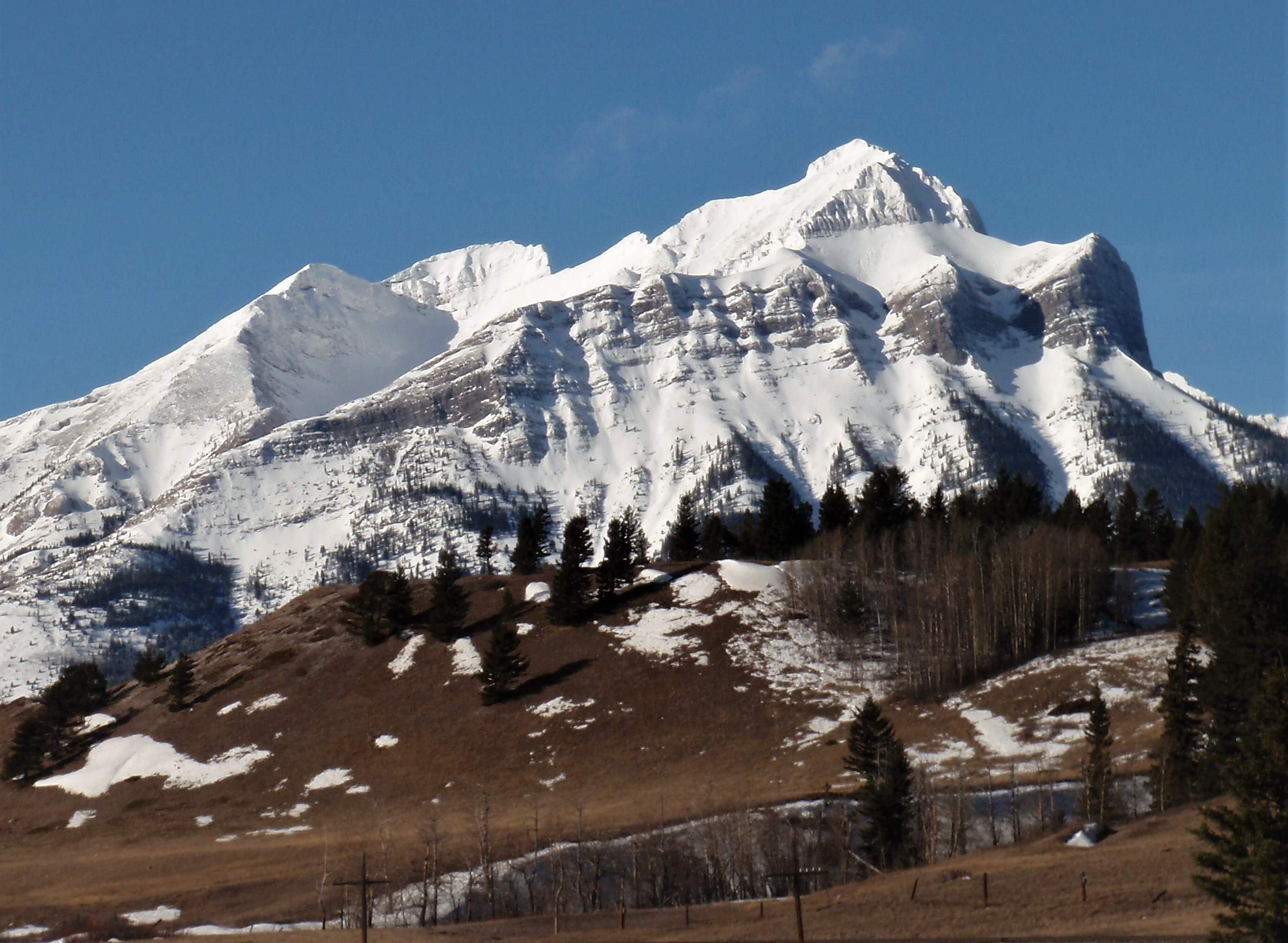
- Phillipps Peak visible to the left behind Mount Tecumseh

Highest point
- Elevation: 2,500 m (8,200 ft)
- Listing: Mountains of Alberta; Mountains of British Columbia
- Coordinates: 49°39′47″N 114°39′26″W

Geography
- Location within Alberta Location within British Columbia Location within Canada
- Country: Canada
- Provinces: Alberta and British Columbia
- Parent range: High Rock Range
- Topo map: NTS 82G10 Crowsnest

Phillipps Peak is located north of Crowsnest Pass and straddles the Continental Divide marking the Alberta-British Columbia border. It was named in 1915 after Michael Phillipps who in 1873 was the first white man to cross Crowsnest Pass. It is the lower west peak of Mount Tecumseh.

== Geology ==
Phillipps Peak is composed of sedimentary rock laid down during the Precambrian to Jurassic periods. Formed in shallow seas, this sedimentary rock was initially uplifted beginning 170 million years ago when the Lewis Overthrust fault pushed an enormous slab of precambrian rocks 3 mi (4.8 km) thick, 50 miles (80 km) wide and 160 miles (260 km) long over younger rock of the cretaceous period during the Laramide orogeny.

== Climate ==
Based on the Köppen climate classification, Phillipps Peak has an alpine subarctic climate with cold, snowy winters, and mild summers. Temperatures can drop below −20 °C with wind chill factors below −30 °C.

== See also ==
- List of peaks on the Alberta–British Columbia border
