= Rainy Ridge =

Mountain in the country of Canada

- Location within Alberta Location within British Columbia Location within Canada

Highest point
- Elevation: 2,464 m (8,084 ft)
- Prominence: 215 m (705 ft)
- Listing: Mountains of Alberta; Mountains of British Columbia
- Coordinates: 49°14′51″N 114°22′48″W

Geography
- Country: Canada
- Provinces: Alberta and British Columbia
- Parent range: Flathead Range
- Topo maps: NTS 82G8 Beaver Mines; NTS 82G1 Sage Creek

Rainy Ridge is a ridge located on the Eastern side of Middle Kootenay Pass and straddles the Continental Divide marking the Alberta-British Columbia border. It was named in 1958 but the origin of the name is unknown.

== See also ==
- List of peaks on the Alberta–British Columbia border
