= Citadel Peak =

Mountain in the country of Canada

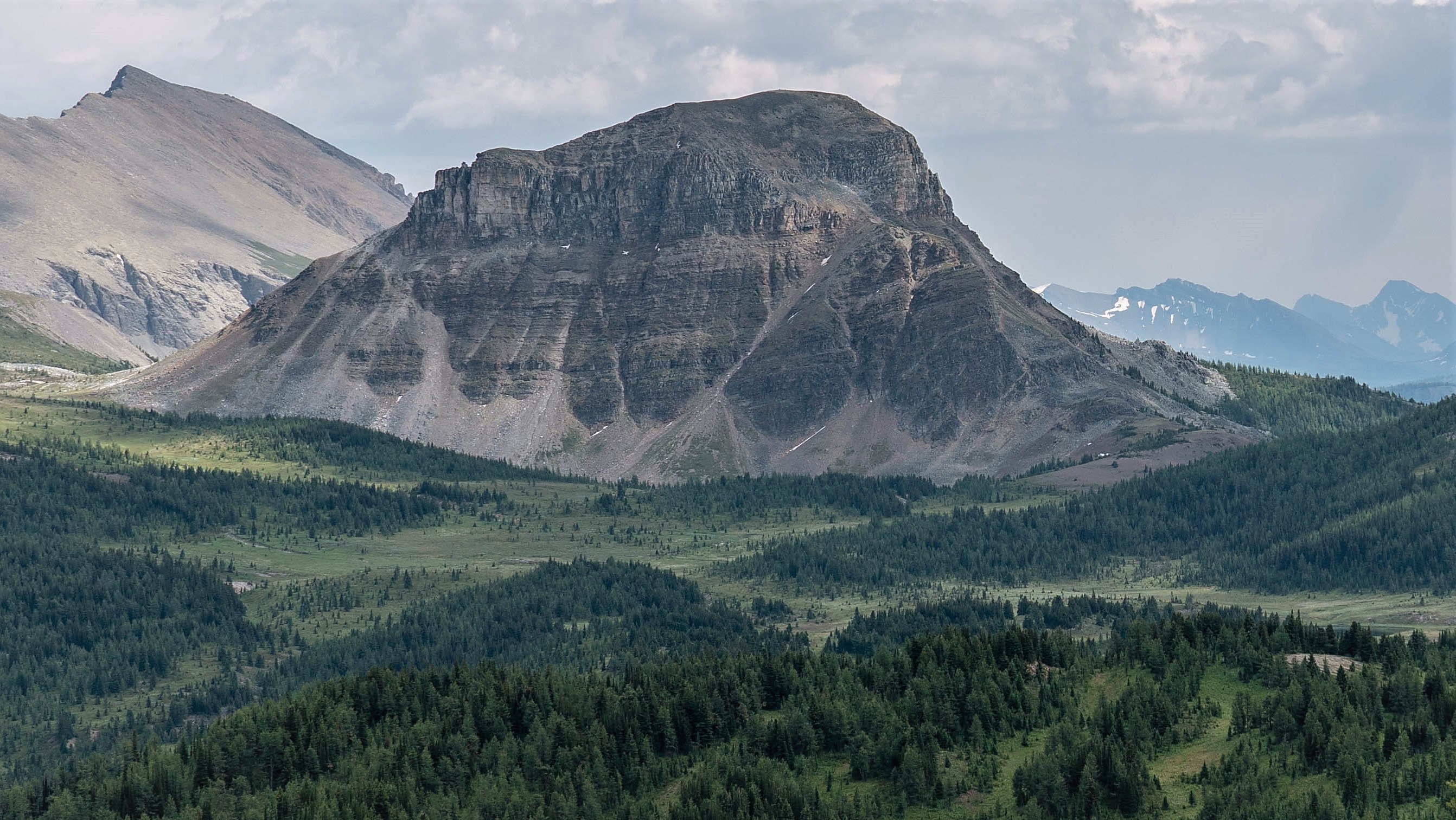
- Northwest aspect

Highest point
- Elevation: 2,625 m (8,612 ft)
- Prominence: 248 m (814 ft)
- Coordinates: 51°00′59″N 115°43′08″W

Geography
- Location within Alberta Location within British Columbia Location within Canada
- Country: Canada
- Province: Alberta / British Columbia
- Protected area: Banff National Park / Mount Assiniboine Provincial Park
- Parent range: Canadian Rockies
- Topo map: NTS 82O4 Banff

Citadel Peak is located on the border of Alberta and British Columbia on the Continental Divide. It was named in 1913 by Arthur O. Wheeler.

== Geology ==
Citadel Peak is composed of sedimentary rock laid down during the Precambrian to Jurassic periods. Formed in shallow seas, this sedimentary rock was pushed east and over the top of younger rock during the Laramide orogeny.

== Climate ==
Based on the Köppen climate classification, Citadel Peak is located in a subarctic climate zone with cold, snowy winters, and mild summers. Winter temperatures can drop below −20 °C with wind chill factors below −30 °C.

== See also ==
- List of peaks on the Alberta–British Columbia border
- Mountains of Alberta
- Mountains of British Columbia
