= Elephas Mountain =

Mountain in the country of Canada

- Location within Alberta Location within British Columbia Location within Canada

Highest point
- Elevation: 2,978 m (9,770 ft)
- Prominence: 328 m (1,076 ft)
- Listing: Mountains of Alberta; Mountains of British Columbia
- Coordinates: 52°35′47″N 118°18′37″W

Geography
- Country: Canada
- Provinces: Alberta and British Columbia
- Parent range: Park Ranges
- Topo map: NTS 83D9 Amethyst Lakes

Climbing
- First ascent: 1933 by H. Burns, O. Haw, C.C. Wates, W.J. Watson

Elephas Mountain is located on the border of Alberta and British Columbia. It was named in 1922 by Arthur O. Wheeler for its resemblance to an elephant's head; Elephas is the Latin word for elephant.

== See also ==
- List of peaks on the British Columbia–Alberta border
