= Miette Hill =

Hill in Alberta and British Columbia, Canada

- Location within Alberta Location within British Columbia Location within Canada

Highest point
- Elevation: 2,378 m (7,802 ft)
- Prominence: 219 m (719 ft)
- Coordinates: 52°50′51″N 118°23′02″W

Geography
- Location: Alberta; British Columbia
- Topo map: NTS 83D16 Jasper

Miette Hill is located on the border of Alberta and British Columbia. It was named for Bonhomme Miette, a figure in French Canadian folklore.

== See also ==
- List of peaks on the Alberta–British Columbia border
- Mountains of Alberta
- Mountains of British Columbia
