= Quartz Hill (Canada) =

Hill in Alberta and British Columbia, Canada

- Location within Alberta Location within British Columbia Location within Canada

Highest point
- Elevation: 2,580 m (8,460 ft)
- Prominence: 278 m (912 ft)
- Parent peak: Mount Howard Douglas
- Listing: Mountains of Alberta; Mountains of British Columbia
- Coordinates: 51°02′11″N 115°45′43″W

Geography
- Country: Canada
- Provinces: Alberta and British Columbia
- District: Kootenay Land District
- Protected areas: Banff National Park; Mount Assiniboine Provincial Park
- Parent range: Park Ranges
- Topo map: NTS 82O4 Banff

Quartz Hill is located on the NE side of Mount Assiniboine Provincial Park along the Continental Divide marking the Alberta/British Columbia border. It is so named due to the top of the mountain is mostly quartz.

== See also ==
- List of peaks on the Alberta–British Columbia border
