= Mount Gloria =

Canadian mountain

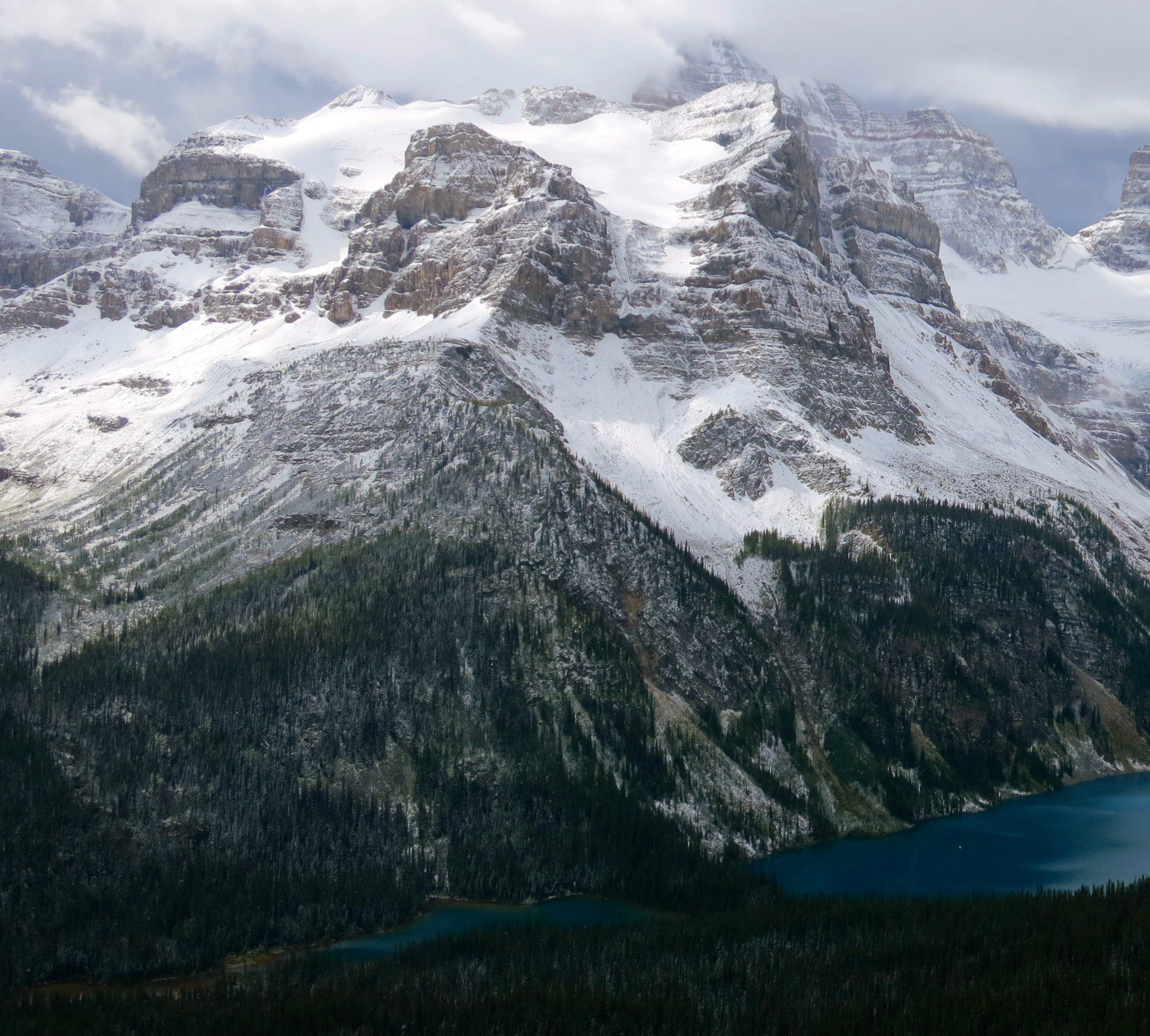
- Mount Gloria

Highest point
- Elevation: 2,908 m (9,541 ft)
- Prominence: 189 m (620 ft)
- Parent peak: Eon Mountain (3305 m)
- Listing: Mountains of Alberta; Mountains of British Columbia
- Coordinates: 50°50′45″N 115°36′27″W

Geography
- Location within Alberta Location within British Columbia Location within Canada
- Country: Canada
- Provinces: Alberta and British Columbia
- Parent range: Park Ranges
- Topo map: NTS 82J13 Mount Assiniboine

Climbing
- First ascent: 1929 E. Bigelow, F.X. Bigelow, H. Bigelow, H.B. Bigelow, C. Baldwin, S. Detty, G. Duffy, R. Hallowell, H.Howe, C. Saltonstall, R. Saltonstall, R. Walcott, C. Coyteaux.

Mount Gloria is located on the border of Alberta and British Columbia on the Continental Divide in Canada. It was named in 1913 by the Interprovincial Boundary Survey after Lake Gloria which lies directly north of the mountain.

== Geology ==
The mountain is composed of sedimentary rock laid down during the Precambrian to Jurassic periods. Formed in shallow seas, this sedimentary rock was pushed east and over the top of younger rock during the Laramide orogeny.

== Climate ==
Based on the Köppen climate classification, Mount Gloria is located in a subarctic climate with cold, snowy winters, and mild summers. Temperatures can drop below −20 °C with wind chill factors below −30 °C.

== See also ==
- List of peaks on the British Columbia–Alberta border
