= Bingley Peak =

Mountain in Alberta and British Columbia, Canada

- Location within Alberta Location within British Columbia Location within Canada

Highest point
- Elevation: 2,438 m (7,999 ft)
- Coordinates: 52°52′55″N 118°37′20″W

Geography
- Location: Alberta; British Columbia
- Topo map: NTS 83D15 Lucerne

Bingley Peak is located on the border of Alberta and British Columbia. It was named in 1863 by Walter Cheadle.

== See also ==
- List of peaks on the Alberta–British Columbia border
- Mountains of Alberta
- Mountains of British Columbia
