= Mount Cautley =

Mountain on the Alberta/British Columbia boundary in Canada

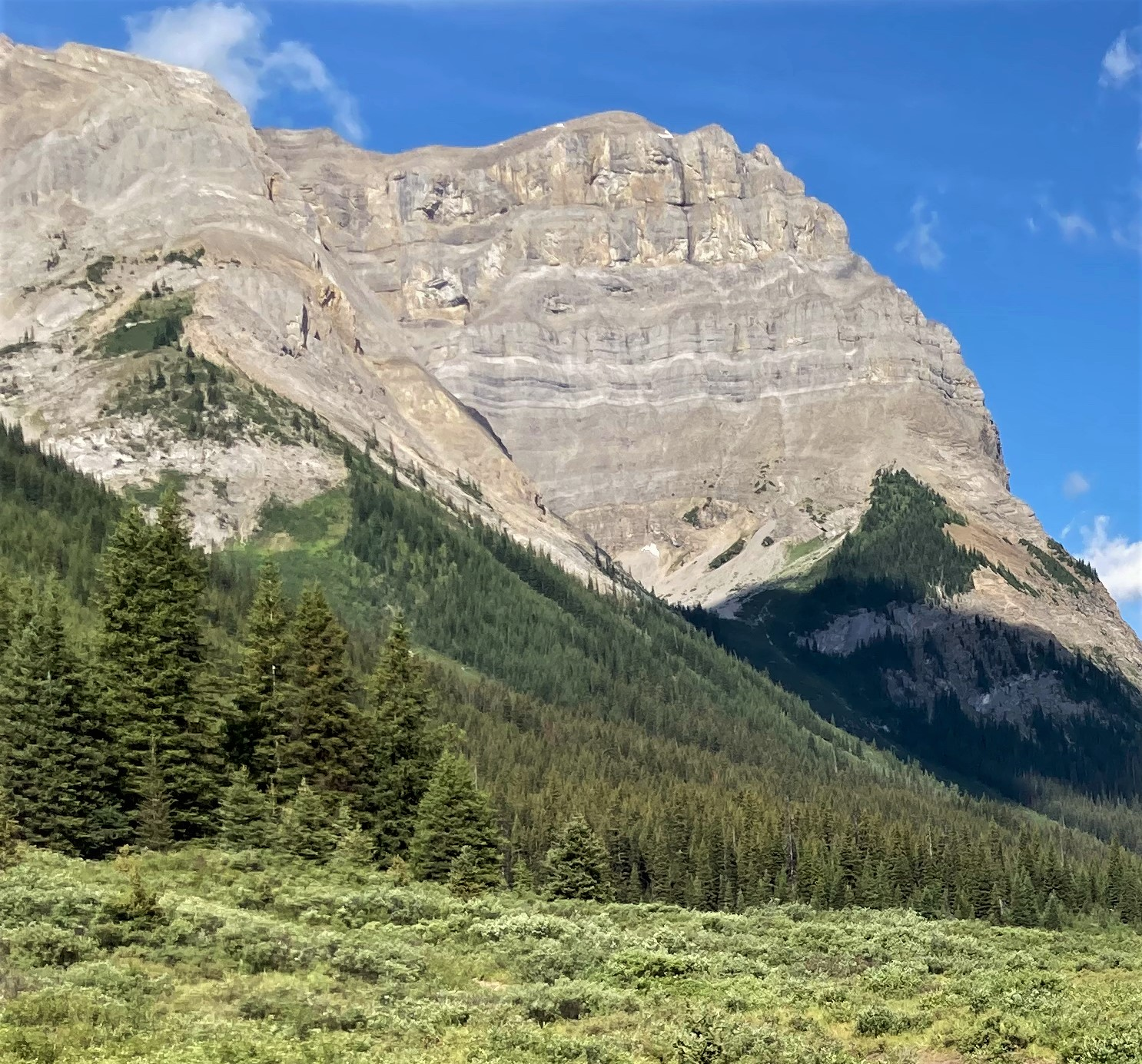
- Southeast aspect of Mount Cautley / Gibralter Rock

Highest point
- Elevation: 2,880 m (9,450 ft)
- Prominence: 495 m (1,624 ft) (Note: Based on a summit elevation of 2,870 m.)
- Listing: Mountains of Alberta; Mountains of British Columbia
- Coordinates: 50°54′28″N 115°34′21″W

Geography
- Location within Alberta Location within British Columbia Location within Canada
- Country: Canada
- Provinces: Alberta and British Columbia
- Protected areas: Banff National Park; Mount Assiniboine Provincial Park
- Parent range: Continental Ranges
- Topo map: NTS 82J13 Mount Assiniboine

Mount Cautley is located on the border of Alberta and British Columbia on the Continental Divide, SE of Assiniboine Pass. Richard W. Cautley was a surveyor from Ipswich, England. As part of the Alberta/British Columbia Boundary Commission, his party was in charge of mapping precise boundaries in the usable mountain passes of the Canadian Rockies.

== See also ==
- List of peaks on the Alberta–British Columbia border
