= Kakwa Mountain =

Mountain in Alberta and British Columbia, Canada

- Location within Alberta Location within British Columbia Location within Canada

Highest point
- Elevation: 2,295 m (7,530 ft)
- Prominence: 659 m (2,162 ft)
- Coordinates: 54°04′38″N 119°59′50″W

Geography
- Location: Alberta; British Columbia
- Parent range: Front Ranges
- Topo map: NTS 83L4 Kakwa Falls

Kakwa Mountain is located on the border of Alberta and British Columbia. It was named in 1925 by Samuel P. Fay, after the Cree word for "porcupine".

== See also ==
- List of peaks on the Alberta–British Columbia border
- Mountains of Alberta
- Mountains of British Columbia
