= Lucerne Peak =

Mountain in the country of Canada

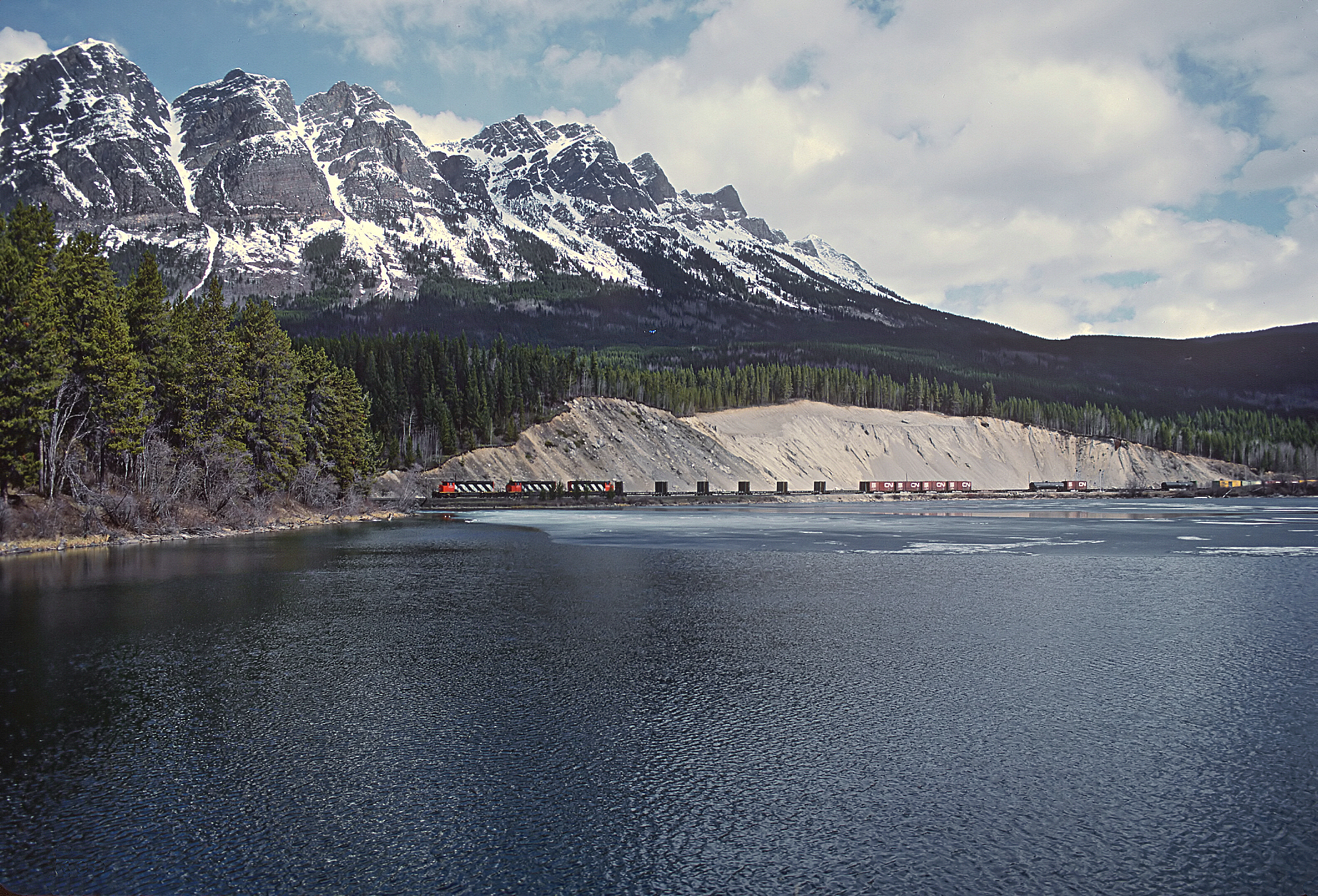
- South aspect

Highest point
- Elevation: 2,412 m (7,913 ft)
- Coordinates: 52°53′00″N 118°34′30″W

Geography
- Location within Alberta Location within British Columbia Location within Canada
- Interactive map of Lucerne Peak
- Location: Alberta; British Columbia
- Topo map: NTS 83D15 Lucerne

Lucerne Peak is located on the border of Alberta and British Columbia; on the continental divide, and is one of the peaks of Yellowhead Mountain. It was named by Arthur O. Wheeler after the railway town located at the mountain's base.

When the Canadian Northern Pacific Railway reached Yellowhead Lake in 1913, it named the station there after Lucerne, Switzerland. A small town developed. For a time it had a population approaching three hundred and rivaled Jasper. In 1924 the "railway divisional point" moved from Lucerne to Jasper and many of the residents relocated to Jasper. Lucerne's railway station was demolished after the Second World War.

== Climate ==
Based on the Köppen climate classification, Lucerne Peak is located in a subarctic climate zone with cold, snowy winters, and mild summers. Winter temperatures can drop below -20 °C with wind chill factors below -30 °C.

== Gallery ==
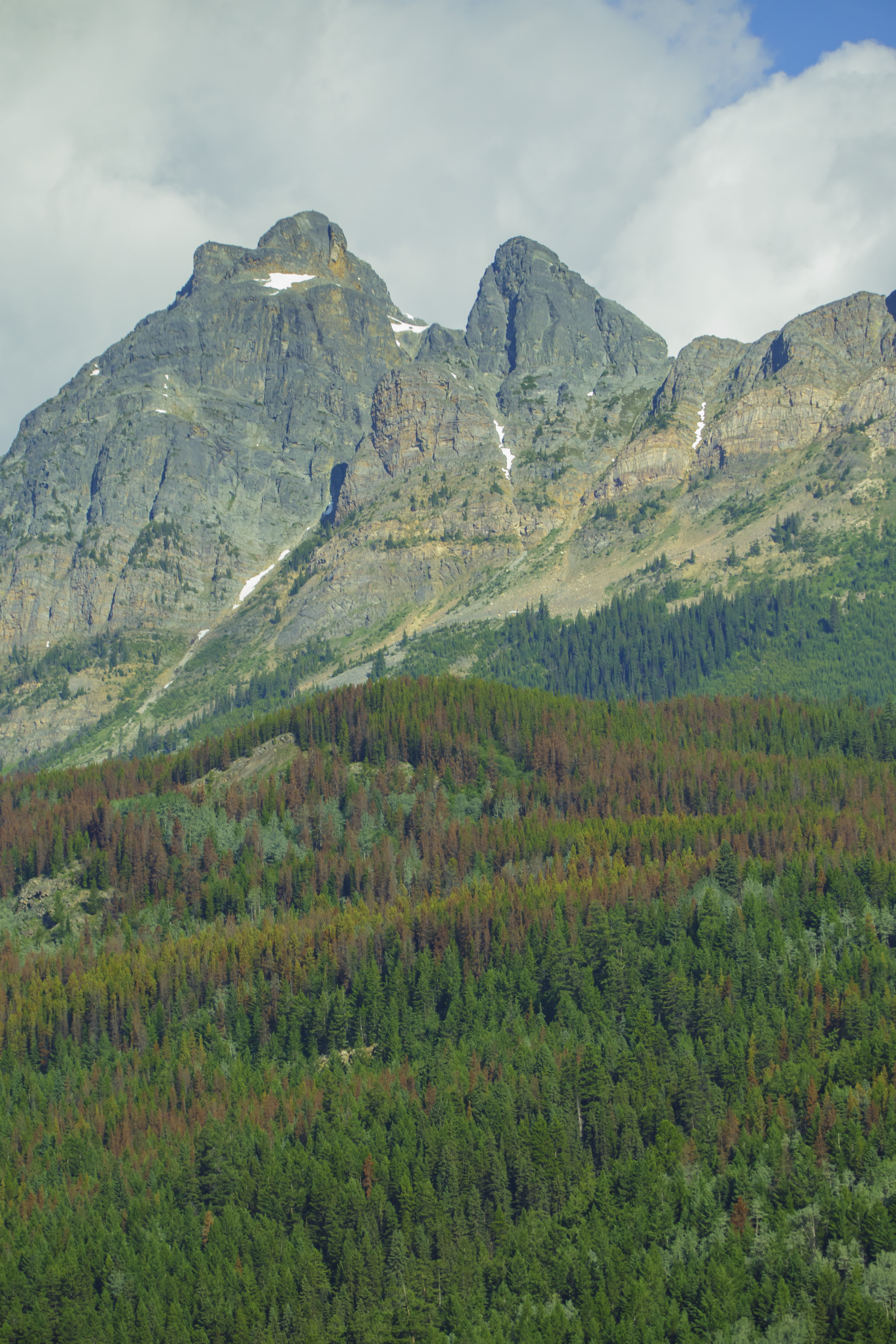
Lucerne Peak

== See also ==
- List of peaks on the Alberta–British Columbia border
- Mountains of Alberta
- Mountains of British Columbia
