= Mount Maude (Canada) =

Mountain in the country of Canada

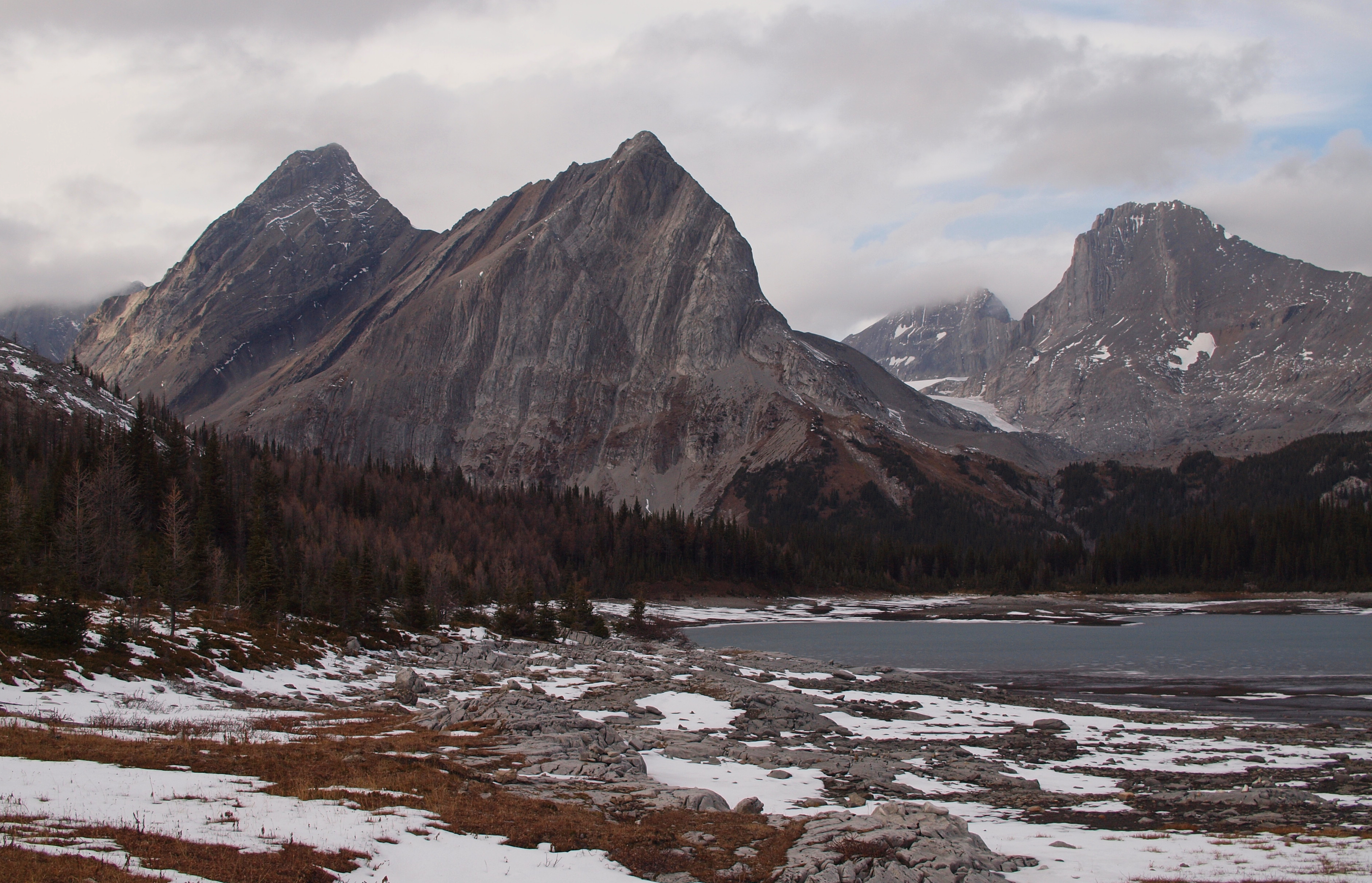
- Mount Maude (left) seen from Turbine Canyon

Highest point
- Elevation: 3,043 m (9,984 ft)
- Prominence: 330 m (1,080 ft)
- Listing: Mountains of Alberta; Mountains of British Columbia
- Coordinates: 50°42′02″N 115°18′10″W

Geography
- Location within Alberta Location within British Columbia Location within Canada
- Country: Canada
- Provinces: Alberta and British Columbia
- Topo map: NTS 82J11 Kananaskis Lakes

Climbing
- First ascent: 1922 E.W. Crawford, G.R. Adams, M.D. Geddes, W. Gillespie, N.D.B. Hendrie, M.K.P, Hendrie, J.B. Wilcox, Rudolph Aemmer

Mount Maude is a mountain located on the border of Alberta and British Columbia on the Continental Divide. It was named in 1918 after Lieutenant General Sir Frederick Stanley Maude. Maude was a British commander who captured Baghdad during World War I. This mountain was first ascended in 1922 by G.R. Adams.

== Overview ==
It has an average elevation of 2,868 m (9,409 ft) above sea level. The land area is not cultivated and most of the natural vegetation is still intact. The climate is classified as humid continental (humid with severe winter, no dry season with a polar desert biozone). This mountain can be ascended by hiking and route finding, however, it is very icy at parts. Mount Maude currently has no inhabitants. However, the nearest town, Kananaskis Village, has a population of 50,000, and is approximately seven hours away by public transportation.

== Climate ==
Mount Maude has distinct cold and warm seasons. July is usually the warmest month, with an average temperature of 13.9 °C (57.0 °F) and typically sunny skies. In contrast, January is the coldest month, with an average temperature of −20 °C (−4 °F) at night. Earthquakes are experienced, on average, once every 50 years on Mount Maude ranking a 5/6 on the Richter Scale. This means that people living in the area will feel the quake and damage will be slight.

== Gallery ==
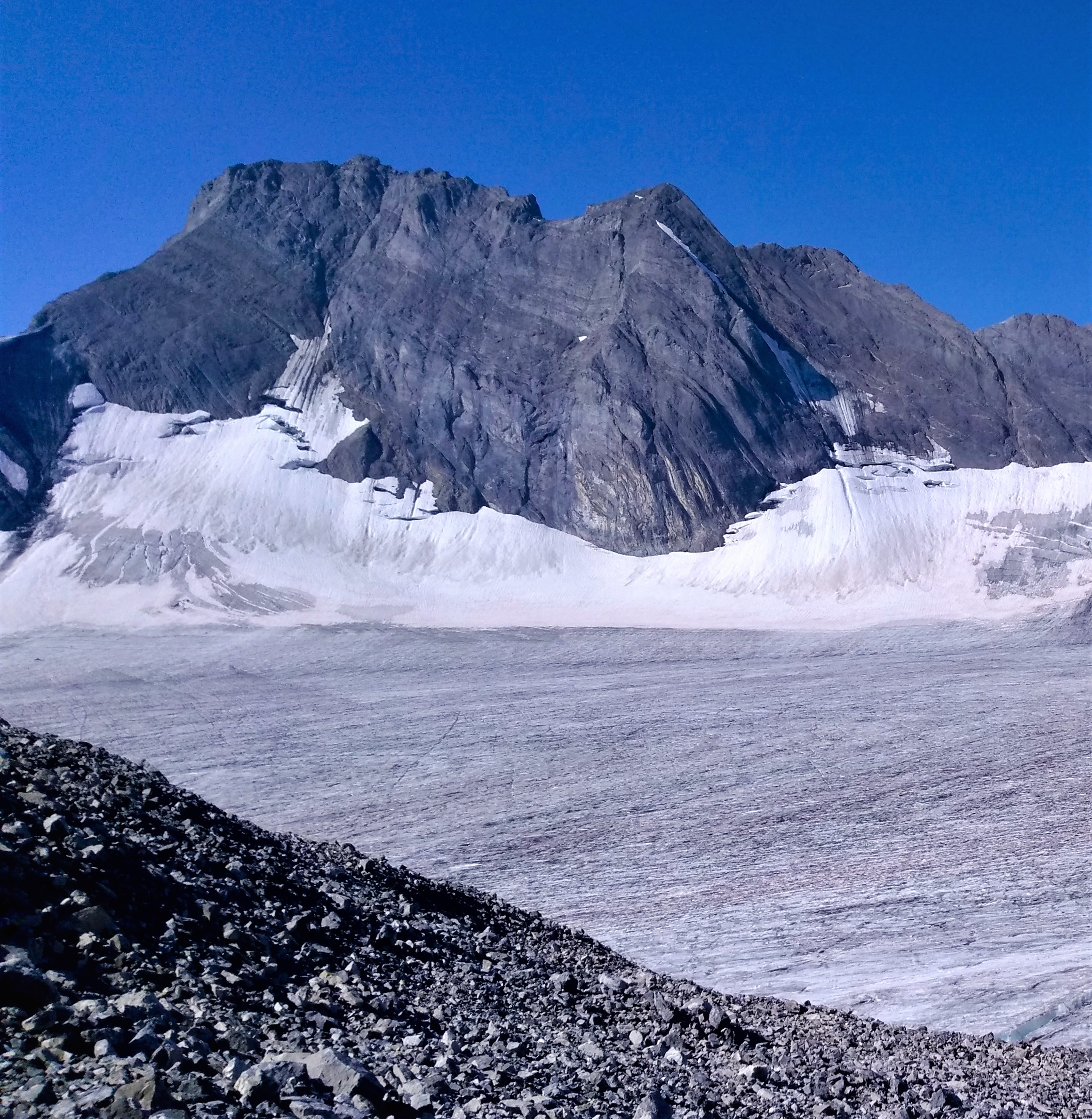
North aspect of Mt. Maude with Haig Glacier

== See also ==
- List of peaks on the Alberta–British Columbia border
