= Triad Peak =

Mountain in Alberta and British Columbia, Canada

- Location within Alberta Location within British Columbia Location within Canada

Highest point
- Elevation: 3,048 m (10,000 ft)
- Prominence: 198 m (650 ft)
- Parent peak: Omega Peak (3060 m)
- Listing: Mountains of Alberta; Mountains of British Columbia
- Coordinates: 52°07′42″N 117°33′28″W

Geography
- Country: Canada
- Provinces: Alberta and British Columbia
- Parent range: Park Ranges
- Topo map: NTS 83C4 Clemenceau Icefield

Climbing
- First ascent: 1936 E. Cromwell, E. Cromwell jr., F.S. North, J. Monroe Thorington

Triad Peak is a mountain located on the border of Alberta and British Columbia, Canada. It lies very close to the continental divide at the head of the Athabasca River valley near Jasper National Park. Major headwaters are the Athabasca and Columbia rivers.

A "triad" is a group of three. The mountain was first ascended in 1936 by E. Cromwell, E. Cromwell jr., F.S. North, J. Monroe (Thorington Journal reference AAJ 3-61). It was named in 1936.

== See also ==
- List of peaks on the British Columbia–Alberta border
