= Mount Machray =

Mountain in Alberta and British Columbia, Canada

- Location within Alberta Location within British Columbia Location within Canada

Highest point
- Elevation: 2,749 m (9,019 ft)
- Prominence: 404 m (1,325 ft)
- Listing: Mountains of Alberta; Mountains of British Columbia
- Coordinates: 53°02′51″N 118°46′39″W

Geography
- Country: Canada
- Provinces: Alberta and British Columbia
- District: Cariboo Land District
- Parent range: Park Ranges
- Topo map: NTS 83E2 Resplendent Creek

Mount Machray is located on the western side of Grant Pass, NE side of Mount Robson Provincial Park on the Continental Divide marking the Alberta-British Columbia border. It was named in 1923 after Robert Machray, Archbishop of Rupert's Land.

== See also ==
- List of peaks on the Alberta–British Columbia border
