= Scarp Mountain =

Mountain in Alberta and British Columbia, Canada

- Location within Alberta Location within British Columbia Location within Canada

Highest point
- Elevation: 3,000 m (9,800 ft)
- Prominence: 317 m (1,040 ft)
- Parent peak: Mount Fraser (3313 m)
- Listing: Mountains of Alberta; Mountains of British Columbia
- Coordinates: 52°37′59″N 118°21′21″W

Geography
- Country: Canada
- Provinces: Alberta and British Columbia
- Protected areas: Jasper National Park; Mount Robson Provincial Park
- Parent range: Park Ranges
- Topo map: NTS 83D9 Amethyst Lakes

Climbing
- First ascent: 1933 Rex Gibson, E.R. Woolf

Scarp Mountain is located on the border of Alberta and British Columbia, at the southern end of Mount Robson Provincial Park. It was named in 1922 by Arthur O. Wheeler.

== See also ==
- List of peaks on the British Columbia–Alberta border
