= Farbus Mountain =

Mountain in Banff NP, Canada

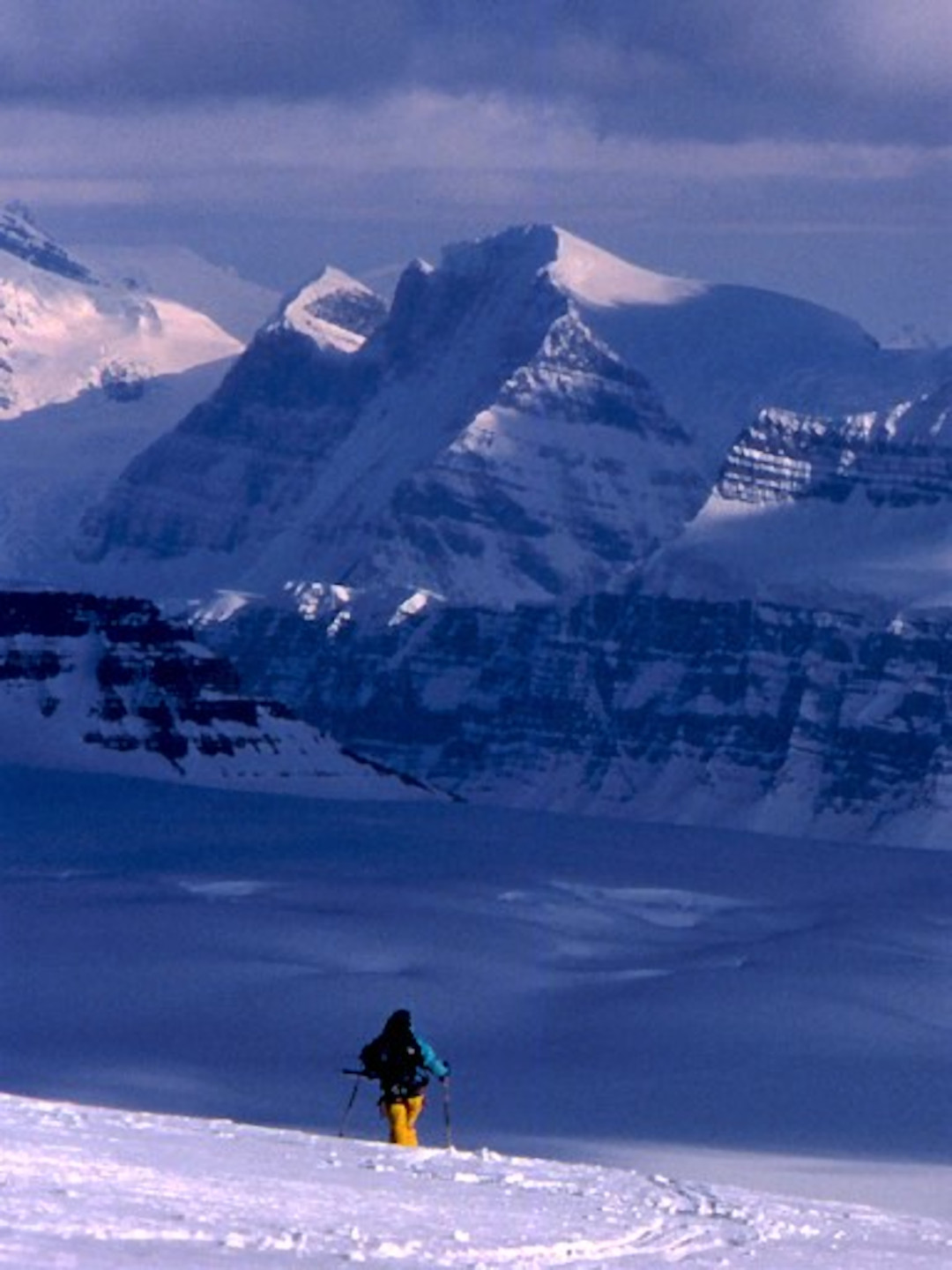
- Farbus Mtn. (left) from the Columbia Icefield

Highest point
- Elevation: 3,205 m (10,515 ft)
- Prominence: 205 m (673 ft)
- Parent peak: Mount Lyell 3498 m
- Listing: Mountains of Alberta
- Coordinates: 51°57′57″N 117°07′54″W

Geography
- Location within Alberta Location within British Columbia Location within Canada
- Country: Canada
- Provinces: Alberta and British Columbia
- National Park: Banff
- Parent range: Continental Ranges
- Topo map: NTS 82N14 Rostrum Peak

Climbing
- First ascent: 1937 S.B. Hendricks, Rex Gibson

Farbus Mountain is located on the provincial border of Alberta and British Columbia in Banff National Park. It was named in 1918 after Farbus, a village on the eastern slopes of Vimy Ridge in France. In the Battle of Vimy Ridge, Canadian troops retook Farbus from German control on April 9, 1917 as part of securing the Brown Line objective.

== See also ==
- List of peaks on the Alberta–British Columbia border
- Mountains of British Columbia
