= Interpass Ridge =

Mountain in the country of Canada

- Location within Alberta Location within British Columbia Location within Canada

Highest point
- Elevation: 2,301 m (7,549 ft)
- Prominence: 708 m (2,323 ft)
- Coordinates: 53°36′34″N 119°56′00″W

Geography
- Location: Alberta; British Columbia
- Parent range: Morkill Ranges
- Topo map: NTS 83E12 Pauline Creek

Interpass Ridge is located on the border of Alberta and British Columbia. It was named in 1924 by the Interprovincial Boundary Survey. It connects Avalanche Pass and Beaverdam Pass.

== See also ==
- List of peaks on the Alberta–British Columbia border
- Mountains of Alberta
- Mountains of British Columbia
