= Breaker Mountain =

Mountain in Canada

- Location within Alberta Location within British Columbia Location within Canada

Highest point
- Elevation: 3,058 m (10,033 ft)
- Prominence: 372 m (1,220 ft)
- Listing: Mountains of Alberta; Mountains of British Columbia
- Coordinates: 51°45′48″N 116°39′05″W

Geography
- Country: Canada
- Provinces: Alberta and British Columbia
- Protected area: Banff National Park
- Parent range: Waputik
- Topo map: NTS 82N15 Mistaya Lake

Climbing
- First ascent: 1917 Interprovincial Boundary Commission

Breaker Mountain is a mountain located on the border of Alberta and British Columbia. It is part of the Waputik Range. It was named in 1917 by Arthur O. Wheeler for the resemblance of a cornice on its summit to a breaking wave.

== See also ==
- List of peaks on the Alberta–British Columbia border
- List of mountains in the Canadian Rockies
