= Kataka Mountain =

Mountain in Alberta and British Columbia, Canada

- Location within Alberta Location within British Columbia Location within Canada

Highest point
- Elevation: 2,379 m (7,805 ft)
- Prominence: 309 m (1,014 ft)
- Coordinates: 52°49′56″N 118°23′49″W

Geography
- Location: Alberta; British Columbia
- Topo map: NTS 83D16 Jasper

Kataka Mountain is located on the border of Alberta and British Columbia. It was named in 1916 by Morrison P. Bridgland.

== See also ==
- List of peaks on the Alberta–British Columbia border
- Mountains of Alberta
- Mountains of British Columbia
