= Caniche Peak =

Mountain peak in Canada

- Location within Alberta Location within British Columbia Location within Canada

Highest point
- Elevation: 2,552 m (8,373 ft)
- Prominence: 17 m (56 ft)
- Coordinates: 52°45′14″N 118°22′16″W

Geography
- Location: Alberta - British Columbia, Canada
- Parent range: Canadian Rockies
- Topo map: NTS 83D16 Jasper

Caniche Peak is located on the border of Alberta and British Columbia. It was named in 1922 by Arthur O. Wheeler. He suggested it be called Poodle Park as he thought it resembled the head of a poodle. The French word for poodle, "Caniche", was adopted to give the name more class.

== See also ==
- List of peaks on the Alberta–British Columbia border
- Mountains of Alberta
- Mountains of British Columbia
