= Whiteshield Mountain =

Mountain in Alberta and British Columbia, Canada

- Location within Alberta Location within British Columbia Location within Canada

Highest point
- Elevation: 2,684 m (8,806 ft)
- Prominence: 278 m (912 ft)
- Parent peak: Devout Peak (2689 m)
- Listing: Mountains of Alberta; Mountains of British Columbia
- Coordinates: 53°18′19″N 119°21′16″W

Geography
- Country: Canada
- Provinces: Alberta and British Columbia
- District: Cariboo Land District
- Parent range: Park Ranges
- Topo map: NTS 83E6 Twintree Lake

Whiteshield Mountain is located at the northern boundary of Mount Robson Provincial Park on the Alberta-British Columbia border. It was named in 1924 because of the ice and snow on the eastern side of the mountain.

== See also ==
- List of peaks on the Alberta–British Columbia border
