= Intersection Mountain =

Mountain in Canada

- Location within Alberta Location within British Columbia Location within Canada

Highest point
- Elevation: 2,452 m (8,045 ft)
- Prominence: 816 m (2,677 ft)
- Parent peak: Mount Sprague
- Listing: Mountains of Alberta; Mountains of British Columbia
- Coordinates: 53°47′56″N 120°00′04″W

Geography
- Country: Canada
- Provinces: Alberta and British Columbia
- Topo map: NTS 93H16 Mount Sir Alexander

Intersection Mountain is a 2,452-metre (8,045 ft) mountain on the Continental Divide. The mountain is so named because it lies at the intersection of the 120th meridian where the British Columbia and Alberta border diverges from its line along the Divide northwards along the meridian. The mountain is in Kakwa Provincial Park in British Columbia and Willmore Wilderness Park in Alberta and is near Casket Pass.

== See also ==
- List of peaks on the British Columbia–Alberta border
