= Mount Gorman =

Mountain on border of Alberta and British Columbia in Canada

- Location within Alberta Location within British Columbia Location within Canada

Highest point
- Elevation: 2,380 m (7,810 ft)
- Prominence: 470 m (1,540 ft)
- Parent peak: Mount Minnes (2421 m)
- Listing: Mountains of Alberta; Mountains of British Columbia
- Coordinates: 54°10′43″N 120°00′12″W

Geography
- Country: Canada
- Provinces: Alberta and British Columbia
- Parent range: Northern Rocky Mountains
- Topo map: NTS 93I1 Jarvis Lakes

Mount Gorman is located on the border of Alberta and British Columbia. It was named in 1925 after A.O. Gorman, a government surveyor with the Dominion Land Survey.

== See also ==
- List of peaks on the British Columbia–Alberta border
