= Mastodon Mountain =

Mountain in Alberta, Canada

- Location within Alberta Location within British Columbia Location within Canada

Highest point
- Elevation: 2,986 m (9,797 ft)
- Prominence: 453 m (1,486 ft)
- Coordinates: 52°36′26″N 118°20′04″W

Geography
- Location: Alberta; British Columbia
- Topo map: NTS 83D9 Amethyst Lakes

Climbing
- First ascent: 1933 Rex Gibson, R.C. Hind, W.J. Watson, E.L. Woolf

Mastodon Mountain is located on the border of Alberta and British Columbia. It was named in 1922 by Arthur O. Wheeler.

== See also ==
- List of peaks on the Alberta–British Columbia border
- Mountains of Alberta
- Mountains of British Columbia
