= Twin Cairns =

Mountain in British Columbia, Canada

- Location within British Columbia

Highest point
- Elevation: 2,544 m (8,346 ft)
- Prominence: 269 m (883 ft)
- Listing: Mountains of British Columbia
- Coordinates: 51°04′19″N 115°48′18″W

Geography
- Location: British Columbia, Canada
- District: Kootenay Land District
- Topo map: NTS 82O4 Banff

Twin Cairns is a mountain located southeast of Simpson Pass and southwest of Banff Sunshine, along the Continental Divide which separates British Columbia and Alberta in the Rocky Mountains of western Canada.
