= Chushina Ridge =

Ridge in Alberta, Canada

- Location within Alberta

Highest point
- Coordinates: 53.13331°N 119.06917°W

Geography
- Location: Alberta, Canada

Chushina Ridge is a ridge in Alberta, Canada and is nearby to Lynx Mountain and Extinguisher Tower. The nearest accommodations to Chushina Ridge are Robson Pass Campground and Berg Lake Campground in Fraser-Fort George H.

Chushina is a word derived from the Stoney language meaning "small".
