= Baril Peak =

Mountain in the country of Canada

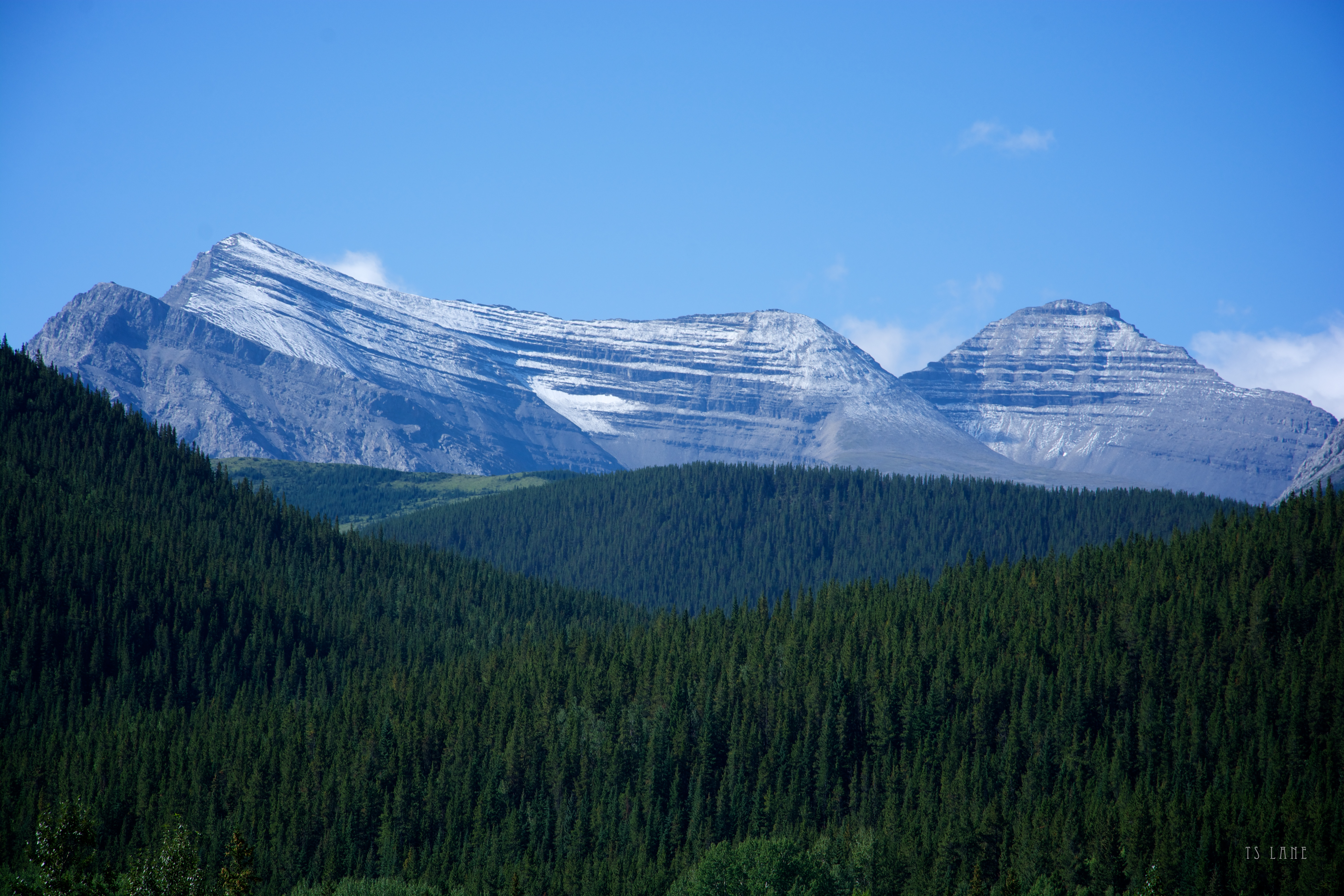
- Baril Peak (left), Mt. Cornwell (right), from NE

Highest point
- Elevation: 3,000 m (9,800 ft)
- Prominence: 283 m (928 ft)
- Coordinates: 50°17′58″N 114°45′23″W

Geography
- Location within Alberta Location within British Columbia Location within Canada
- Country: Canada
- Provinces: Alberta and British Columbia
- Parent range: High Rock Range
- Topo map: NTS 82J7 Mount Head

Climbing
- First ascent: 1915 Interprovincial Boundary Commission

Baril Peak is located on the border of Alberta and British Columbia on the Continental Divide. It was named in 1918 after Conrad M.L. Baril, a Dominion surveyor killed in World War I.

The mountain is composed of sedimentary rock laid down during the Precambrian to Jurassic periods. Formed in shallow seas, this sedimentary rock was pushed east and over the top of younger rock during the Laramide orogeny.

== See also ==
- List of peaks on the Alberta–British Columbia border
- List of mountains of Alberta
- Mountains of British Columbia
