= Gibraltar Mountain (Alberta) =

Peak in the Canadian Rockies

- Location within Alberta

Highest point
- Elevation: 2,665 m (8,743 ft)
- Prominence: 455 m (1,493 ft)
- Parent peak: Mist Mountain
- Listing: Mountains of Alberta
- Coordinates: 50°35′25″N 114°50′14″W

Geography
- Location: Kananaskis Country, Alberta, Canada
- Parent range: Misty Range
- Topo map: NTS 82J10 Mount Rae

Gibraltar Mountain is a peak in the Canadian Rockies, located 23 km (14 mi) east of Upper Kananaskis Lake, Alberta. Named in 1928 due to its physical likeness to the Rock of Gibraltar in the Mediterranean Sea.
