= High Rock Range =

Mountain range in Alberta and British Columbia, Canada

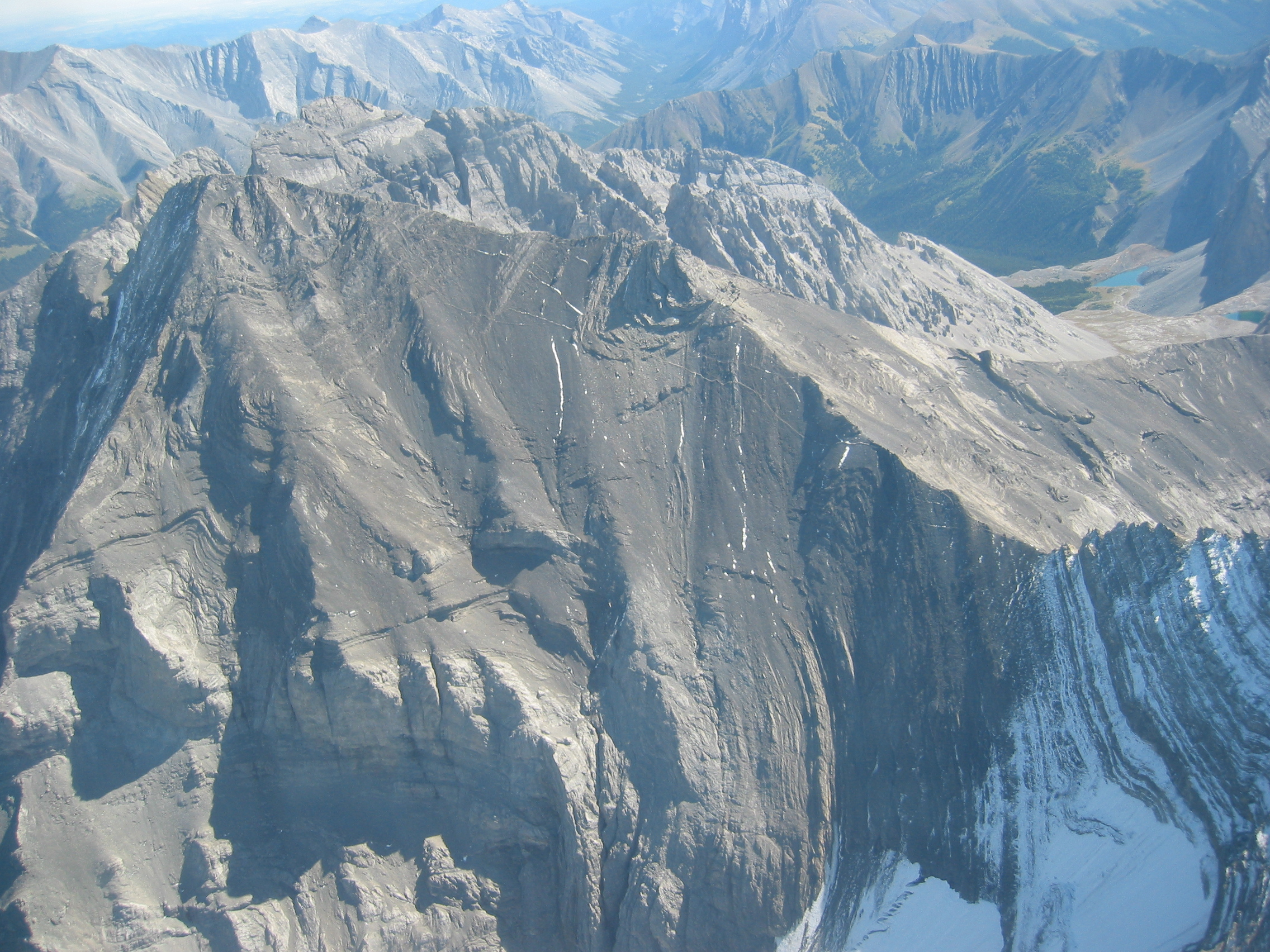
- Mount Rae from the north, Sept. 2006

Highest point
- Peak: Mount Rae
- Elevation: 3,218 m (10,558 ft)
- Coordinates: 50°37′22″N 114°58′29″W

Dimensions
- Length: 117 km (73 mi) N-S
- Width: 37 km (23 mi) E-W
- Area: 2,172 km^{2} (839 mi^{2})

Geography
- Location within Alberta Location within British Columbia Location within Canada
- Country: Canada
- Provinces: Alberta and British Columbia
- Range coordinates: 50°08′56″N 114°42′21″W
- Parent range: Canadian Rockies
- Topo map: NTS 82J2 Fording River

The High Rock Range is a mountain range of the Canadian Rockies in southwestern Alberta and southeastern British Columbia, Canada.

It is a part of the Southern Continental Ranges and is located on the Continental Divide, north of the Crowsnest Pass and south of the Highwood Pass. It lies partly within Kananaskis Country.

The Misty Range and the Greenhills Range are subdivisions of the High Rock.

The High Rock Range covers a surface area of 2,172 km^{2} (838 mi^{2}), has a length of 117 km (73 mi) (from north to south) and a width of 37 km (23 mi).

== List of mountains ==
Name	Elevation		Prominence		Coordinates
Name	m	ft	m	ft	Coordinates
Mount Rae	3,218	10,558	1,330	4,360	50°37′22″N 114°58′29″W
Mist Mountain	3,140	10,300	487	1,598	50°33′15″N 114°54′36″W
Tornado Mountain	3,090	10,140	950	3,120	49°58′1″N 114°39′16″W
Courcelette Peak	3,044	9,987	775	2,543	50°17′27″N 114°48′21″W
Mount Lyall	2,950	9,680	529	1,736	50°5′23″N 114°42′17″W
Beehive Mountain	2,895	9,498	245	804	50°3′54″N 114°39′47″W
Mount Armstrong	2,823	9,262	250	820	50°21′1″N 114°45′59″W
Crowsnest Mountain	2,785	9,137	925	3,035	49°42′13″N 114°34′26″W
Mount Muir	2,758	9,049	518	1,699	50°23′28″N 114°49′35″W
Mount Strachan	2,682	8,799	272	892	50°22′57″N 114°49′3″W
Allison Peak	2,646	8,681	541	1,775	49°44′36″N 114°38′47″W
Mount Tecumseh	2,547	8,356	518	1,699	49°39′55″N 114°38′46″W

== See also ==
- Ranges of the Canadian Rockies
