= Storm Mountain (Misty Range) =

Mountain in Alberta's Rockies, Canada

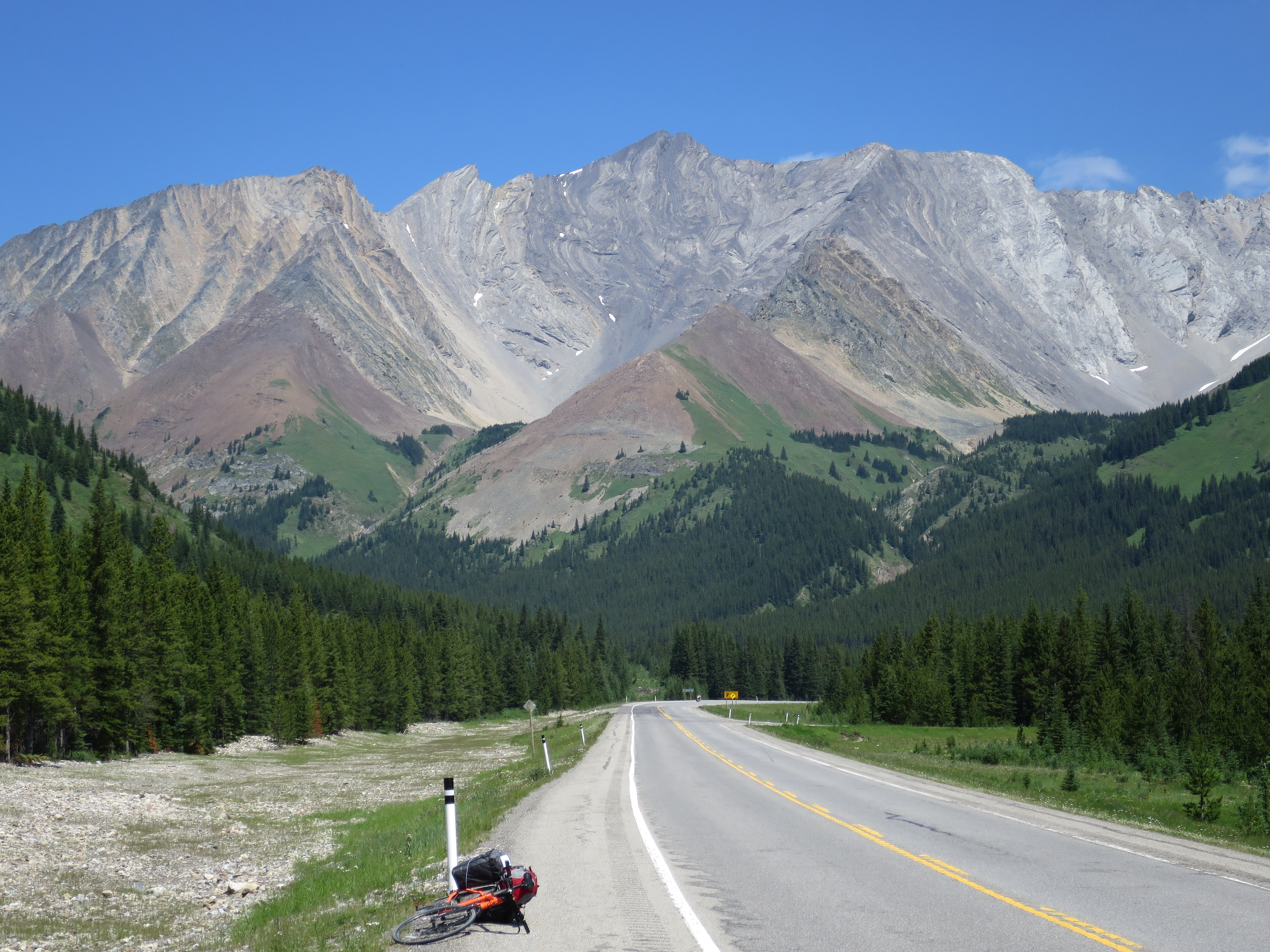
- Storm Mountain from Kananaskis Trail

Highest point
- Elevation: 3,095 m (10,154 ft)
- Prominence: 291 m (955 ft)
- Parent peak: Mist Mountain (3139 m)
- Listing: Mountains of Alberta
- Coordinates: 50°35′13″N 114°56′23″W

Geography
- Country: Canada
- Province: Alberta
- Parent range: Misty Range
- Topo map: NTS 82J10 Mount Rae

Climbing
- Easiest route: Difficult Scramble

Storm Mountain is a mountain in Alberta's Rockies, Canada.

It is located alongside Highway 40, southwest of the Highwood Pass parking lot in Kananaskis Country, and is part of the Misty Range of the Canadian Rockies. It is identifiable as the tall peak between Mount Arethusa and Mist Mountain at the far south end of the Misty Range.

It was named by George Mercer Dawson in 1884, for the storm clouds he saw on the summit.

== The "other" Storm Mountain ==
Dawson also named another peak Storm Mountain, 100 km away on the continental divide that separates Alberta and British Columbia, and Banff National Park and Kootenay National Park, to the northwest. It is unusual for two peaks of such close proximity to share the same name, especially when named by the same individual.

== Gallery ==
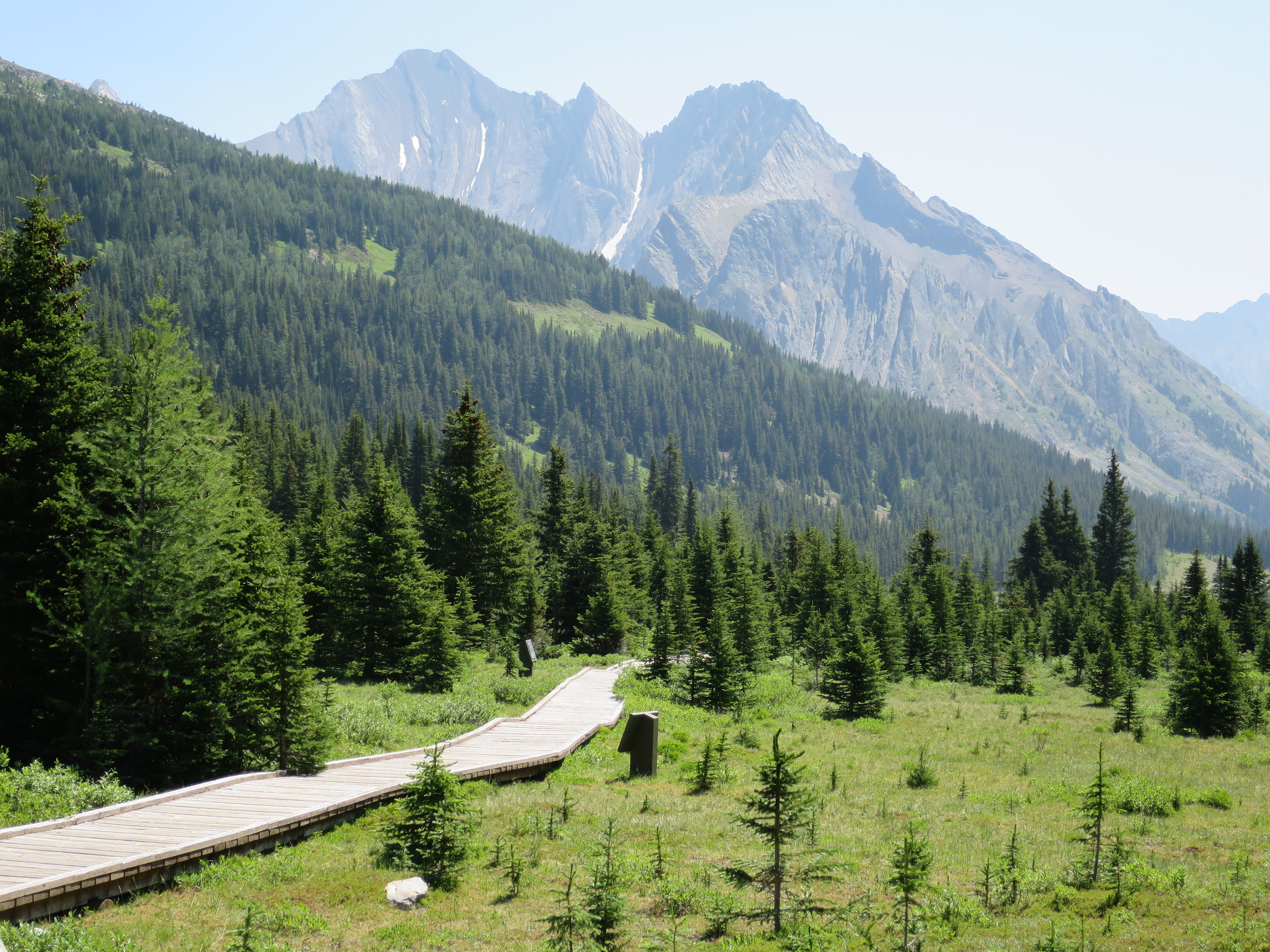
Storm Mountain from Highwood Pass

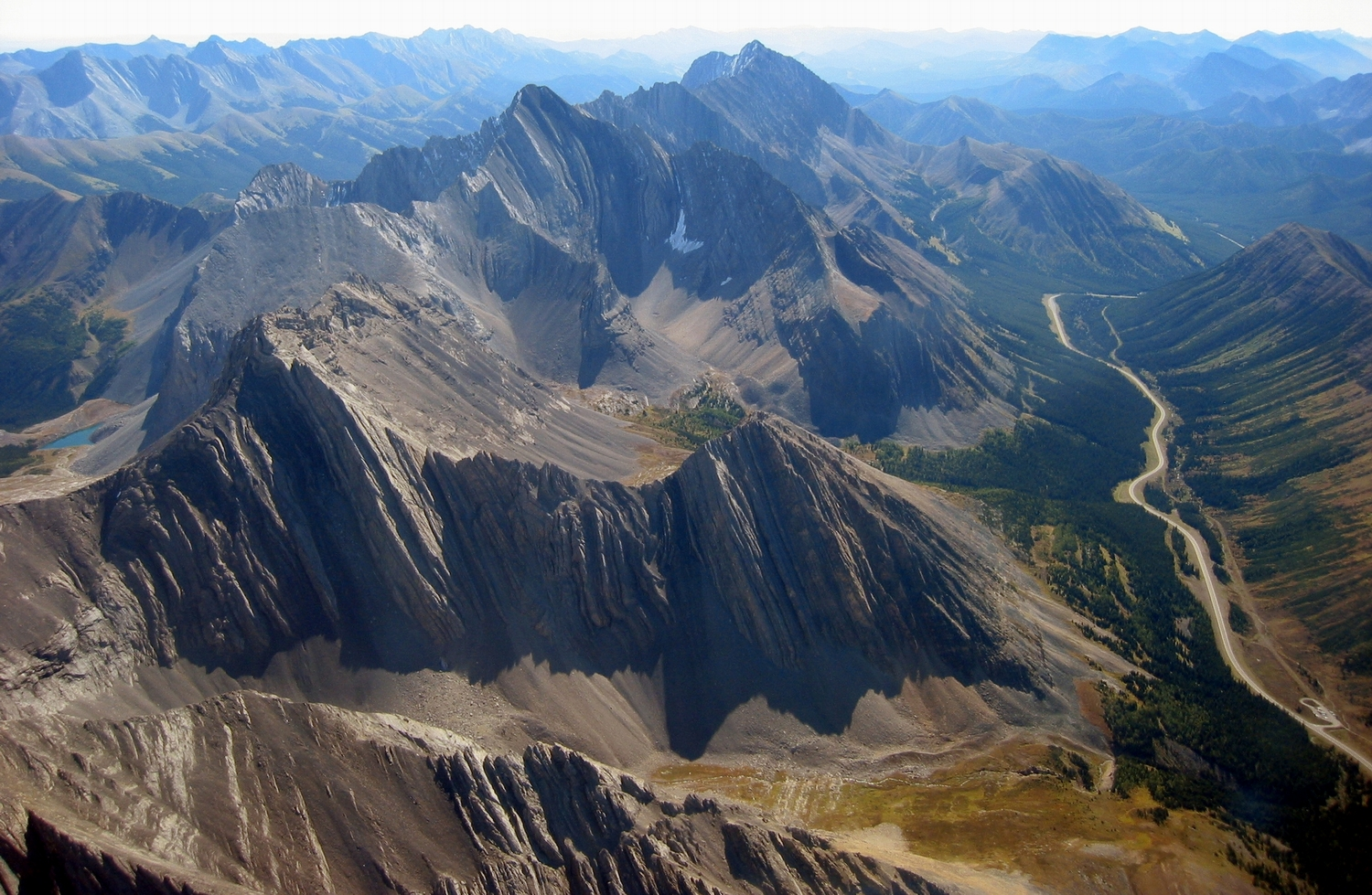
Arethusa, Storm, and Mist Mountain from the north

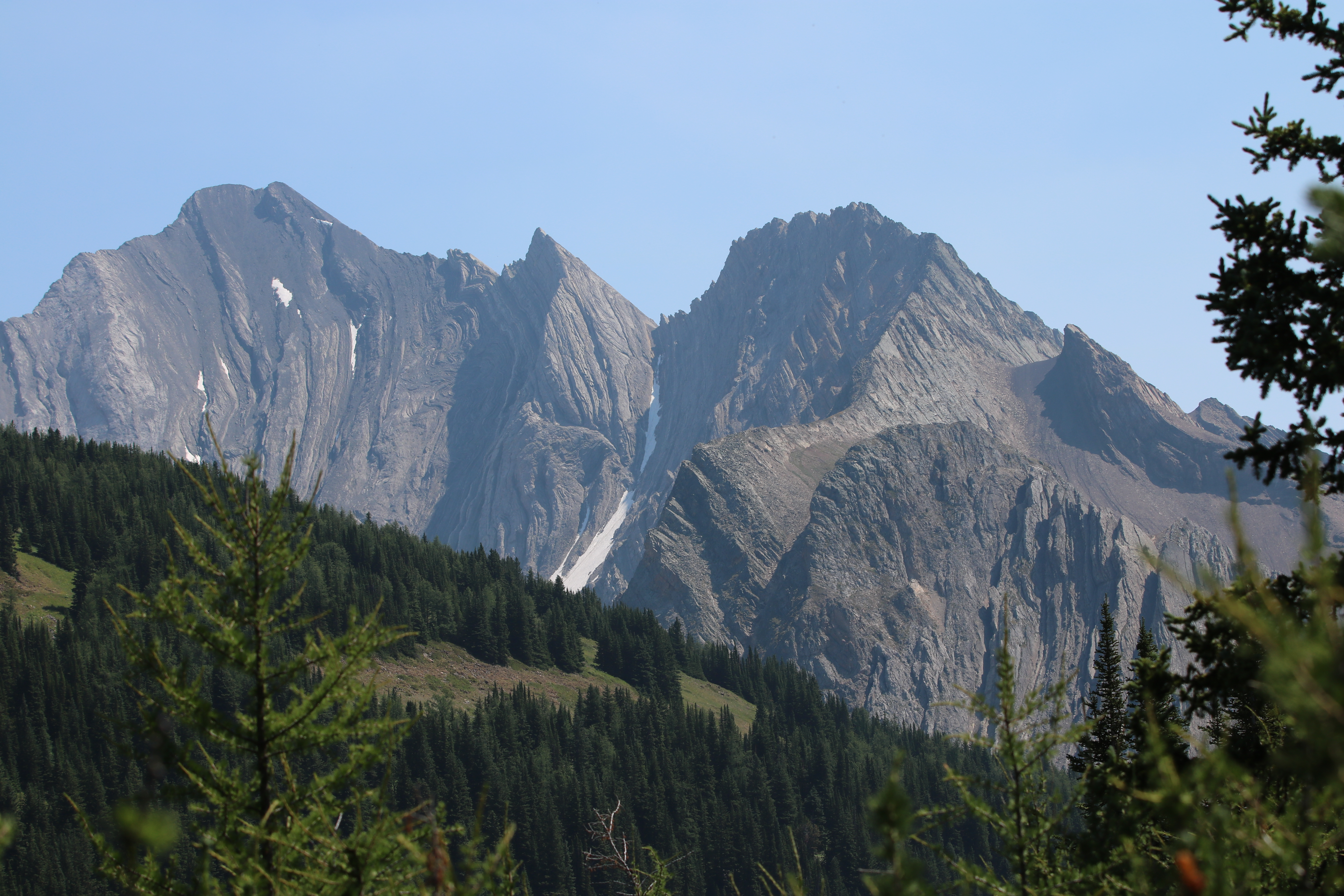
Storm Mountain from Highwood Pass area
