= Mount Strachan =

Mountain in Alberta and British Columbia, Canada

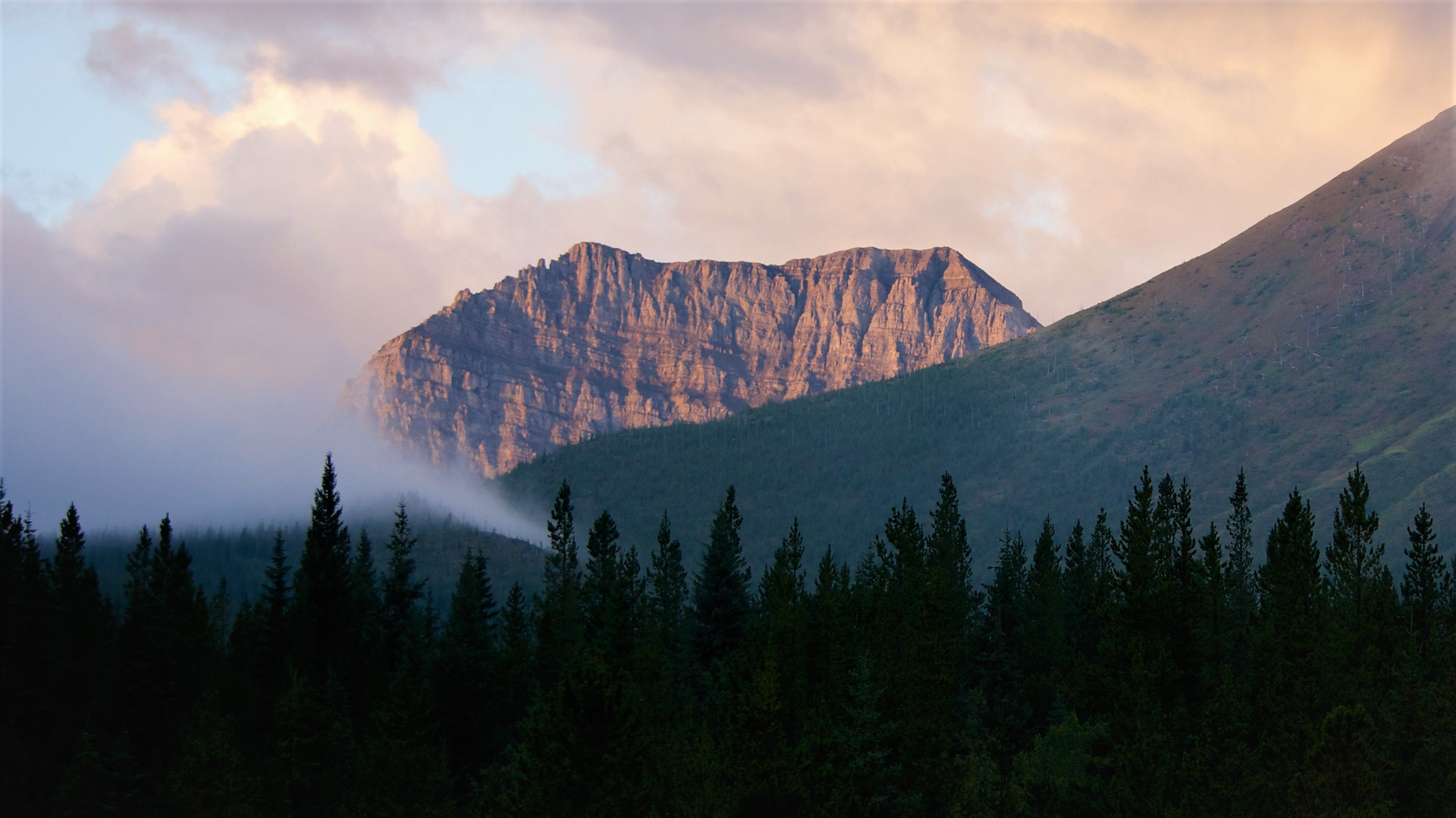
- North aspect

Highest point
- Elevation: 2,682 m (8,799 ft)
- Prominence: 272 m (892 ft)
- Parent peak: Mount Muir (2758 m)
- Listing: Mountains of Alberta; Mountains of British Columbia
- Coordinates: 50°22′57″N 114°49′03″W

Geography
- Location within Alberta Location within British Columbia Location within Canada
- Country: Canada
- Provinces: Alberta and British Columbia
- District: Kootenay Land District
- Parent range: High Rock Range; Canadian Rockies
- Topo map: NTS 82J7 Mount Head

Mount Strachan is located North of Fording River Pass and straddles the Continental Divide marking the Alberta-British Columbia border. It was named in 1918 after Lt. Henry Strachan, VC, a Scottish born Canadian army officer. Lt. Strachan was awarded the Victoria Cross after leading his regiment through German lines in World War I, killing seven gunners of a machine gun battery with his own sword and returning safely with his men and 15 prisoners through enemy lines during the night.

== See also ==
- List of peaks on the Alberta–British Columbia border
