= Pyriform Mountain =

Mountain in Alberta, Canada

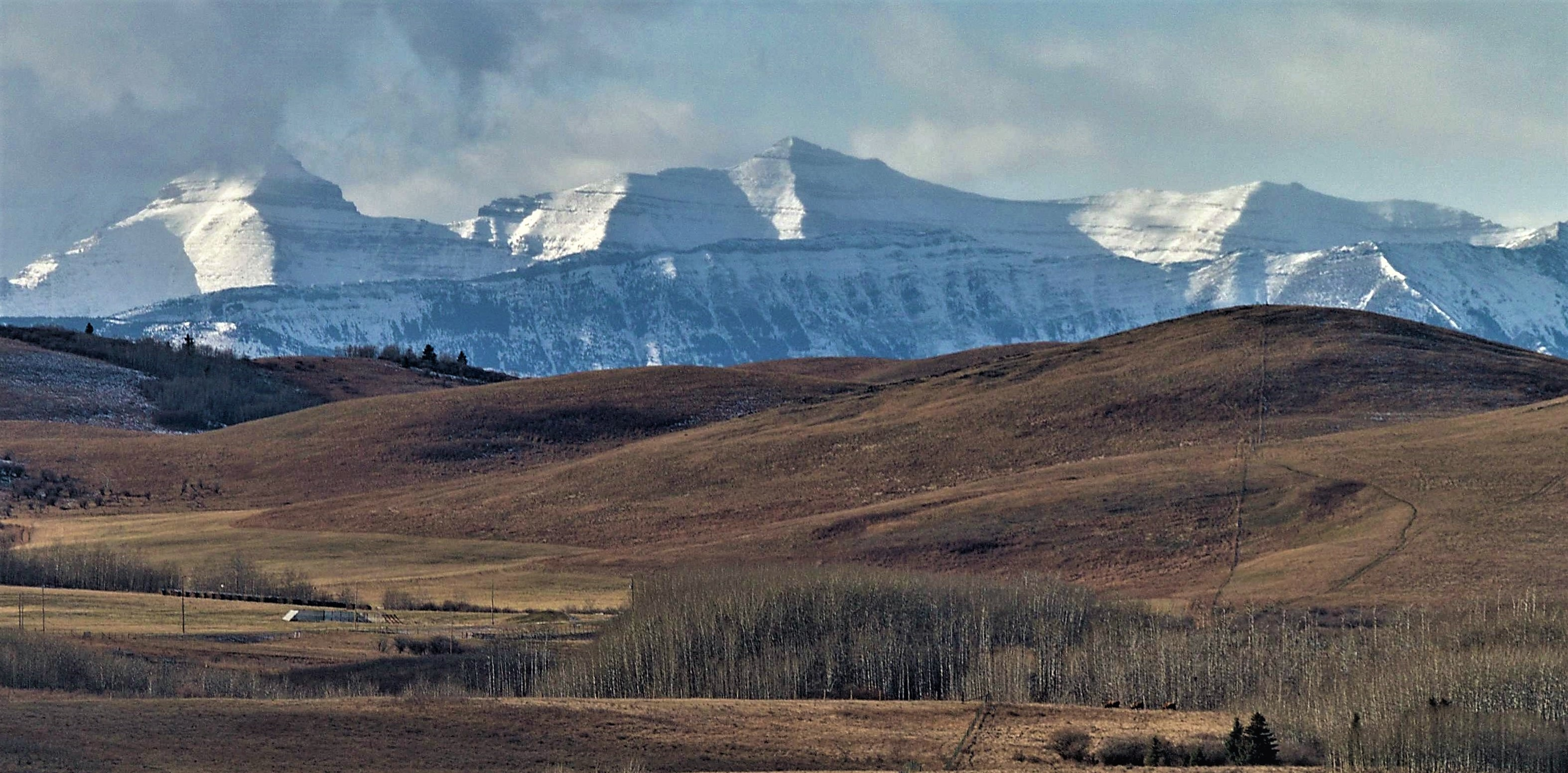
- East aspect

Highest point
- Elevation: 2,739 m (8,986 ft)
- Prominence: 312 m (1,024 ft)
- Parent peak: Lineham Ridge (2,856 m)
- Isolation: 4.02 km (2.50 mi)
- Listing: Mountains of Alberta
- Coordinates: 50°31′13″N 114°41′46″W

Geography
- Location within Kananaskis Improvement District Location within Alberta
- Interactive map of Pyriform Mountain
- Country: Canada
- Province: Alberta
- Protected area: Elbow-Sheep Wildland Provincial Park
- Parent range: Highwood Range; Canadian Rockies
- Topo map: NTS 82J10 Mount Rae

Geology
- Rock age: Cambrian
- Rock type: Sedimentary rock

Pyriform Mountain is a 2,739-metre (8,986-foot) mountain summit located 74 km (46 mi) southwest of Calgary in Kananaskis Country of Alberta, Canada. Pyriform Mountain is the third-highest officially named peak in the Highwood Range which is a subrange of the Canadian Rockies. Precipitation runoff from the mountain's west slope drains into headwaters of Junction Creek which is a tributary of the Sheep River; and the east slope drains to Trap Creek which is a tributary of the Highwood River. Topographic relief is modest as the summit rises approximately 740 m (2,430 ft) above Junction Creek in 2 km (1.2 mi).

== Etymology ==
The mountain's scientific name means pear-shaped (from Latin pirum "pear" and forma "shape"). The toponym was officially adopted by the Geographical Names Board of Canada on March 31, 1924.

== Geology ==
Pyriform Mountain is composed of sedimentary rock laid down during the Precambrian to Jurassic periods. Formed in shallow seas, this sedimentary rock was pushed east and over the top of younger rock during the Laramide orogeny.

== Climate ==
Based on the Köppen climate classification, Pyriform Mountain is located in a subarctic climate zone with cold, snowy winters, and mild summers. Winter temperatures can drop below −20 °C with wind chill factors below −30 °C. The months June through September offer the most favorable weather for climbing the peak.

== Gallery ==
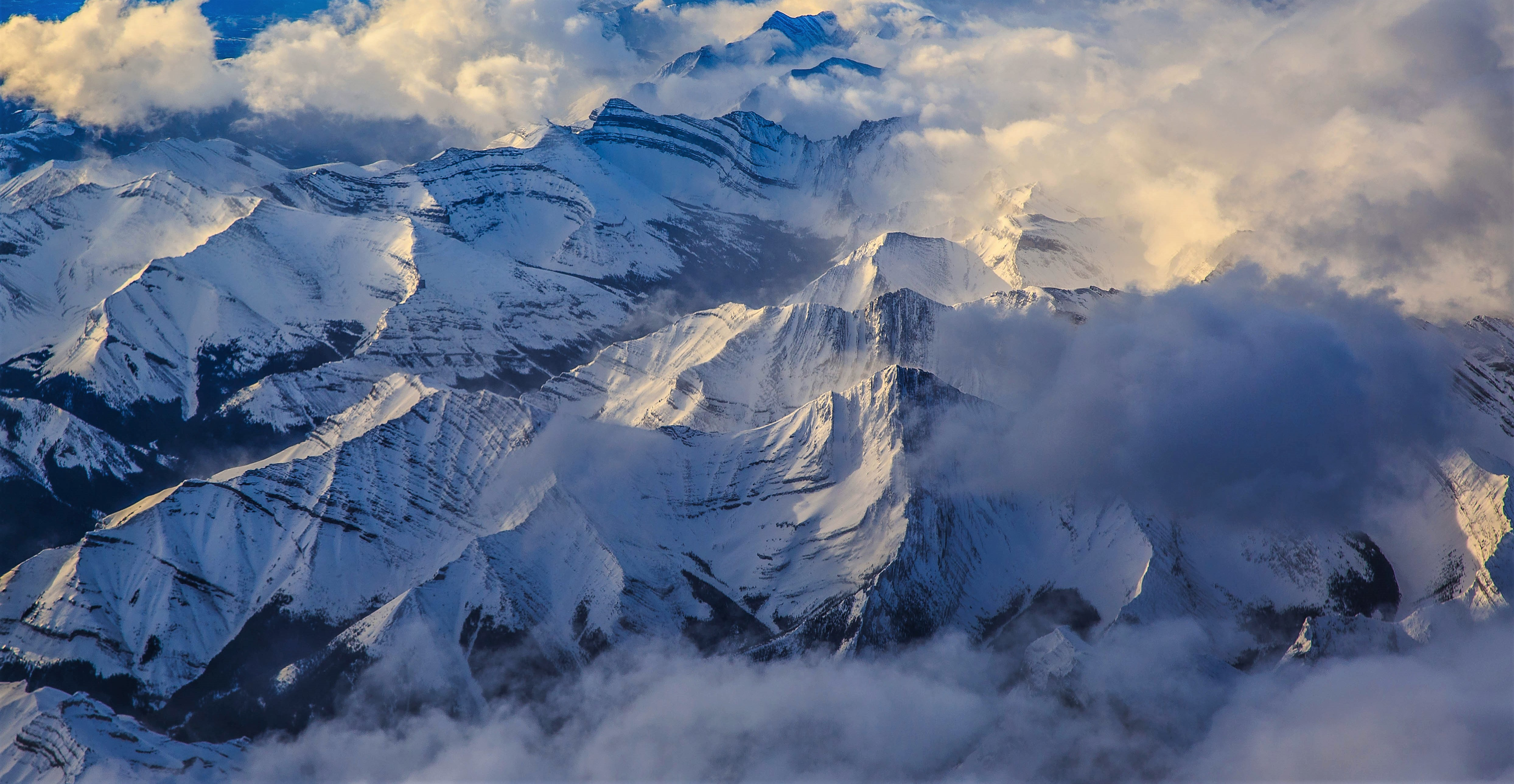
Flying over the Highwood Range; Pyriform Mountain in upper left quadrant

== See also ==
- Geography of Alberta
