= Mount Maclaren =

Mountain in Alberta and British Columbia, Canada

- Location within Alberta Location within British Columbia Location within Canada

Highest point
- Elevation: 2,843 m (9,327 ft)
- Prominence: 532 m (1,745 ft)
- Listing: Mountains of Alberta; Mountains of British Columbia
- Coordinates: 50°21′30″N 114°47′24″W

Geography
- Country: Canada
- Provinces: Alberta and British Columbia
- District: Kootenay Land District
- Parent range: High Rock Range
- Topo map: NTS 82J7 Mount Head

Mount Maclaren is located north of Fording River Pass and straddles the Continental Divide, marking the Alberta-British Columbia border. It was named in 1918 after Charles H. MacLaren, C.M.G., D.S.O.

== See also ==
- List of peaks on the Alberta–British Columbia border
