= Courcelette Peak =

Mountain in British Columbia, Canada

- Location within British Columbia

Highest point
- Elevation: 3,044 m (9,987 ft)
- Prominence: 775 m (2,543 ft)
- Listing: Mountains of British Columbia; Mountains in the Canadian Rockies
- Coordinates: 50°17′27″N 114°48′21″W

Geography
- Country: Canada
- Province: British Columbia
- District: Kootenay Land District
- Parent range: High Rock Range
- Topo map: NTS 82J7 Mount Head

Climbing
- First ascent: 1915

Courcelette Peak is located East of the Fording River, just NE of Elkford in British Columbia, Canada. The peak was named in 1916 by the Interprovincial Boundary Survey for Courcelette in France which Canadian troops re-captured from the German Army in the Battle of Flers–Courcelette during World War I. This was the first enemy engagement by the Canadian army during the Battle of the Somme.
