= Cougar Mountain (Alberta) =

Summit in Alberta, Canada

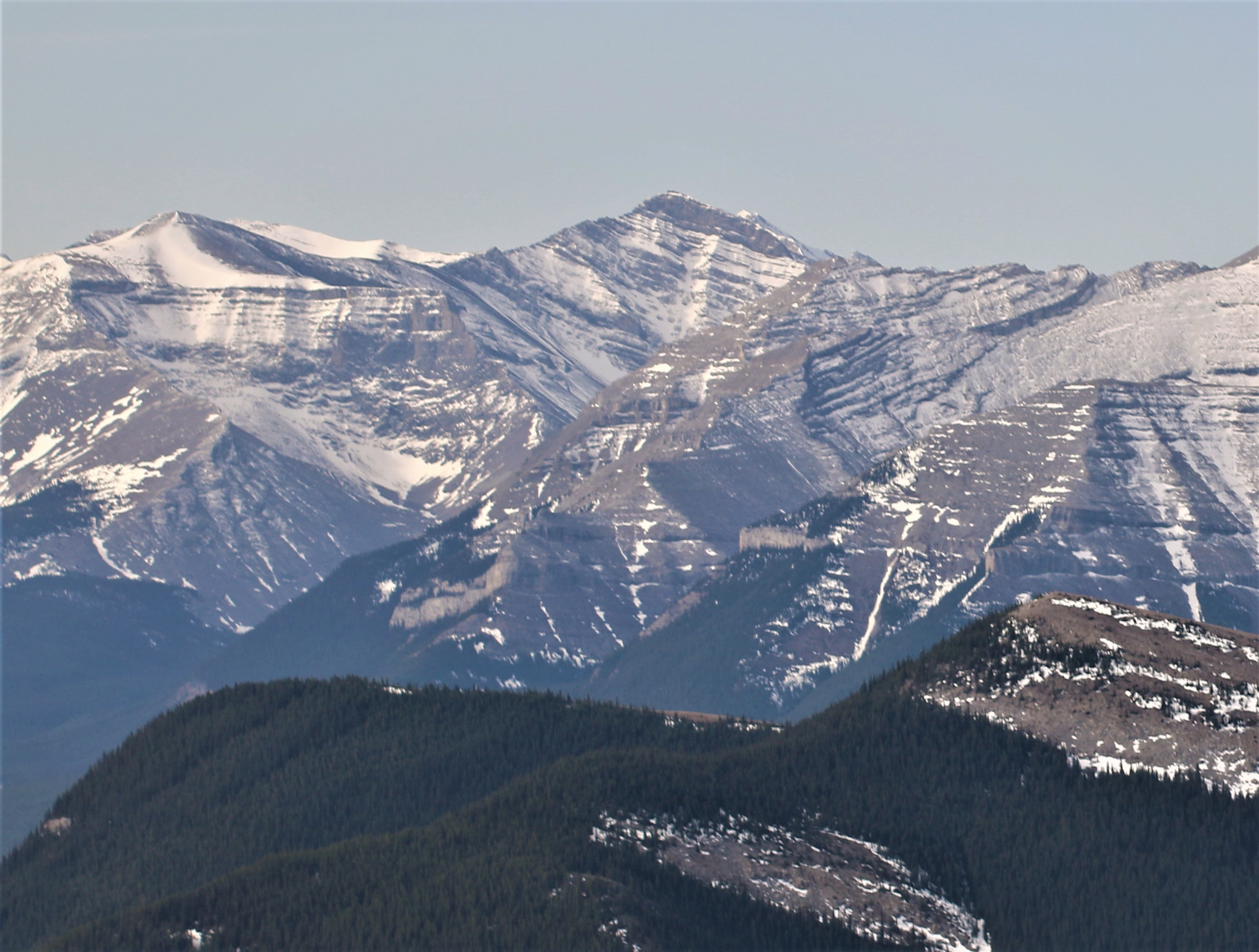
- North aspect

Highest point
- Elevation: 2,863 m (9,393 ft)
- Prominence: 226 m (741 ft)
- Parent peak: Mount Burns (2936 m)
- Listing: Mountains of Alberta
- Coordinates: 50°40′25″N 114°53′56″W

Geography
- Location within Alberta Location within Canada
- Location: Alberta, Canada
- Parent range: Front Ranges
- Topo map: NTS 82J10 Mount Rae

Cougar Mountain is a summit in the Elbow River Valley, Kananaskis Country, Alberta, Canada.

Cougar Mountain was named after the animal.

== Geology ==
Cougar Mountain is composed of sedimentary rock laid down during the Precambrian to Jurassic periods. Formed in shallow seas, this sedimentary rock was pushed east and over the top of younger rock during the Laramide orogeny.

== Climate ==
Based on the Köppen climate classification, Cougar Mountain is located in a subarctic climate zone with cold, snowy winters, and mild summers. Winter temperatures can drop below −20 °C (−4 °F) with wind chill factors below −30 °C (−22 °F). The months of June through September offer the most favorable weather for climbing this peak.

== See also ==
- Geography of Alberta
