= Ptarmigan Cirque =

Landform in Alberta, Canada

Coordinates: 50.602907°N 114.98170950°W

Ptarmigan Cirque is the cirque between Mount Arethusa and Mount Rae at the Highwood Pass in Kananaskis Country, Alberta, Canada.

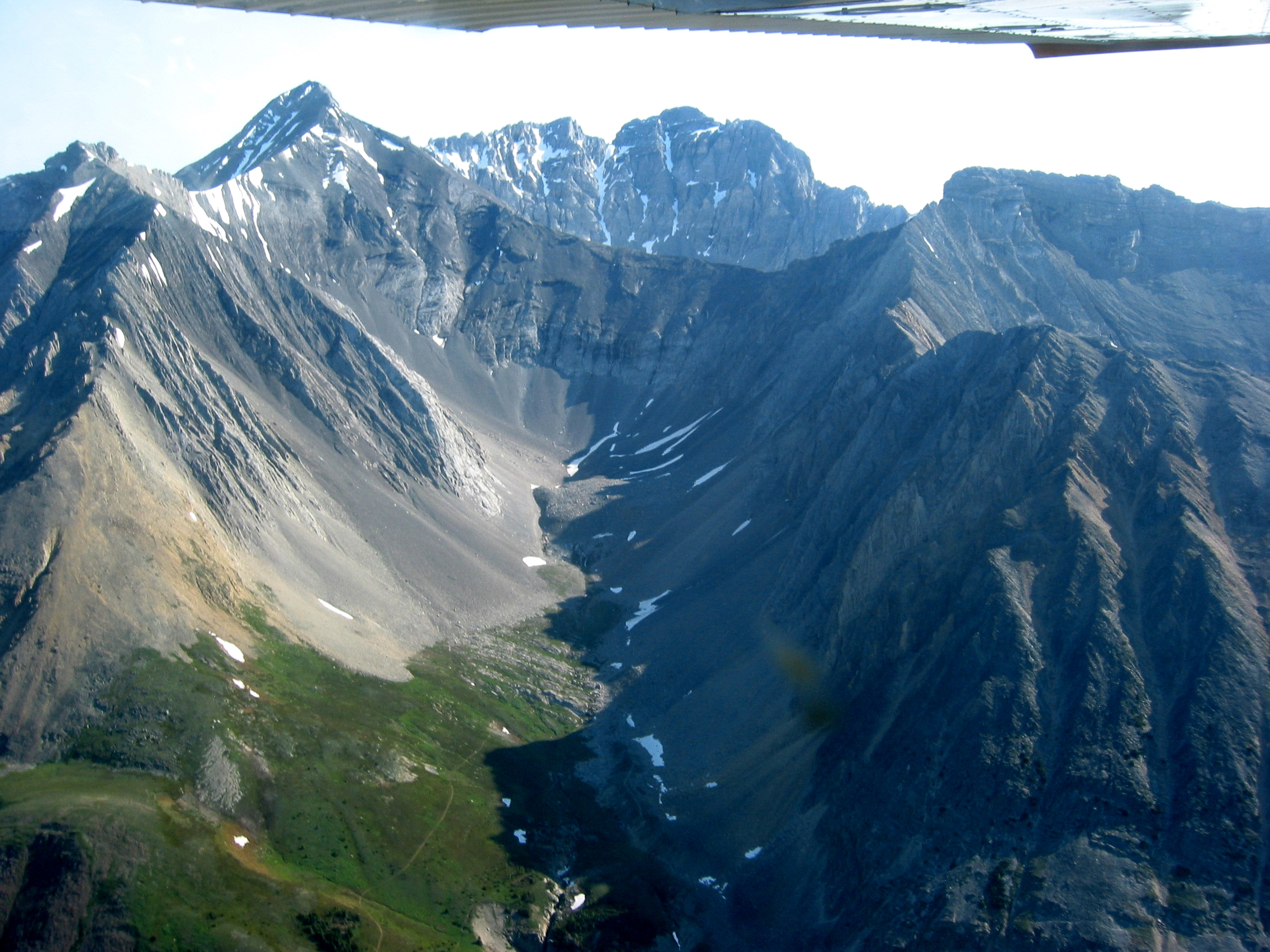
Ptarmigan Cirque

The Ptarmigan Cirque hiking trail is a short loop in the cirque. After an easy climb up from the Highwood Pass parking lot on Highway 40 the hike proceeds around the bottom of the valley counter clock wise. There are 10 or more interpretive signs to stop at. The back of the loop contains a small waterfall and the start of the Mount Rae scramble.
