= Raymond M. Patterson =

British explorer (1898–1984)

Raymond Murray Patterson (1898 - 1984) was an Oxford educated writer and explorer of the Canadian northwest.

== Life and career ==
"R.M. Patterson is recognized by many as one of the finest writers on the Canadian wilderness. While his writing skills earned him a wide and appreciative audience, he was more than a skilled wordsmith. He was also a careful and sympathetic observer, an intrepid explorer and a meticulous historian. Orville Prescott, in the New York Times, described his Dangerous River as "a modest book which betrays no indication that Mr. Patterson realizes what a remarkable man he is.” It is through his autobiographical writings, a blended mix of history, adventure and vivid description, that we can appreciate this remarkable individual. He published five books over a span of 14 years: Dangerous River (1954), Buffalo Head (1961), Far Pastures (1963), Trail to the Interior (1966) and Finlay’s River (1968)."

Patterson was born in England in 1898. He was educated at Rossall School and later attended Oxford University, where he trained for a career at the Bank of England. He served in World War I as an artillery officer until he was captured, and he remained a POW until the end of the War.

In 1924, longing for adventure, Patterson went to Canada where he obtained a homestead on the Peace River. In 1927 he explored the Nahanni River in a canoe. Many years later, he wrote his most famous book Dangerous River, about his two trips into the Nahanni River Valley during the late 1920s.

Patterson married Marigold Portman in 1929, the same year he sold his homestead and moved to Buck Spring Ranch near Cochrane, Alberta. From this location, for the next four years, he completed a series of explorations throughout the region. Of particular note was his exploration of the Highwood River, Highwood Pass and the Lower and Upper Kananaskis Lakes region.

In 1933 he purchased the Buffalo Head Ranch in the Highwood Valley from George Pocaterra. From this location, between 1933 and 1945 he explored the Highwood and Elk Valley region. In 1945, aggrieved over the opening of a road into the Highwood Valley and the aftermath of a 1936 fire, he sold the ranch and resettled to Victoria, British Columbia. Over the next twenty-five years he wrote a series of articles for Blackwood's Magazine and The Beaver and five books about his explorations and adventures. He died in 1984.

His legacy includes "Patterson's Peak" which was officially adopted in 2000 by the Geographical Names Board of Canada. The peak is just northwest of Mount Head which he is credited with making the first ascent in 1934. He made the first ascent of Holy Cross Mountain in 1937.

The information in this article can be confirmed and supplemented by referring to an article published by The Arctic Institute of North America, linked here: https://pubs.aina.ucalgary.ca/arctic/Arctic44-1-85.pdf
