= Mount Armstrong (High Rock Range) =

Mountain in the Canadian Rockies

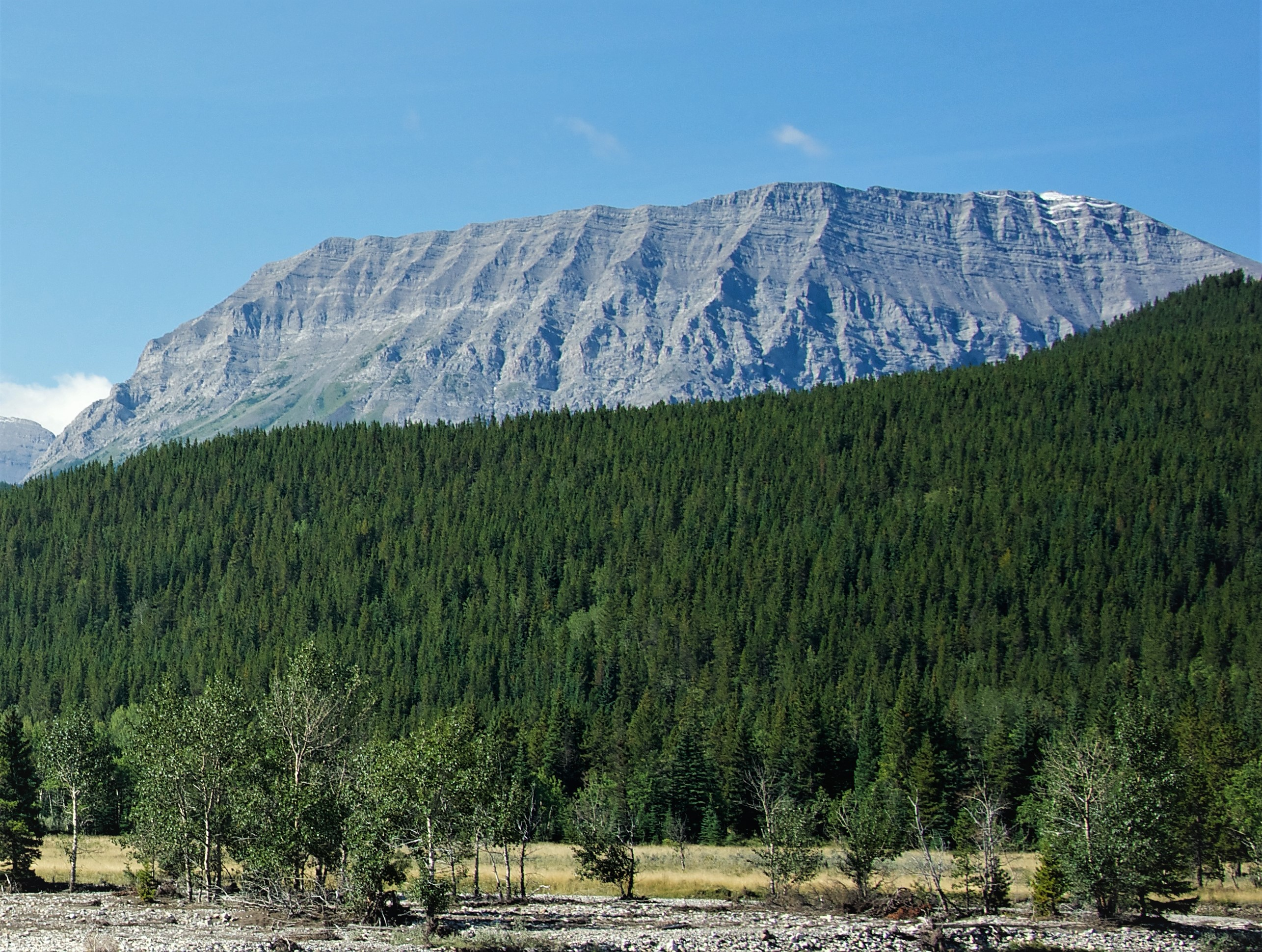
- Northeast aspect

Highest point
- Elevation: 2,823 m (9,262 ft)
- Prominence: 250 m (820 ft)
- Parent peak: Mount Maclaren (2843 m)
- Listing: Mountains of Alberta; Mountains of British Columbia
- Coordinates: 50°21′01″N 114°45′59″W

Geography
- Location within Alberta Location within British Columbia Location within Canada
- Country: Canada
- Provinces: Alberta and British Columbia
- Parent range: High Rock Range
- Topo map: NTS 82J7 Mount Head

Mount Armstrong is a mountain located on the Canadian provincial boundary between Alberta and British Columbia on the Continental Divide. It was named in 1918 after John Douglas Armstrong, a lieutenant with the Canadian Engineers who was killed in action on April 9, 1917, at Vimy Ridge during World War I.

== See also ==
- List of peaks on the Alberta–British Columbia border
