= Tornado Mountain =

Mountain on Alberta/British Columbia border in Canada

- Location within Alberta Location within British Columbia Location within Canada

Highest point
- Elevation: 3,090 m (10,140 ft) (Note: Other sources state 3099 m.)
- Prominence: 950 m (3,120 ft)
- Parent peak: Mount Rae (3218 m)
- Listing: Mountains of Alberta; Mountains of British Columbia
- Coordinates: 49°58′01″N 114°39′16″W

Geography
- Country: Canada
- Provinces: Alberta and British Columbia
- Parent range: High Rock Range
- Topo map: NTS 82G15 Tornado Mountain

Climbing
- First ascent: 1915 Interprovincial Boundary Commission

Tornado Mountain is located on the border of Alberta and British Columbia on the Continental Divide. It is Alberta's 48th most prominent mountain. It was named in 1915 by Morrison P. Bridgland.

== See also ==
- List of peaks on the Alberta–British Columbia border
- List of mountains in the Canadian Rockies
- Boreal Plains Ecozone (CEC)
