= Holy Cross Mountain =

Mountain in Alberta, Canada

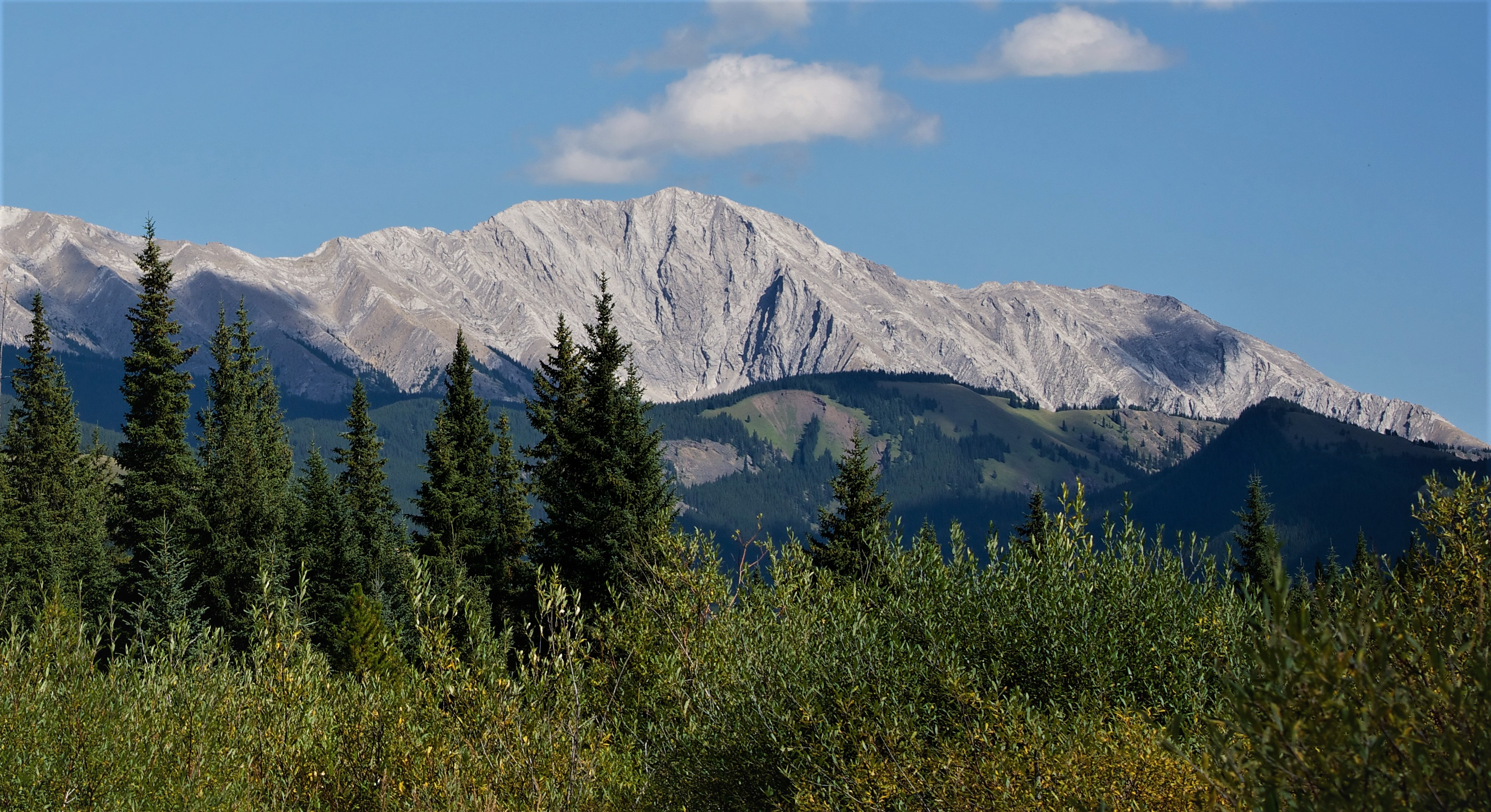
- West aspect

Highest point
- Elevation: 2,650 m (8,694 ft)
- Prominence: 189 m (620 ft)
- Parent peak: Mount Head (2,782 m)
- Isolation: 2.1 km (1.3 mi)
- Listing: Mountains of Alberta
- Coordinates: 50°25′18″N 114°37′53″W

Geography
- Location within Alberta Location within Canada
- Interactive map of Holy Cross Mountain
- Country: Canada
- Province: Alberta
- Protected area: Don Getty Wildland Provincial Park
- Parent range: Highwood Range; Canadian Rockies
- Topo map: NTS 82J7 Mount Head

Geology
- Mountain type: Fault block
- Rock type: Sedimentary rock

Climbing
- First ascent: 1937 by Raymond M. Patterson
- Easiest route: Scrambling

Holy Cross Mountain is a 2,650-metre (8,694-foot) mountain summit located in Alberta, Canada.

== Description ==
Holy Cross Mountain is situated 85 km (53 mi) southwest of Calgary at the southern end of the Highwood Range which is a subrange of the Canadian Rockies. The peak is set 14 km (8.7 mi) east of the Continental Divide, in Don Getty Wildland Provincial Park. Precipitation runoff from the mountain drains into Stony and Wileman creeks which are tributaries of the Highwood River. Topographic relief is significant as the summit rises 1,150 meters (3,773 ft) above the Highwood Valley in 4 km (2.5 mi). The mountain can be seen from Highway 40 and Highway 541, and is identifiable from as far as Calgary.

== History ==
The mountain was named in the early 1900s by George Pocaterra for the shape of a white cross which appears on the east slope as snowfields melt in the spring. The mountain's toponym was officially adopted February 28, 1980, by the Geographical Names Board of Canada.

The first ascent of the summit was made in 1937 by Raymond M. Patterson. A peak 6 km (3.7 mi) northwest of Holy Cross Mountain is officially named "Patterson's Peak" in his honor.

== Geology ==
Holy Cross Mountain was created during the Lewis Overthrust. The peak is underlain by folded and thrust-faulted sedimentary rock laid down during the Mesozoic and Paleozoic eras. Formed in shallow seas, this sedimentary rock was pushed east and over the top of younger rock during the Laramide orogeny.

== Climate ==
Based on the Köppen climate classification, Holy Cross Mountain is located in a subarctic climate zone with cold, snowy winters, and mild summers. Winter temperatures can drop below −20 °C with wind chill factors below −30 °C. The months June through September offer the most favorable weather to climb the mountain.

== Gallery ==
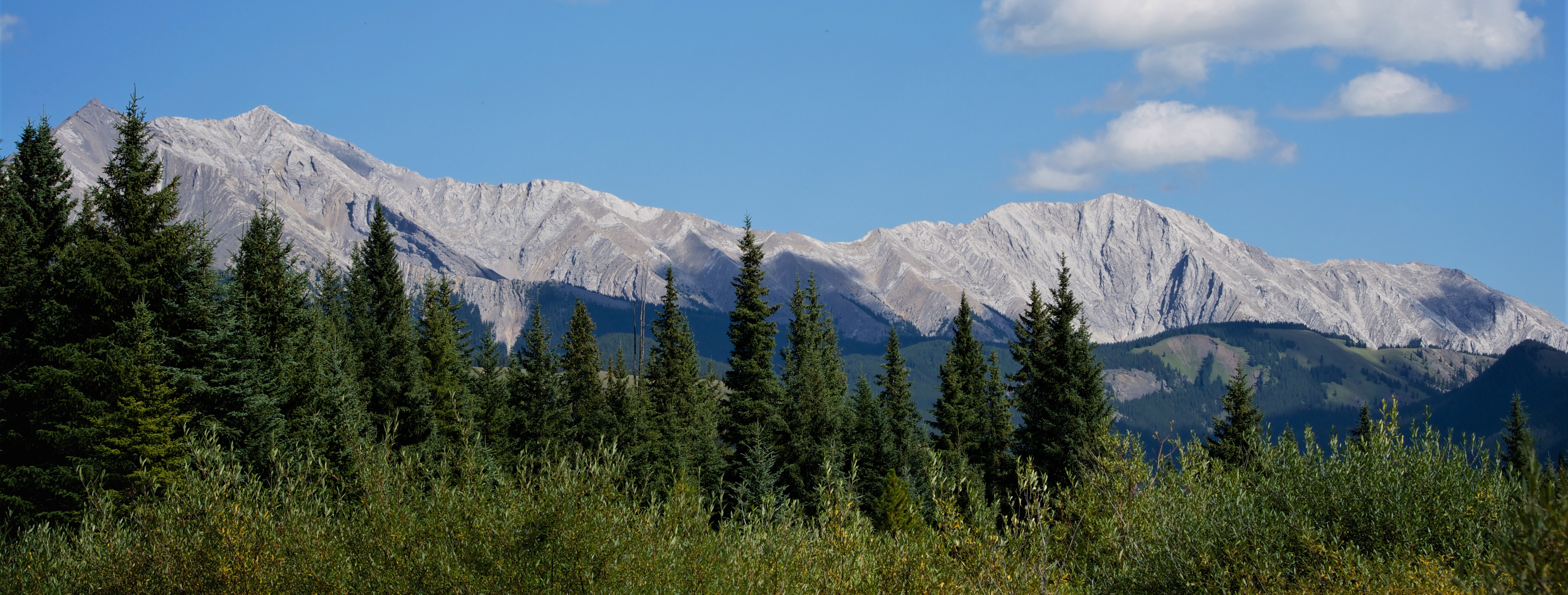
Holy Cross Mountain (right) with line parent Mt. Head (left) from Highwood Valley

== See also ==
- Kananaskis Country
- Geography of Alberta
