= Beehive Mountain =

Mountain in Canada

- Location within Alberta

Highest point
- Elevation: 2,895 m (9,498 ft)
- Prominence: 245 m (804 ft)
- Coordinates: 50°03′54″N 114°39′47″W

Geography
- Location: Alberta/British Columbia, Canada
- Parent range: High Rock Range
- Topo map: NTS 82J2 Fording River

Climbing
- First ascent: 1913 Interprovincial Boundary Commission

The Beehive Mountain was named by George M. Dawson in 1886. It is located in the High Rock Range of the Canadian Rockies and is on the boundary between British Columbia and Alberta, which follows the Continental Divide in this area. The mountain was named for its fancied resemblance to a beehive.

== See also ==
- Mountains of Alberta
- Mountains of British Columbia
- List of peaks on the Alberta–British Columbia border
