= Mount Armstrong =

Mount Armstrong may refer to:

- Mount Armstrong (Antarctica)
- Mount Armstrong (High Rock Range) in the Canadian Rockies
- Mount Armstrong (New South Wales) in New South Wales, Australia
- Mount Armstrong (Northern Territory) in Northern Territory, Australia
- Mount Armstrong (New Zealand)
- Mount Armstrong (Tagish Highland) in British Columbia, Canada
- Mount Armstrong (Yukon) in Yukon, Canada
