= Mount Lyall (Canadian Rockies) =

Mountain in Canada

- Location within Alberta Location within British Columbia Location within Canada

Highest point
- Elevation: 2,950 m (9,680 ft)
- Prominence: 529 m (1,736 ft)
- Parent peak: Apis Peak (2957 m)
- Listing: Mountains of Alberta; Mountains of British Columbia
- Coordinates: 50°05′23″N 114°42′17″W

Geography
- Country: Canada
- Provinces: Alberta and British Columbia
- Parent range: High Rock Range
- Topo map: NTS 82J2 Fording River

Mount Lyall is located on the border of Alberta and British Columbia on the Continental Divide. It was named in 1917 after the Scottish botanist David Lyall (1817–1895).

== See also ==
- List of peaks on the British Columbia–Alberta border
