= Allison Peak =

Mountain in Alberta and British Columbia, Canada

- Location within Alberta Location within British Columbia Location within Canada

Highest point
- Elevation: 2,646 m (8,681 ft)
- Prominence: 541 m (1,775 ft)
- Listing: Mountains of Alberta; Mountains of British Columbia
- Coordinates: 49°44′36″N 114°38′47″W

Geography
- Country: Canada
- Provinces: Alberta and British Columbia
- District: Kootenay Land District
- Parent range: High Rock Range
- Topo map: NTS 82G10 Crowsnest

Climbing
- Easiest route: Scrambling Routes

Allison Peak is located on the Canadian provincial boundary of Alberta and British Columbia along the Continental Divide. It was named in 1915 by Morrison P. Bridgland after Douglas Allison. Douglas Allison was a law enforcement agent.

== See also ==
- List of peaks on the Alberta–British Columbia border
