= Fording River Pass =

Mountain pass in Alberta/British Columbia, Canada

- Location within Alberta Location within British Columbia

Third Approach
- Location: Alberta/British Columbia, Canada
- Range: Canadian Rockies
- Coordinates: 50°19′09″N 114°47′19″W
- Topo map: NTS 82J7 Mount Head

Fording River Pass is located at the head of the Fording River and straddles the Continental Divide marking the Alberta-British Columbia border.
