= Mount Burns =

Mountain in Alberta, Canada

Coordinates: 50.642°N 114.860°W

Mount Burns is a summit in Alberta, Canada.

Mount Burns was named after Pat Burns, the proprietor of a nearby mine.
