= Mount Arethusa =

Mountain in Alberta, Canada

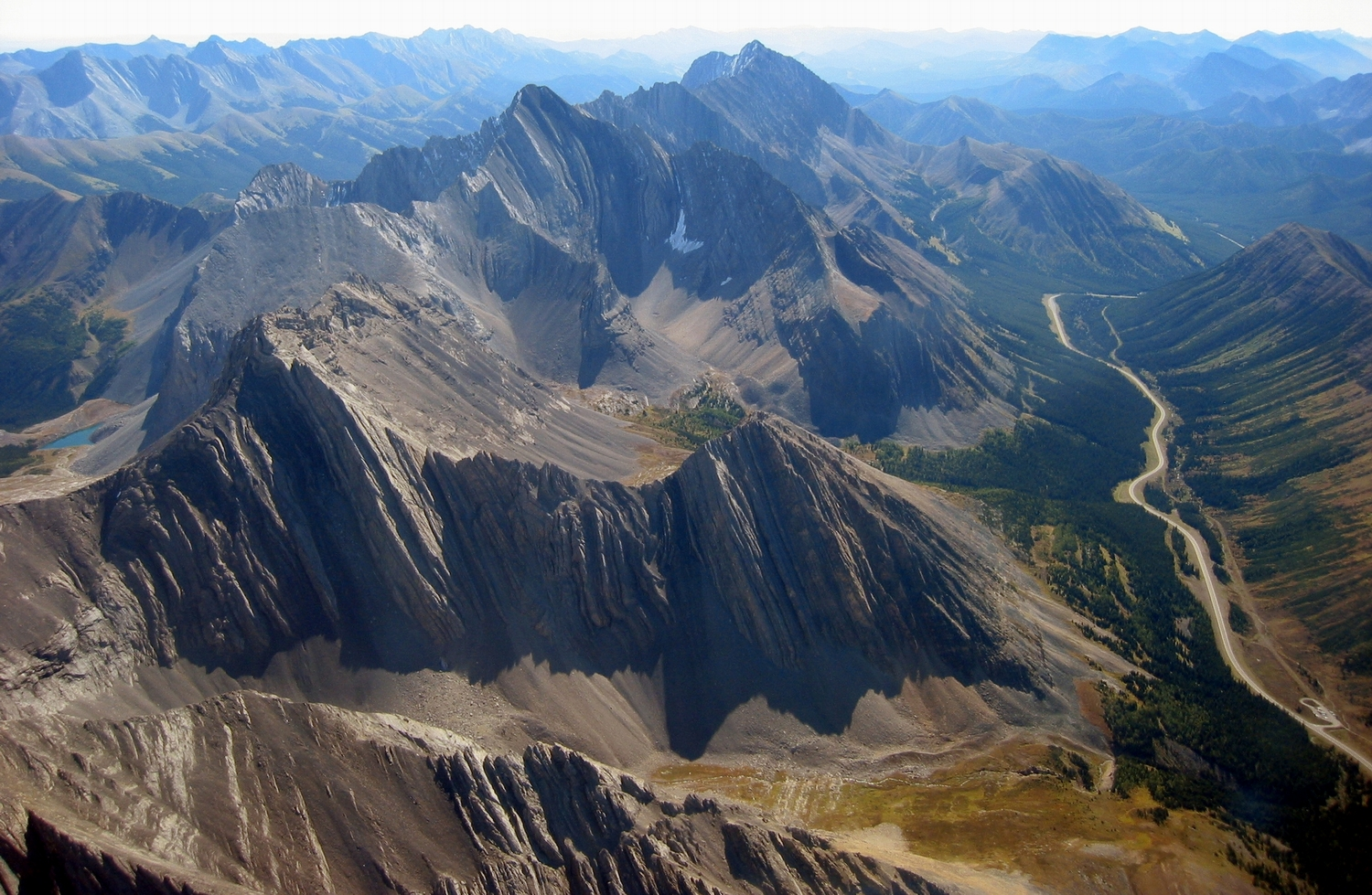
- Mt. Arethusa and Little Arethusa from the north (Sept. 2006)

Highest point
- Elevation: 2,912 m (9,554 ft)
- Prominence: 138 m (453 ft)
- Listing: Mountains of Alberta
- Coordinates: 50°36′27″N 114°58′04″W

Geography
- Location within Alberta
- Country: Canada
- Province: Alberta
- Parent range: Misty Range
- Topo map: NTS 82J10 Mount Rae

Climbing
- Easiest route: Difficult scramble

Mount Arethusa is a mountain located in the Canadian Rockies of Alberta, Canada.

It is located alongside Highway 40, immediately east of the Highwood Pass parking lot in Kananaskis Country, and is a part of the Misty Range of the Southern Continental Ranges. It is named after HMS Arethusa, a British cruiser sunk in the 1915 Battle of Dogger Bank.

Mt. Arethusa and Little Arethusa form the southern wall of the Ptarmigan cirque which is a popular short hike from the Highwood Pass parking lot.
