= Misty Range =

Mountain range in Alberta, Canada

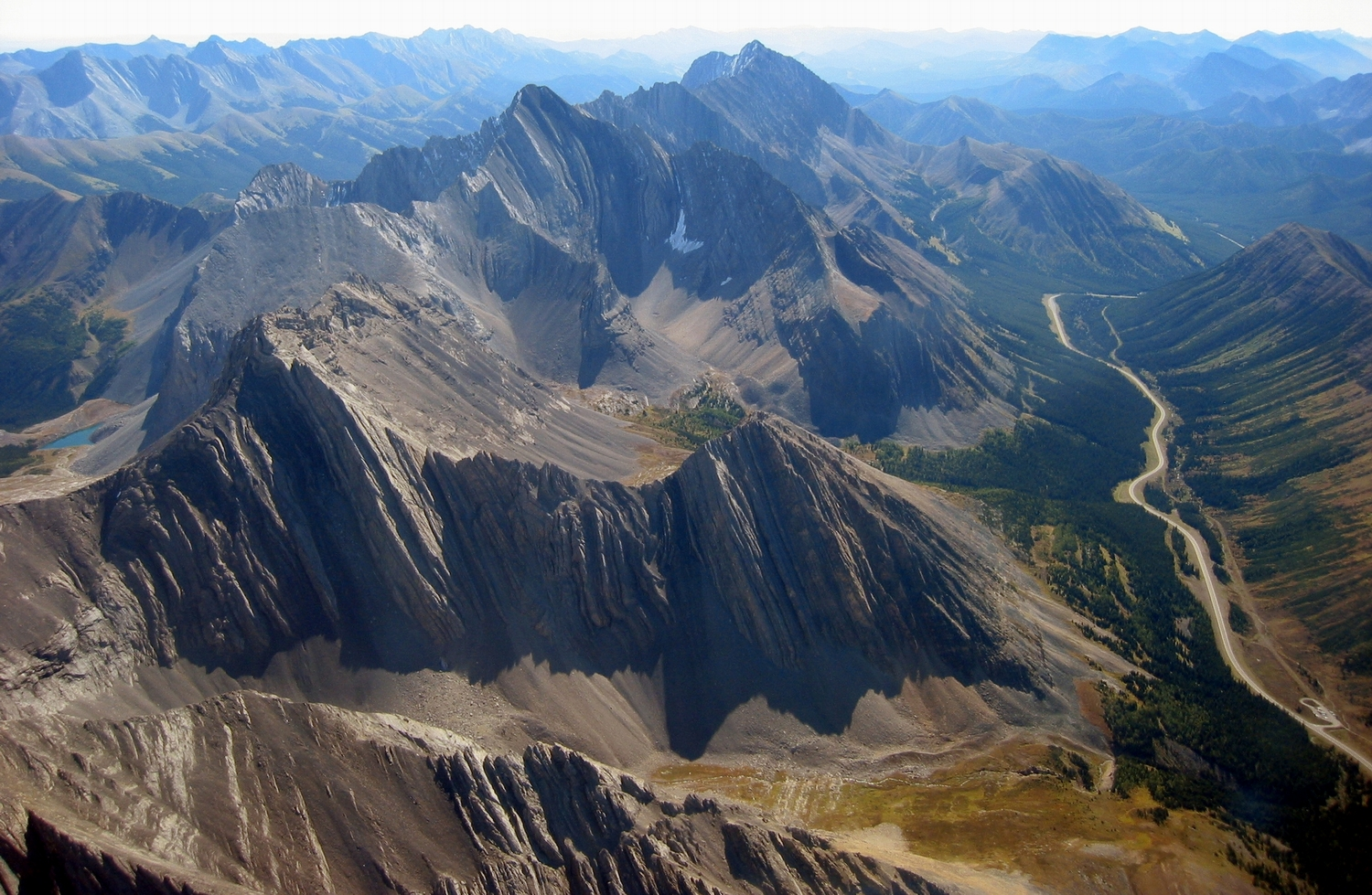
- Misty Range with Mist Mountain and Mount Arethusa

Highest point
- Peak: Mount Rae
- Elevation: 3,218 m (10,558 ft)
- Coordinates: 50°37′22″N 114°58′29″W

Dimensions
- Length: 18 km (11 mi) N-S
- Width: 16 km (9.9 mi) E-W
- Area: 136 km^{2} (53 mi^{2})

Geography
- Location within Alberta
- Country: Canada
- Province: Alberta
- Range coordinates: 50°36′30″N 114°56′31″W
- Parent range: High Rock Range
- Topo map: NTS 82J10 Mount Rae

The Misty Range is a mountain range of the Canadian Rockies located east of the Bighorn Highway within Kananaskis Country, Canada.

It is a sub-range of the High Rock Range in the Southern Continental Ranges.

== List of Mountains ==
This range includes the following mountains:

Name	Elevation		Prominence		Coordinates
Name	m	ft	m	ft	Coordinates
Mount Rae	3,218	10,558	1,330	4,360	50°37′22″N 114°58′29″W
Mist Mountain	3,140	10,300	487	1,598	50°33′15″N 114°54′36″W
Storm Mountain	3,095	10,154	291	955	50°35′13″N 114°56′23″W
Mount Arethusa	2,912	9,554	138	453	50°36′27″N 114°58′4″W

== See also ==
- Ranges of the Canadian Rockies
