= Mist Mountain =

Mountain in Alberta, Canada

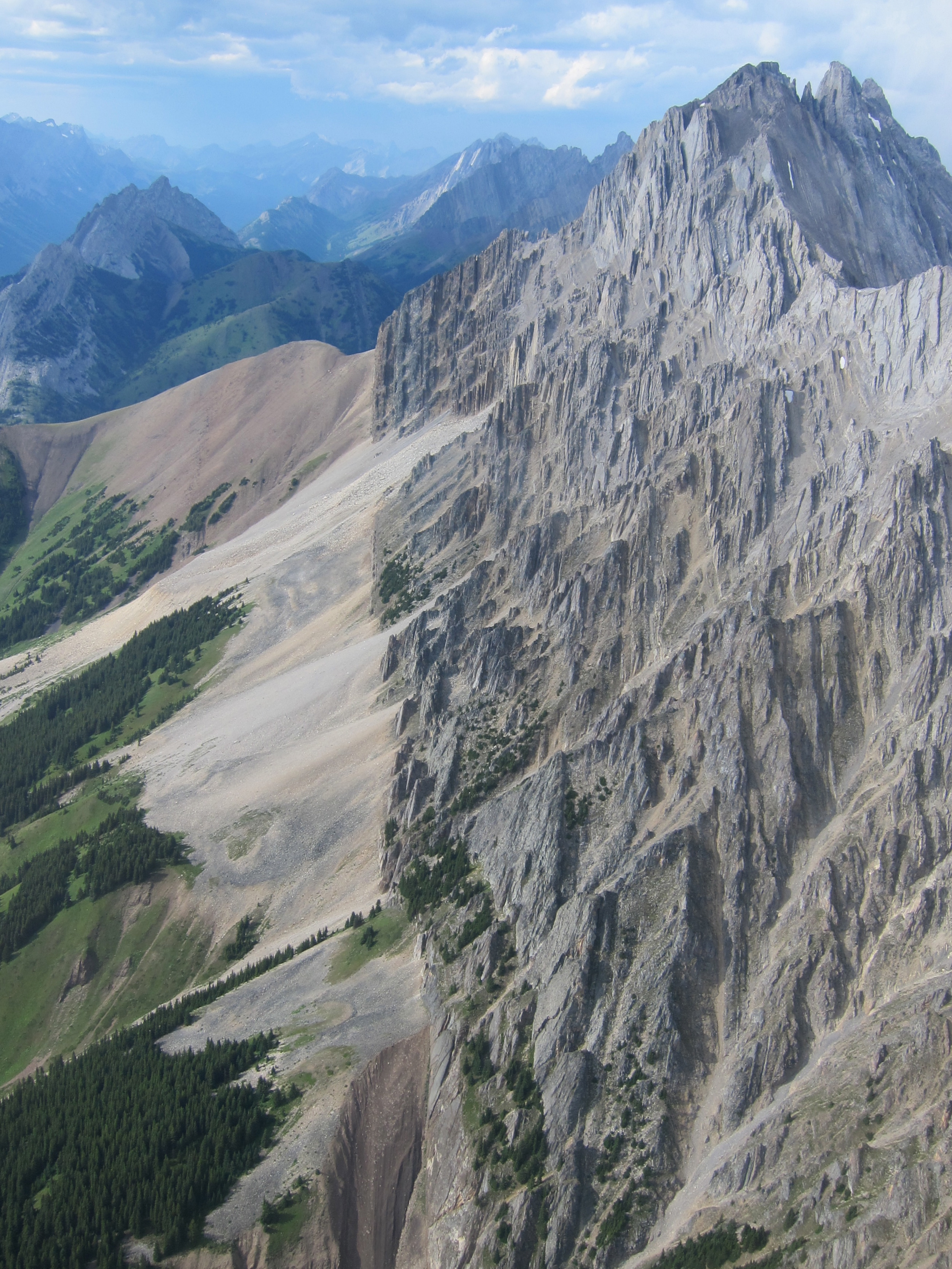
- Mist Mountain from the south

Highest point
- Elevation: 3,140 m (10,300 ft)
- Prominence: 487 m (1,598 ft)
- Listing: Mountains of Alberta
- Coordinates: 50°33′15″N 114°54′36″W

Geography
- Location within Alberta
- Country: Canada
- Province: Alberta
- Parent range: Misty Range
- Topo map: NTS 82J10 Mount Rae

Climbing
- First ascent: 1946, Donald King, Alan Blayney, Len Blayney, York Blayney
- Easiest route: Hike, but avoid 'nameless ridge'

Mist Mountain is a mountain located alongside Highway 40 in the Canadian Rockies of Alberta, Canada. It reaches an elevation of 3,140 m (10,300 ft) and is visible from Highway 40 and the Sheep River.

The mountain was named in 1884 by George M. Dawson after he experienced a prolonged period of poor weather while near the western slopes of the range.

Mist Mountain is composed of sedimentary rock that was pushed east and over the top of younger rock during the Laramide orogeny.

Hot springs near its base as well as panoramic views from the peak mean it is a popular hike for locals and tourists visiting the lower Kananaskis area.

== Climate ==
Based on the Köppen climate classification, Mist Mountain is located in a subarctic climate with cold, snowy winters, and mild summers. Temperatures can drop below −20 °C with wind chill factors below −30 °C.

In terms of favorable weather, June through September are the best months to climb Mist Mountain.

Precipitation runoff from the mountain drains into tributaries of the Highwood River.

== Gallery ==
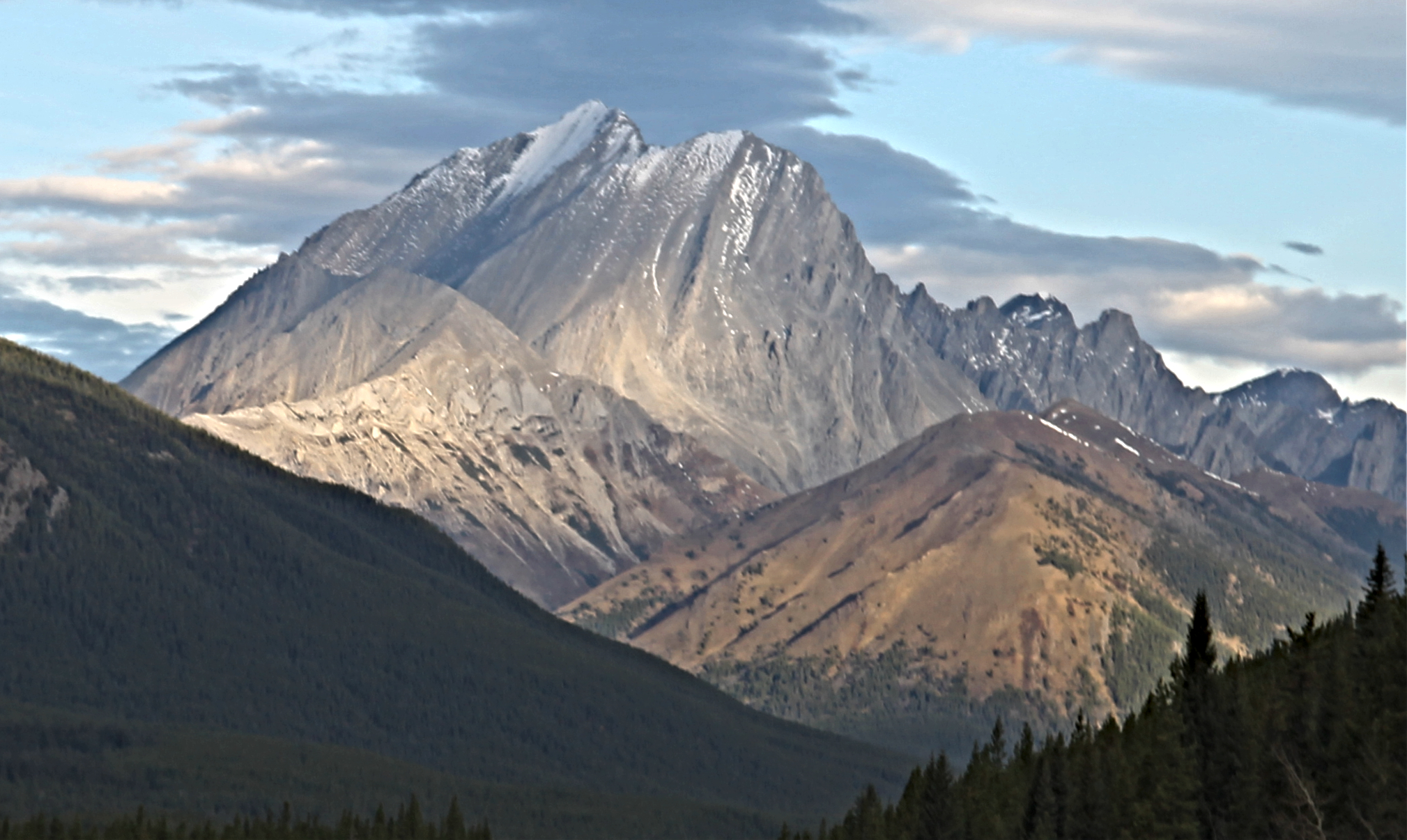
Mist Mountain seen from Highway 40

== See also ==
- Mist Mountain Formation
