= Highwood River =

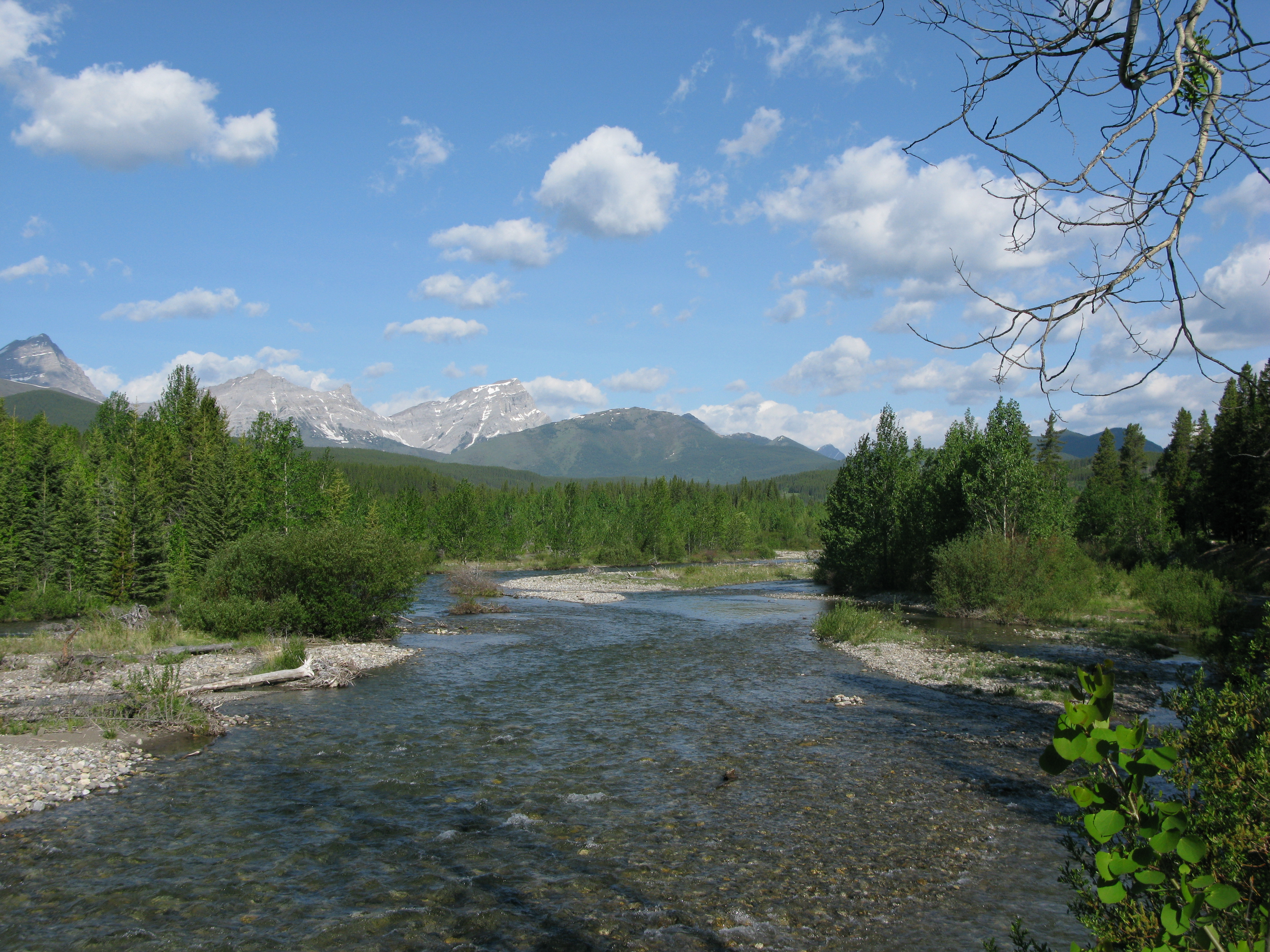
- The Highwood from Alberta Highway 40

Location
- Country: Canada
- Province: Alberta

Physical characteristics
- Source
  - location: Peter Lougheed Provincial Park
  - coordinates: 50.61032°N 114.97613°W
  - elevation: 2,500 meters (8,200 ft)
- Mouth
  - location: Bow River
  - coordinates: 50.81743°N 113.77892°W
  - elevation: 950 meters (3,120 ft)

The Highwood River is a tributary of the Bow River in southwestern Alberta, Canada.

== Course ==
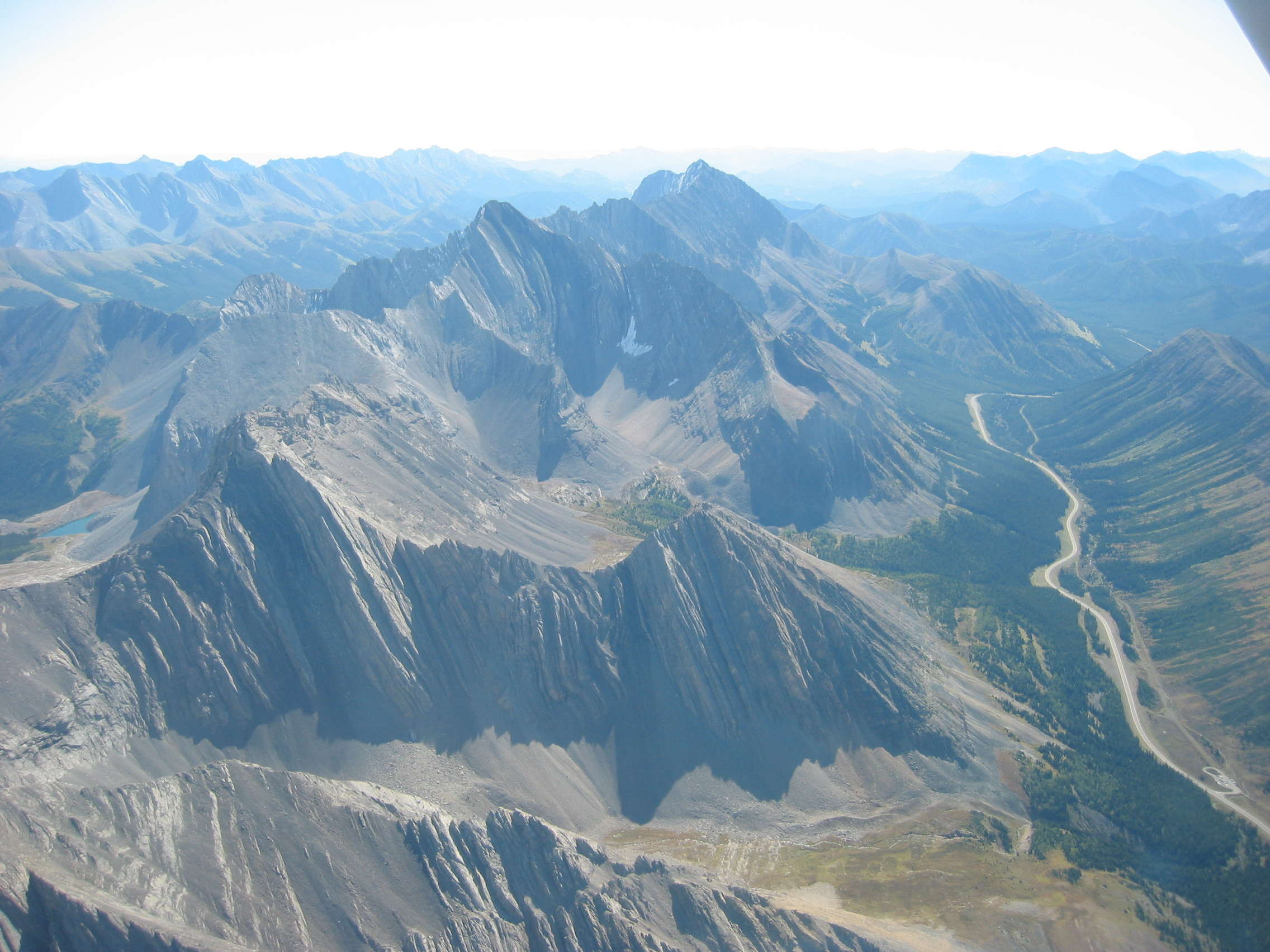
The Highwood River gathers water from the slopes of Mount Arethusa and flows along the Kananaskis Trail

The Highwood originates in the Canadian Rockies in Peter Lougheed Provincial Park, in the Highwood Pass below Mount Arethusa. It flows south and is paralleled by the Kananaskis Trail between Elbow-Sheep Wildland Provincial Park, Don Getty Wildland Provincial Park, and Emerson Creek Park. It turns east and flows along Highway 541 and through the community of Longview. Continuing east, it passes through High River, ending when it enters the Bow River southeast of Calgary.

== Recreation ==
The river is known for flyfishing. A variety of trout species live in the river, including native bull trout. In springtime when the snow is melting the river offers white water rafting.

== Flooding ==
The Highwood River is subject to frequent flooding. Flood events of exceptional magnitude occurred in 1894, 1899, 1902, 1908, 1912, 1923, 1929, 1932, 1942, 1995, 2005 and 2013. Most recently during the 2013 Alberta floods, thousands of people in Alberta were ordered to evacuate their homes after the rise of the Highwood River, Bow River, Elbow River and numerous others. Three people died as a result of the flooding of the Highwood River.

== Tributaries and features ==
From origin to mouth, the Highwood River receives the following tributaries or passes through these geographic features:

| Tributary or feature | Location | Remarks |
|---|---|---|
| Storm Creek | 50.56597°N 114.95302°W | left tributary from Storm Mountain |
| Kananaskis Trail | 50.54084°N 114.94909°W | Bridge |
| Mist Creek | 50.51388°N 114.83849°W | left tributary from Mist Mountain |
| Picklejar Creek | 50.50687°N 114.82833°W | left tributary |
| Loomis Creek | 50.46714°N 114.78512°W | right tributary |
| McPhail Creek | 50.41631°N 114.74539°W | right tributary |
| Cat Creek | 50.40797°N 114.71243°W | left tributary |
| Strawberry Creek | 50.38248°N 114.67775°W | right tributary |
| Fitzsimmons Creek | 50.37914°N 114.65781°W | right tributary |
| Etherington Creek | 50.37944°N 114.64946°W | right tributary |
| Stony Creek | 50.38832°N 114.61922°W | left tributary |
| Cataract Creek | 50.38986°N 114.58254°W | right tributary |
| Zephyr Creek | 50.38977°N 114.57551°W | right tributary |
| Marston Creek | 50.40470°N 114.50136°W | left tributary |
| Deep Creek | 50.42343°N 114.46994°W | left tributary |
| Eden Valley Indian reserve 216 | 50.42061°N 114.47585°W | enters reserve |
| Eden Valley Indian Reserve 216 | 50.45863°N 114.42421°W | leaves reserve |
| Waldie Creek | 50.47466°N 114.41978°W | left tributary |
| Trap Creek | 50.47849°N 114.41952°W | left tributary |
| Sullivan Creek | 50.53074°N 114.38507°W | left tributary |
| Ings Creek | 50.55979°N 114.33701°W | left tributary |
| Longview | 50.53301°N 114.24000°W | enters town limits |
| Cowboy Trail | 50.52346°N 114.23348°W | bridge |
| Bull Creek | 50.50548°N 114.23275°W | right tributary |
| Pekisko Creek | 50.48207°N 114.12843°W | right tributary |
| High River | 50.57573°N 113.90574°W | enters town limits |
| Highway 2A | 50.58308°N 113.87239°W | road and railroad bridge |
| Tongue Creek | 50.63876°N 113.87181°W | left tributary |
| CPR | 50.65727°N 113.85934°W | railroad bridge |
| Highway 2 | 50.66836°N 113.86222°W | bridge |
| Highway 547 | 50.69705°N 113.86396°W | bridge |
| Sheep River | 50.74024°N 113.85580°W | left tributary |
| Highway 552 | 50.78368°N 113.82126°W | bridge |
| Bow River | 50.81898°N 113.77845°W | river mouth as right tributary of Bow River |

== See also ==
- List of rivers of Alberta
