= Highwood Pass =

Mountain pass in Alberta, Canada

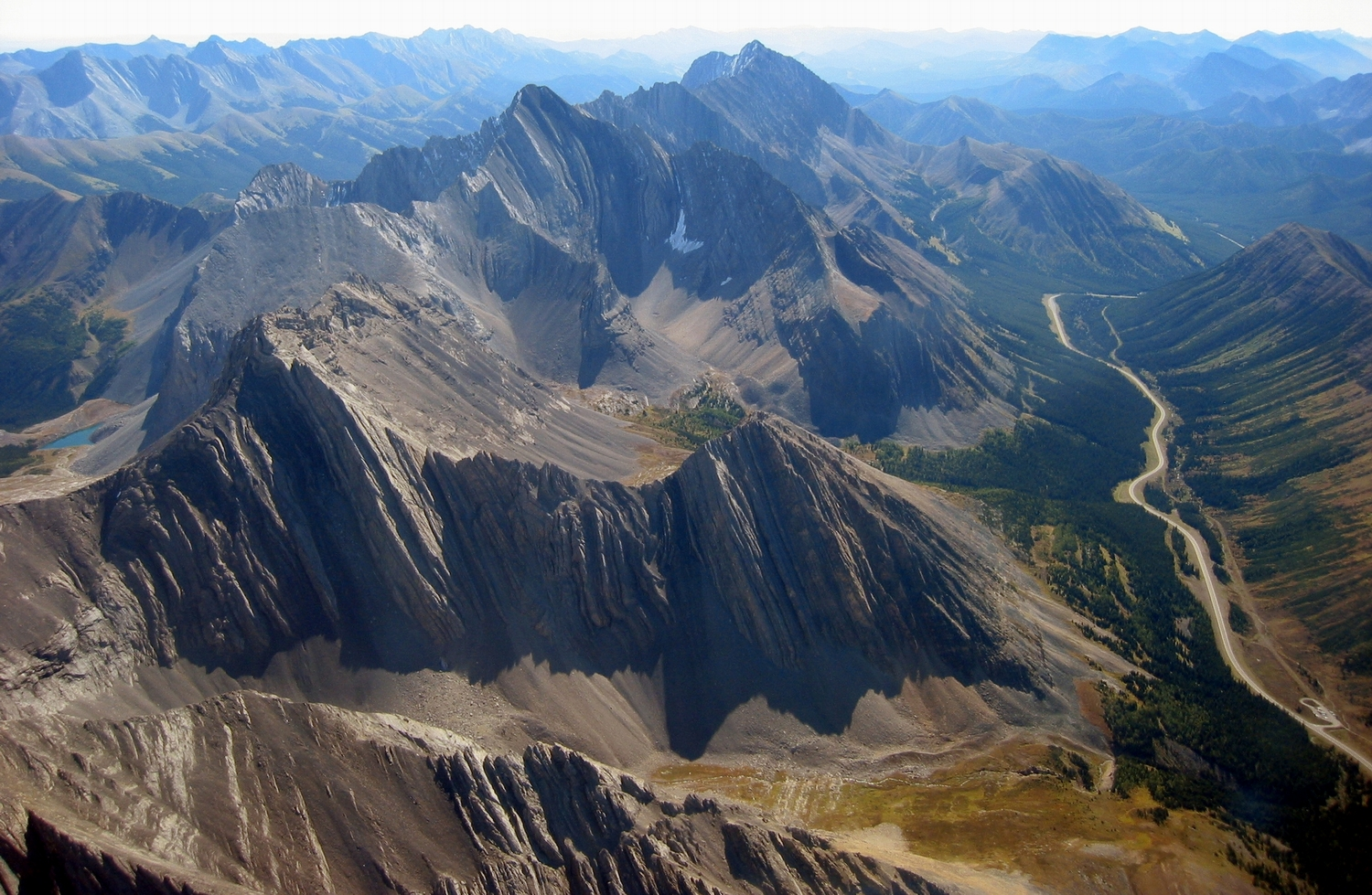
- Misty Range towering above Kananaskis Trail in the Highwood Pass

- Location within Alberta
- Elevation: 2,206 m (7,238 ft)
- Traversed by: Kananaskis Trail

Location
- Location: Kananaskis, Alberta, Canada
- Range: Misty Range
- Coordinates: 50°35′58″N 114°59′16″W
- Topo map: NTS 82J10 Mount Rae

Highwood Pass is a mountain pass in Kananaskis Country, Alberta, Canada. It lies west of Mount Rae and Mount Arethusa of the Misty Range, south of Elbow Pass. It lies within Peter Lougheed Provincial Park on Alberta Highway 40 (Kananaskis Trail). Kananaskis Trail runs through the pass and offers access to campgrounds and recreational areas. The Highwood River originates in the pass.

== Tourism ==
Highwood Pass is the highest paved pass in Canada. The pass is closed each year from December 1 to June 14 due to very high snowfall and to protect wildlife. For a small portion of June, the snow is melted but the road remains closed to motor vehicles, making this a popular destination for road cyclists. During the summer, it is popular among drivers as well, said to be one of the most scenic drives in Canada.

== Gallery ==
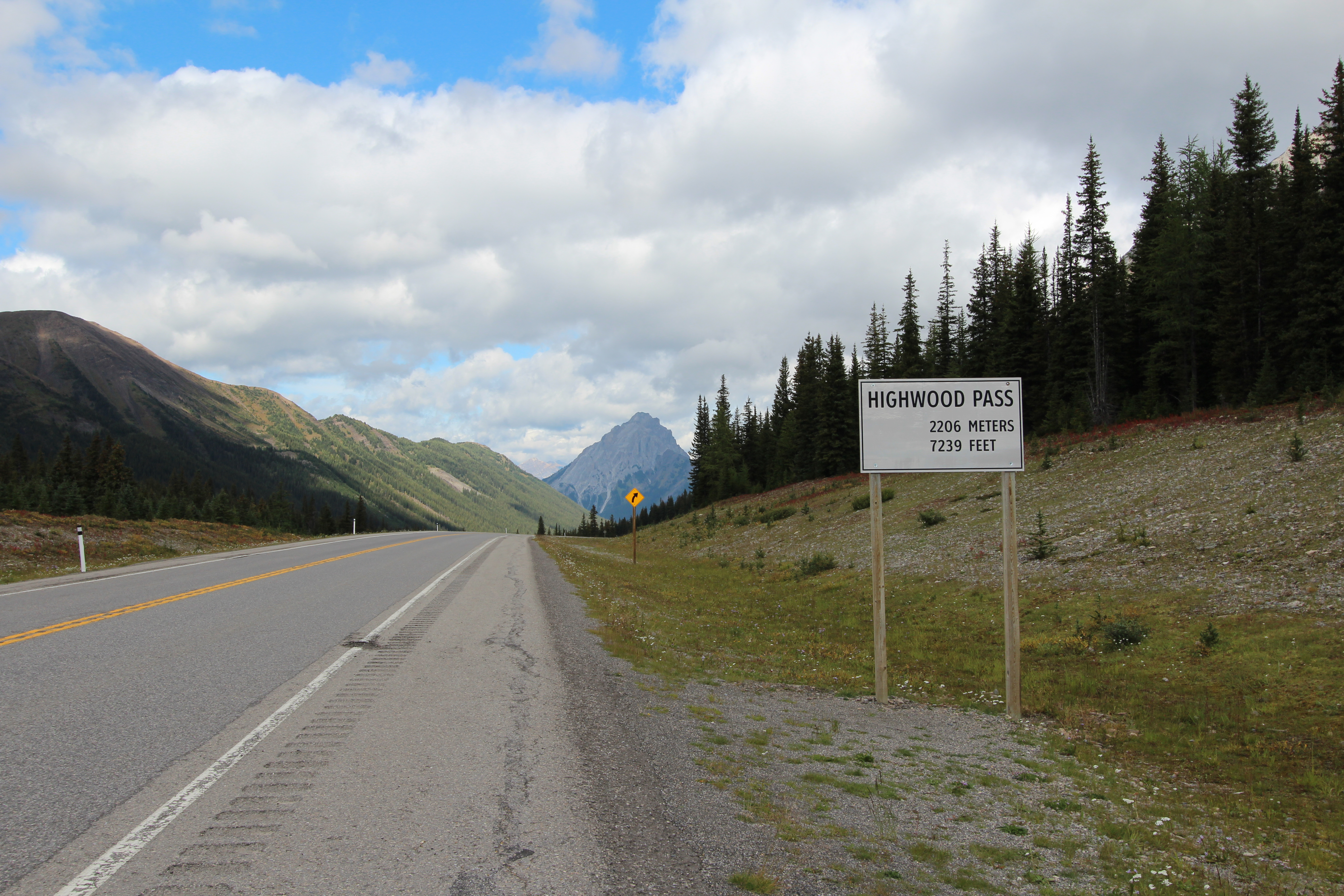
Highwood Pass from Alberta Highway 40, with a popular sign citing elevation
