= Fording River =

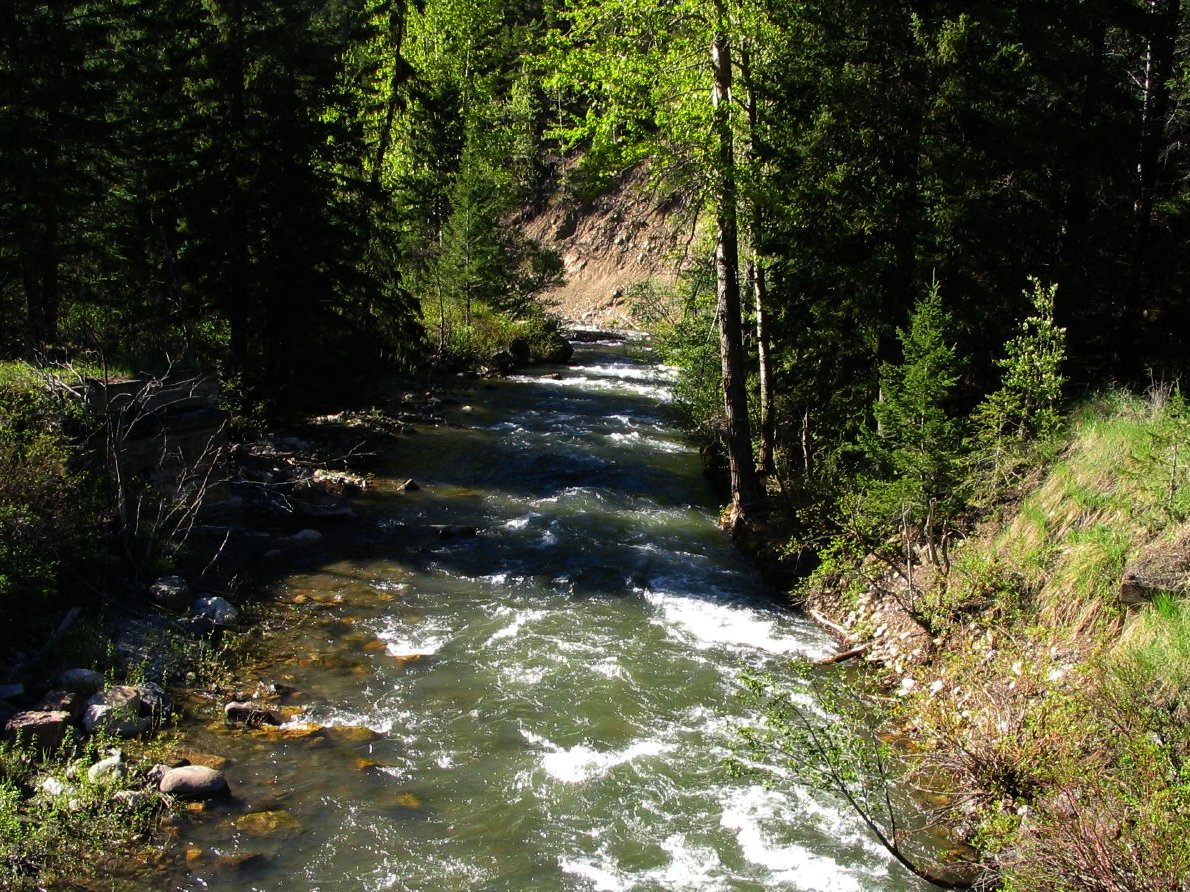
- Fording River near Sparwood, B.C.

Physical characteristics
- Mouth
  - coordinates: 49°52′57″N 114°52′36″W

The Fording River is a tributary of the Elk River in the Canadian province of British Columbia. It is part of the Columbia River basin, as the Elk River is a tributary of the Kootenay River, which is a tributary of the Columbia River.

== Course ==
The Fording River originates in the Canadian Rockies near Fording River Pass on the Continental Divide. It flows south, collecting numerous tributaries before joining the Elk River some distance north of Sparwood.

== Ecology ==
Westslope cutthroat trout is a species of conservation concern, found in the upper Fording River above Josephine Falls.

== See also ==
- Ford (crossing)
- List of rivers of British Columbia
- List of tributaries of the Columbia River
