= Mount Head (Alberta) =

Mountain in Alberta, Canada

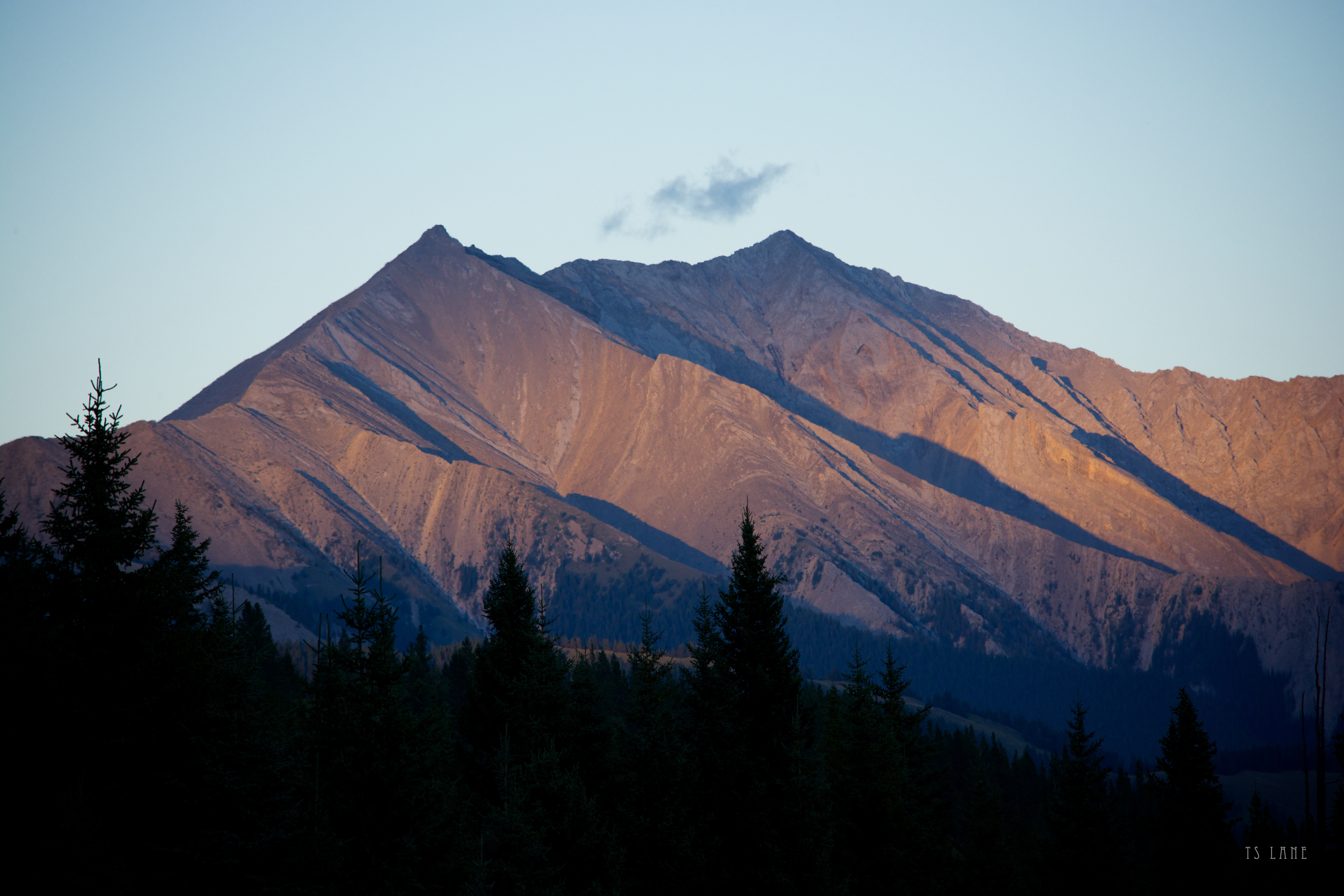
- West aspect at sunset

Highest point
- Elevation: 2,782 m (9,127 ft)
- Prominence: 403 m (1,322 ft)
- Parent peak: Lineham Ridge
- Isolation: 10.94 km (6.80 mi)
- Listing: Mountains of Alberta
- Coordinates: 50°26′25″N 114°39′00″W

Naming
- Etymology: Edmund Walker Head

Geography
- Location within Alberta Location within Canada
- Interactive map of Mount Head
- Country: Canada
- Province: Alberta
- Protected area: Don Getty Wildland Provincial Park
- Parent range: Highwood Range; Canadian Rockies
- Topo map: NTS 82J7 Mount Head

Geology
- Mountain type: Fault block
- Rock type: Sedimentary rock

Climbing
- First ascent: 1934 by Raymond M. Patterson
- Easiest route: Scramble

Mount Head is a 2,782-metre (9,127-foot) mountain summit located in Alberta, Canada.

== Description ==
Mount Head is situated 83 km (52 mi) southwest of Calgary near the southern end of the Highwood Range which is a subrange of the Canadian Rockies. The peak is set 14 km (8.7 mi) east of the Continental Divide, in Don Getty Wildland Provincial Park. Precipitation runoff from the mountain drains into tributaries of the Highwood River. Topographic relief is significant as the summit rises 1,200 m (3,900 ft) above the Highwood Valley in 5 km (3.1 mi). The mountain can be seen from Highway 40 and Highway 541.

== History ==
The mountain was named in 1859 by John Palliser to honor Edmund Walker Head (1805–1868), the Governor General of the Province of Canada who had provided support for the Palliser expedition. The mountain's toponym was officially adopted March 31, 1924, by the Geographical Names Board of Canada.

The first ascent of the summit was made in 1934 by Raymond M. Patterson. The peak immediately northwest of Mt. Head on the opposite side of Head Creek is officially named "Patterson's Peak" in his honor.

== Geology ==
Mount Head was created during the Lewis Overthrust. The peak is underlain by folded and thrust-faulted sedimentary rock laid down during the Mesozoic and Paleozoic eras. Formed in shallow seas, this sedimentary rock was pushed east and over the top of younger rock during the Laramide orogeny. The Mount Head Formation formed during the Viséan age.

== Climate ==
Based on the Köppen climate classification, Mount Head is located in a subarctic climate zone with cold, snowy winters, and mild summers. Winter temperatures can drop below −20 °C with wind chill factors below −30 °C. The months June through September offer the most favorable weather to climb or view Mount Head.

== Gallery ==
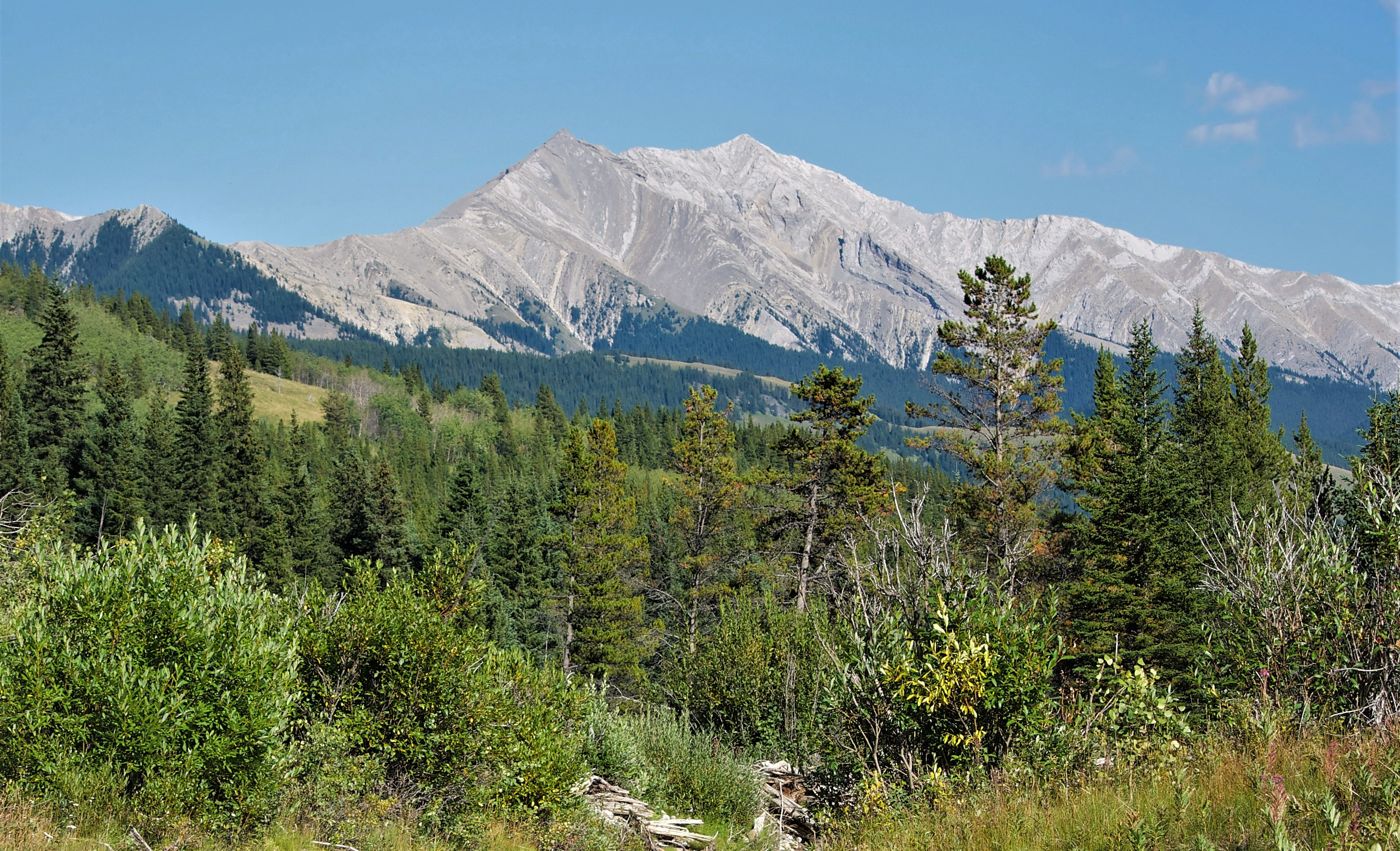
West aspect

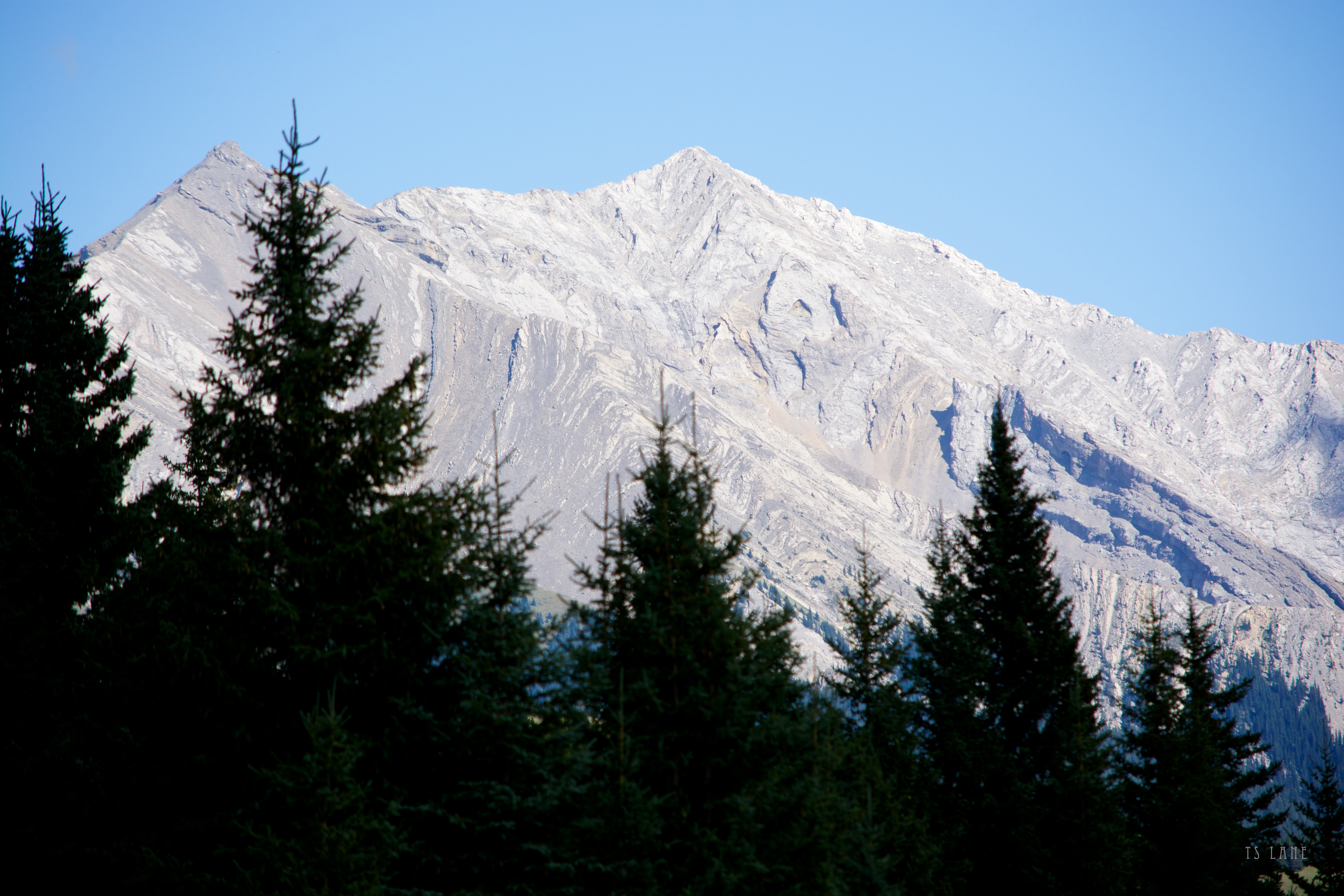
West aspect

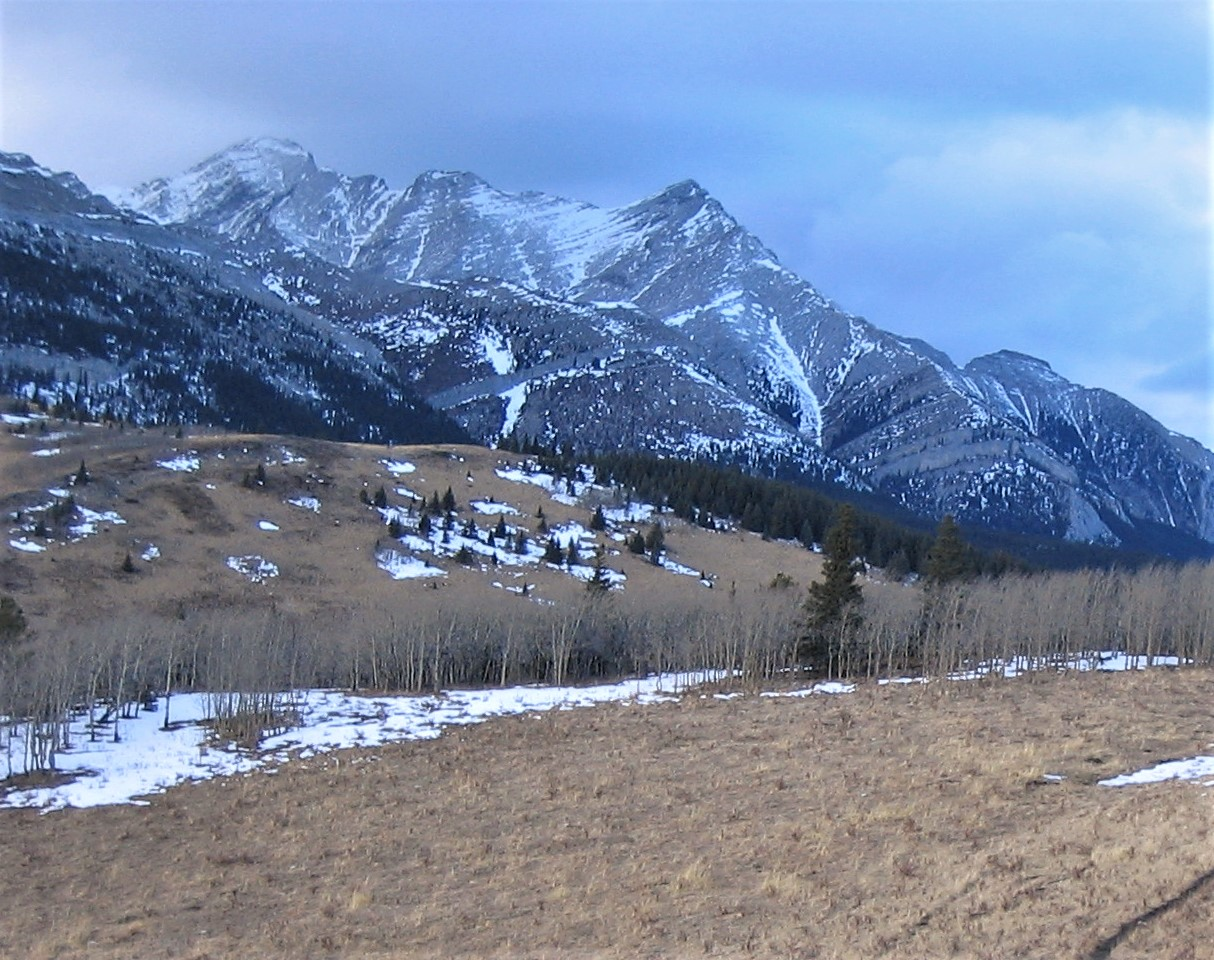
Southeast aspect

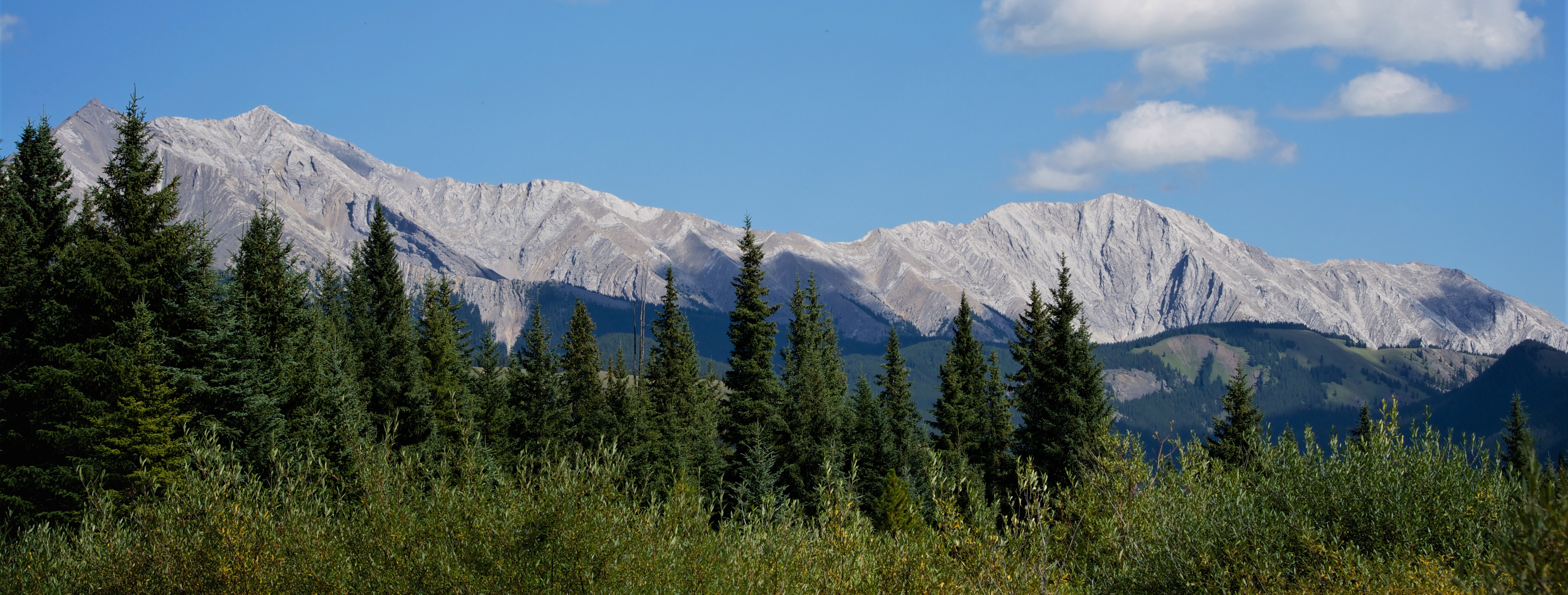
Mt. Head (left) with Holy Cross Mountain (right) from Highwood Valley

== See also ==
- Kananaskis Country
- Geography of Alberta
