= Mount Rae =

Mountain in Alberta, Canada

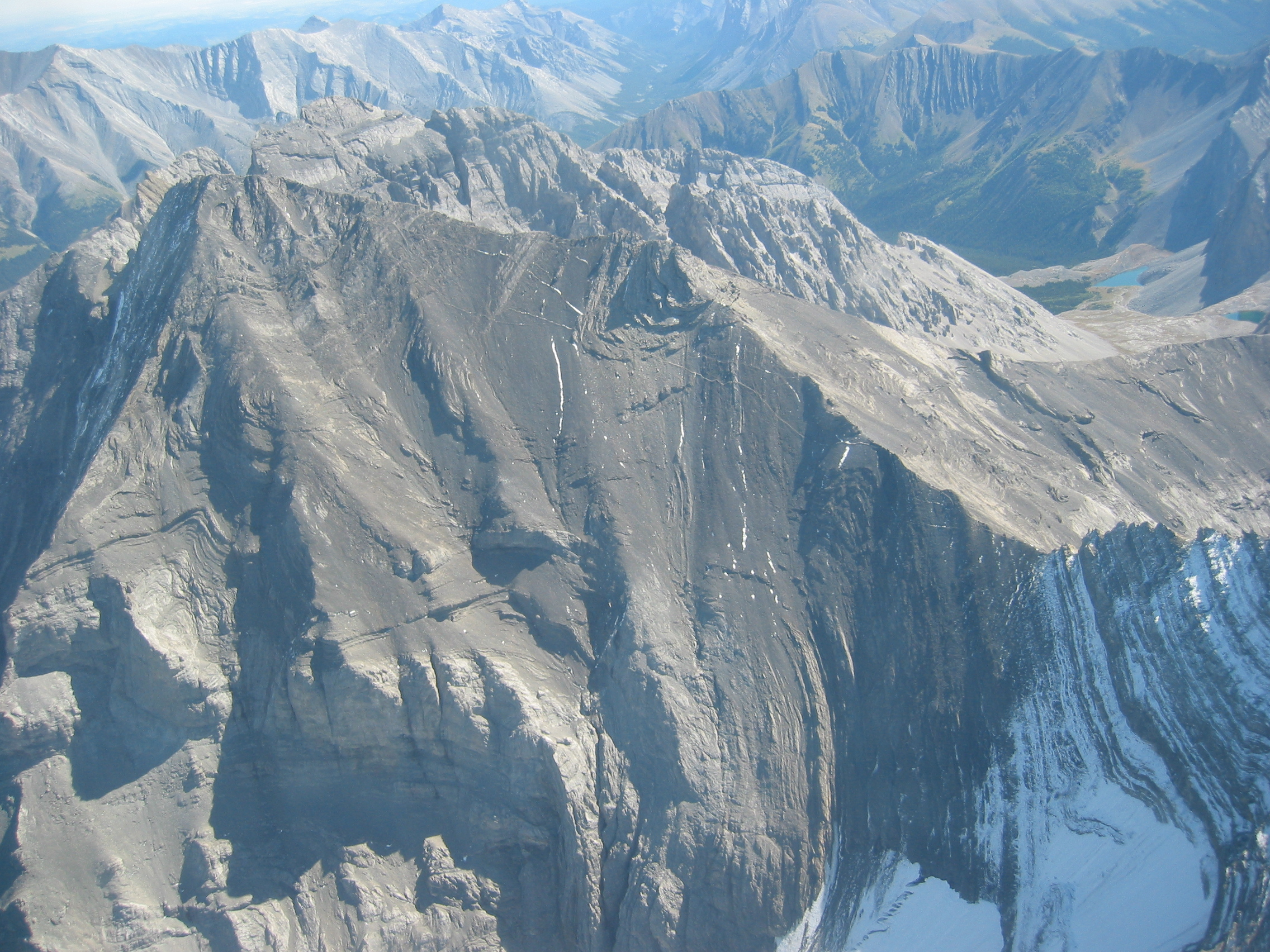
- Mt. Rae from the north (Sept. 2006)

Highest point
- Elevation: 3,218 m (10,558 ft)
- Prominence: 1,330 m (4,360 ft)
- Parent peak: Mount Joffre 3433 m
- Listing: Mountains of Alberta
- Coordinates: 50°37′22″N 114°58′29″W

Geography
- Location within Alberta
- Country: Canada
- Province: Alberta
- Parent range: Misty Range
- Topo map: NTS 82J10 Mount Rae

Climbing
- Easiest route: Moderate scramble

Mount Rae is a mountain located on the eastern side of Highway 40 between Elbow Pass and the Ptarmigan Cirque in the Canadian Rockies of Alberta. Mount Rae was named after John Rae, explorer of Northern Canada, in 1859.

Due to its relatively high summit and modest elevation gain from Highwood Pass, Mount Rae is a very popular scrambling objective. The scramble starts at the Highwood Pass parking lot on Highway 40 (2,227 m (7,306 ft)) and proceeds to the back of the Ptarmigan Cirque. Two options from this point are either ascending a steep snow field or climbing progressively steeper slabs to the col. Once on the col (connecting the main summit of Rae with an unnamed peak), the route ascends on the northern side to the narrow summit ridge. In snowy conditions, sticking close to the summit ridge and passing an upcoming massive gendarme is the standard route. In dry conditions, the gendarme can be bypassed on slopes beneath it.

== Gallery ==
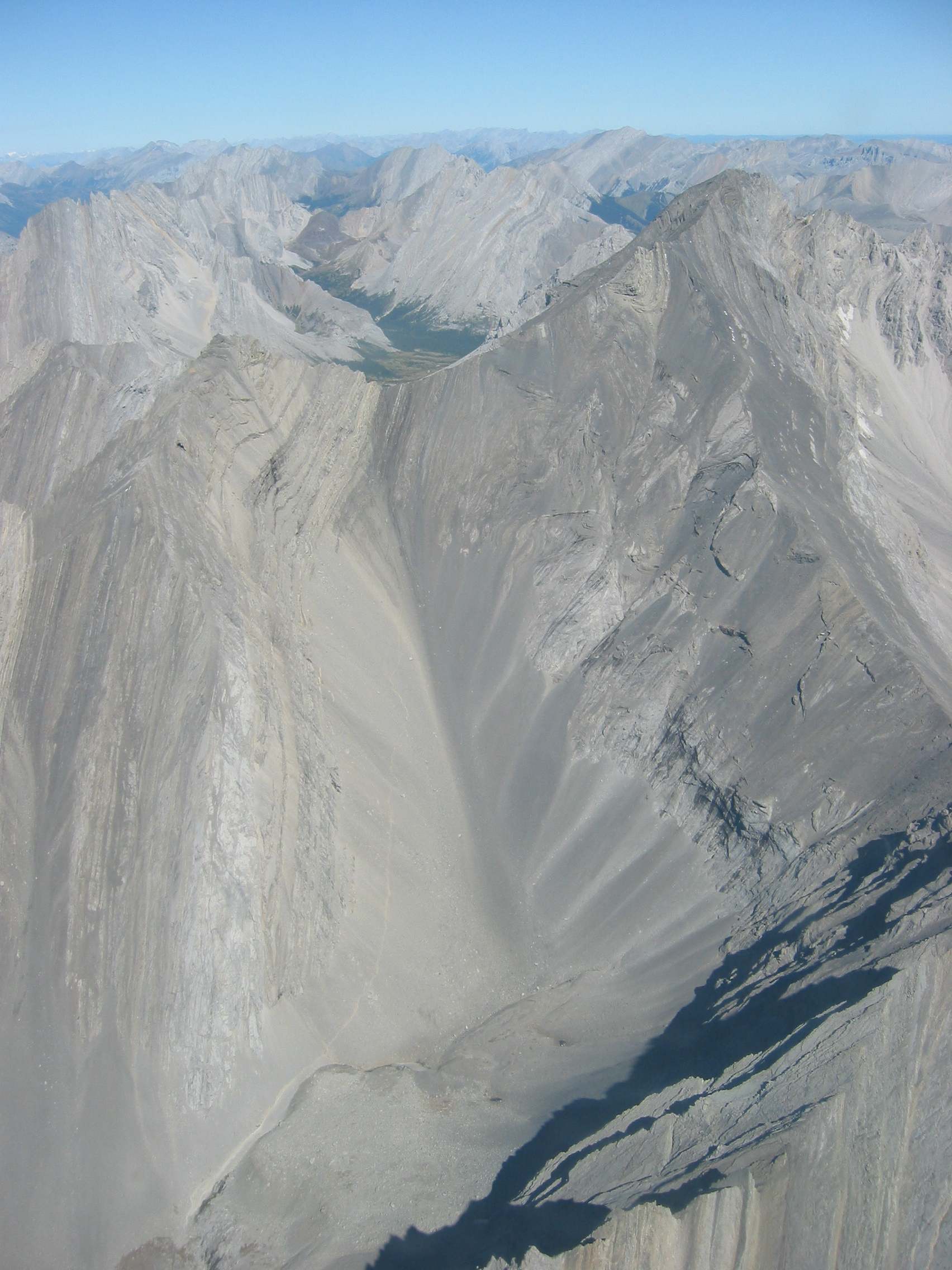
Mount Rae from the South

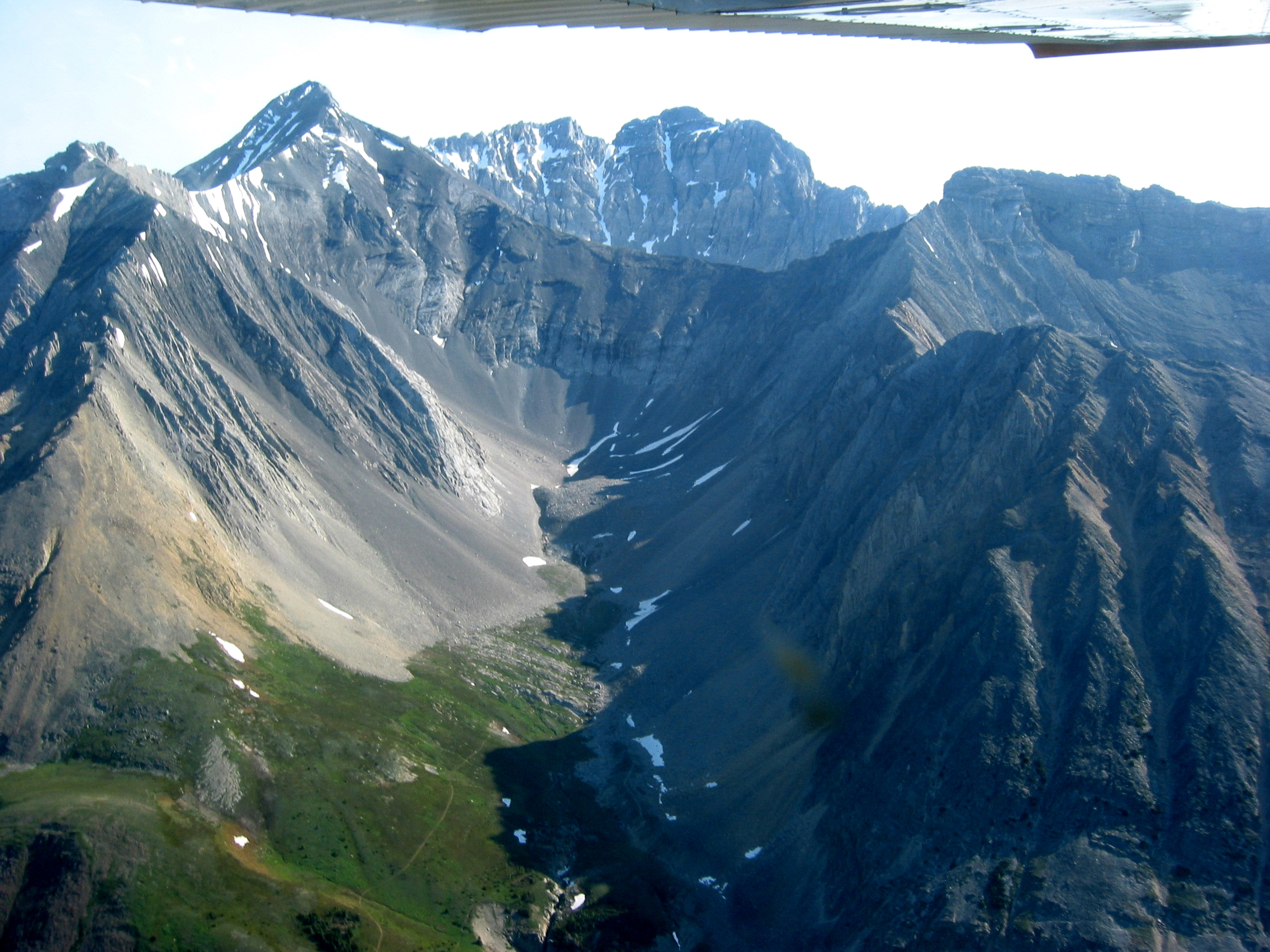
Mount Rae (middle left) from Highwood Pass
