= Mount Swiderski =

Mountain in British Columbia, Canada

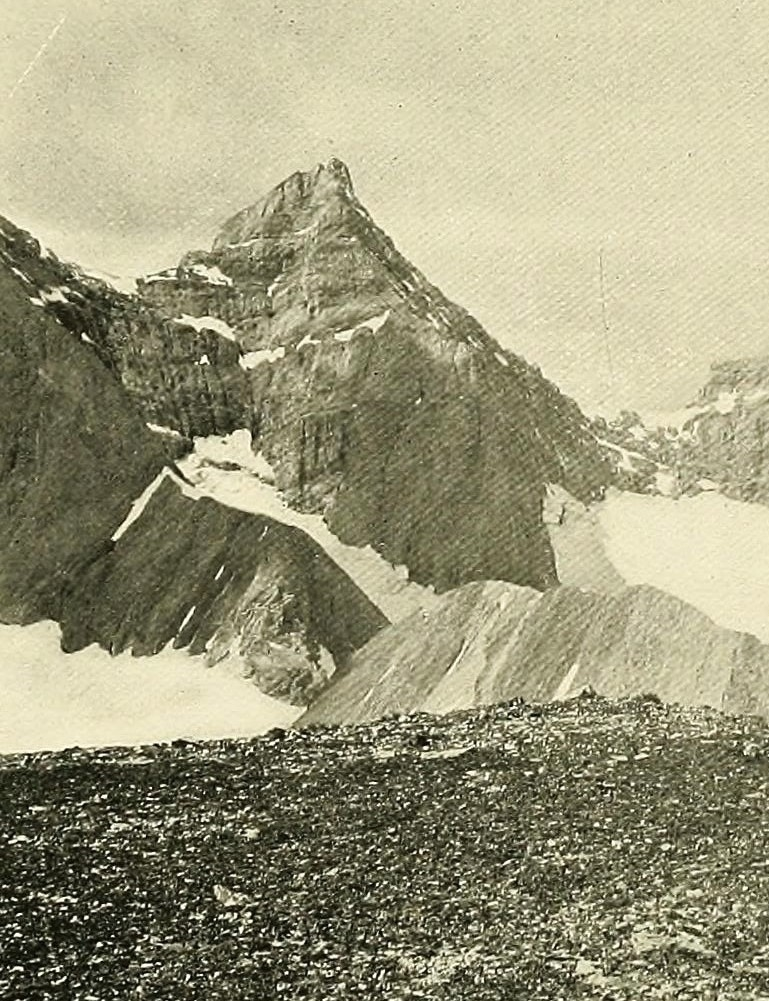
- East aspect, circa 1902

Highest point
- Elevation: 3,133 m (10,279 ft)
- Prominence: 207 m (679 ft)
- Parent peak: Mount Cadorna (3,145 m)
- Listing: Mountains of British Columbia
- Coordinates: 50°28′12″N 115°09′23″W

Geography
- Location within British Columbia Location within Canada
- Country: Canada
- Province: British Columbia
- District: Kootenay Land District
- Protected area: Height of the Rockies Prov. Park; Elk Lakes Provincial Park
- Parent range: Italian Group ← Canadian Rockies
- Topo map: NTS 82J6 Mount Abruzzi

Geology
- Rock age: Cambrian
- Rock type: sedimentary rock

Climbing
- First ascent: 2005
- Easiest route: Mountaineering

Mount Swiderski is a 3,133-metre (10,279-foot) mountain summit in British Columbia, Canada.

== Description ==
Mount Swiderski is set on the common boundary shared by Height of the Rockies Provincial Park and Elk Lakes Provincial Park. It is part of the "Italian Group" which is a subrange of the Canadian Rockies. Mount Battisti rises one kilometre to the north-northwest and the nearest higher neighbor is Mount Cadorna, 0.8 km (0.50 mi) to the southeast. Precipitation runoff from the mountain's west slope drains into the White River and the east slope drains into headwaters of Cadorna Creek which is a tributary of the Elk River. Topographic relief is significant as the summit rises over 1,500 metres (4,900 feet) above the White River in two kilometres (1.2 mile). Mt. Swiderski is composed of sedimentary rock laid down during the Cambrian period. Formed in shallow seas, this sedimentary rock was pushed east and over the top of younger rock during the Laramide orogeny.

== History ==
The mountain's toponym was officially adopted on September 2, 1964, by the Geographical Names Board of Canada to remember Royal Canadian Air Force Flight Sergeant Alexander Swiderski (January 3, 1915 – June 12, 1942) from Fernie, who was killed when his plane was shot down during World War II.

The first ascent of the summit was made on July 29, 2005, by Rick Collier, John Holmes, and Martin Taylor.

== Climate ==
Based on the Köppen climate classification, Mount Swiderski is located in a subarctic climate zone with cold, snowy winters, and mild summers. Winter temperatures can drop below −20 °C (–4 °F) with wind chill factors below −30 °C (–22 °F). This climate supports an unnamed glacier below the peak's north and east faces. The months of July through September offer the most favorable weather for climbing this peak.

== See also ==
- Geography of British Columbia
- Geology of British Columbia
