= Elk Lakes =

Elk Lakes may refer to:

- Elk Lakes (British Columbia), Canada
  - Elk Lakes Provincial Park, the provincial park surrounding the lakes
  - Elk Lakes cabin, an alpine hut near the lakes.

== See also ==
- Elk Lake (disambiguation)
