= Elk Lake =

Elk Lake may refer to:

- Elk Lake, Ontario, a community in James township, Ontario
  - Elk Lake Airport
  - Elk Lake Water Aerodrome
- Elk Lake School District, in Dimock, Susquehanna County, Pennsylvania
- Elk Lake Township, Grant County, Minnesota

Elk Lake may refer to the following lakes:

- Elk Lake (Kentucky)
- Elk Lake (Michigan), in northern Michigan
- Elk Lake in Clearwater County, Minnesota, headwaters of the Mississippi River, south of Lake Itasca
- Elk Lake (Douglas County, Minnesota), a lake in Douglas County
- Elk Lake (Grant County, Minnesota)
- Elk Lake in Missoula County, Montana
- Elk Lake in Park County, Montana
- Elk Lake in Wheatland County, Montana
- Elk Lake (New York)
- Elk Lake (Oregon)
- Elk Lake (Sawtooth Wilderness)
- Elk Lake (British Columbia), in Saanich, British Columbia

== See also ==
- Elk Lakes (disambiguation)
- Ełk Lake, Poland
