= Mount Battisti =

Mountain in British Columbia, Canada

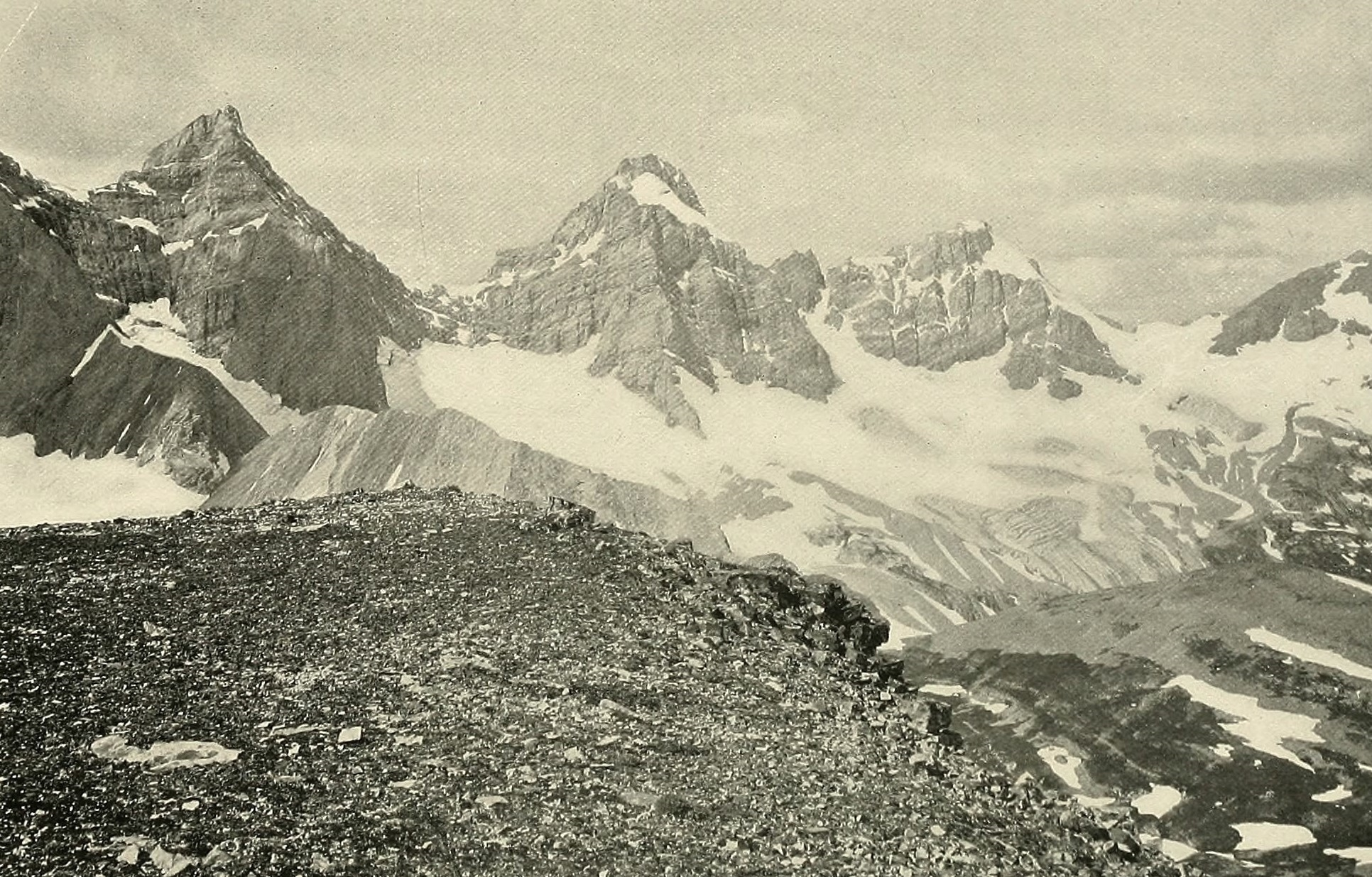
- East aspect, centered, circa 1902 (Mount Swiderski to the left)

Highest point
- Elevation: 3,155 m (10,351 ft)
- Prominence: 419 m (1,375 ft)
- Parent peak: Mount Joffre (3,450 m)
- Listing: Mountains of British Columbia
- Coordinates: 50°28′38″N 115°09′49″W

Naming
- Etymology: Cesare Battisti

Geography
- Location within British Columbia Location within Canada
- Country: Canada
- Province: British Columbia
- District: Kootenay Land District
- Protected area: Height of the Rockies Prov. Park; Elk Lakes Provincial Park
- Parent range: Italian Group ← Canadian Rockies
- Topo map: NTS 82J6 Mount Abruzzi

Geology
- Rock age: Cambrian
- Rock type: sedimentary rock

Mount Battisti is a 3,155-metre (10,351-foot) mountain summit in British Columbia, Canada.

== Description ==
Mount Battisti is set on the common boundary shared by Height of the Rockies Provincial Park and Elk Lakes Provincial Park. It is part of the "Italian Group" which is a subrange of the Canadian Rockies. The nearest higher neighbor is Mount Nivelle, 4.67 km (2.90 mi) to the north-northwest. Precipitation runoff from the mountain's west slope drains into the White River and the east slope drains into headwaters of Cadorna Creek which is a tributary of the Elk River. Topographic relief is significant as the summit rises over 1,500 metres (4,900 feet) above the White River in two kilometres (1.2 mile). Mt. Battisti is composed of sedimentary rock laid down during the Cambrian period. Formed in shallow seas, this sedimentary rock was pushed east and over the top of younger rock during the Laramide orogeny. The mountain's toponym was applied in 1918 to commemorate Italian alpinist Cesare Battisti (1875–1916).

== Climate ==
Based on the Köppen climate classification, Mount Battisti is located in a subarctic climate zone with cold, snowy winters, and mild summers. Winter temperatures can drop below −20 °C (–4 °F) with wind chill factors below −30 °C (–22 °F). This climate supports small unnamed glaciers below the peak's north and east faces. The months of July through September offer the most favorable weather for climbing this peak.

== See also ==
- Geography of British Columbia
- Geology of British Columbia
