= Mount Worthington =

Mountain in Alberta and British Columbia, Canada

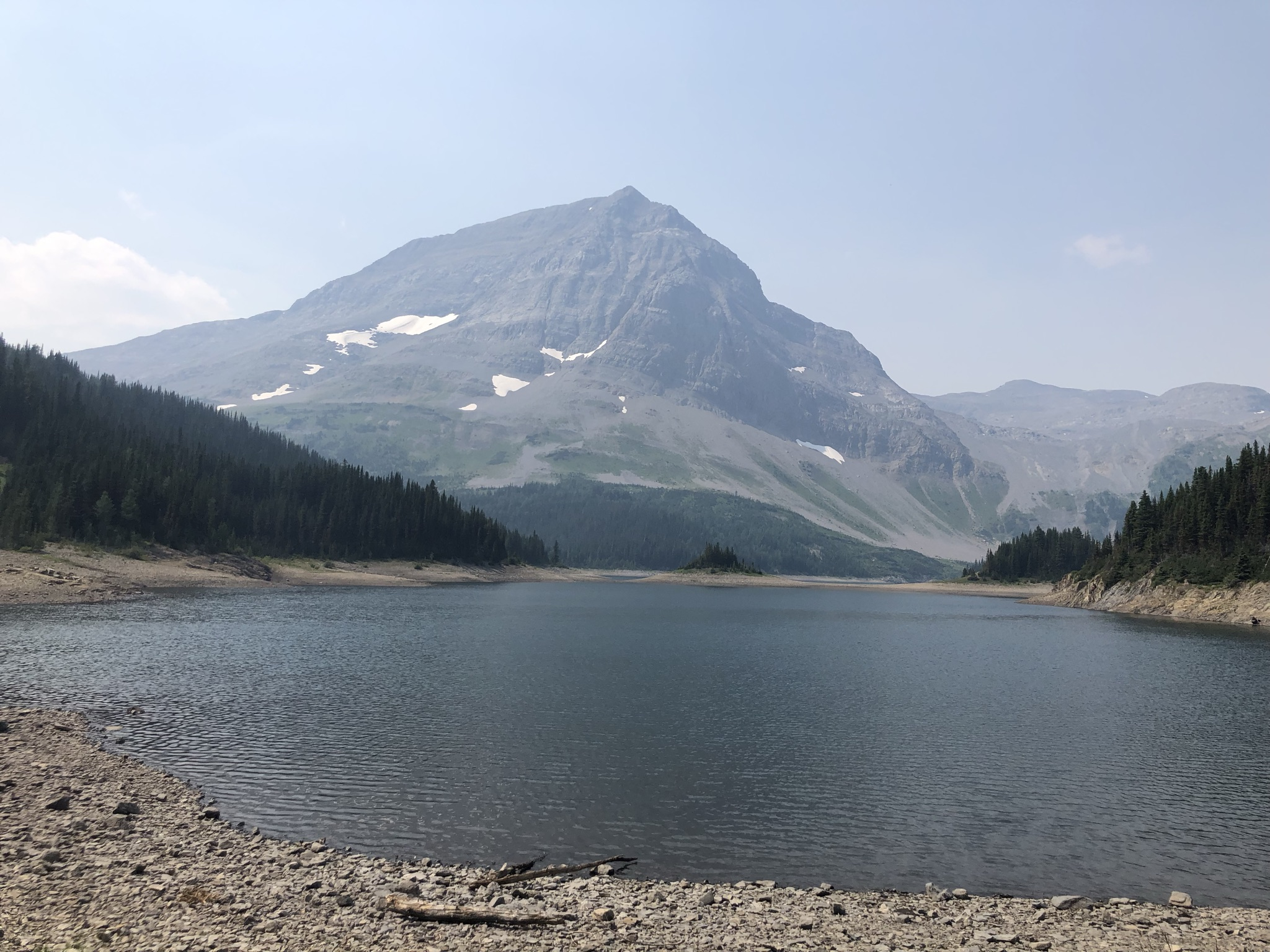
- Mount Worthington with Three Isle Lake in the foreground

Highest point
- Elevation: 2,915 m (9,564 ft)
- Prominence: 385 m (1,263 ft)
- Parent peak: Mount Lyautey (3045 m)
- Listing: Mountains of Alberta; Mountains of British Columbia
- Coordinates: 50°37′36″N 115°17′50″W

Geography
- Location within Alberta Location within British Columbia Location within Canada
- Country: Canada
- Provinces: Alberta and British Columbia
- District: Kootenay Land District
- Protected area: Height of the Rockies Provincial Park
- Parent range: Spray Mountains
- Topo map: NTS 82J11 Kananaskis Lakes

Mount Worthington is located on the eastern side of Mount McHarg, in Height of the Rockies Provincial Park, and straddles the Continental Divide marking the Alberta-British Columbia border. It was named in 1956 after Lt. Col. Don Worthington who was killed in action in 1944 during the Second World War while commanding the 7th Battalion, The British Columbia Regiment.

== See also ==
- List of peaks on the Alberta–British Columbia border
