= Warrior Mountain (Canada) =

Mountain in Alberta and British Columbia, Canada

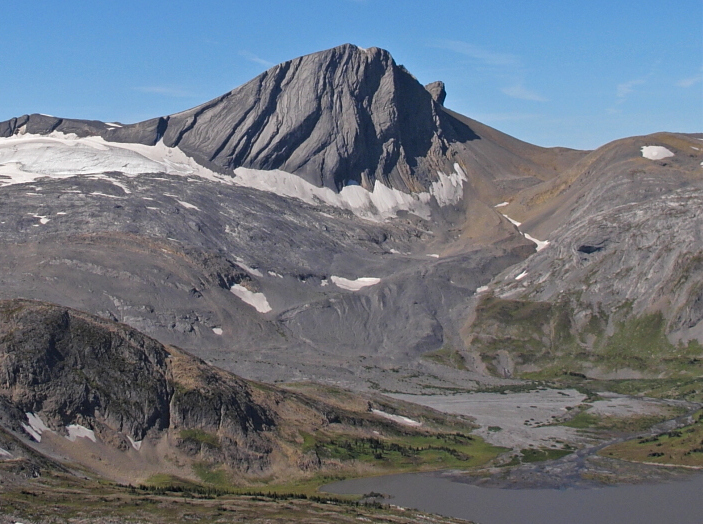

Highest point
- Elevation: 2,973 m (9,754 ft)
- Prominence: 102 m (335 ft)
- Parent peak: Mount Cordonnier (3012 m)
- Listing: Mountains of Alberta; Mountains of British Columbia
- Coordinates: 50°34′08″N 115°14′18″W

Geography
- Location within Alberta Location within British Columbia Location within Canada
- Country: Canada
- Provinces: Alberta and British Columbia
- District: Kootenay Land District
- Protected area: Height of the Rockies Provincial Park
- Topo map: NTS 82J11 Kananaskis Lakes

Climbing
- First ascent: 1930 by Katie Gardiner, Walter Fuez
- Easiest route: Scrambling Routes

Warrior Mountain is located north of Mount Joffre in Height of the Rockies Provincial Park and straddles the Continental Divide marking the Alberta-British Columbia border. It was named in 1917 after HMS Warrior. The first ascent of the mountain was made in 1930 by Kate (Katie) Gardiner and Walter Feuz. The duo also made the first ascents of nearby Mount Sarrail and Mount Lyautey that same year.

== Geology ==
Warrior Mountain is composed of sedimentary rock laid down during the Precambrian to Jurassic periods. Formed in shallow seas, this sedimentary rock was pushed east and over the top of younger rock during the Laramide orogeny.

== Climate ==
Based on the Köppen climate classification, the mountain is located in a subarctic climate zone with cold, snowy winters, and mild summers. Temperatures can drop below −20 °C with wind chill factors below −30 °C.

== See also ==
- List of peaks on the Alberta–British Columbia border
