= Onslow Mountain =

Mountain in Canada

- Mount Onslow
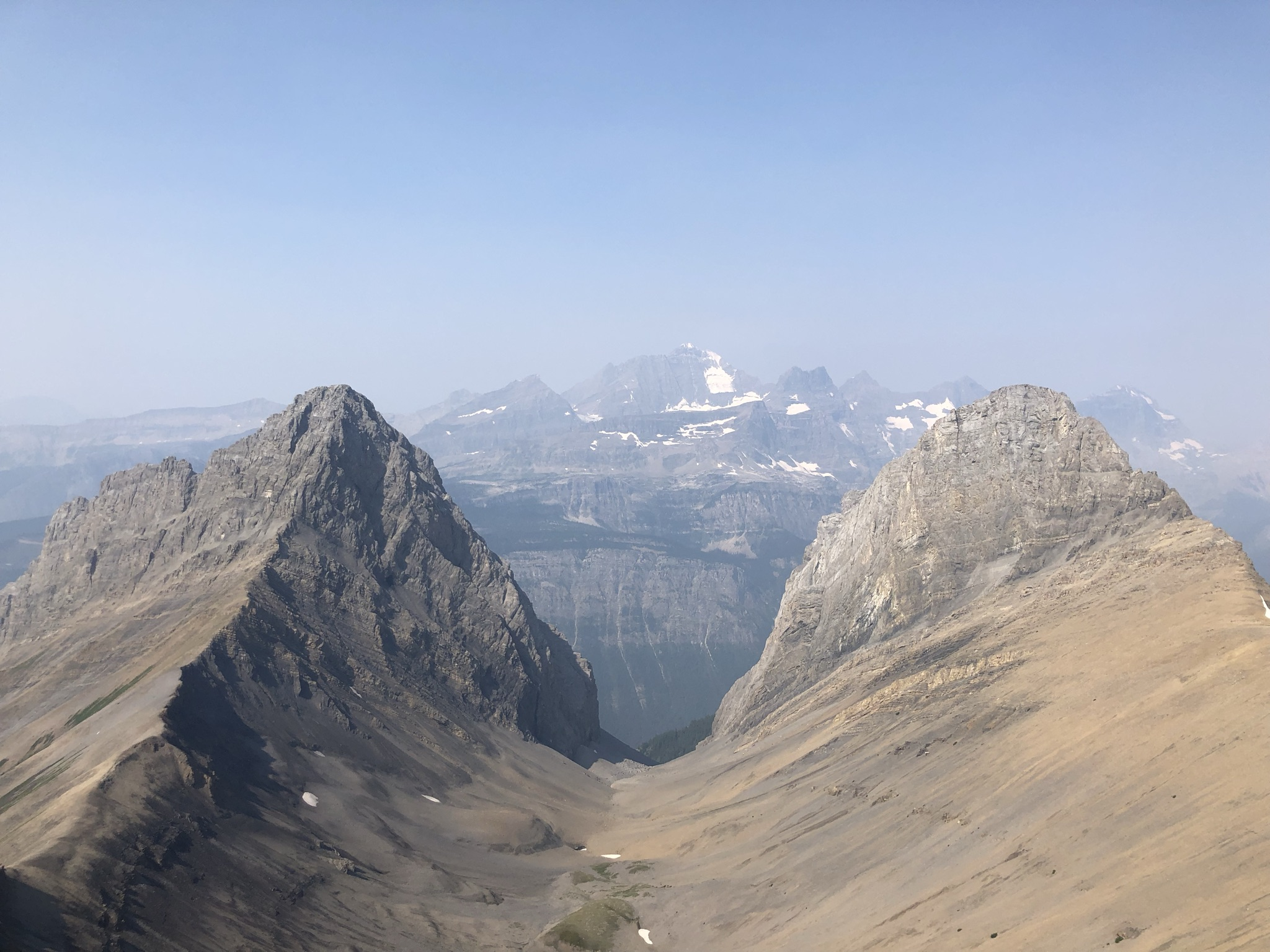
- Onslow Mountain (left) and Defender Mountain (right) frame Mount King George

Highest point
- Elevation: 2,798 m (9,180 ft); NAD83
- Prominence: 273 m (896 ft)
- Coordinates: 50°35′36″N 115°17′29″W

Naming
- Etymology: HMS Onslow (1916)

Geography
- Location within Alberta Location within British Columbia Location within Canada
- Location: Alberta; British Columbia
- Country: Canada
- Province: Alberta and British Columbia
- Parent range: Canadian Rockies
- Topo map: NTS 82J11 Kananaskis Lakes

Onlsow Mountain is located on the border of Alberta and British Columbia on the Continental Divide.

== History ==
Onslow Mountain was named in 1917 by the Interprovincial Boundary Survey after the British Royal Navy ship HMS Onslow (1916) that took part in the Battle of Jutland in World War I. The mountain's name was officially adopted as Mount Onslow in 1924 by the Geographical Names Board of Canada and officially changed to Onslow Mountain in 1966.

== See also ==
- List of peaks on the Alberta–British Columbia border
- Mountains of Alberta
- Mountains of British Columbia
