= Elk Lakes cabin =

Mountain hut in British Columbia, Canada

- Interactive map of Elk Lakes cabin
- 50°33′3.6″N 115°04′23.4″W
- Type: alpine hut
- Location: Elk Lakes Provincial Park, British Columbia, Canada

Site notes
- Elevation: 1,720 m (5,640 ft)
- Archaeologists: BC Parks
- Owner: Alpine Club of Canada
- Public access: Reservations required Peter Lougheed Provincial Park or Elk River (British Columbia)
- Website: Official website

The Elk Lakes cabin is an alpine hut located between the French and Italian Military Groups in the Canadian Rockies. It resides near the Continental Divide in Elk Lakes Provincial Park, British Columbia. It is 62 km south of the Trans-Canada Highway in Kananaskis Country, Alberta and 104 km north of Sparwood, British Columbia. The area has hiking trails, and provides access to mountaineering objectives. In winter, ice climbs and skiing terrain with much powder abound. Elk Lakes terrain is similar to that near the Elizabeth Parker hut. The hut is maintained by the Alpine Club of Canada.

The cabin offers easy access and a wide range of hiking, skiing and climbing opportunities. In 2019, BC Parks created a competitive bidding process for operating the cabin.

== History ==
The cabin was built in 1992 to house BC Parks rangers. In 2003, BC Parks issued a request for proposals to convert the cabin to public use. The Alpine Club of Canada (ACC) was selected to expand its extensive alpine hut system, and began operating it in the summer of 2004.

Elk Lakes Cabin in Winter

== Facilities ==
Elk Lakes Cabin Interior - Kitchen Area

Heating	Wood stove
Lighting	Propane
Cooking	Propane oven, range, cookware, dishes and utensils
Sleeping	Dormitory style on foam mattresses
Capacity	14
Drinking water	Creek/snow
Human Waste	Outhouse
Dishwater	Ground sump
Garbage	Pack it out
Heat	Wood stove

Elk Lakes Cabin Interior - Living Area

The kitchen area and living room offer tables and a wood-burning stove. The sleeping quarters are in a loft. Sleepers occupy two long bunks and one shorter one.

The hut offers water buckets, axes, saws and shovels.

A tributary of Elkan Creek runs nearby. In winter, water is there and from snowmelt. Water must be purified before drinking.

Sinks are connected to the sump. It occasionally freezes, in which case grey water (strained of food particles) should be dumped within a three-metre radius of the outhouse.

The outhouse is located 10 m east of the cabin. All paper garbage and food scraps should be burned, and all other garbage and unused food carried out.

== Necessary supplies ==
- Sleeping bag
- Toilet paper
- Newspaper for lighting the fire
- Matches
- First aid kit
- 9 volt battery for the smoke detector

== Activities ==
Located within the western ranges of the southern Rocky Mountains, Elk Lakes Provincial Park is an easily accessible wilderness park characterized by subalpine landscapes, remnant glaciers, peaks and lakes.

The area has many hiking options. Options for hikers of all abilities and interests are available, including family friendly backcountry hiking. Other trails are longer, more exposed and involve some route-finding.

Several mountaineering objectives and scrambles are available. Mounts Fox, Aosta, Petain, Nivelle and Castelnau can all be summited in a moderate to long day from the cabin. Mount Joffre is accessible from the Elk Lakes side, although a high camp is recommended for climbers.

The cabin supports backcountry skiing in winter. It is one of the few Canadian Alpine huts that can be reached on cross country skis by advanced skiers. Ski touring ranges from flat tours to advanced ski mountaineering.

The area has several waterfall ice routes and a established mixed climb.

== Nearby ==
- Elk Lakes
- Elk River
- Mount Aosta
- Mount Castelnau
- Mount Fox
- Mount Joffre
- Mount Nivelle
- Mount Pétain
- Petain Falls

== Parks Information ==
Elk Lakes Provincial Park is a BC park. Access from the Alberta side is through Peter Lougheed Provincial Park. Parks have rules about dogs, fishing, bicycles and other things. Dogs are not allowed on ski trails, nor inside the cabin. Bikes are allowed on the trail to Elk Pass (in Peter Lougheed Park) and along the power line to the cabin, but not elsewhere in Elk Lakes Park.

Campgrounds are available in both parks, including one a kilometer from the cabin.
