= Defender Mountain =

Mountain in Canada

- Mount Defender
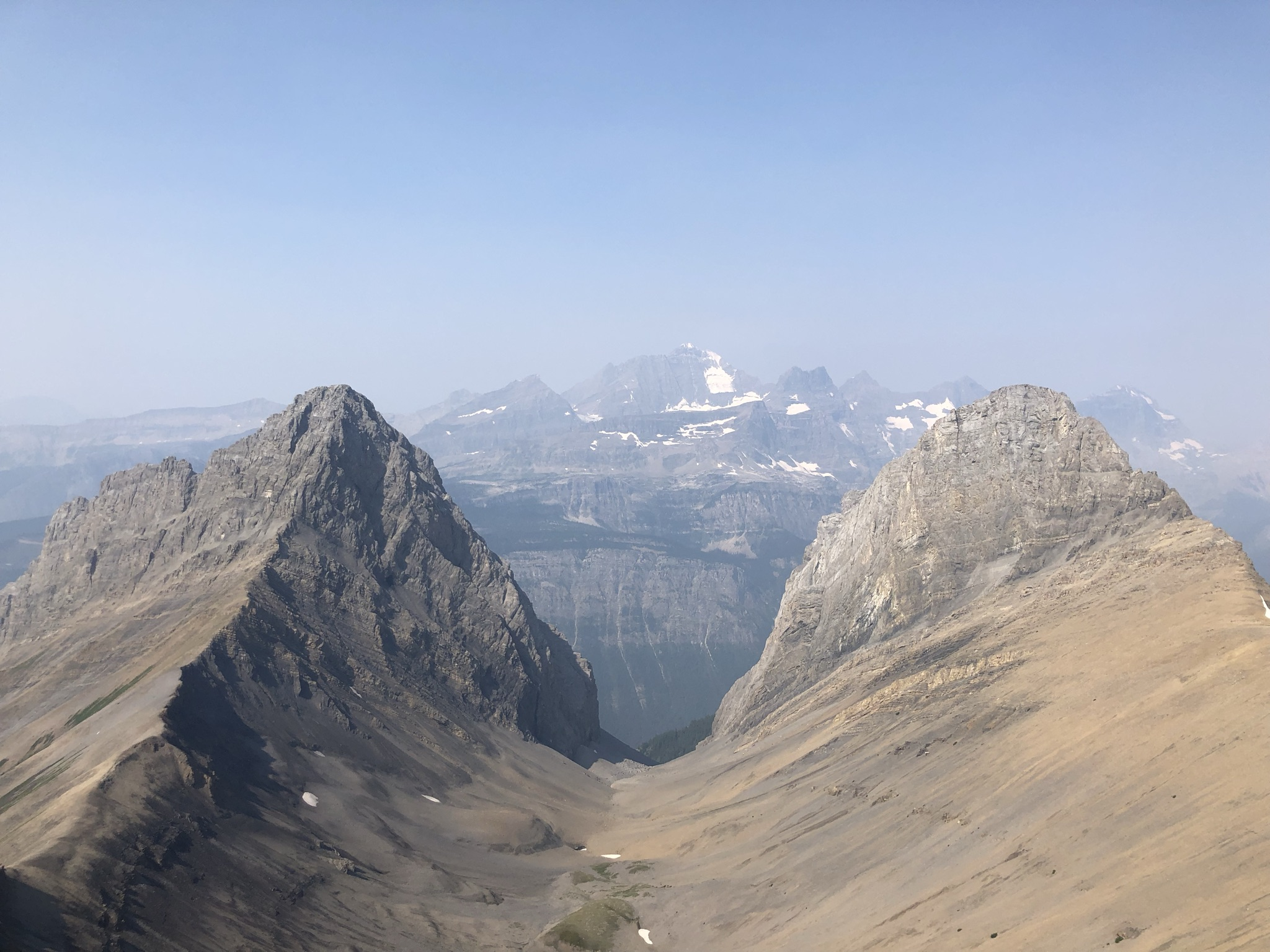
- Defender Mountain (right) and Onslow Mountain (left) frame Mount King George

Highest point
- Elevation: 2,821 m (9,255 ft); NAD83
- Prominence: 211 m (692 ft)
- Coordinates: 50°36′05″N 115°17′27″W

Naming
- Etymology: HMS Defender (1911)

Geography
- Location within Alberta Location within British Columbia Location within Canada
- Country: Canada
- Provinces: Alberta and British Columbia
- Parent range: Canadian Rockies
- Topo map: NTS 82J11 Kananaskis Lakes

Defender Mountain is located on the border of Alberta and British Columbia on the Continental Divide.

== History ==
Defender Mountain was named in 1916 by the Interprovincial Boundary Survey after the British Royal Navy ship HMS Defender (1911) that took part in the Battle of Jutland in World War I. The mountain's name was officially adopted as Mount Defender in 1924 by the Geographical Names Board of Canada and officially changed to Defender Mountain in 1966.

== See also ==
- List of peaks on the Alberta–British Columbia border
- Mountains of Alberta
- Mountains of British Columbia
