= Mount McHarg =

Mountain in Alberta and British Columbia, Canada

- Location within Alberta Location within British Columbia Location within Canada

Highest point
- Elevation: 2,888 m (9,475 ft)
- Prominence: 30 m (98 ft)
- Parent peak: Mount Worthington (2915 m)
- Listing: Mountains of Alberta; Mountains of British Columbia
- Coordinates: 50°37′32″N 115°18′18″W

Geography
- Country: Canada
- Provinces: Alberta and British Columbia
- District: Kootenay Land District
- Parent range: Spray Mountains
- Topo map: NTS 82J11 Kananaskis Lakes

Mount McHarg is located in Height of the Rockies Provincial Park and straddles the Continental Divide marking the Alberta-British Columbia border. It was named in 1918 after Lieutenant Colonel William Frederick Richard Hart-McHarg, British Columbia Regiment (Duke of Connaught's Own Rifles). McHarg was a British Columbia lawyer who practised in Rossland, British Columbia before serving in the Boer War where he suffered near-fatal injuries. McHarg died in April 1915 while on a reconnaissance mission in World War I. Vancouver's Georgia Viaduct was originally named McHarg Viaduct.

== See also ==
- List of peaks on the Alberta–British Columbia border
