= Mount Foch =

Mountain on Alberta/British Columbia boundary in Canada

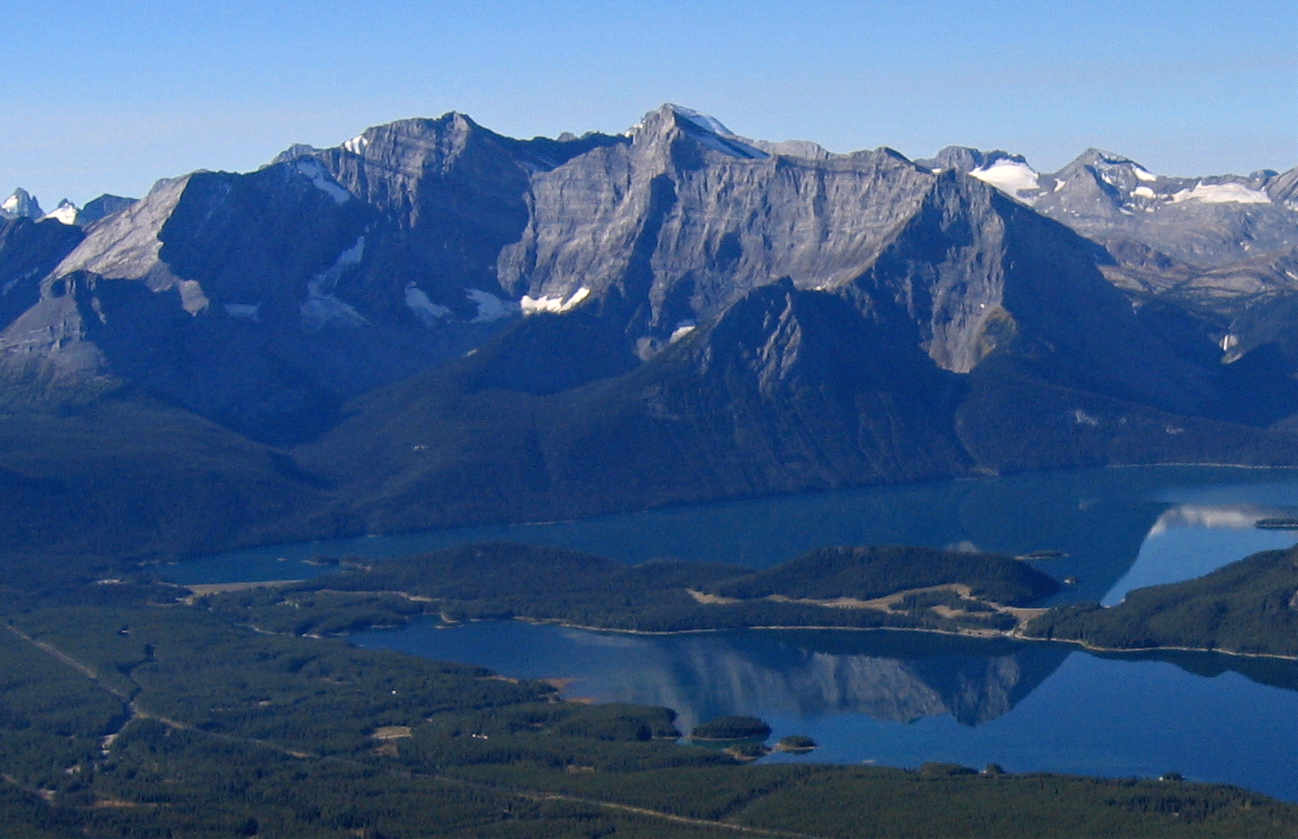
- Mounts Foch and Sarrail

Highest point
- Elevation: 3,194 m (10,479 ft)
- Prominence: 384 m (1,260 ft)
- Parent peak: Mount Pétain (3196 m)
- Listing: Mountains of Alberta; Mountains of British Columbia
- Coordinates: 50°34′22″N 115°09′22″W

Geography
- Location within Alberta Location within British Columbia Location within Canada
- Interactive map of Mount Foch
- Country: Canada
- Provinces: Alberta and British Columbia
- Parent range: Park Ranges
- Topo map: NTS 82J11 Kananaskis Lakes

Climbing
- First ascent: 1930 Katie Gardiner, Walter Fuez

Mount Foch is a 3,194-metre (10,479-foot) mountain summit located at the Northern end of Elk Lakes Provincial Park, and straddles the Continental Divide marking the Alberta-British Columbia border in Canada. It was named in 1918 after Marshal of France Ferdinand Foch.

The first ascent of the mountain was made in 1930 by Kate (Katie) Gardiner and Walter Feuz. The duo also made the first ascents of nearby Mount Sarrail and Mount Lyautey that same year.

== Geology ==
Mount Foch is composed of sedimentary rock laid down during the Precambrian to Jurassic periods. Formed in shallow seas, this sedimentary rock was pushed east and over the top of younger rock during the Laramide orogeny.

== Climate ==
Based on the Köppen climate classification, Mount Foch is located in a subarctic climate with cold, snowy winters, and mild summers. Temperatures can drop below −20 C with wind chill factors below −30 C. In terms of favorable weather, June through September are the best months to climb Mount Foch.

== Gallery ==
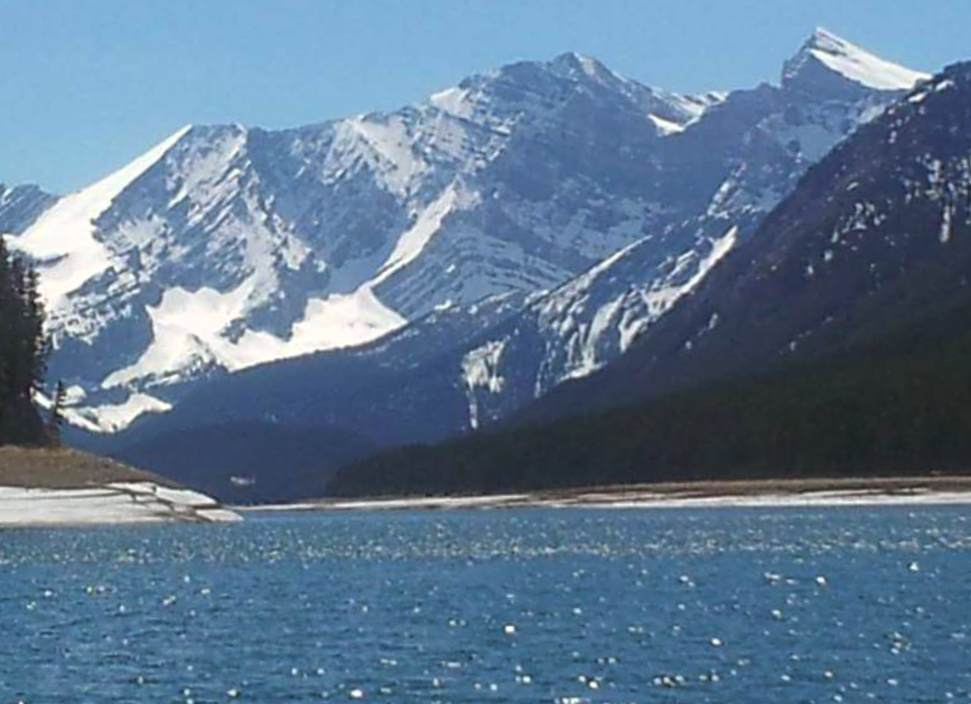
Lower Kananaskis Lake with Mount Foch and Sarrail

== See also ==
- List of peaks on the Alberta–British Columbia border
- List of mountains in the Canadian Rockies
