= Ozade Îmne =

Ozade Îmne is the Stoney language name for the Kananaskis Lakes:

- Lower Kananaskis Lake
- Upper Kananaskis Lake
