= Mount Prince Henry =

Mountain in British Columbia, Canada

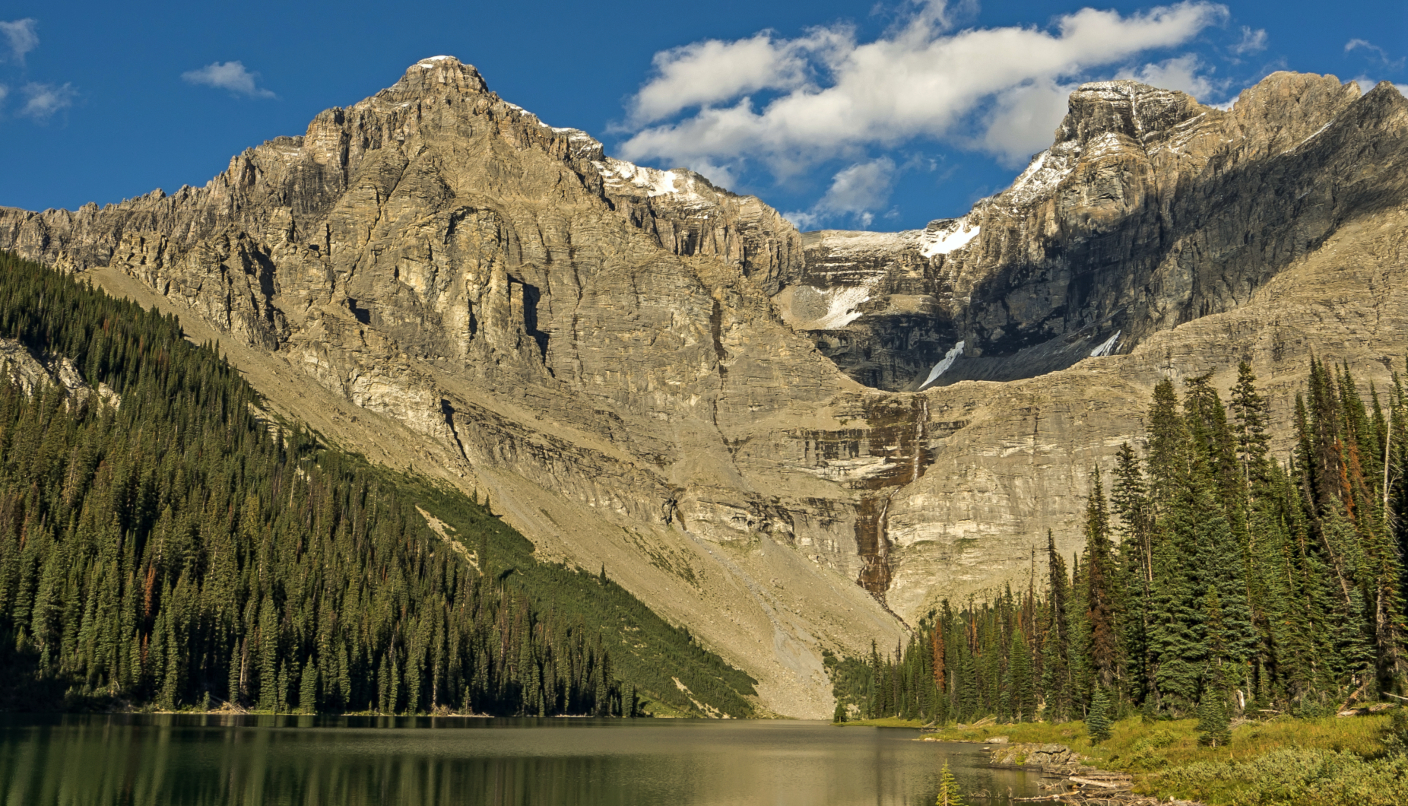
- West aspect of Mount Prince Henry. (Mt. Prince Edward in upper right)

Highest point
- Elevation: 3,219 m (10,561 ft)
- Prominence: 212 m (696 ft)
- Parent peak: Mount Prince Edward (3225 m)
- Listing: Mountains of British Columbia
- Coordinates: 50°37′16″N 115°25′15″W

Geography
- Location within British Columbia Location within Canada
- Country: Canada
- Province: British Columbia
- District: Kootenay Land District
- Protected area: Height of the Rockies Prov. Park
- Parent range: The Royal Group ← Park Ranges; Canadian Rockies
- Topo map: NTS 82J11 Kananaskis Lakes

Geology
- Rock age: Cambrian
- Rock type: Sedimentary rock

Climbing
- First ascent: 1929 by Katie Gardiner, Walter Feuz
- Easiest route: Mountaineering

Mount Prince Henry is a remote 3,219-metre (10,561-foot) mountain summit located in Height of the Rockies Provincial Park, in the Canadian Rockies of British Columbia, Canada. The mountain is part of The Royal Group, a subset of the Rockies, which includes Mount King George, Mount Queen Mary, Mount Princess Mary, Mount Prince George, Mount Prince Albert, Mount Prince John, and Mount Prince Edward. Its nearest higher peak is Mount Prince Edward, 1.0 km (0.62 mi) to the south-southeast. Mt. Prince Henry is composed of sedimentary rock laid down during the Cambrian period. Formed in shallow seas, this sedimentary rock was pushed east and over the top of younger rock during the Laramide orogeny.

== History ==
The mountain was named in 1913 by the Interprovincial Boundary Survey for Prince Henry, Duke of Gloucester (1900-1974), the third son of King George V. The name was officially adopted in the 16th Report of the Geographic Board of Canada in 1919.

The first ascent of Mount Prince Henry was made in 1929 by Kate (Katie) Gardiner with Walter Feuz as guide.

== Climate ==
Based on the Köppen climate classification, Mount Prince Henry is located in a subarctic climate zone with cold, snowy winters, and mild summers. Temperatures can drop below −20 °C (–4 °F) with wind chill factors below −30 °C (–22 °F). In terms of favorable weather, the best months for climbing are July through September.

== See also ==
- Geography of British Columbia
- Geology of British Columbia
