= Elk Lakes (British Columbia) =

Alpine lakes in British Columbia, Canada

- Upper & Lower Elk Lake
- Location within British Columbia Location within Canada
- Location: Elk Lakes Provincial Park, British Columbia, Canada
- Coordinates: 50°33′N 115°06′W
- Primary inflows: Petain Creek, Nivelle Creek
- Primary outflows: Elk River

Upper Elk Lake and Lower Elk Lake, collectively known as the Elk Lakes, are a pair of alpine lakes in southeastern British Columbia, Canada. They sit in the valley formed between Mt Aosta to the south and Mount Fox to the north. The Elk Lakes sit approximately two miles from the border between the Provinces of British Columbia and Alberta

Upper Elk Lake is the headwaters of the Elk River. The lakes and their immediate surroundings accordingly mark the northernmost portion of the Elk Valley and are protected as Elk Lakes Provincial Park.

The Elk Lakes cabin, maintained by the Alpine Club of Canada, is located a short distance east of Lower Elk Lake. There are also several nearby hiking trails and a tent-camping site near and around the lakes that can be accessed via a logging road.

== See also ==
- List of lakes of British Columbia
