= Mount Sarrail =

Mountain in the country of Canada

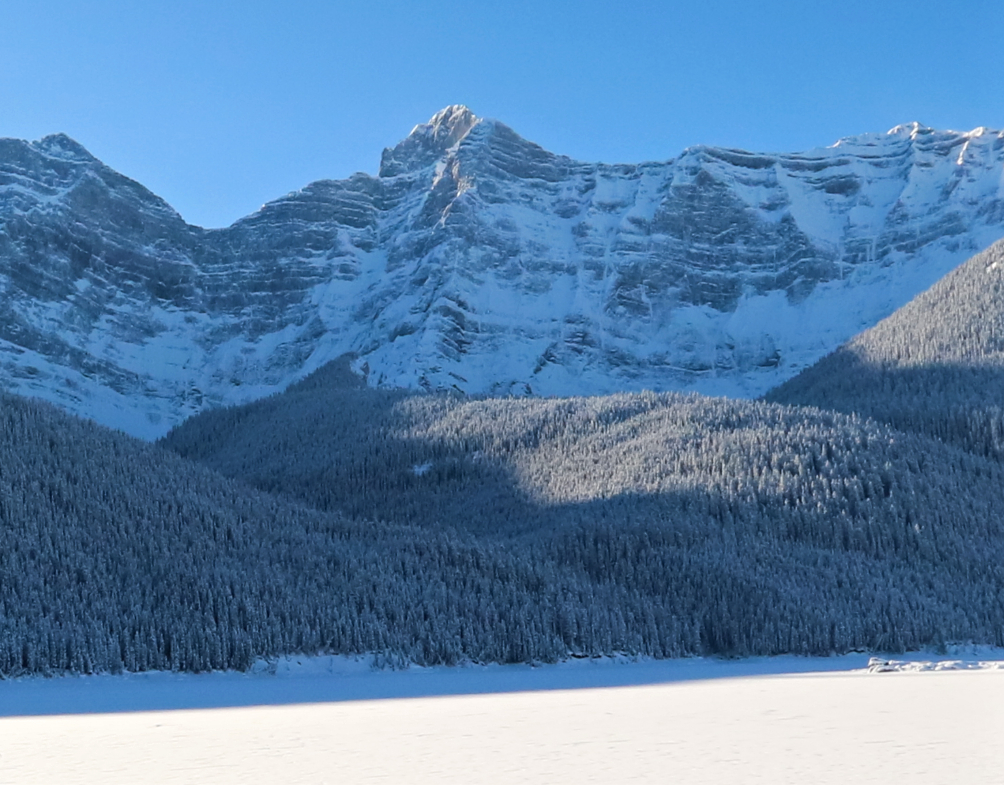
- Mount Sarrail seen from the north

Highest point
- Elevation: 3,170 m (10,400 ft)
- Prominence: 269 m (883 ft)
- Parent peak: Mount Foch (3194 m)
- Listing: Mountains of Alberta
- Coordinates: 50°34′49″N 115°10′00″W

Geography
- Location within Alberta Location within Canada
- Interactive map of Mount Sarrail
- Country: Canada
- Province: Alberta
- Parent range: Park Ranges; Canadian Rockies
- Topo map: NTS 82J11 Kananaskis Lakes

Geology
- Rock age: Cambrian
- Rock type: Limestone

Climbing
- First ascent: 1930 Katie Gardiner, Walter Feuz
- Easiest route: Easy/Moderate Scramble

Mount Sarrail is a 3,159-metre (10,364-foot) mountain summit located in Kananaskis Country in the Canadian Rockies of Alberta, Canada. Mount Sarrail is situated 1.0 kilometre north of the Continental Divide, within Peter Lougheed Provincial Park. Its nearest higher peak is Mount Foch, 1.0 km (0.62 mi) to the southeast. Mount Sarrail can be seen from Upper Kananaskis Lake and Alberta Highway 40.

== History ==
The mountain was named in 1918 for General Maurice Sarrail (1856–1929), the commander of the French Third Army in World War I.

The mountain's name was officially adopted in 1924 by the Geographical Names Board of Canada.

The first ascent of the mountain was made in 1930 by Kate (Katie) Gardiner and Walter Feuz. The duo also made the first ascents of nearby Mount Foch and Mount Lyautey that same year.

== Geology ==
Mount Sarrail is composed of sedimentary rock laid down during the Precambrian to Jurassic periods. Formed in shallow seas, this sedimentary rock was pushed east and over the top of younger rock during the Laramide orogeny.

== Climate ==
Based on the Köppen climate classification, Mount Sarrail is located in a subarctic climate with cold, snowy winters, and mild summers. Temperatures can drop below −20 °C with wind chill factors below −30 °C. In terms of favorable weather, June through September are the best months to climb Mount Sarrail. Precipitation runoff from the mountain drains into tributaries of the Kananaskis River.

== Gallery ==
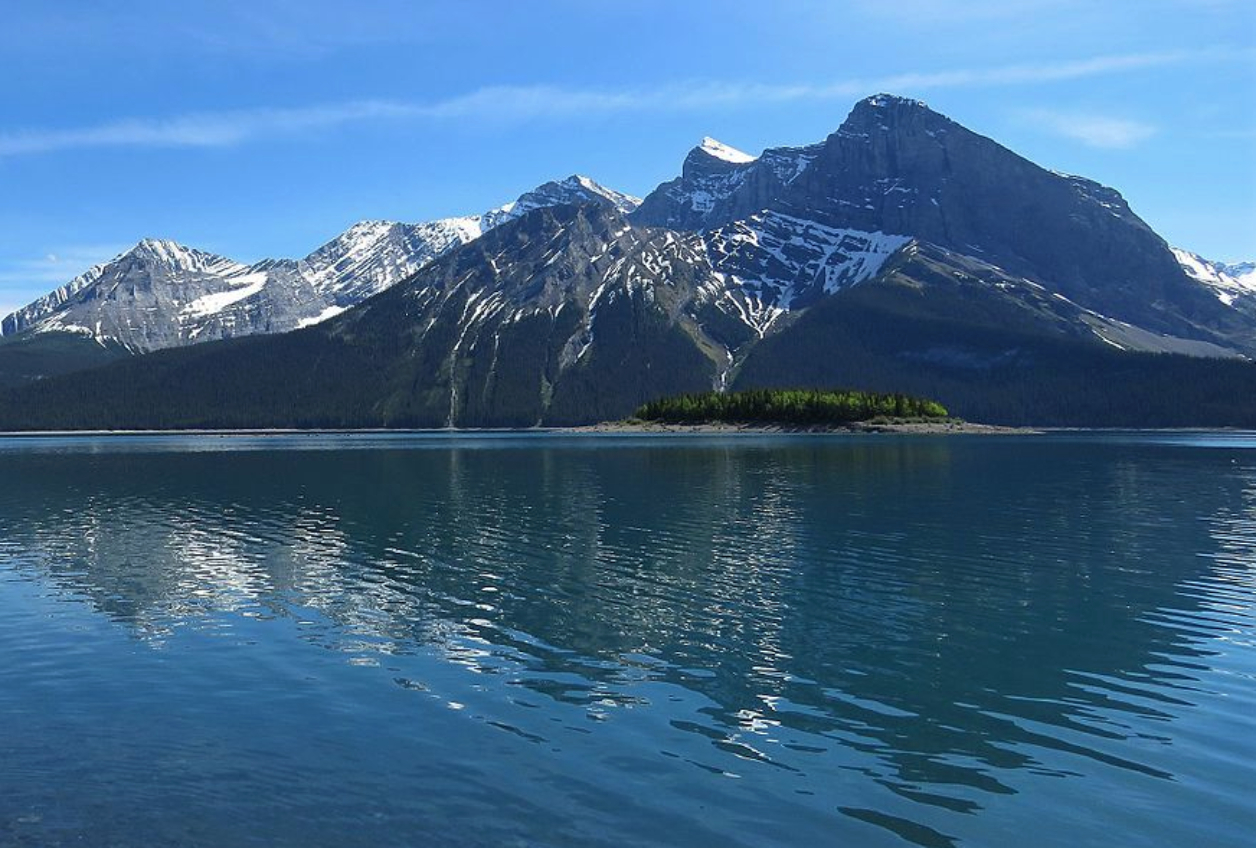
Upper Kananaski Lake with Mount Sarrail to right

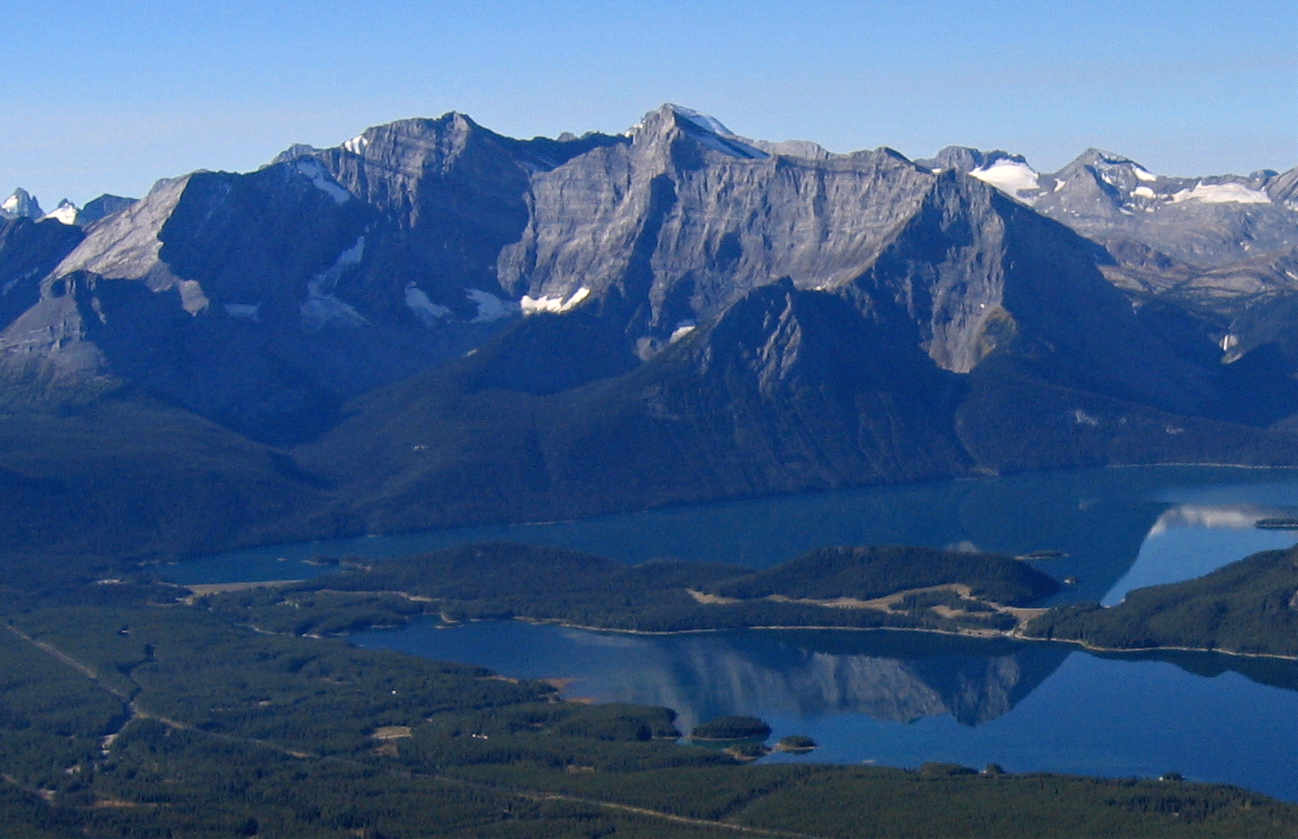
Aerial view of Foch and Sarrail with the Kananaskis Lakes

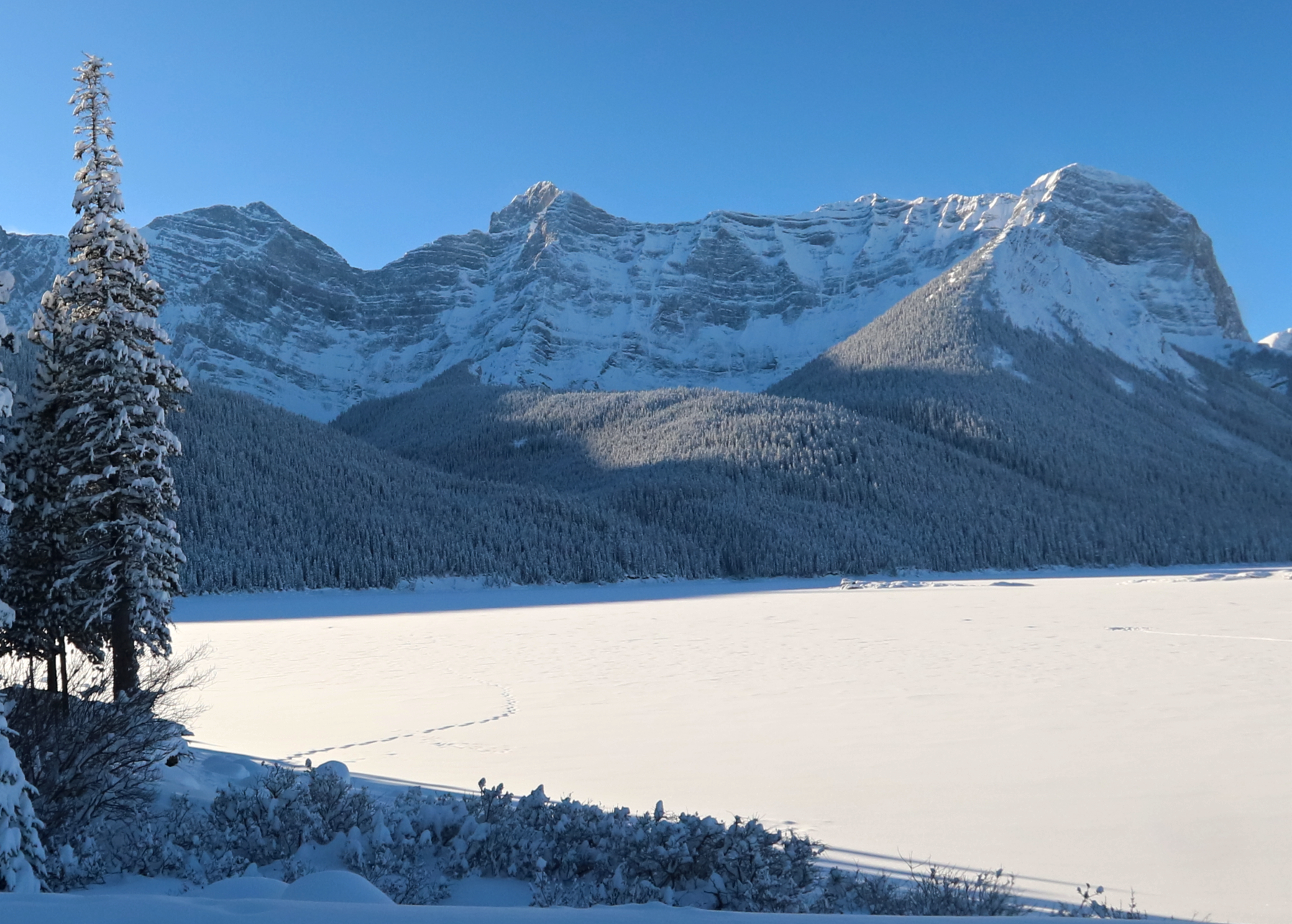
Mount Sarrail in winter

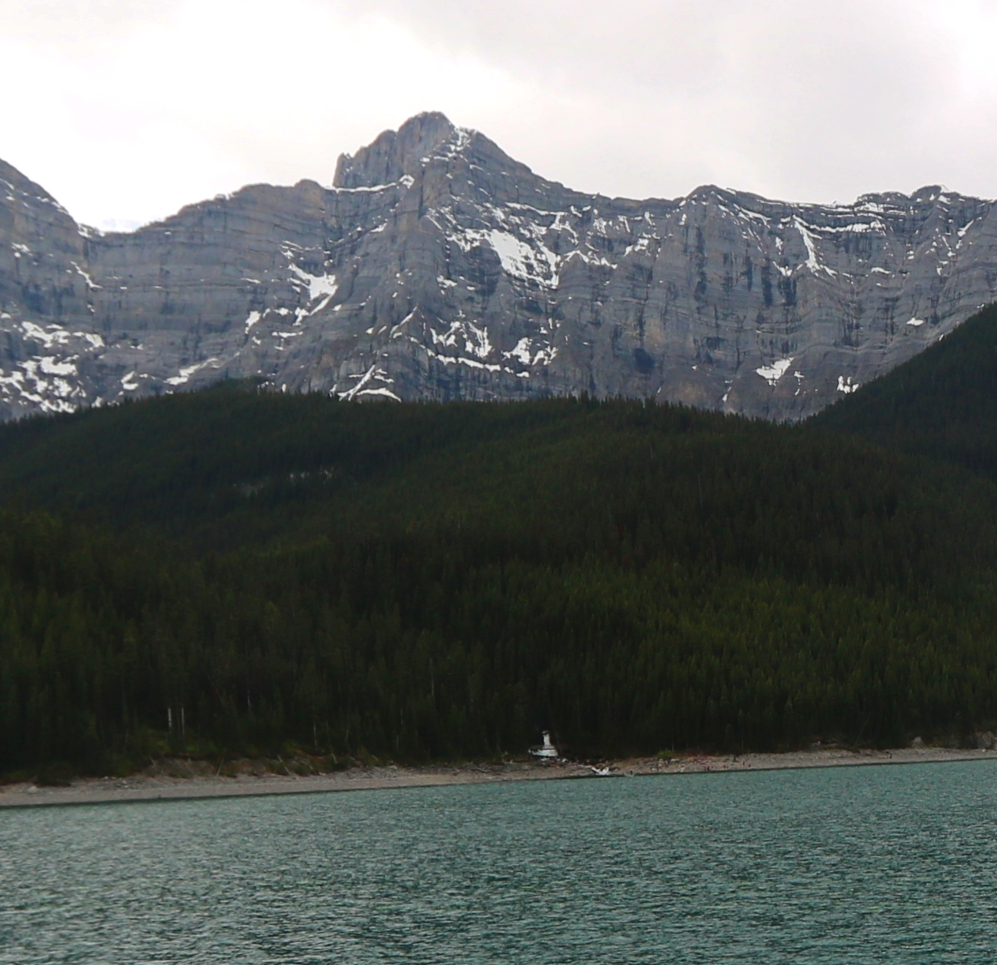
Mount Sarrail

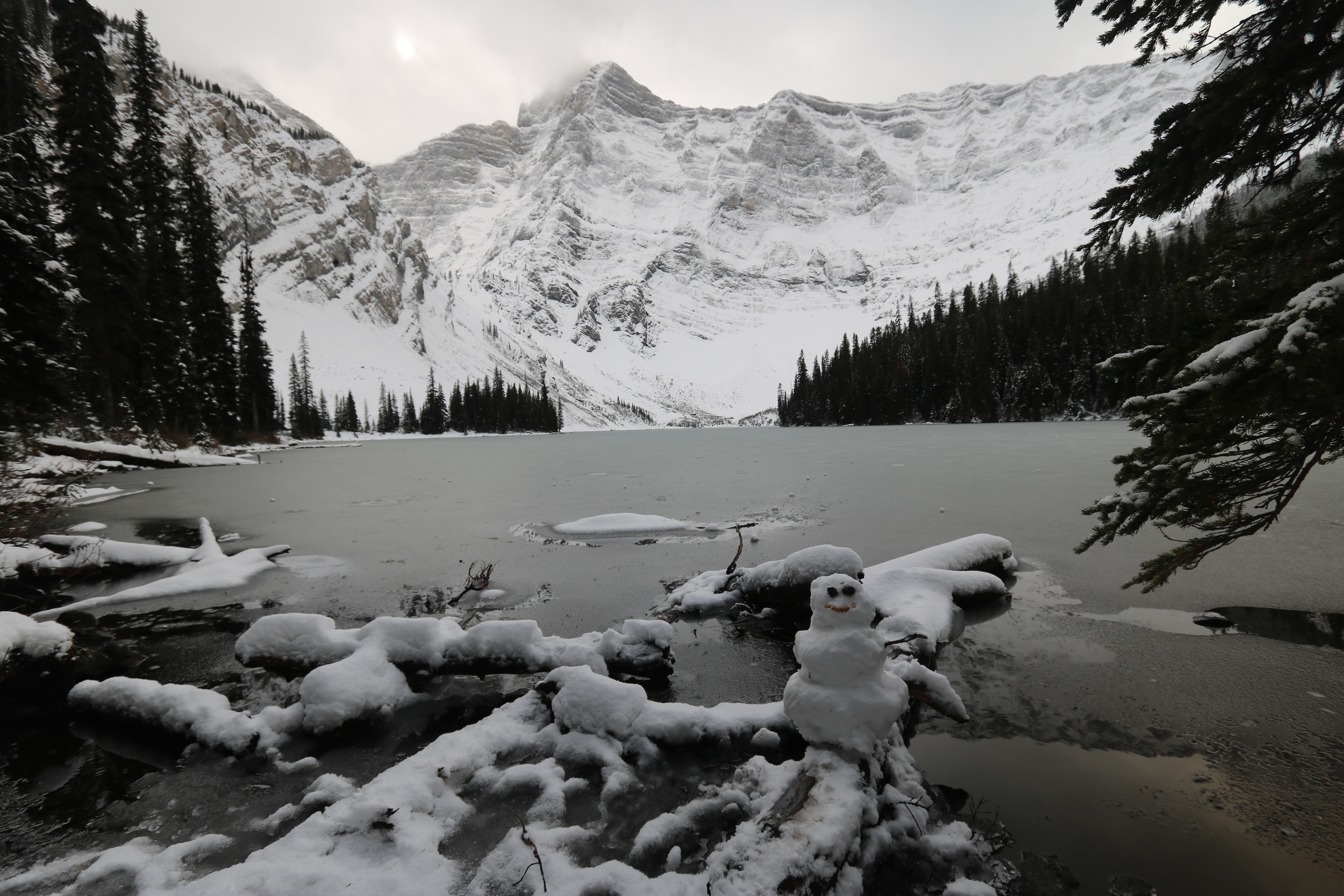
Mount Sarrail seen from Rawson Lake

== See also ==
- Geography of Alberta
