= Kate Gardiner =

New Zealand mountaineer

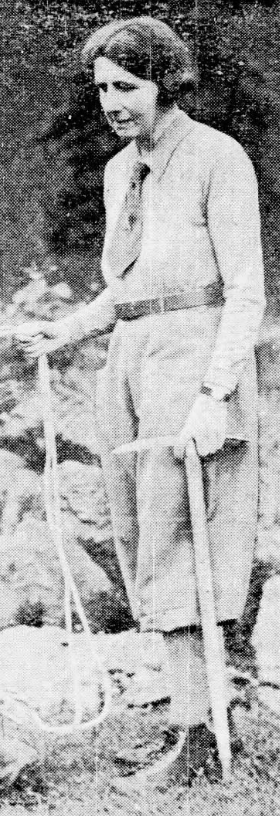
- Born: Katherine Maude Gardiner; 21 September 1885; Wavertree, Liverpool, Lancashire, U.K.
- Died: 29 January 1974 (aged 88)
- Occupation(s): Mountaineer, photographer
- Father: Frederick Gardiner

Kate (Katherine Maude) Gardiner (21 September 1885–29 January 1974) was an English mountaineer who climbed extensively in New Zealand.

== Biography ==
Katherine Maude Gardiner was born in Wavertree, Liverpool, Lancashire, England on 21 September 1885. She was the daughter of the ship-owner, Frederick Gardiner who made the first ascent of Mount Elbrus and she climbed the Breithorn with her father when she was only 10 years old.

Her father had died in 1919 leaving an estate of £56,128 (about £3.5 million in 2022) but her mother had a long-term health condition and until her death in 1926 Gardiner was her caregiver. In 1926, soon after her mother's death, and having been inspired by pictures of Mount Cook, Gardiner made her first visit to New Zealand. Over the following 10 years she regularly spent the New Zealand summers climbing in the Southern Alps and the rest of the year climbing in Canada and Switzerland. This cycle was broken by the Second World War, during which she was the commandant of a British Red Cross Detachment in north-west England. In 1950 she returned to New Zealand and settled there for the rest of her life.

== Mountaineering ==
In 1930 she made first ascents with her guide Walter Feuz in the Canadian Rockies of Mount Lyautey, Mount Sarrail, Mount Foch, Mount Bogart, Warrior Mountain, and Mount Galatea. Other notable first ascents include Mount Prince Henry (1919), Mount Alcantara (1929), Foster Peak (1933), and White Pyramid (1939). She would eventually complete 33 first ascents in the Canadian Rockies.

In February 1933 she set out to climb Mt Tasman with Alfred Maurice Binnie and the guides Vic Williams and Jack Pope. A storm broke out as they overnighted on the Fox Glacier and threatened their tents so Pope cut out a platform in a nearby crevasse to give them some shelter. They hoped that the storm would have passed by the morning but blizzard conditions lasted for eight days and they only had limited supplies. On the sixth day Gardiner wrote out a will, making provision for her guides' wives in case the party did not survive. Then on the ninth day a lull in the storm allowed them to leave the crevasse and head down the glacier. On the way they met a search/rescue party led by the mountain guide, Joe Fluerty, his party had been storm bound in the Chancellor Hut lower on the mountain. The intensity of the storm rose again just a few hours after Gardiner and the rescue party reached the Chancellor Hut.

Gardiner joined the Ladies' Alpine Club in 1929 and was later elected President (1941–1943).
