= Mount Fox (Canadian Rockies) =

Mountain in Western Canada

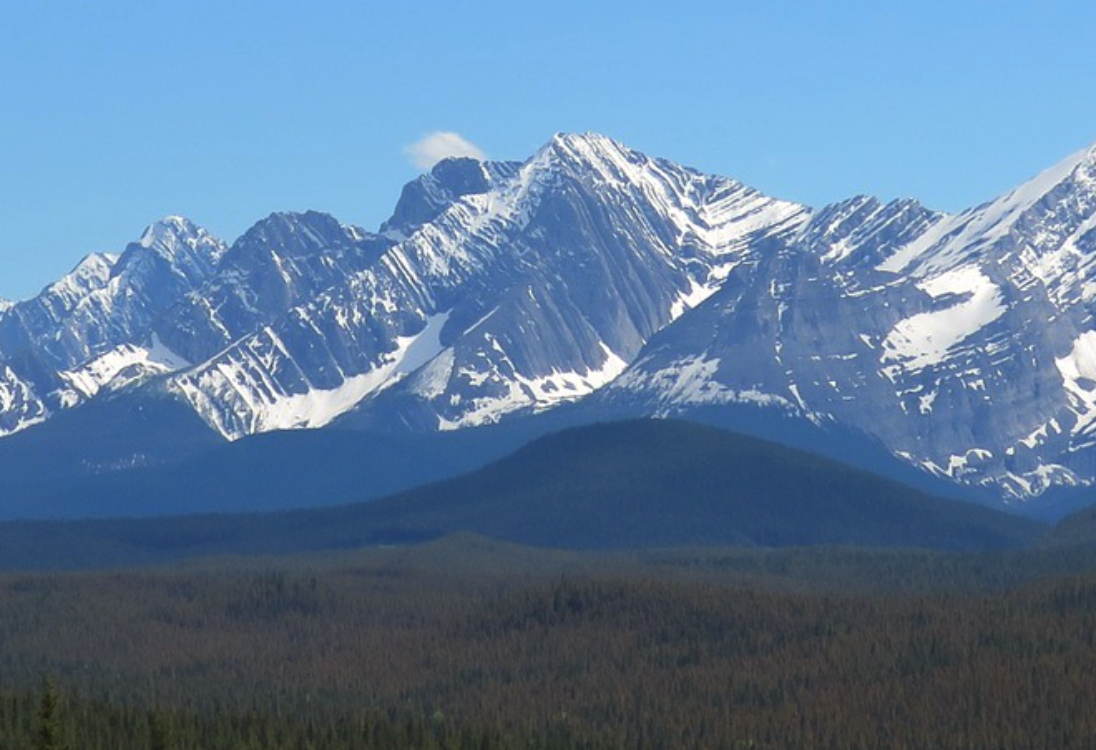
- Mount Fox (centered) from the north

Highest point
- Elevation: 2,973 m (9,754 ft)
- Prominence: 228 m (748 ft)
- Parent peak: Mount Foch (3194 m)
- Listing: Mountains of Alberta; Mountains of British Columbia
- Coordinates: 50°34′14″N 115°07′09″W

Geography
- Location within Alberta Location within British Columbia Location within Canada
- Country: Canada
- Provinces: Alberta and British Columbia
- Protected area: Elk Lakes Provincial Park
- Parent range: Park Ranges
- Topo map: NTS 82J11 Kananaskis Lakes

Climbing
- First ascent: 1916 Interprovincial Boundary Commission
- Easiest route: Difficult and exposed Scramble

Mount Fox is a 2,973-metre (9,754-foot) mountain on the shared border between Alberta and British Columbia, Canada. It is situated on the Continental Divide south of the Kananaskis Lakes area of the Canadian Rockies. It was named in 1859 by John Palliser after Sir Charles Fox (1810-1874), a member of the Royal Geographical Society.

== Geology ==
Mount Fox is composed of sedimentary rock laid down during the Precambrian to Jurassic periods. Formed in shallow seas, this sedimentary rock was pushed east and over the top of younger rock during the Laramide orogeny.

== Climate ==
Based on the Köppen climate classification, Mount Fox is located in a subarctic climate with cold, snowy winters, and mild summers. Temperatures can drop below −20 °C with wind chill factors below −30 °C. In terms of favorable weather, June through September are the best months to climb it.

== See also ==
- List of peaks on the Alberta–British Columbia border
