= Elk Lake Township, Grant County, Minnesota =

Township in Minnesota, United States

Elk Lake Township
- Township
- Location within the state of Minnesota Elk Lake Township (the United States)
- Coordinates: 45°54′24″N 95°49′53″W
- Country: United States
- State: Minnesota
- County: Grant

Area
  - Total: 35.5 sq mi (91.9 km^{2})
  - Land: 32.2 sq mi (83.3 km^{2})
  - Water: 3.3 sq mi (8.6 km^{2})
- Elevation: 1,194 ft (364 m)

Population (2000)
  - Total: 298
  - Density: 9.3/sq mi (3.6/km^{2})
- Time zone: UTC-6 (Central (CST))
  - Summer (DST): UTC-5 (CDT)
- FIPS code: 27-18620
- GNIS feature ID: 0664068

Elk Lake Township is a township in Grant County, Minnesota, United States. The population was 298 at the 2000 census.

== History ==
Elk Lake Township was organized in 1876, and named after the Elk Lake within its borders.

== Geography ==
According to the United States Census Bureau, the township has a total area of 35.5 square miles (92 km^{2}), of which 32.2 square miles (83 km^{2}) is land and 3.3 square miles (8.5 km^{2}) (9.33%) is water.

== Demographics ==
As of the census of 2000, there were 298 people, 98 households, and 87 families residing in the township. The population density was 9.3 inhabitants per square mile (3.6/km^{2}). There were 124 housing units at an average density of 3.9 per square mile (1.5/km^{2}). The racial makeup of the township was 96.98% White, 2.68% African American, 0.34% from other races. Hispanic or Latino of any race were 1.68% of the population.

There were 98 households, out of which 37.8% had children under the age of 18 living with them, 78.6% were married couples living together, 7.1% had a female householder with no husband present, and 11.2% were non-families. 10.2% of all households were made up of individuals, and 4.1% had someone living alone who was 65 years of age or older. The average household size was 2.91 and the average family size was 3.06.

In the township the population was spread out, with 25.2% under the age of 18, 8.1% from 18 to 24, 22.1% from 25 to 44, 28.5% from 45 to 64, and 16.1% who were 65 years of age or older. The median age was 42 years. For every 100 females, there were 108.4 males. For every 100 females age 18 and over, there were 104.6 males.

The median income for a household in the township was $47,125, and the median income for a family was $47,750. Males had a median income of $32,083 versus $17,727 for females. The per capita income for the township was $16,365. About 4.8% of families and 6.8% of the population were below the poverty line, including 8.6% of those under the age of eighteen and 19.1% of those 65 or over.

== See also ==
- List of townships in Minnesota
