= Mount King George (British Columbia) =

Mountain in British Columbia, Canada

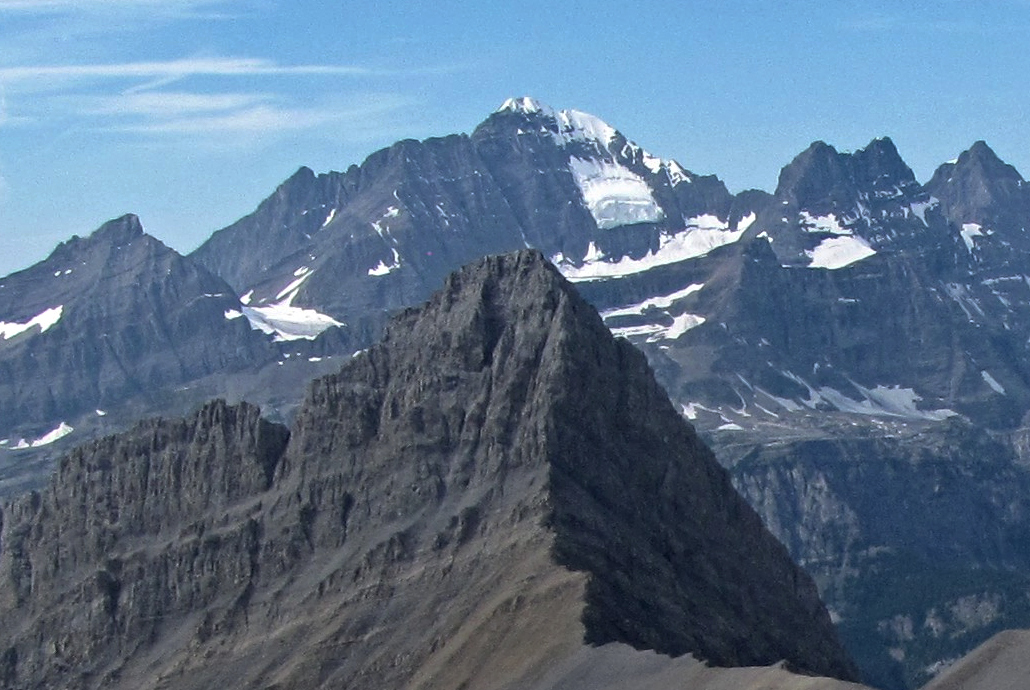
- Mount King George, highest peak in the distance

Highest point
- Elevation: 3,413 m (11,198 ft)
- Prominence: 1,329 m (4,360 ft)
- Parent peak: Mount Joffre (3433 m)
- Listing: Mountains of British Columbia; Canada highest major peaks 44th
- Coordinates: 50°35′47″N 115°24′18″W

Geography
- Location within British Columbia Location within Canada
- Interactive map of Mount King George
- Country: Canada
- Province: British Columbia
- District: Kootenay Land District
- Protected area: Height of the Rockies Provincial Park
- Parent range: The Royal Group ← Park Ranges
- Topo map: NTS 82J11 Kananaskis Lakes

Geology
- Rock age: Cambrian
- Rock type: sedimentary rock

Climbing
- First ascent: 1919 by Val Fynn, Rudolph Aemmer
- Easiest route: Mountaineering

Mount King George is a prominent 3,413-metre (11,198-foot) mountain summit located in Height of the Rockies Provincial Park, in the Canadian Rockies of British Columbia, Canada. The mountain is the highest point of The Royal Group, a subset of the Rockies, which includes Mount Queen Mary, Mount Princess Mary, Mount Prince George, Mount Prince Albert, Mount Prince Henry, Mount Prince John, and Mount Prince Edward. Its nearest higher peak is Mount Joffre, 16.0 km (9.9 mi) to the east. Mount King George is composed of sedimentary rock laid down during the Cambrian period. Formed in shallow seas, this sedimentary rock was pushed east and over the top of younger rock during the Laramide orogeny.

== History ==
The mountain was named in 1917 by the Interprovincial Boundary Survey after King George V (1865–1936). The name was officially adopted 23 February 1918.

The first ascent of Mount King George was made 10 August 1919 by Val Fynn with Rudolph Aemmer as guide. Owing in part to the remoteness of the peak and the difficulty of the first ascent, the second ascent of the mountain was not made until 1970 by Gerry Brown, William Hurst, and John Carter.

== Climbing ==
Established climbing routes on Mount King George:

- East Face-North Ridge class 5.3 (1919 route of the first ascent)
- Southeast Ridge class 5.3 (1970 route of the second ascent)
- Southwest Face-West Ridge (1971 route of the third ascent by D. Hurrell, R. Mills)
- Congdon-McNab Coulior (FA 1980 by Dwayne Congdon, Dave McNab)
- East Face (FA 1984 by F. Campbell, R. Varnam, K. Nagy)
- Elzinga-Welsted class 5.6 (FA 2012 by Jim Elzinga, Ian Welsted)

== Climate ==
Based on the Köppen climate classification, Mount King George is located in a subarctic climate zone with cold, snowy winters, and mild summers. This climate supports the King George Glacier on the eastern slope of the mountain. Temperatures can drop below −20 °C with wind chill factors below −30 °C. Precipitation runoff from the mountain drains into tributaries of the Palliser River. In terms of favorable weather, the best months for climbing are July through September, with late summer being best for crossing the Palliser River.

== See also ==
- Geography of British Columbia
- Geology of British Columbia
- Royal eponyms in Canada
