= Elk Lake (Douglas County, Minnesota) =

Lake in the state of Minnesota, United States

- Location within Minnesota
- Location: Douglas County, Minnesota
- Coordinates: 45°55′9″N 95°31′19″W
- Type: lake

Elk Lake is a lake in Douglas County, in the U.S. state of Minnesota.

Elk Lake was named for the elk which frequented it.

== See also ==
- List of lakes in Minnesota
