= Mount Lyautey =

Mountain in Alberta, Canada

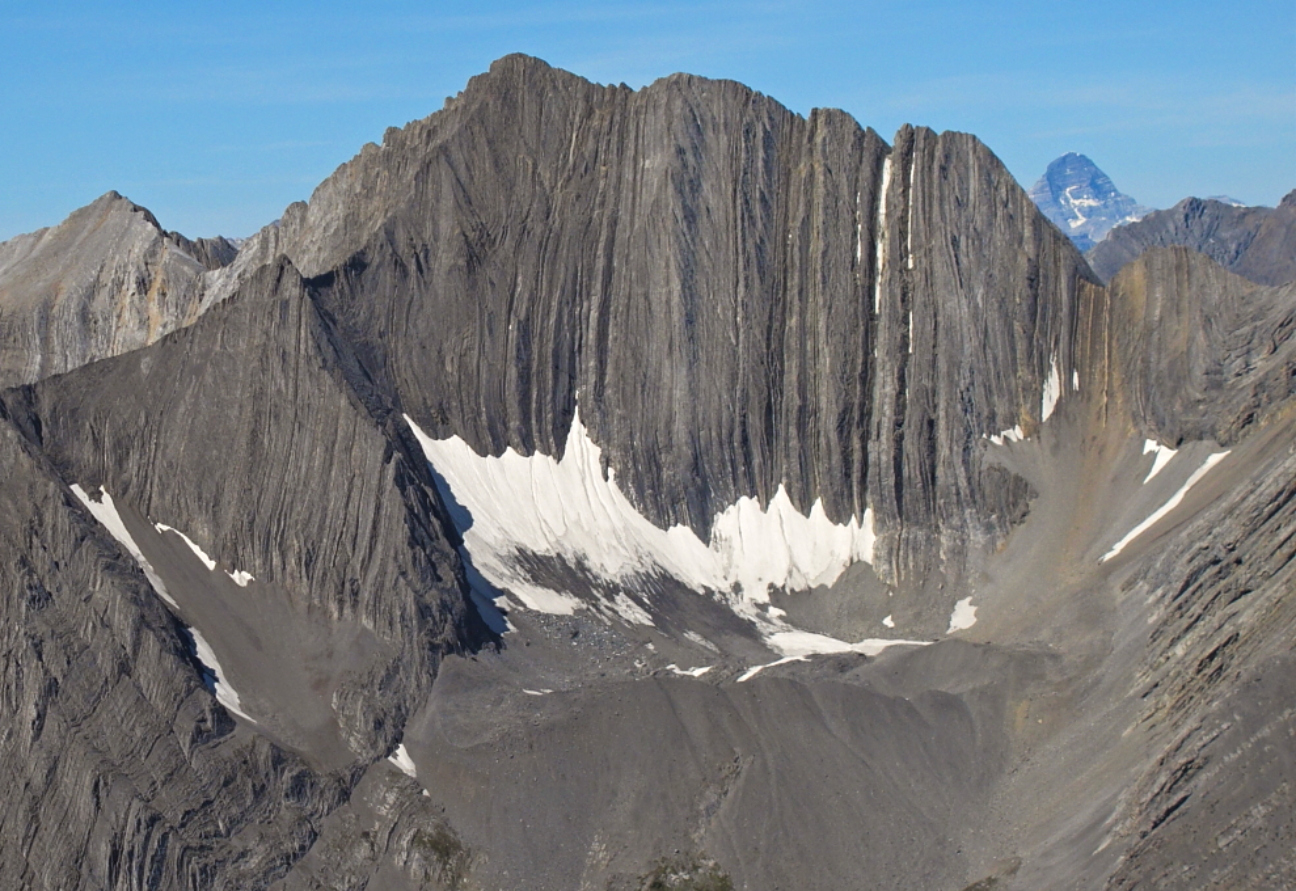
- Mount Lyautey

Highest point
- Elevation: 3,045 m (9,990 ft)
- Prominence: 454 m (1,490 ft)
- Parent peak: Mount Joffre (3,433 m)
- Listing: Mountains of Alberta
- Coordinates: 50°36′11″N 115°13′23″W

Geography
- Location within Alberta Location within Canada
- Interactive map of Mount Lyautey
- Country: Canada
- Province: Alberta
- Parent range: Canadian Rockies
- Topo map: NTS 82J11 Kananaskis Lakes

Geology
- Rock age: Cambrian
- Rock type: sedimentary rock

Climbing
- First ascent: 1930 Katie Gardiner, Walter Feuz
- Easiest route: Mountaineering

Mount Lyautey is a 3,045-metre (9,990-foot) mountain summit located in Kananaskis Country in the Canadian Rockies of Alberta, Canada. Mount Lyautey is situated 2.0 kilometres east of the Continental Divide, within Peter Lougheed Provincial Park. Its nearest higher peak is Mount Joffre, 8.0 km (5.0 mi) to the south. Mount Lyautey can be seen from Upper Kananaskis Lake and Alberta Highway 40.

== History ==
The mountain was named in 1918 for General Louis Hubert Gonzalve Lyautey (1854–1934), a French Army officer and Marshal of France in 1921. The mountain's name became official in 1924 by the Geographical Names Board of Canada. The first ascent of the mountain was made in 1930 by Kate (Katie) Gardiner and Walter Feuz. The duo also made the first ascents of nearby Mount Sarrail and Warrior Mountain that same year.

== Geology ==
Mount Lyautey is primarily composed of limestone, which is a sedimentary rock that was laid down during the Precambrian to Jurassic periods. Formed in shallow seas, this sedimentary rock was pushed east and over the top of younger rock during the Laramide orogeny. The Lyautey Glacier is situated on the northern slopes of the mountain.

== Climate ==
Based on the Köppen climate classification, Mount Lyautey is located in a subarctic climate zone with cold, snowy winters, and mild summers. Winter temperatures can drop below −20 °C with wind chill factors below −30 °C. In terms of favorable weather, June through September are the best months to climb Mount Lyautey. Precipitation runoff from the mountain drains into tributaries of the Kananaskis River.

== Gallery ==
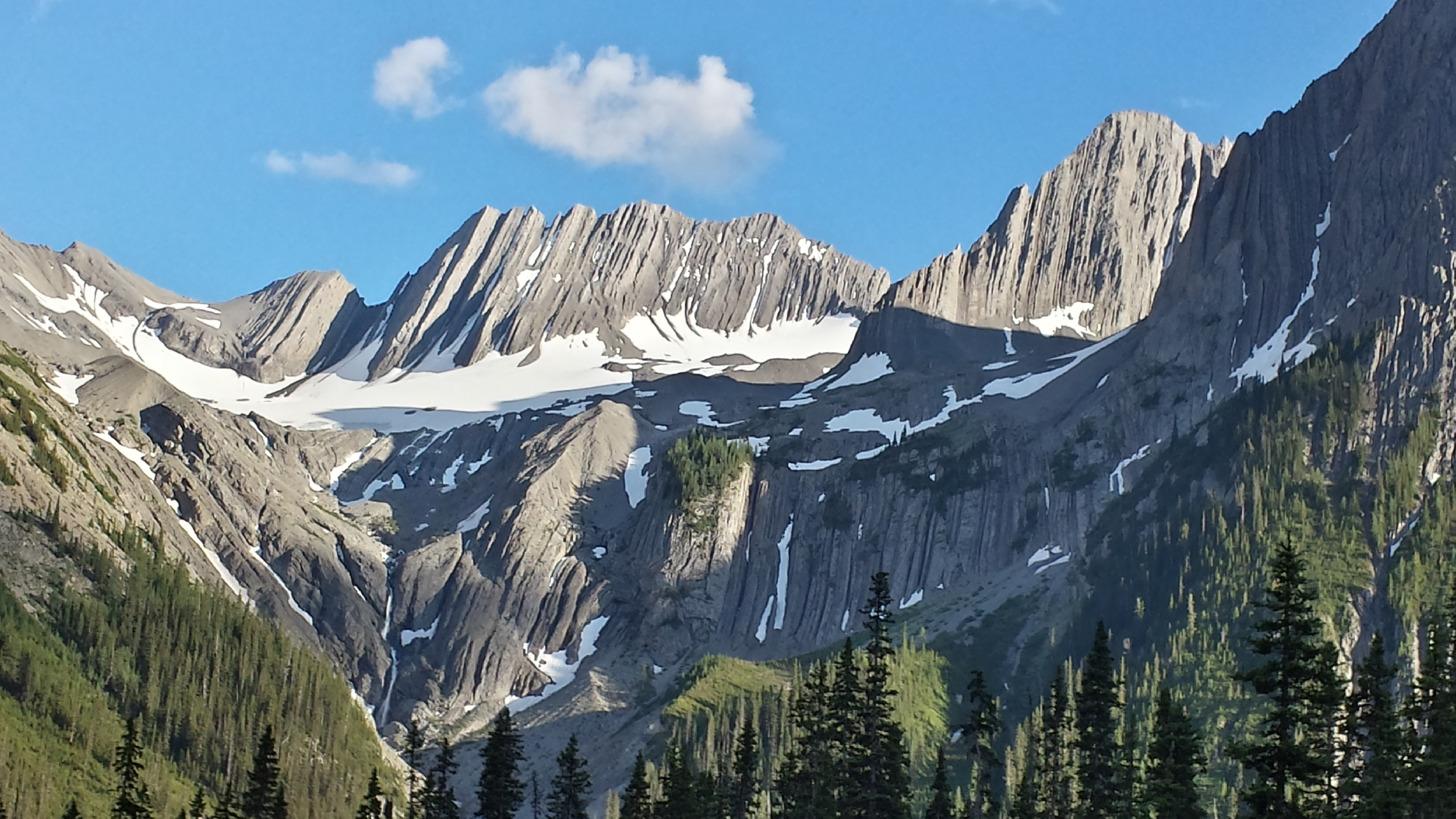
Mount Lyautey

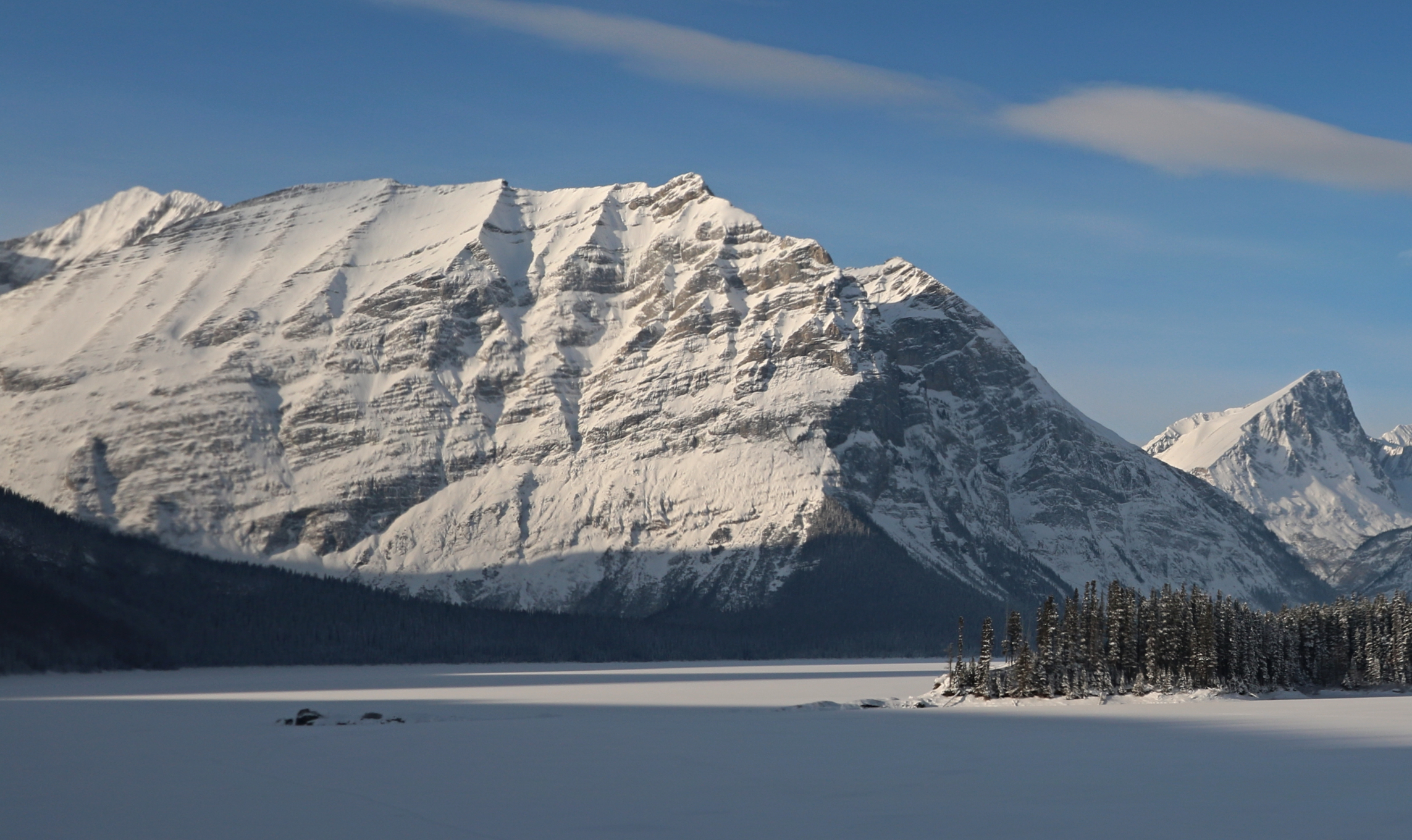
Mount Lyautey, summit in upper left

== See also ==
- Geology of Alberta
