= Elk Lake (Grant County, Minnesota) =

Lake in the state of Minnesota, United States

- Location within Minnesota
- Location: Grant County, Minnesota
- Coordinates: 45°52′2″N 95°48′17″W
- Type: lake

Elk Lake is a lake in Grant County, in the U.S. state of Minnesota.

Elk Lake was named for the elk seen there by pioneer settlers.

== See also ==
- List of lakes in Minnesota
