= White River (British Columbia) =

Location
- Country: Canada
- Province: British Columbia
- District: Kootenay Land District

Physical characteristics
- Source: Sylvan Pass
  - location: Height of the Rockies Provincial Park
  - coordinates: 50°31′05″N 115°13′40″W
  - elevation: 2,360 m (7,740 ft)
- Mouth: Kootenay River
  - location: 25 kilometres (16 mi) northeast of Canal Flats
  - coordinates: 50°21′10″N 115°37′32″W
  - elevation: 915 m (3,002 ft)
- Length: 65 km (40 mi)
- Basin size: 987 km^{2} (381 sq mi)
- Discharge
  - average: 17.5 m^{3}/s (620 cu ft/s)
  - maximum: 103 m^{3}/s (3,600 cu ft/s)

The White River is a major headwaters tributary of the Kootenay River in southeastern British Columbia, Canada. The river is 65 kilometres (40 mi) long and drains an isolated area of the Canadian Rockies east of the village of Canal Flats.

It rises at Sylvan Pass, in a precipitous glacial basin in Height of the Rockies Provincial Park. It flows southwards through a deep valley along the Park Ranges, then swings southwest to receive the North Fork from the right. The river then makes a broad northwestward curve around the south flank of Flett Peak, passing Whiteswan Lake Provincial Park. It then flows generally north-northwest, emptying into the Kootenay on the left bank.

The White is a large, steep, fast flowing glacial river and can be up to 60 metres (200 ft) wide as it nears the mouth. The river's drainage basin of some 987 square kilometres (381 mi^{2}) consists almost entirely of virgin forest. There are no bridges, diversions or dams.

== See also ==
- List of rivers of British Columbia
