= Upper Kananaskis Lake =

Reservoir in Kananaskis, Alberta

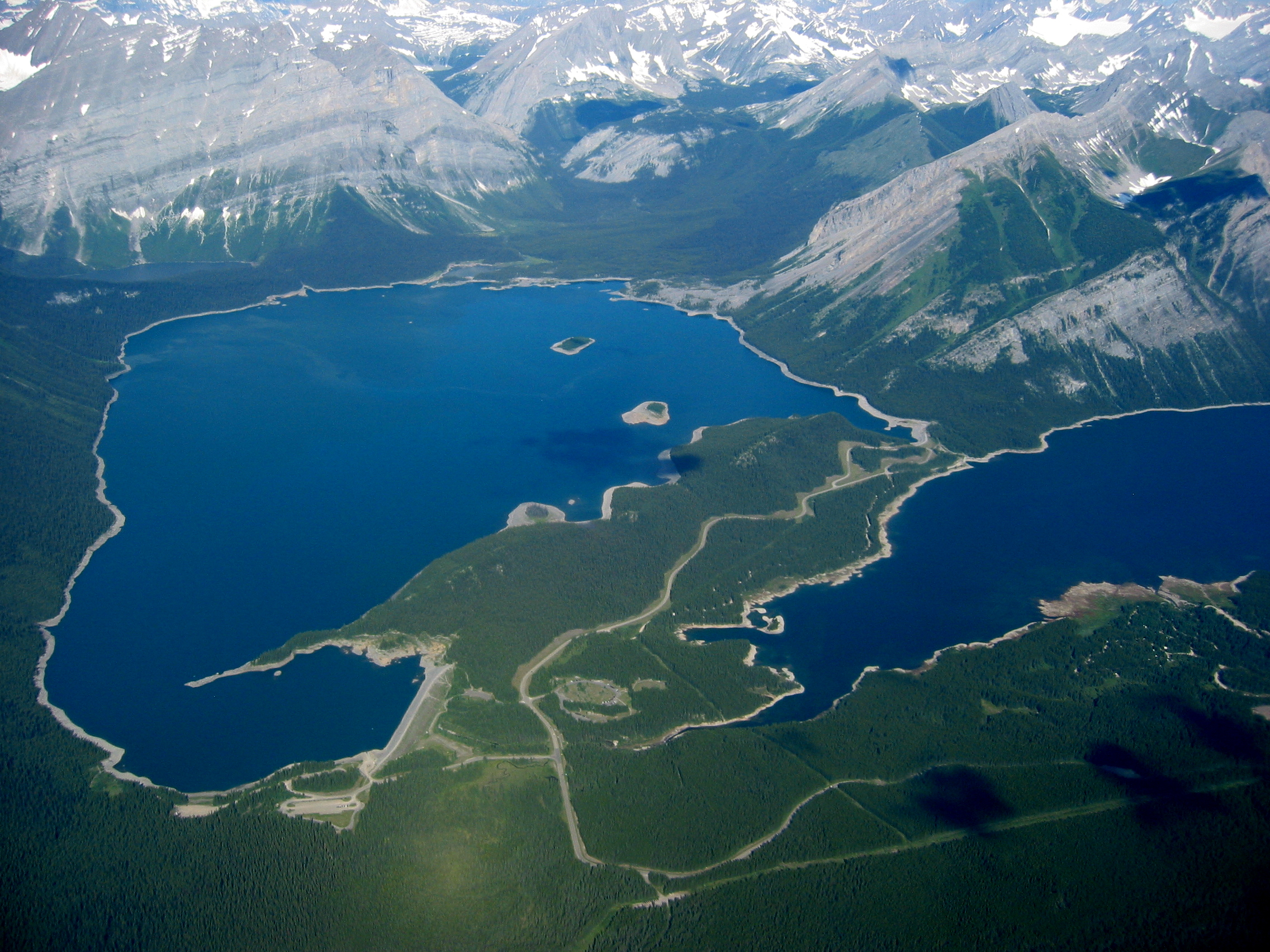
- Kananaskis Lake

- Location in Alberta Upper Kananaskis Lake (Canada)
- Location: Kananaskis, Alberta
- Coordinates: 50°37′05″N 115°09′15″W
- Type: Reservoir, oligotrophic
- Primary inflows: Upper Kananaskis River
- Primary outflows: Lower Kananaskis Lake
- Catchment area: 139 km^{2} (54 sq mi)
- Basin countries: Canada
- Surface area: 7.8 km^{2} (3.0 sq mi)
- Average depth: 32 m (105 ft)
- Max. depth: 108 m (354 ft)
- Surface elevation: 1,720 m (5,640 ft)

Upper Kananaskis Lake (Stoney Ozade Îmne) is a natural lake that was turned into a reservoir in Kananaskis Country in Alberta, Canada.

Upper Kananaskis Lake, along with the Lower Kananaskis Lake, is located in Peter Lougheed Provincial Park .

The lake is part of a series of natural and man made lakes in the Kananaskis and Bow Valleys used for hydro electric power, flood control, and water reserves for the Bow River water users such as the city of Calgary.

The lake is also used for recreational activities, with hiking paths surrounding the lake (and cross-country skiing trails in the winter).

== Names ==
In Stoney Nakoda, the upper and lower Kananaskis lakes are known together as Ozade Îmne, meaning "y-shaped-fork lake". According to the Stoney Nakoda elders Walter Simeon and Wallace Ear, the name refers to the y-shaped confluence of the Kananaskis and Bow rivers.

== Hiking trails ==
- Upper Kananaskis Lake Circuit
- Rawson Lake Trail
- Aster Lake Route (also goes to Hidden Lake)
- Three Isle Lake Trail
- Maude-Lawson Trail (To Lawson Lake)
- Mount Indefatigable Trail
- Elk Pass Trail (To Fox, Frozen, Upper Elk, and Lower Elk Lakes)
- Northover Ridge Route

== Climate ==
Based on the Köppen climate classification, this vicinity is located in a subarctic climate with cold, snowy winters, and mild summers. Temperatures can drop below −20 C with wind chill factors below −30 C.

Climate data for Kananaskis Pocaterra, Alberta (1981-2010):1610m
Month	Jan	Feb	Mar	Apr	May	Jun	Jul	Aug	Sep	Oct	Nov	Dec	Year
Record high °C (°F)	11.5 (52.7)	12.0 (53.6)	16.0 (60.8)	24.5 (76.1)	28.5 (83.3)	28.0 (82.4)	32.0 (89.6)	33.0 (91.4)	30.0 (86.0)	25.5 (77.9)	15.5 (59.9)	12.0 (53.6)	33.0 (91.4)
Mean daily maximum °C (°F)	−2.8 (27.0)	−0.4 (31.3)	3.2 (37.8)	7.9 (46.2)	13.3 (55.9)	16.9 (62.4)	20.6 (69.1)	20.5 (68.9)	15.6 (60.1)	9.4 (48.9)	1.0 (33.8)	−3.6 (25.5)	8.5 (47.2)
Daily mean °C (°F)	−9.7 (14.5)	−8.1 (17.4)	−3.9 (25.0)	1.1 (34.0)	5.9 (42.6)	9.4 (48.9)	12.1 (53.8)	11.6 (52.9)	7.5 (45.5)	2.4 (36.3)	−5.0 (23.0)	−10.1 (13.8)	1.1 (34.0)
Mean daily minimum °C (°F)	−16.5 (2.3)	−15.8 (3.6)	−11.0 (12.2)	−5.8 (21.6)	−1.6 (29.1)	1.9 (35.4)	3.5 (38.3)	2.7 (36.9)	−0.8 (30.6)	−4.6 (23.7)	−10.9 (12.4)	−16.5 (2.3)	−6.3 (20.7)
Record low °C (°F)	−44.0 (−47.2)	−42.0 (−43.6)	−39.5 (−39.1)	−25.5 (−13.9)	−17.0 (1.4)	−6.1 (21.0)	−12.0 (10.4)	−6.0 (21.2)	−16.0 (3.2)	−26.0 (−14.8)	−37.0 (−34.6)	−42.8 (−45.0)	−44.0 (−47.2)
Average precipitation mm (inches)	37.8 (1.49)	28.5 (1.12)	34.7 (1.37)	44.6 (1.76)	67.1 (2.64)	91.5 (3.60)	56.9 (2.24)	56.4 (2.22)	43.0 (1.69)	36.6 (1.44)	40.6 (1.60)	30.5 (1.20)	568.2 (22.37)
Average snowfall cm (inches)	36.9 (14.5)	28.2 (11.1)	34.6 (13.6)	36.3 (14.3)	22.3 (8.8)	2.5 (1.0)	0.3 (0.1)	0.3 (0.1)	8.7 (3.4)	18.6 (7.3)	36.0 (14.2)	30.6 (12.0)	255.3 (100.4)
Source: Environment Canada

== In popular culture ==
Netflix series Can This Love Be Translated? which follows the romance between interpreter Joo Ho-jin and actress Cha Mu-hee. A pivotal aurora borealis scene between the leads in the drama was filmed in Upper Kananaskis Lake.

== Galery ==
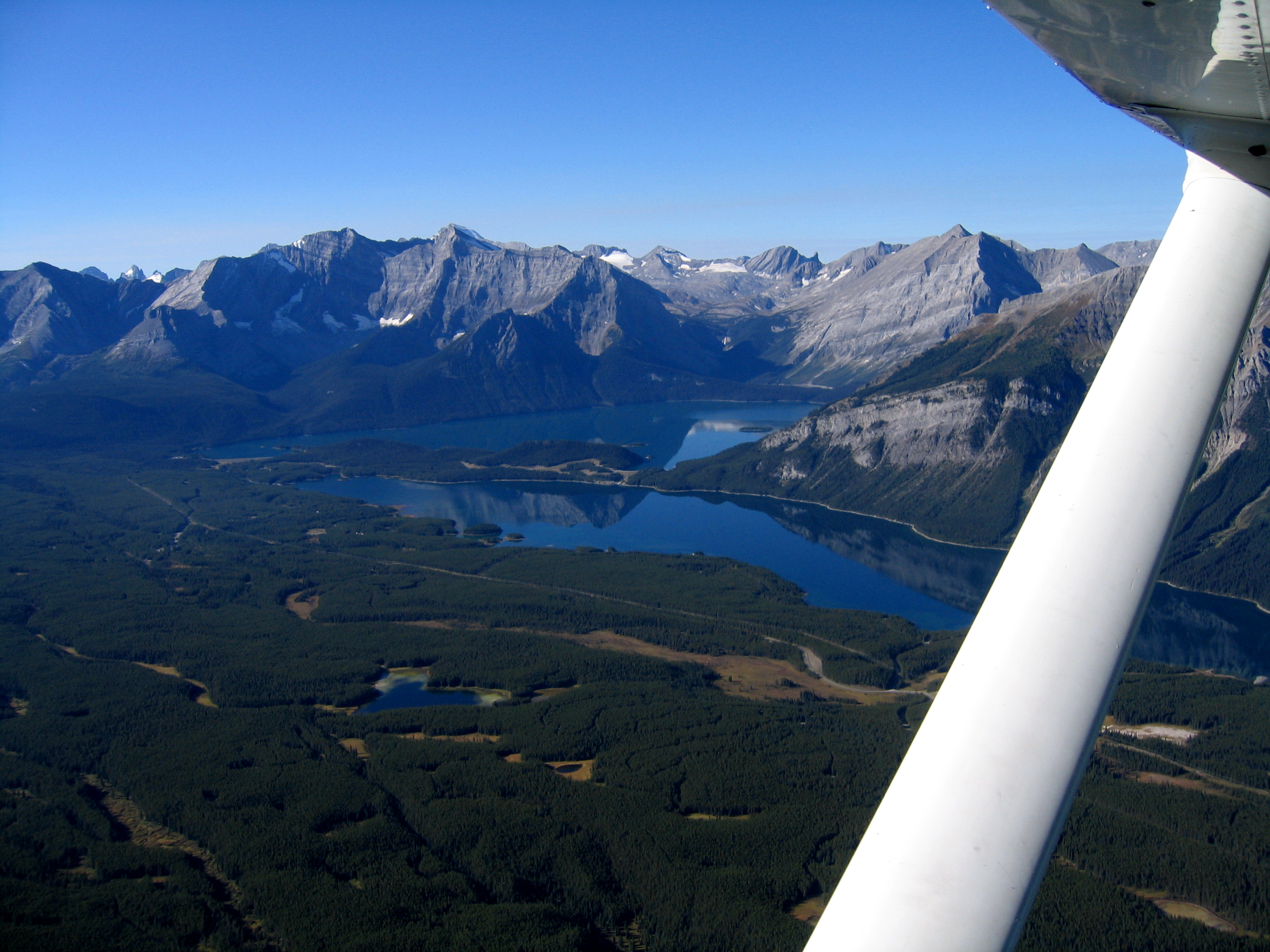
Lower and Upper Kananaskis Lakes

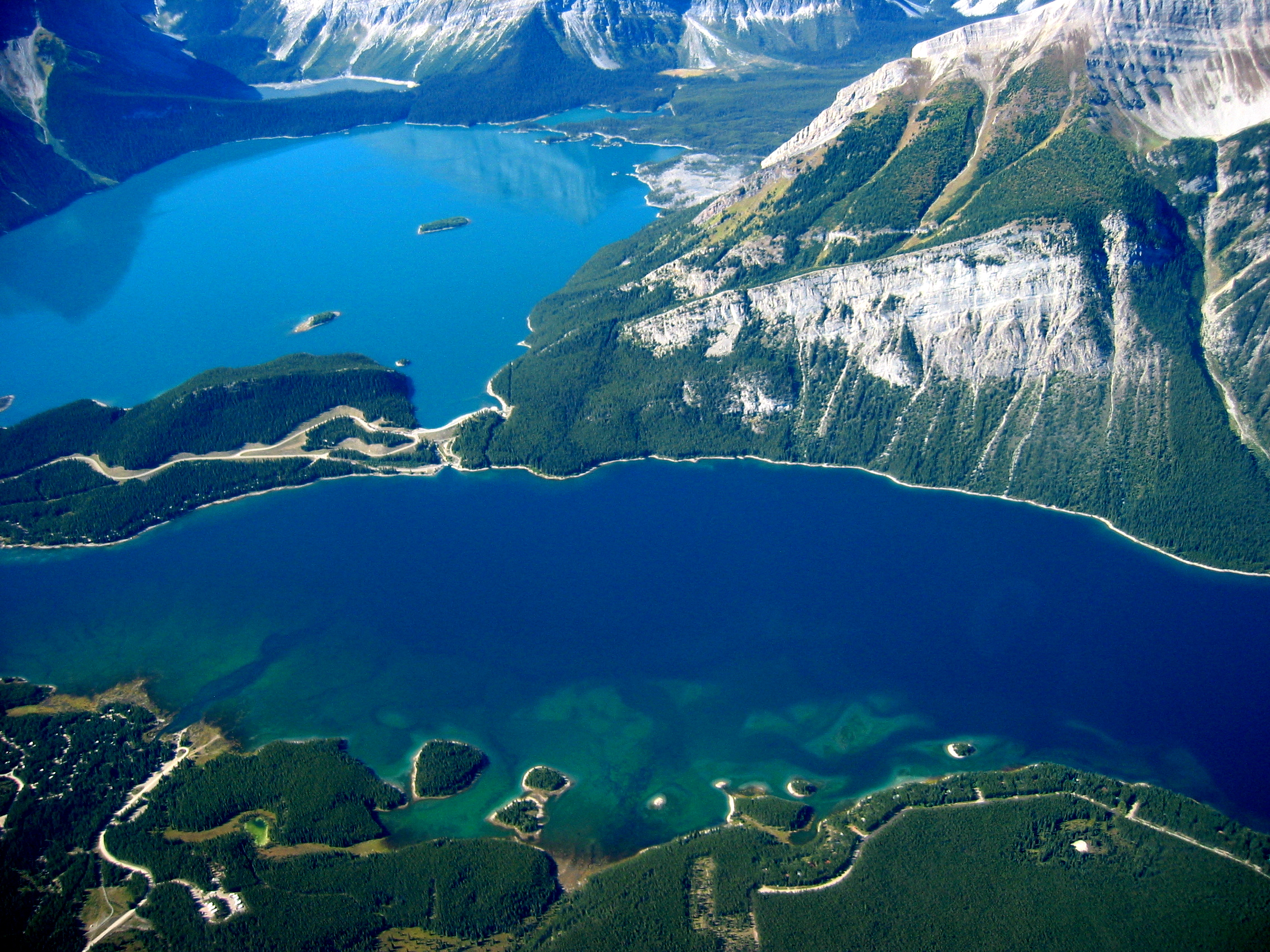
Upper and Lower Kananaskis Lakes

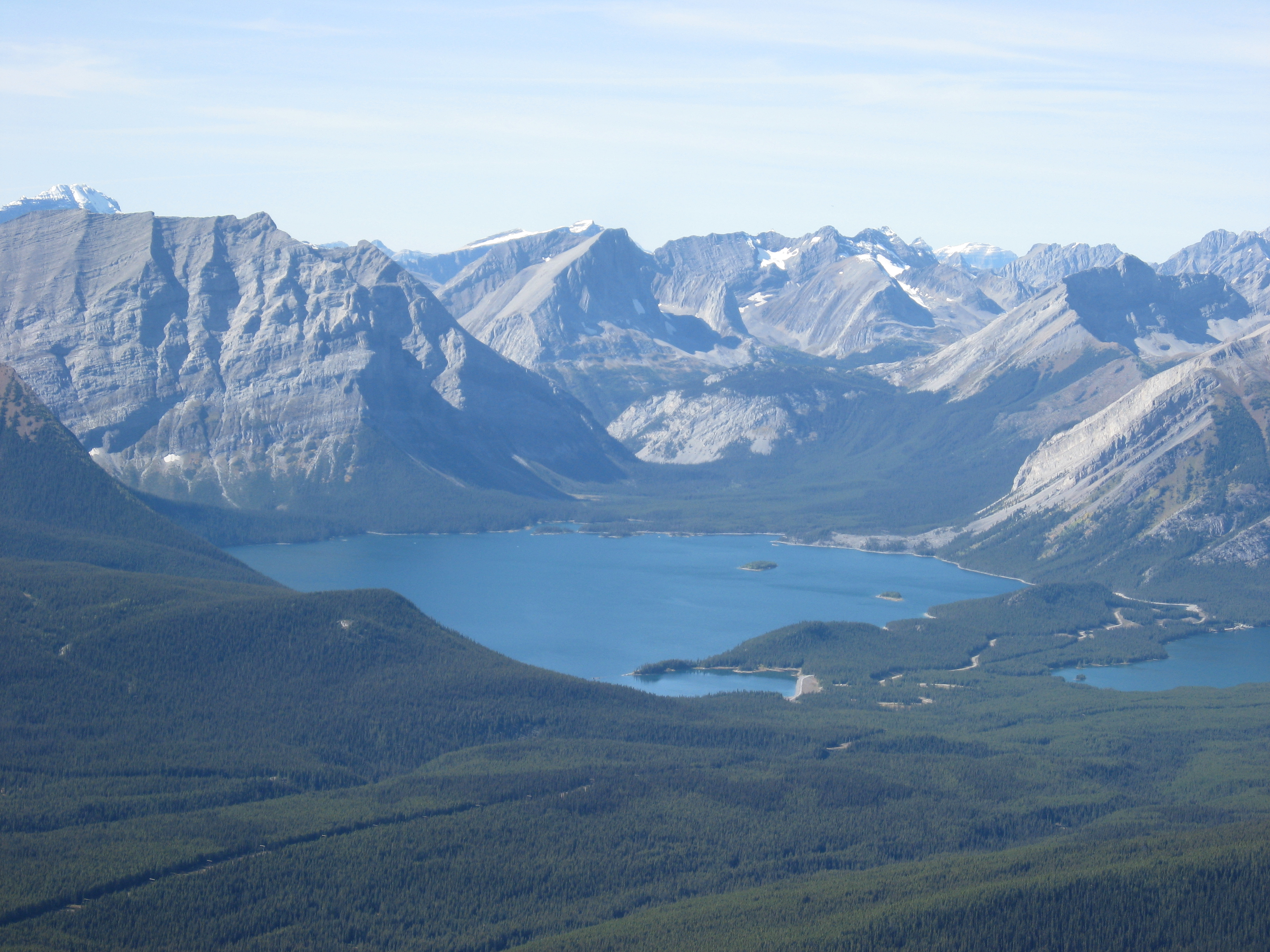
Upper Kananaskis Lake from the summit of Mount Tyrwhitt

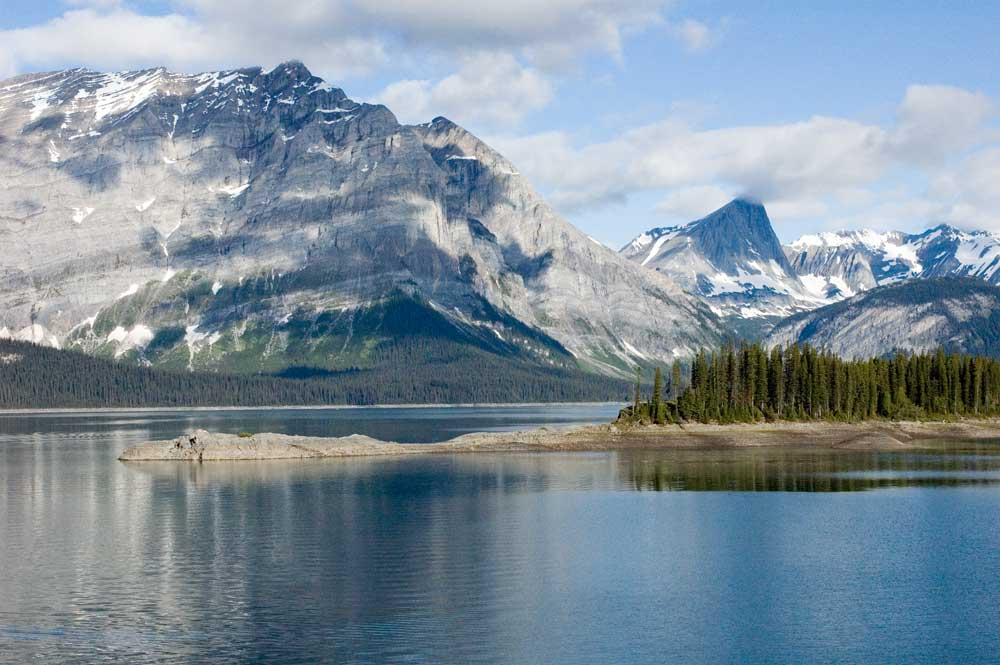
Upper Kananskis Lake and Mount Lyautey

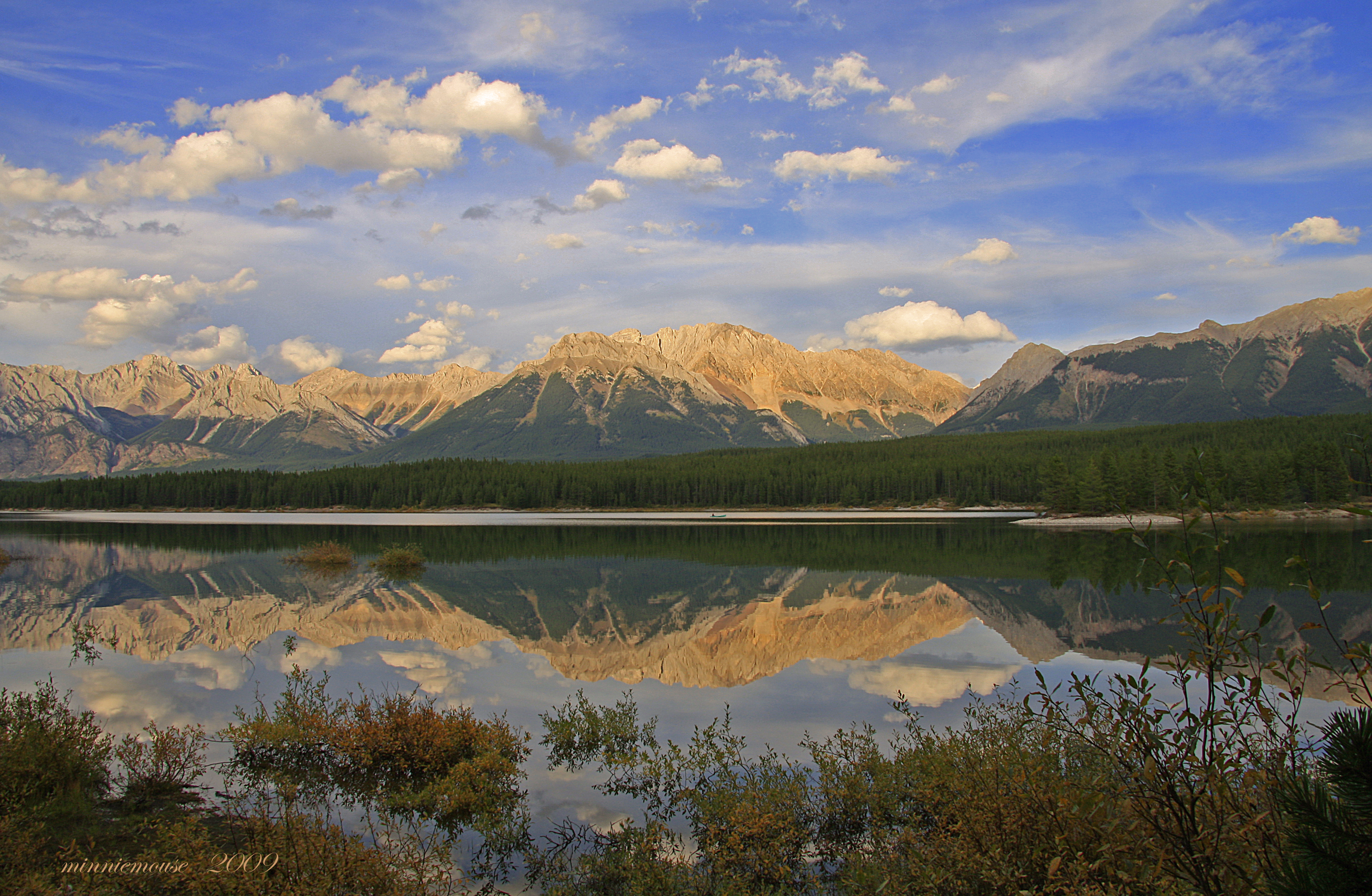
Elpoca Mountain and the Opal Range seen from Upper Kananaskis Lake
