= Elk Lakes Provincial Park =

Provincial park in British Columbia

- IUCN category II (national park)
- Location within British Columbia
- Interactive map of Elk Lakes Provincial Park
- Location: East Kootenay, British Columbia, Canada
- Coordinates: 50°31′38″N 115°05′34″W
- Area: 17,245 ha (66.58 sq mi)
- Designation: Provincial Park and Natural Area
- Established: May 18, 1973
- Governing body: BC Parks
- Website: Elk Lakes Provincial Park

Elk Lakes Provincial Park is a provincial park in southeastern British Columbia, Canada, located west of the continental divide (the British Columbia/Alberta border). It is located adjacent to Height of the Rockies Provincial Park and is about 104 kilometres north of Sparwood. The park features sub-alpine landscapes, remnant glaciers, rugged peaks and productive lakes.

== Access ==
Elk Lakes Park is about a two hours drive away from Sparwood, Canada. It is easily accessible, and has camping opportunities. The park shares a boundary with Peter Lougheed Park, with connecting trail routes. The old road linking the two parks is not open to motorized traffic.

=== Activities ===
There is a wide variety of hiking trails that are available, and not all trails located in the park are maintained. The park also has a wide variety of camping options, as there is a main camping area with two more rugged campsites further into the parkland.

== Geology ==
Much of the park is above the treeline, and features several prominent mountains including Mount Fox, Mount Aosta, Mount McCuaig, and Mount Elkan. The Petain, Castelnau, Nivelle, and Elk Glaciers lie on the northeastern edge of the park. The following lakes are also present inside park boundaries: Upper and Lower Elk Lake, Frozen Lake, Fox Lake, Cadorna Lake, and Abruzzi Lake.

Below the treeline, the park features mature growth forests of alpine fir, Engelmann spruce, and lodgepole pine. These trees are also intermingled with juniper, twinberry, false azalea, white rhododendron, and buffalo berry. The wildlife of the area includes Beaver, Snowshoe Hare, Red Squirrel, white-tailed deer, moose, and many varieties of birds.

== See also ==
- Continental Ranges
