= Height of the Rockies Provincial Park =

Provincial park in British Columbia, Canada

- IUCN category Ib (wilderness area)
- Location within British Columbia
- Interactive map of Height of the Rockies Provincial Park
- Location: East Kootenay, British Columbia, Canada
- Coordinates: 50°30′N 115°15′W
- Area: 54,170 ha (209.2 sq mi)
- Established: July 12, 1995
- Governing body: BC Parks

Height of the Rockies Provincial Park is a provincial park in the Canadian Rockies of south eastern British Columbia, Canada. It is located west of the Continental Divide (in this region, the British Columbia/Alberta Border), adjacent to Elk Lakes Provincial Park.

== Description and access ==
The park comprises 54,170 hectares (133,900 acres) in East Kootenay on the western side of the Continental Divide, which in this region forms the border between British Columbia and Alberta. It borders Elk Lakes Provincial Park, also in British Columbia, to which it is linked by a trail, and Banff National Park and Peter Lougheed Provincial Park in Alberta. The park lies east of Invermere; the closest communities are Elkford to the south and Canal Flats and Radium Hot Springs to the west. The park is accessible on foot or horseback via logging roads and trails to 6 trailheads. All mechanized access is forbidden, and there are no campgrounds or other park services in the park. The Great Divide Trail passes through the park.

The park is an Alpine environment with forested bottomland. It includes several lakes, the Palliser River valley, the Middle Fork of the White River, and the Royal Group of mountains. (Note: Mount Prince Albert, Mount Prince Edward, Mount Prince George, Mount Prince Henry, Mount Prince John, and Mount Princess Mary; Mount Princess Margaret is nearby in Banff National Park.) It encompasses 26 peaks over 3,000 metres (9,800 ft). The highest peak, Mount Joffre (3,449 metres (11,316 ft)), is on the border with Alberta. There are seven important mountain passes.

== Wildlife ==
The park is important habitat for wildlife, in particular grizzly bears, and also contains large numbers of black bears, moose, mule deer, bighorn sheep, northern Rocky Mountain wolves, and cougars. There are more than 2,000 elk and one of the highest densities of mountain goats in the world. Cutthroat trout are plentiful in many lakes and streams and are taken from the park for the Kootenay native species stocking program. Hunting, trapping, and fishing are permitted at controlled levels.

The park is at one end of the Southern Rocky Mountain Management Plan, aimed at coordinating ecosystem preservation and providing wildlife corridors, in particular for grizzly bears. Also to provide more comprehensive protection of the environment and wildlife habitat, British Columbia has considered asking the United Nations to add Height of the Rockies and 5 other provincial parks to the Canadian Rocky Mountain Parks World Heritage Site.

== History ==
The passes through what is now the park were used by the Kootenai Indians and by mid-19th-century European explorers. Two archaeological sites over 8,000 years old have been identified on the Middle Fork of the White River.

A national park was proposed early in the 20th century. In 1936 the White River Game Reserve was established. However, construction of logging roads and clearcutting became so extensive in the Southern Canadian Rockies that by 1986, the area that is now the park had become the last major refuge for wildlife in the region. Two provincial environmental organisations, BC Spaces for Nature and the Palliser Wilderness Society, with guide outfitter Hiram Cody Tegart, led a campaign to protect it permanently by making it a wilderness park, and in 1987, after a twelve-year process of negotiation between government, conservationists, hunting guides and outfitters, and logging companies, it became the first Forest Wilderness Area in British Columbia. In 1995 it became a Class A Provincial Park. It was part of the Kootenays regional plan, which created 16 new provincial parks and sought to protect both logging jobs and wilderness areas.

== See also ==
- Continental Ranges
