= Don Getty Wildland Provincial Park =

Park in southern Alberta, Canada

- IUCN category Ib (wilderness area)
- Location within Alberta Location within Canada
- Location: Kananaskis Country, Alberta, Canada
- Nearest city: Claresholm
- Coordinates: 51°00′00″N 115°00′00″W
- Area: 62,775 hectares (155,120 acres)
- Established: 24 July 2001
- Governing body: Alberta Tourism, Parks and Recreation

Don Getty Wildland Provincial Park is a wildland provincial park in Kananaskis Country, Alberta, Canada. It was created on 24 July 2001 and has an area of 62,775 hectares (628 km^{2}; 242 mi^{2}). The park was named for the 11th premier of Alberta, Don Getty. The park was designated as part of the Special Places 2000: Alberta’s Natural Heritage initiative.

== Location ==
Don Getty WPP is not one continuous tract but sixteen separate parcels stretching 200 kilometres (120 mi) from north to south. The park is on the eastern slopes of the Rocky Mountains.

The three northern-most parcels are north of Canmore, the Bow River and the Trans-Canada Highway. The first is north of the Ghost River and borders the Ghost River Wilderness Area to the west. The northwest edge of the park borders Banff National Park. This parcel is the headwaters of Waiporous Creek. This parcel contains Black Rock Mountain and Devil's Head. The second parcel is south of the Ghost River and north of Banff Nation Park. It borders the Ghost River Wilderness Area to the west. This parcel contains the slopes of Mount Costigan and Phantom Crag. These two parcels would be continuous except for the Ghost River valley. The third parcel is the headwaters of the South Ghost River and borders Banff National Park to the north and west and Bow Valley Wildland Provincial Park to the southwest. It borders the Reserve of the Stoney Nakoda First Nation to the east. This parcel includes Association Peak and End Mountain as well as slopes of Orient Point and Saddle Peak.

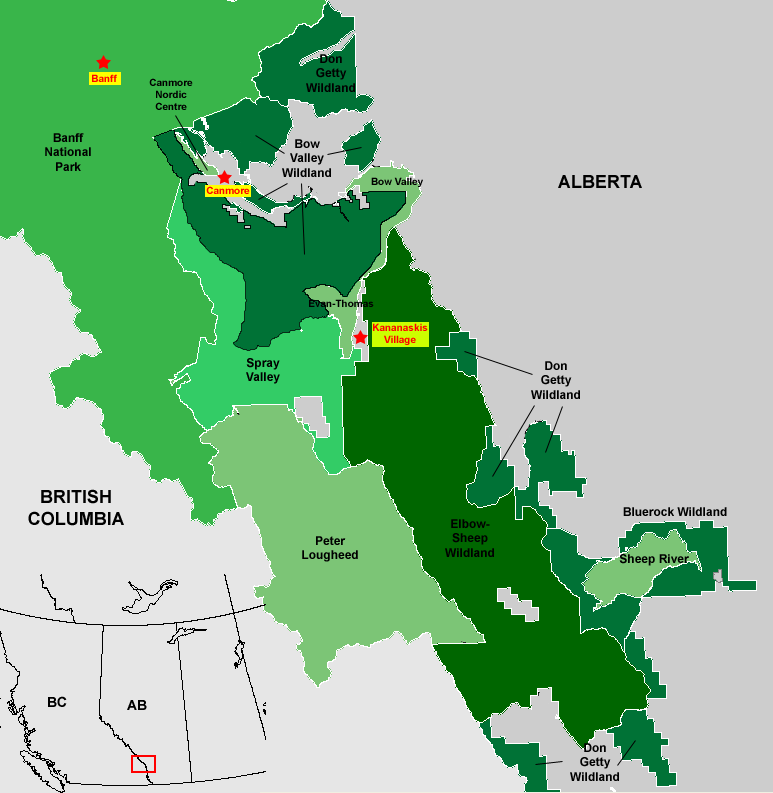
Extent and locations of parks in Kananaskis Country

The parcels south of the Bow River are part of Kananaskis Country. There is a parcel on the upper Canyon Creek west of the Powderface Trail bordering Elbow-Sheep Wildland Provincial Park on the north, west, and south. There are two parcels on the west and east of Little Elbow Provincial Recreation Area at the southwest end of Highway 66. The western parcel borders Elbow-Sheep WPP on the north, west, and south and includes the eastern faces of Mount Cornwall, Mount Glasgow, Outlaw Peak & Banded Peak. The eastern parcel is east of the Elbow River and contains Forgetmenot Ridge and Forgetmenot and Threepoint Mountains . This parcel borders Elbow-Sheep WPP and Bluerock Wildland Provincial Park on the south.

Further south, there is a parcel east of the Junction Mountain and west of the Junction Mountain fire lookout tower bordering both Elbow-Sheep WPP and Bluerock WPP to the west. South of this is another parcel adjoining Elbow-Sheep WPP to the north containing Mount Patterson, Mount Head, and Holy Cross Mountain in the Highwood Range. This parcel is north and east of the Highwood River, east of Highway 40, and north of Highway 541. Another parcel is south of the Highwood River and Highway 40, north of Cataract Creek Provincial Recreation Area, and east of Highway 940. The parcel is centered on the valley of Cataract Creek. Going further south, there are five parcels in the Livingstone Range surrounding Mount Livingstone Natural Area. They are east of Highway 40 and the Livingstone River, south of Highway 532, and north of Bob Creek Wildland Provincial Park.

To the west, lies a long, thin strip on the eastern slopes of the Continental Divide, the border with British Columbia. It starts at Mount Odlum at the Elbow-Sheep WPP boundary. It runs south to Mount Gass and borders the Beehive Natural Area. This strip is over 40 kilometres (25 mi) long and varies from 200 metres (660 ft) to 5 kilometres (3.1 mi) wide.

== Ecology ==
The Don Getty WPP parcels connect with existing protected spaces and add ecological integrity, continuity, and contiguity to adjacent protected areas that preserve the natural heritage. The park contains alpine, sub-alpine, and montane ecosystems regions in the Natural Regions Framework for Alberta. Because the park covers such an extensive area, it contains samples of several ecodistricts in the National Ecological Framework for Canada used by Environment and Climate Change Canada.

Environment Canada Classification System Ecological Areas:
Ecodistrict	Ecoprovince	Ecoregion	Ecozone
Ram River Foothills	Western Alberta Upland	Boreal Foothills	Boreal Plains
Bragg Creek Foothills	Western Alberta Upland	Boreal Foothills	Boreal Plains
Black Diamond Upland	Aspen Parkland	Parkland Prairies	Prairies
Willow Creek Upland	Fescue Grassland	Central Grassland	Prairies
Banff Mountains	Eastern Continental Ranges	Columbia Montane Cordillera	Montane Cordillera
Morley Foothills	Northern Continental Divide	Columbia Montane Cordillera	Montane Cordillera
Crowsnest Mountains	Northern Continental Divide	Columbia Montane Cordillera	Montane Cordillera
Blairmore Foothills	Northern Continental Divide	Columbia Montane Cordillera	Montane Cordillera

The park also contains one of the deepest known caves in Alberta at Forgetmenot Pot on the south end of Forgetmenot Ridge. There are examples of several well-preserved periglacial features in the park: felsenmeer, stone stripes and stone polygons. The park includes Cataract Creek, "one of Alberta's finest walk-in trout fishing streams".

== Activities ==
Motorized vehicles are not permitted in the park. Backcountry camping, hiking, and mountain biking are permitted; there are no developed facilities. Hunting and fishing are allowed with authorization.

== See also ==
- List of Alberta provincial parks
- List of Canadian provincial parks
- Ecology of the Rocky Mountains
