= Jerram =

Jerram is a surname. Notable people with the surname include:

- Arnold Escombe Jerram 1906–1910
- Charles Jerram (1770–1853), Church of England vicar
- Dougal Jerram (born 1969), British earth scientist
- George Jerram (1904–1948), Australian rules footballer
- Luke Jerram (born 1974), British modern installation artist
- Martyn Jerram (1858–1933), Royal Navy officer
- Mary Jerram (born 1945), Australian State Coroner
- Nigel Jerram (1900–1968), English cricketer
- Sidney Jerram (1891—1959), Welsh rugby player
