= Gap Mountain (Alberta) =

Mountain in Alberta, Canada

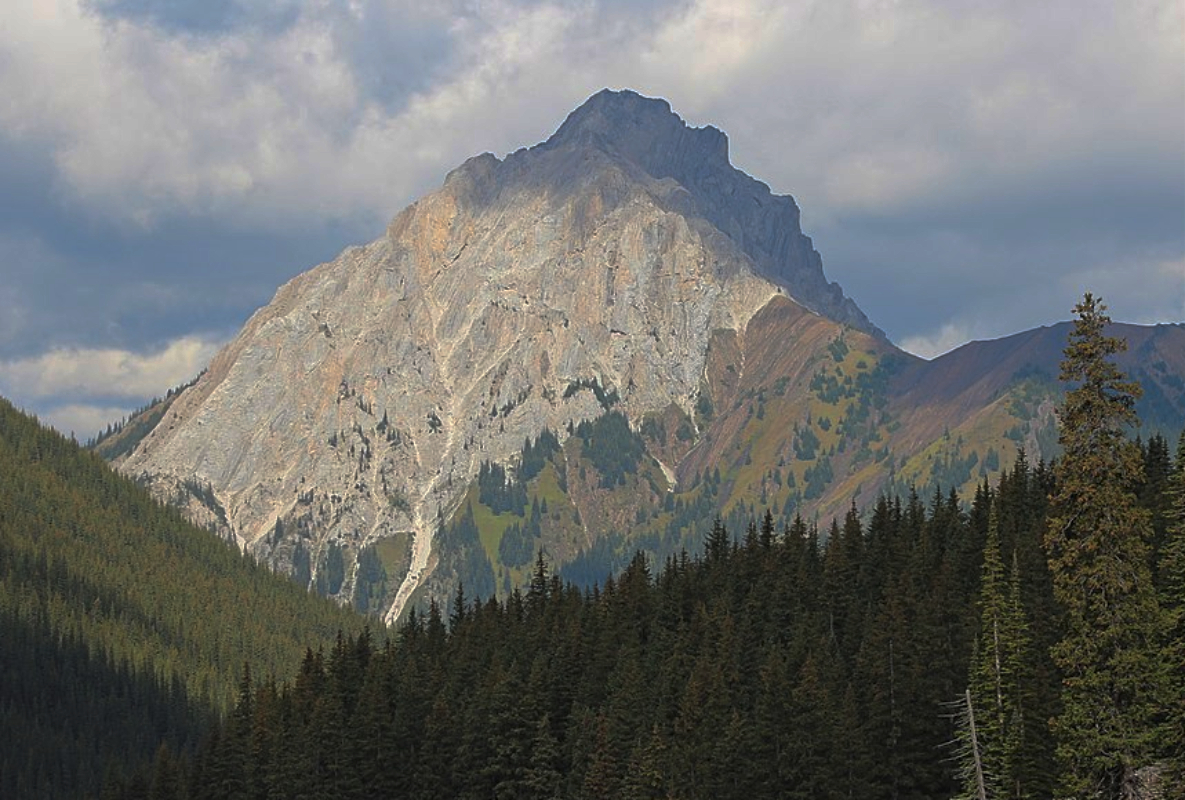
- Gap Mountain from Highway 40 at Highwood Pass

Highest point
- Elevation: 2,675 m (8,776 ft)
- Prominence: 282 m (925 ft)
- Parent peak: Elpoca Mountain (3,036 m)
- Listing: Mountains of Alberta
- Coordinates: 50°39′22″N 115°03′15″W

Geography
- Location within Alberta Location within Canada
- Interactive map of Gap Mountain
- Location: Alberta, Canada
- Parent range: Opal Range; Canadian Rockies
- Topo map: NTS 82J11 Kananaskis Lakes

Geology
- Rock age: Cambrian
- Rock type: Limestone

Climbing
- Easiest route: Scramble on eastern side

Gap Mountain is a 2,675-metre (8,776-foot) mountain summit located at the southern end of the Opal Range in the Canadian Rockies of Alberta, Canada. The nearest higher neighbor is Elpoca Mountain, 2 km (1.2 mi) to the east. Gap Mountain is situated 5 km (3.1 mi) south of Mount Wintour, within Peter Lougheed Provincial Park. Gap Mountain is a conspicuous peak seen from Alberta Highway 40 at Highwood Pass. It is a popular climbing destination because it offers exposed scrambling on its eastern flanks with excellent summit views of Kananaskis Country.

== History ==
George Pocaterra named it for its location at the gap between the Opal Range and Elk Range. The mountain's toponym was officially adopted in 1978 by the Geographical Names Board of Canada.

== Geology ==
Gap Mountain is composed of limestone laid down during the Precambrian to Jurassic periods. Formed in shallow seas, this sedimentary rock was pushed east and over the top of younger rock during the Laramide orogeny. Gap Mountain was created during the Lewis Overthrust. The steeply tilted strata are virtually the same in each peak of the Opal Range, with softer layers sandwiched between harder layers.

== Climate ==
Based on the Köppen climate classification, Gap Mountain is located in a subarctic climate zone with cold, snowy winters, and mild summers. Temperatures can drop below −20 °C (−4 °F) with wind chill factors below −30 °C (−22 °F).

June through September offer the most favorable weather to climb or view Gap Mountain.

Precipitation runoff from the mountain drains into Pocaterra Creek, a tributary of the Kananaskis River.

== Gallery ==
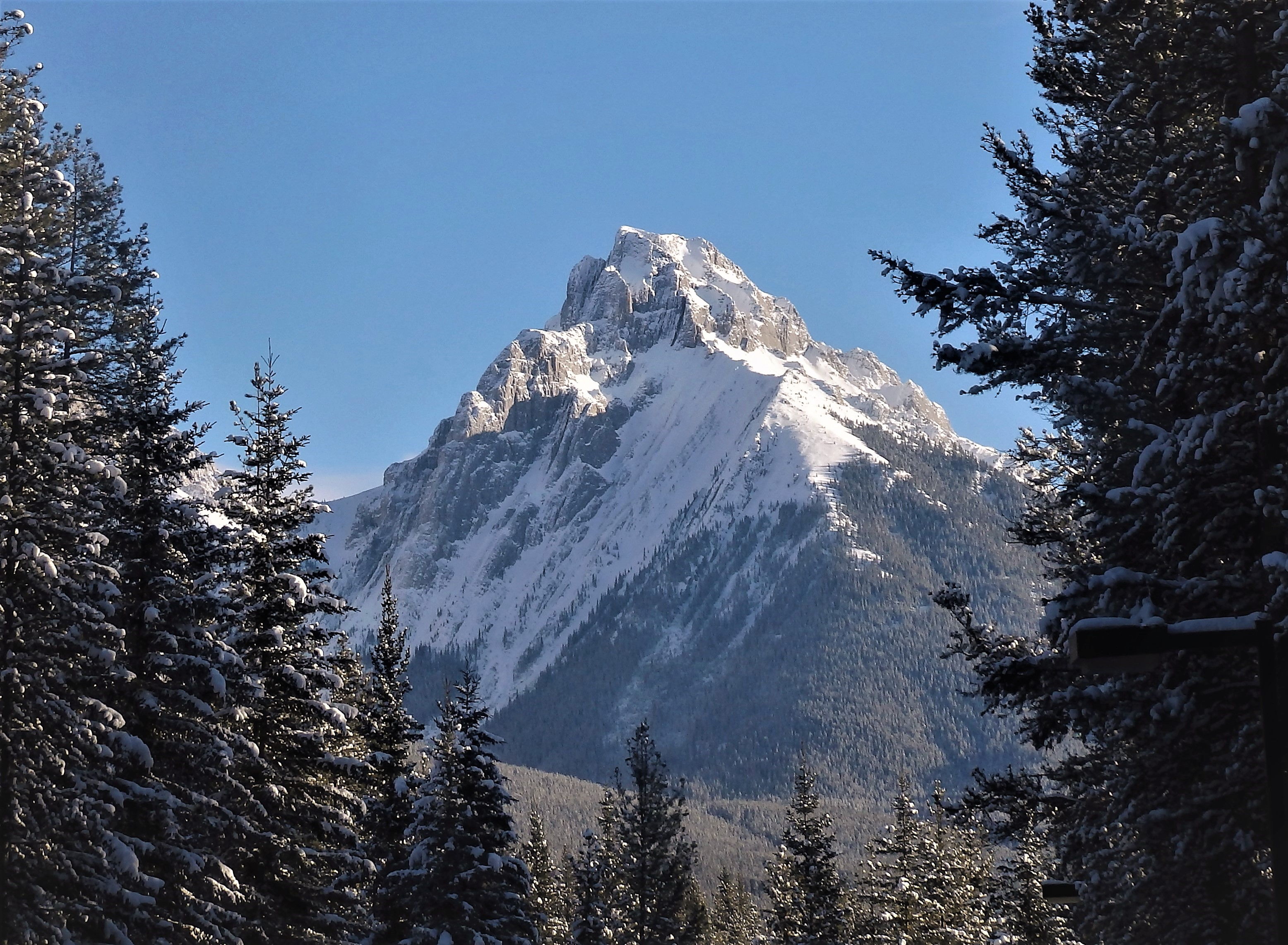
Southwest aspect in winter

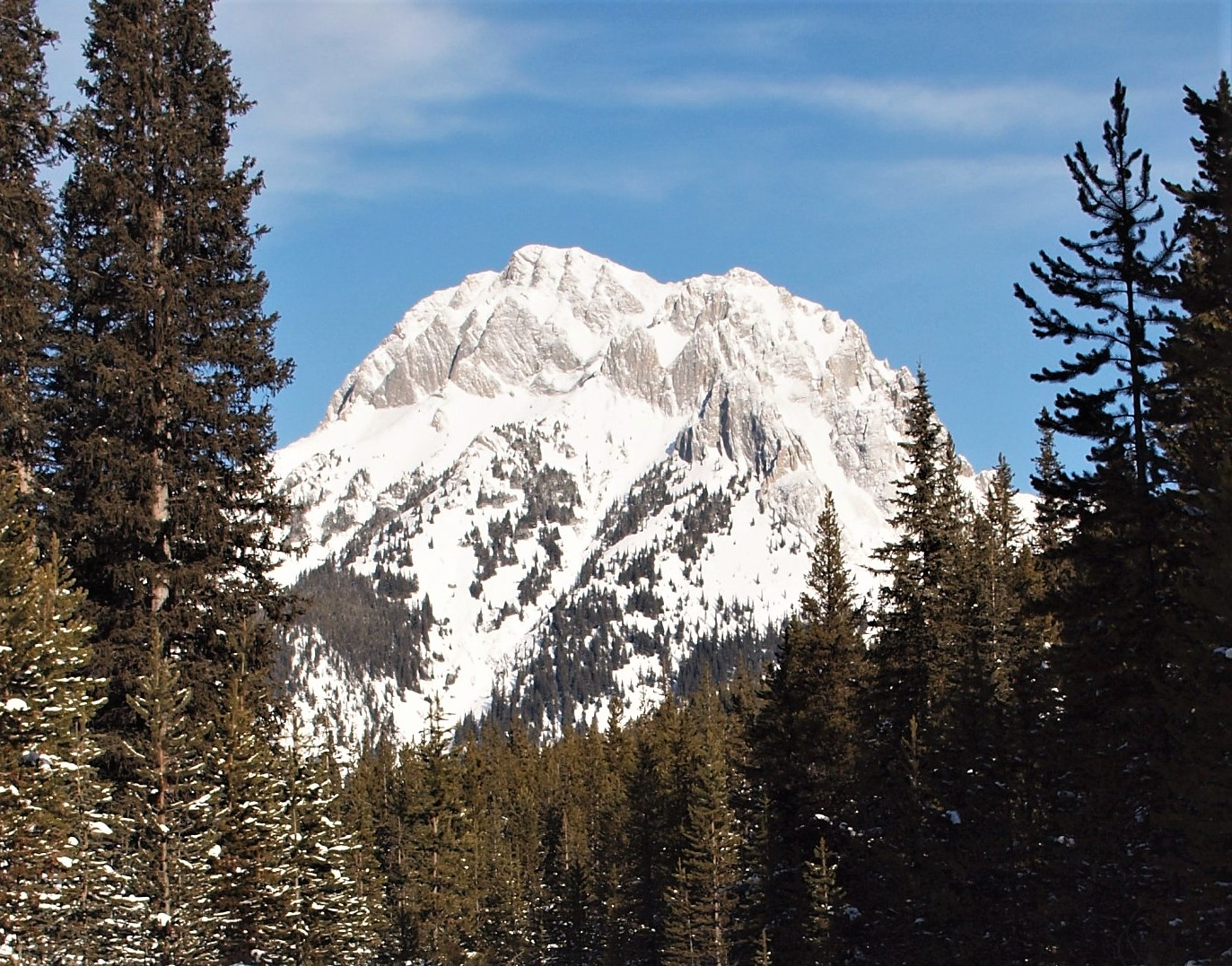
Northwest aspect in winter

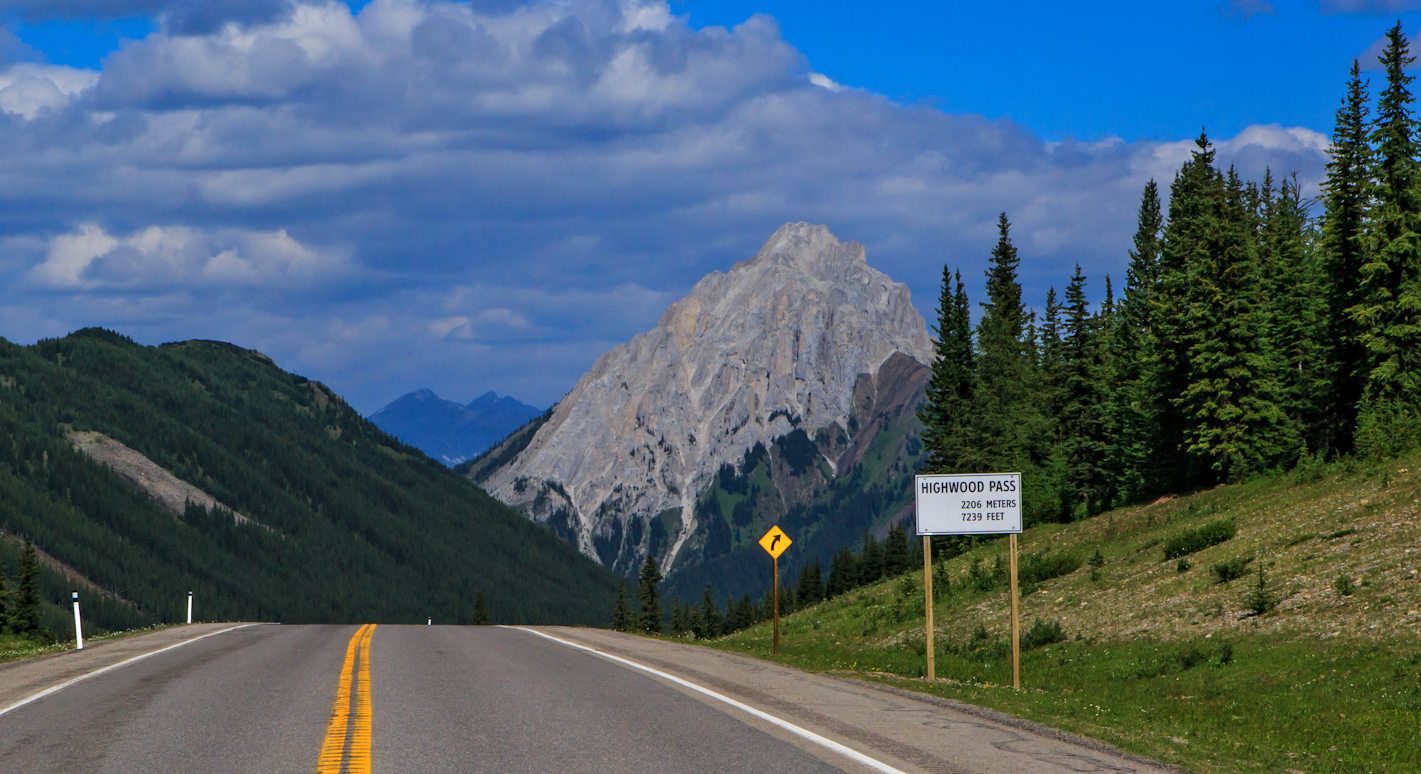
Highwood Pass and Gap Mountain

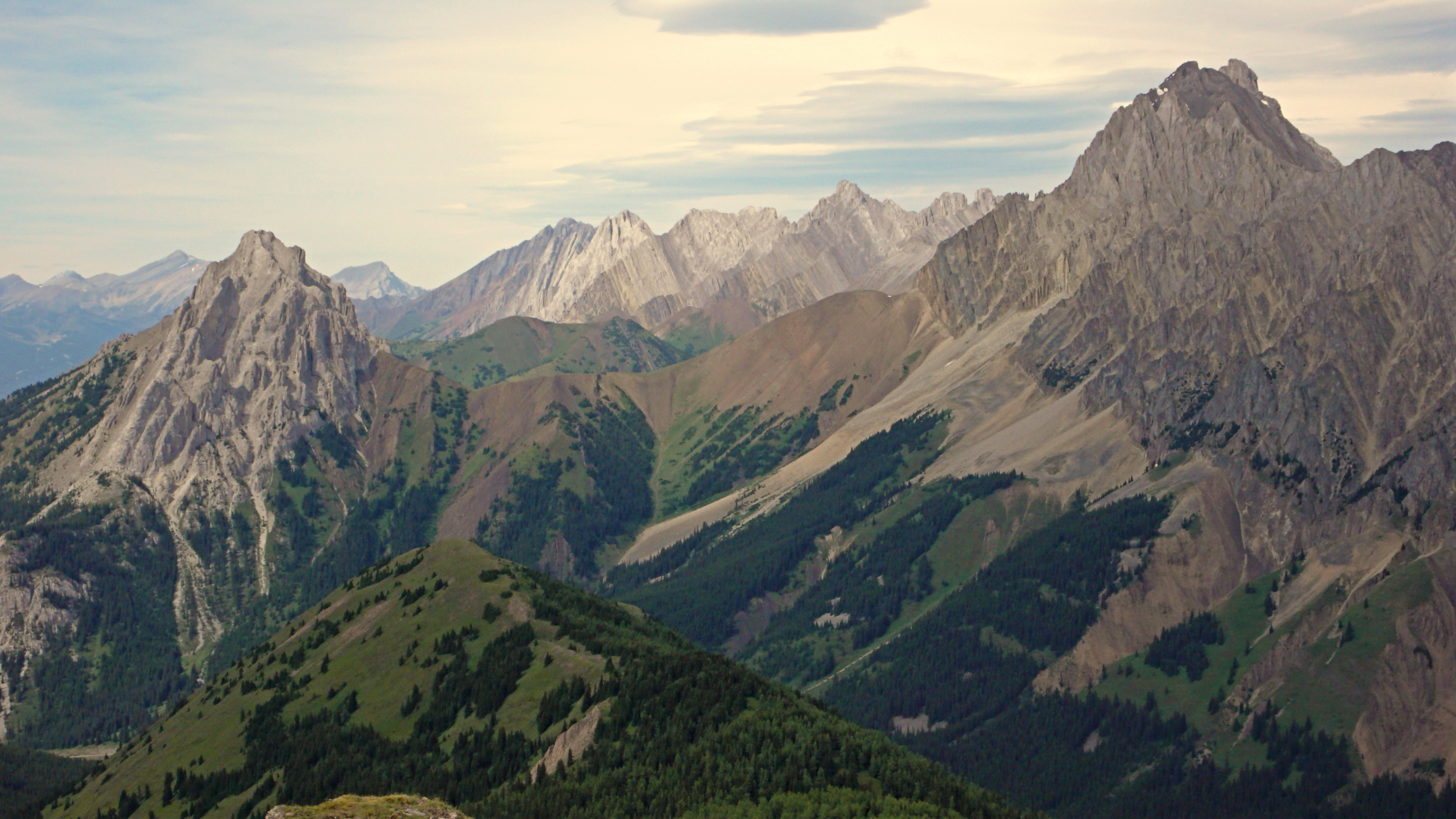
Gap Mountain (left) and Elpoca Mountain (right)

== See also ==
- List of mountains of Canada
- Geography of Alberta
