= Banded Peak =

Banded Peak may refer to:

- Banded Peak (Alberta), a mountain in Alberta, Canada
- Banded Peak (Antarctica), a mountain in Antarctica
