= Association Peak =

Mountain in Alberta, Canada

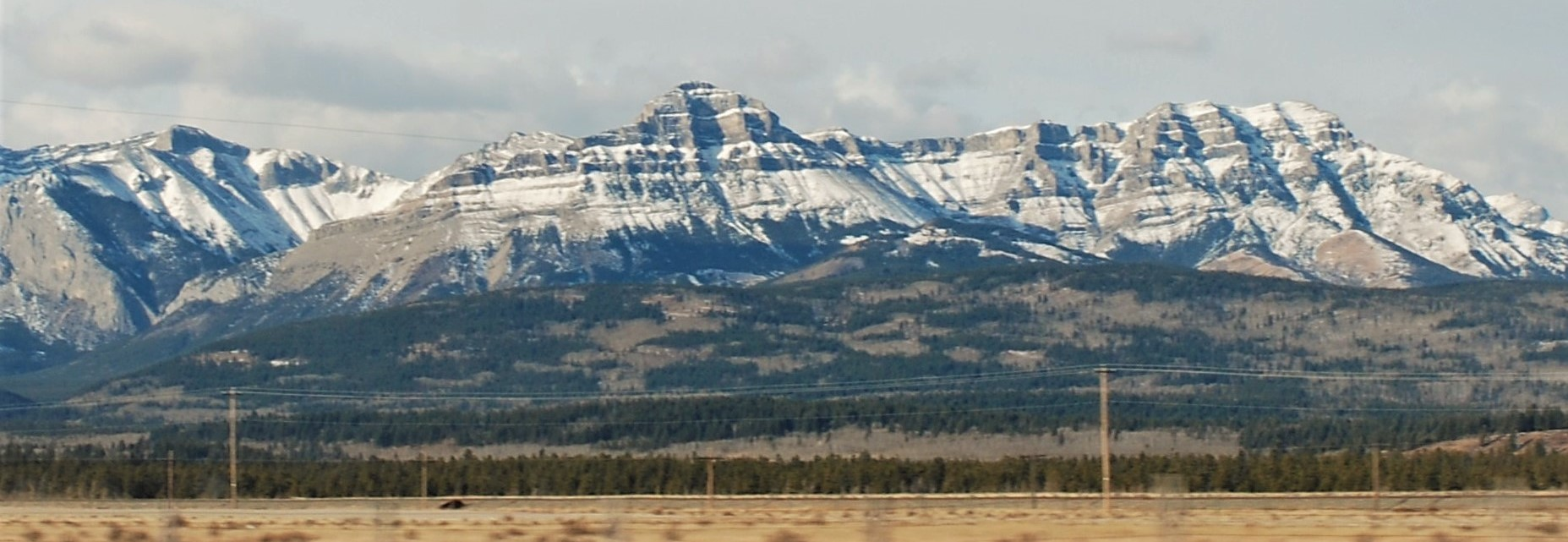
- East aspect of Association Peak (center) (End Mountain to the right)

Highest point
- Elevation: 2,362 m (7,749 ft)
- Prominence: 102 m (335 ft)
- Parent peak: End Mountain (2,453 m)
- Isolation: 1.58 km (0.98 mi)
- Listing: Mountains of Alberta
- Coordinates: 51°10′50″N 115°07′34″W

Naming
- Etymology: Indian Association of Alberta

Geography
- Location within Alberta Location within Canada
- Interactive map of Association Peak
- Country: Canada
- Province: Alberta
- District: Bighorn
- Protected area: Don Getty Wildland Provincial Park
- Parent range: Fairholme Range; Canadian Rockies
- Topo map: NTS 82O3 Canmore

Geology
- Mountain type: Fault block
- Rock type: Sedimentary rock

Climbing
- Easiest route: Association Peak Trail

Association Peak is a 2,362-metre (7,749 ft) mountain summit located in Alberta, Canada.

== Description ==
Association Peak is situated in Don Getty Wildland Provincial Park and the Fairholme Range which is a subset of the Canadian Rockies along the range's eastern front. It is set 18 km (11 mi) northeast of Canmore and six km north of Mount John Laurie. The nearest major city is Calgary, 75 km (47 mi) to the east. The mountain is visible from the Trans-Canada Highway which traverses the Bow Valley between Calgary and Banff National Park. Precipitation runoff from Association Peak drains north to the South Ghost River, and southeast to the Bow River via Old Fort Creek. Topographic relief is significant as the summit rises 800 m (2,600 ft) above the creek in 2 km (1.2 mi).

== History ==
The mountain's well-established toponym was officially adopted March 17, 1967, by the Geographical Names Board of Canada. Association Peak is named for the Indian Association of Alberta which was co-founded in 1939 by John Laurie, who had the mountain to the south named after him at the request of the Stoneys. Both peaks are located within two kilometres of Stoney Indian Reserve.

== Geology ==
Association Peak is composed of sedimentary rock laid down during the Precambrian to Jurassic periods. Formed in shallow seas, this sedimentary rock was pushed east and over the top of younger rock during the Laramide orogeny.

== Climate ==
Based on the Köppen climate classification, Association Peak is located in a subarctic climate zone with cold, snowy winters, and mild summers. Winter temperatures can drop below −20 °C with wind chill factors below −30 °C.

== Gallery ==
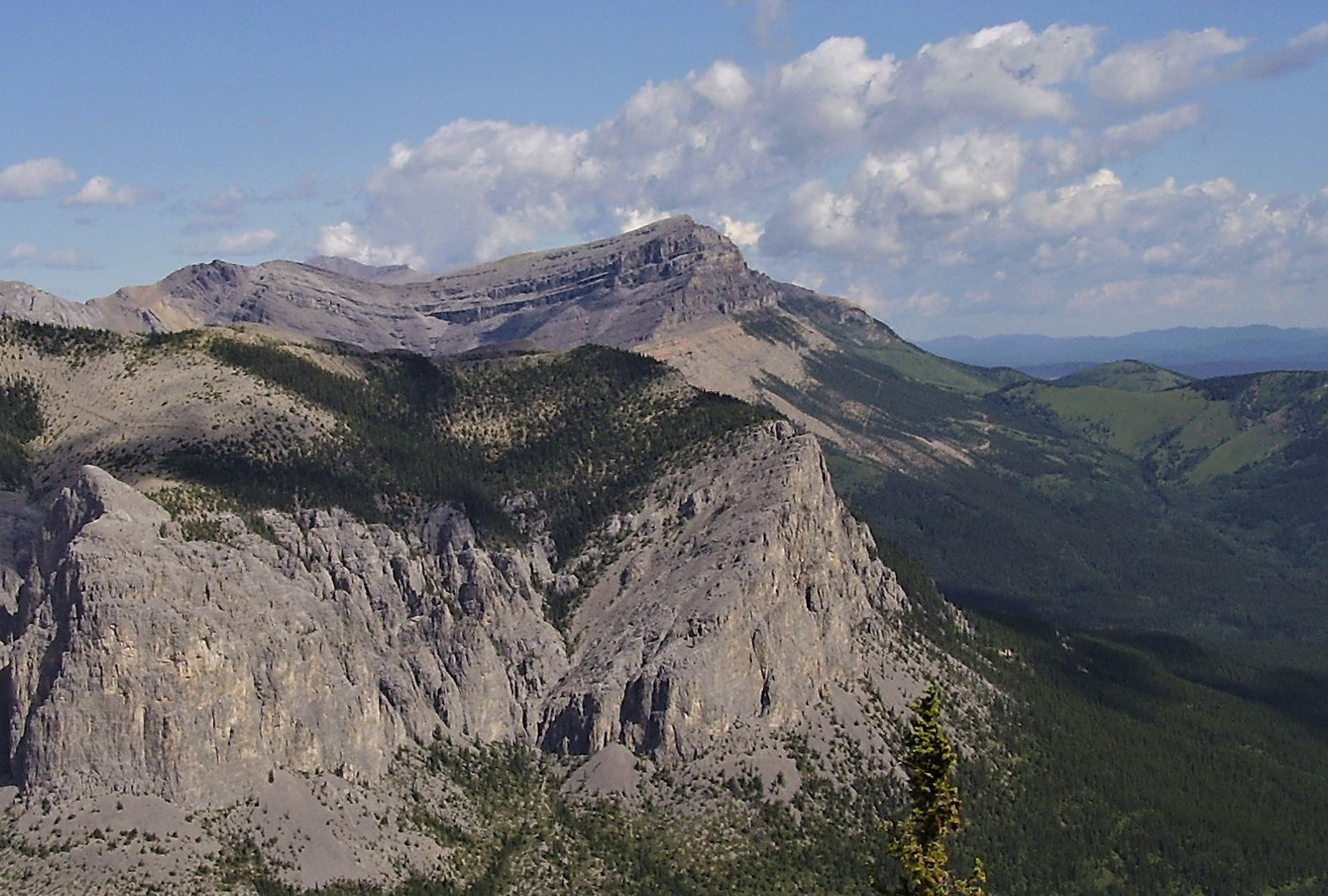
Association Peak centered at top, viewed from Mount Yamnuska

== See also ==
- Geography of Alberta
- Geology of Alberta
