= Outlaw Peak =

Mountain in Alberta, Canada

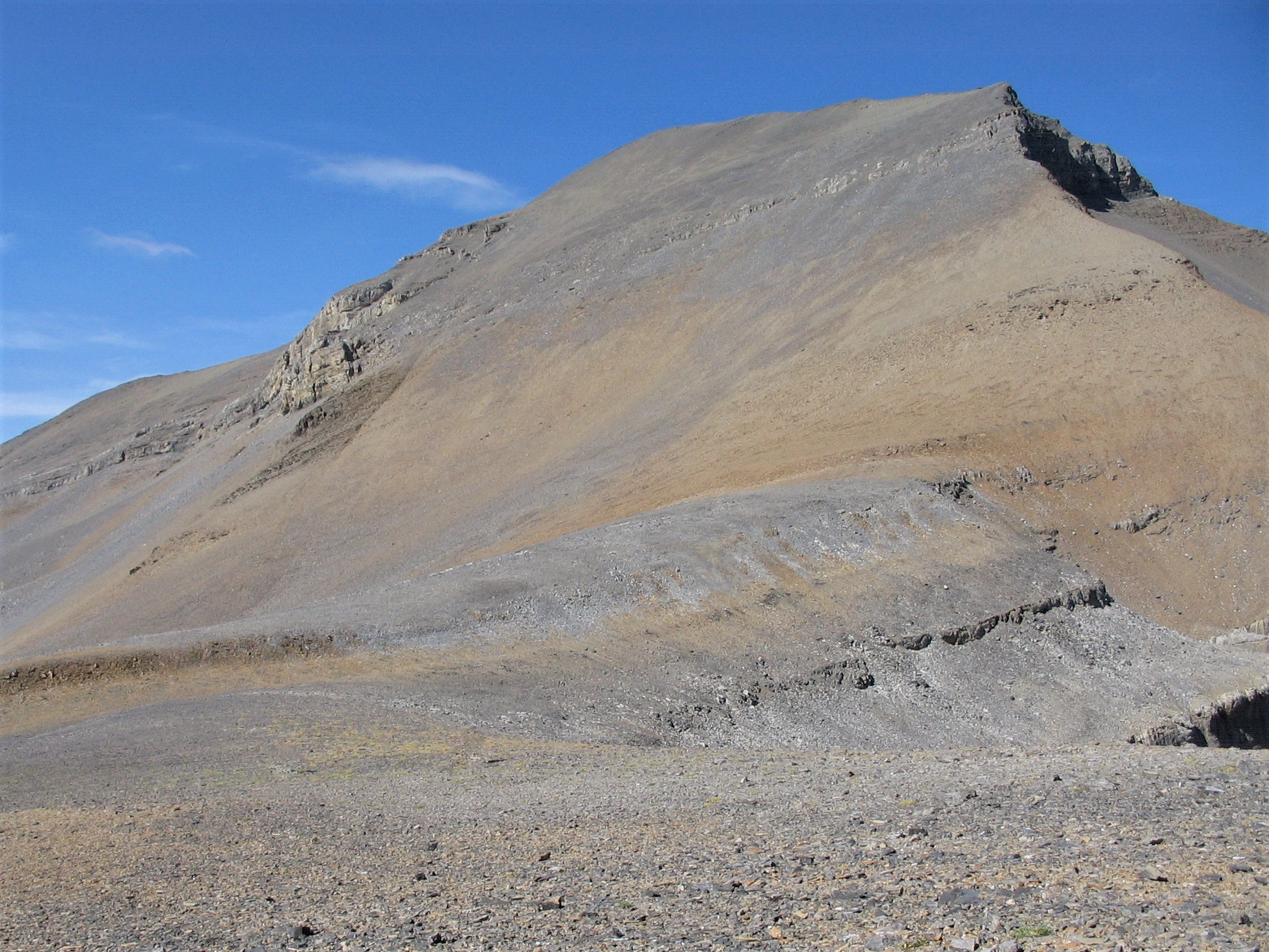
- East aspect

Highest point
- Elevation: 2,957 m (9,701 ft)
- Prominence: 183 m (600 ft)
- Parent peak: Mount Cornwall (2,970 m)
- Isolation: 2 km (1.2 mi)
- Listing: Mountains of Alberta
- Coordinates: 50°43′15″N 114°56′27″W

Geography
- Location within Alberta Location within Canada
- Country: Canada
- Province: Alberta
- Protected area: Elbow-Sheep Wildland Provincial Park; Don Getty Wildland Provincial Park
- Parent range: Opal Range; Canadian Rockies
- Topo map: NTS 82J10 Mount Rae

Geology
- Rock age: Cambrian
- Rock type: Limestone

Outlaw Peak is a 2,957-metre (9,701-foot) mountain summit located in Alberta, Canada.

== Description ==
Outlaw Peak ranks as the sixth-highest peak in the Opal Range of the Canadian Rockies. It is situated 71 km (44 mi) southwest of Calgary, within Elbow-Sheep Wildland Provincial Park of Kananaskis Country. Precipitation runoff from the mountain drains into tributaries of the Elbow River and topographic relief is modest as the summit rises 1,077 metres (3,533 ft) above the river in 3.5 km (2.2 mi). The nearest neighbor is Banded Peak 1.03 km (0.64 mi) to the east, and the nearest higher neighbor is Mount Cornwall, 2.0 km (1.2 mi) to the north. The peak is visible from Highway 66. The peak was unofficially named in 1974 by Don Forest, in association with nearby Banded Peak, which he mistakenly thought was named "Bandit" Peak.

== Geology ==
Outlaw Peak is composed of sedimentary rock laid down during the Precambrian to Jurassic periods. Formed in shallow seas, this sedimentary rock was pushed east and over the top of younger rock during the Laramide orogeny.

== Climate ==
Based on the Köppen climate classification, Outlaw Peak is located in a subarctic climate zone with cold, snowy winters, and mild summers. Winter temperatures can drop below −20 °C with wind chill factors below −30 °C. The months of June through September offer the most favorable weather for climbing this peak.

== Gallery ==
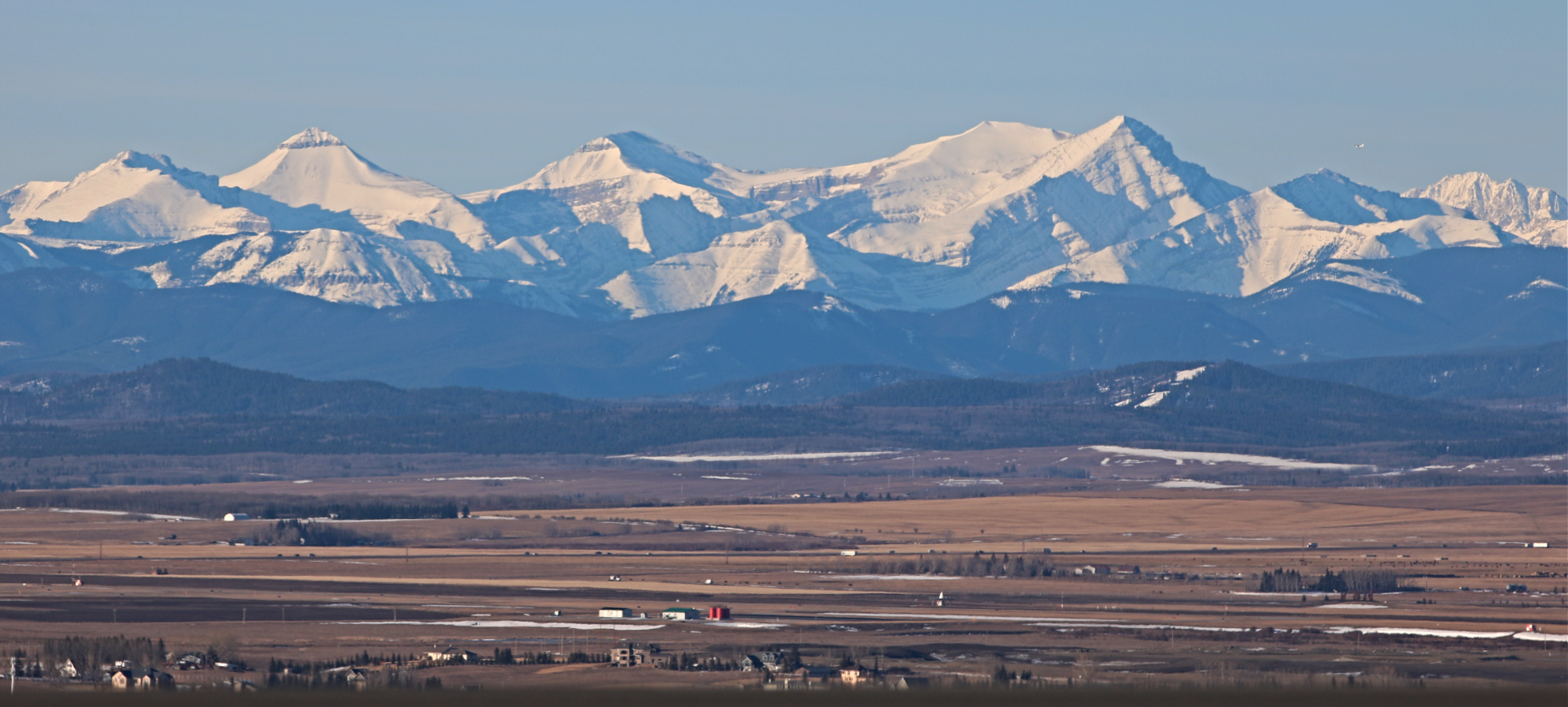
L→R Banded Peak, Outlaw Peak (left of centre), Mt. Cornwall / Mt. Glasgow

== See also ==
- Geography of Alberta
