= Mount Jerram =

Mountain in Alberta, Canada

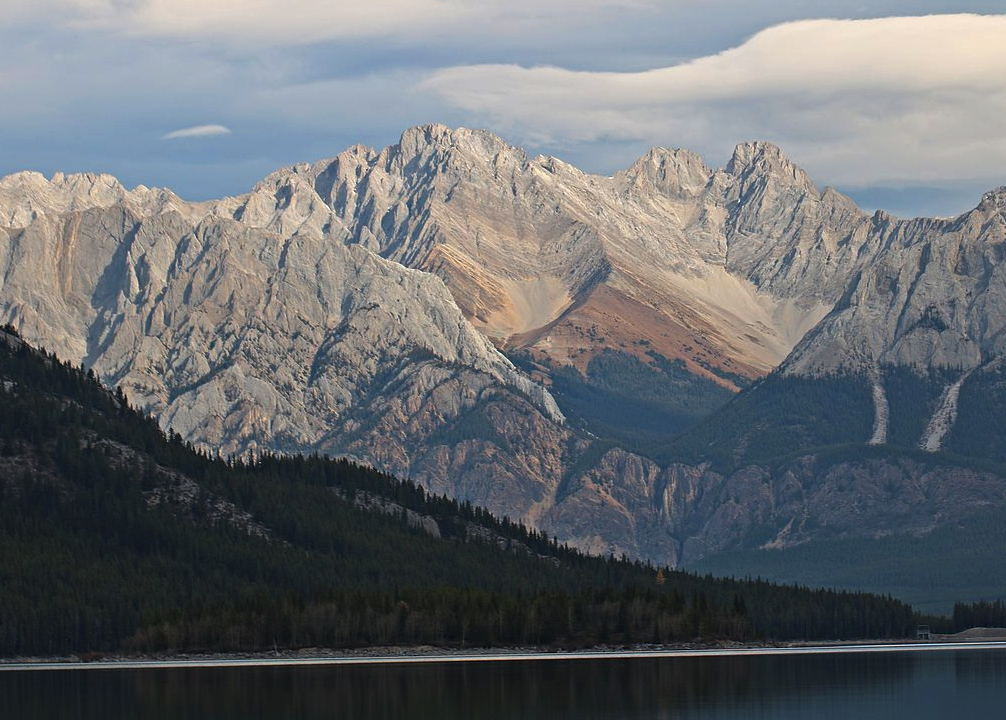
- Mount Jerram, seen from southwest at Upper Kananaskis Lake

Highest point
- Elevation: 2,996 m (9,829 ft)
- Prominence: 314 m (1,030 ft)
- Parent peak: Elpoca Mountain (3036 m)
- Coordinates: 50°42′02″N 115°02′58″W

Geography
- Location within Alberta Location within Canada
- Location: Alberta, Canada
- Parent range: Opal Range; Canadian Rockies
- Topo map: NTS 82J11 Kananaskis Lakes

Geology
- Rock age: Cambrian
- Rock type: Limestone

Climbing
- First ascent: 1957 by J.F. Tarrant and D.K. Morrison
- Easiest route: Mountaineering

Mount Jerram is a 2,996-metre (9,829-foot) mountain summit located in the Opal Range of the Canadian Rockies of Alberta, Canada. Its nearest higher peak is Elpoca Mountain, 4.0 km (2.5 mi) to the south-southeast. Mount Jerram is situated east of Mount Wintour, within Peter Lougheed Provincial Park.

Like so many of the mountains in Kananaskis Country, Mount Jerram received its name from the persons and ships involved in the 1916 Battle of Jutland, the only major sea battle of the First World War.

== History ==
The mountain was named in honor of Admiral Sir Thomas Henry Martyn Jerram (1858-1933), Royal Navy commander of the Second Battle Squadron during the Battle of Jutland in World War I.

The mountain's name was made official in 1922 by the Geographical Names Board of Canada.

The first ascent of the peak was made on June 15, 1957 by Jim Tarrant and Don Morrison.

== Geology ==
Mount Jerram is composed of sedimentary rock laid down during the Precambrian to Jurassic periods. Formed in shallow seas, this sedimentary rock was pushed east and over the top of younger rock during the Laramide orogeny. Jerram was created during the Lewis Overthrust. The steeply tilted strata are virtually the same in each peak of the Opal Range, with softer layers sandwiched between harder layers.

== Climate ==
Based on the Köppen climate classification, Mount Jerram is located in a subarctic climate with cold, snowy winters, and mild summers. Temperatures can drop below −20 °C with wind chill factors below −30 °C.

In terms of favorable weather, June through September are the best months to climb Mount Jerram.

Precipitation runoff from the west side of the mountain drains into the Kananaskis River, whereas the east side drains into tributaries of the Elbow River.

== See also ==
- List of mountains of Alberta
- List of mountains of Canada
