= Tombstone Mountain =

Mountain in Alberta, Canada

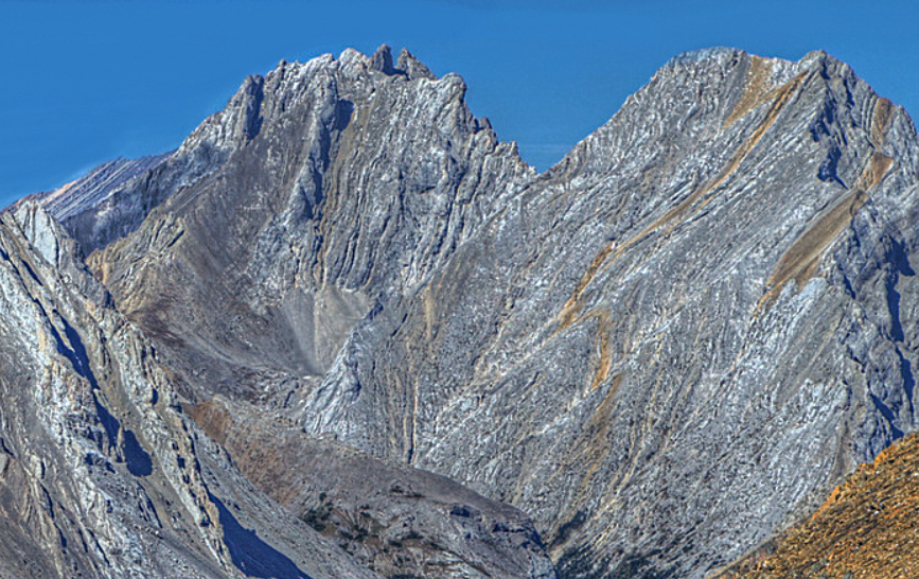
- Tombstone Mountain

Highest point
- Elevation: 3,002 m (9,849 ft)
- Prominence: 411 m (1,348 ft)
- Parent peak: Elpoca Mountain (3036 m)
- Listing: Mountains of Alberta
- Coordinates: 50°41′55″N 115°01′02″W

Geography
- Location within Alberta Location within Canada
- Country: Canada
- Province: Alberta
- Protected area: Elbow-Sheep Wildland Provincial Park
- Parent range: Opal Range; Canadian Rockies
- Topo map: NTS 82J11 Kananaskis Lakes

Geology
- Rock age: Cambrian
- Rock type: Limestone

Climbing
- Easiest route: South: Scramble

Tombstone Mountain is a 3,002-metre (9,849-foot) double summit mountain located near the southern end of the Opal Range in Kananaskis Country of the Canadian Rockies in Alberta, Canada. Tombstone South is the lower of the two summits, and is labelled as Tombstone Mountain on some maps. It can be reached via scrambling, whereas the true north summit requires technical climbing. Tombstone Mountain is situated within Elbow-Sheep Wildland Provincial Park, and its nearest higher peak is Elpoca Mountain, 4.0 km (2.5 mi) to the south.

== History ==
The mountain was named by Canadian surveyor George Mercer Dawson in 1884 for the pinnacles and slabs which resembled tombstones near the summit. The mountain's name was officially adopted in 1924 by the Geographical Names Board of Canada.

== Geology ==
Tombstone Mountain is composed of sedimentary rock laid down during the Precambrian to Jurassic periods. Formed in shallow seas, this sedimentary rock was pushed east and over the top of younger rock during the Laramide orogeny. Tombstone Mountain was created during the Lewis Overthrust. The steeply tilted strata are virtually the same in each peak of the Opal Range, with softer layers sandwiched between harder layers.

== Climate ==
Based on the Köppen climate classification, Tombstone Mountain is located in a subarctic climate zone with cold, snowy winters, and mild summers. Temperatures can drop below −20 °C with wind chill factors below −30 °C. In terms of favorable weather, July through September are the best months to climb Tombstone Mountain. Precipitation runoff from the mountain drains into tributaries of the Elbow River.

== Gallery ==
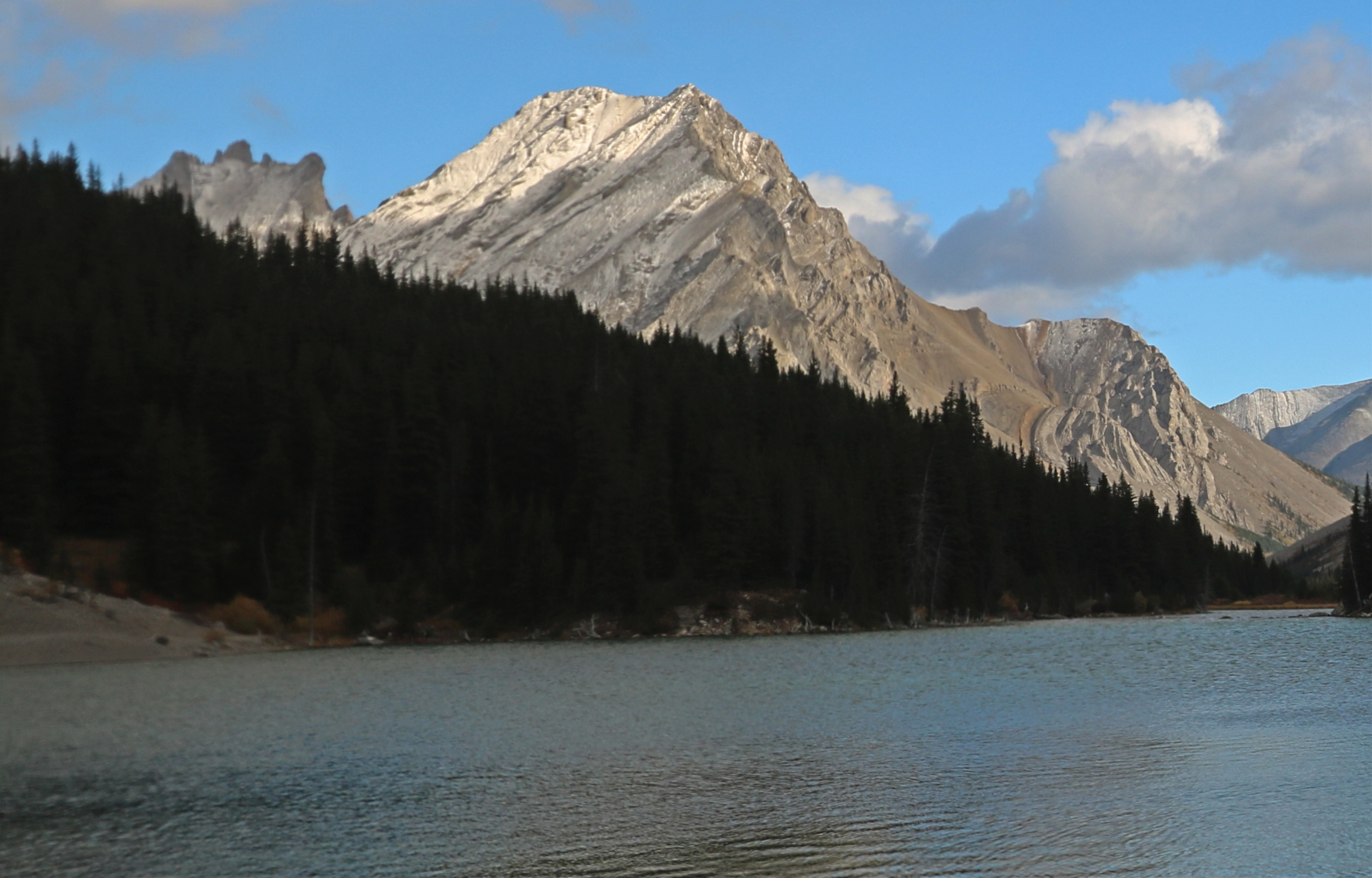
Tombstone South seen from Elbow Lake

== See also ==
- Geography of Alberta
