= Devils Head (Canada) =

- Location within Alberta Location within Canada

Highest point
- Elevation: 2,997 m (9,833 ft)
- Prominence: 780 m (2,560 ft)
- Listing: Mountains of Alberta
- Coordinates: 51°20′46″N 115°15′58″W

Geography
- Location: Alberta, Canada
- Parent range: Rocky Mountains

Devils Head is a summit in Alberta, Canada.

Devils Head's name is an accurate preservation of its Cree name, we-ti-kwos-ti-kwan.
