= Mount Cornwall =

Mountain in Alberta, Canada

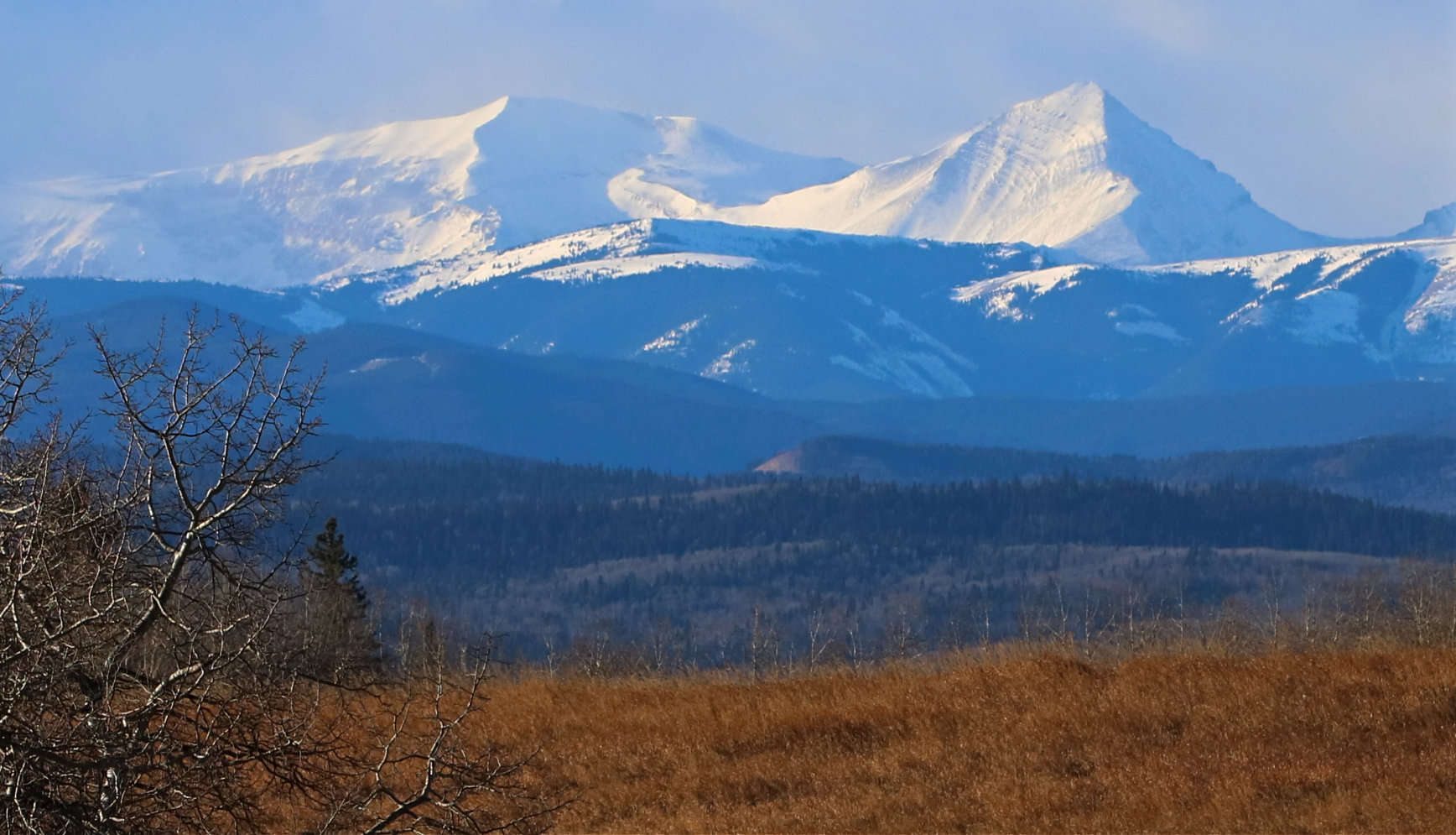
- Mount Cornwall is the gentle peak left of center. Mount Glasgow to right.

Highest point
- Elevation: 2,970 m (9,740 ft)
- Prominence: 730 m (2,400 ft)
- Parent peak: Tombstone Mountain (3002 m)
- Listing: Mountains of Alberta
- Coordinates: 50°44′18″N 114°56′50″W

Geography
- Location within Alberta Location within Canada
- Country: Canada
- Province: Alberta
- Parent range: Canadian Rockies
- Topo map: NTS 82J10 Mount Rae

Geology
- Rock age: Cambrian
- Rock type: limestone

Climbing
- First ascent: 1949, Arnold Choquette
- Easiest route: Scramble

Mount Cornwall is a prominent 2,970-metre (9,740-foot) summit located between the Elbow River valley and Little Elbow River valley of Kananaskis Country in the Canadian Rockies of Alberta, Canada. The peak is visible from Highway 66, weather permitting. Mount Cornwall's nearest higher peak is Tombstone Mountain, 6.6 km (4.1 mi) to the southwest.

== History ==
Mount Cornwall was named in 1922 for HMS Cornwall, a British warship involved in the Battle of the Falkland Islands during the First World War in the South Atlantic.

The first ascent of the peak was made in 1949 by Arnold Choquette.

The mountain's name became official in 1951 by the Geographical Names Board of Canada.

== Geology ==
Mount Cornwall is composed of sedimentary rock laid down during the Precambrian to Jurassic periods. Formed in shallow seas, this sedimentary rock was pushed east and over the top of younger rock during the Laramide orogeny.

== Climate ==
Based on the Köppen climate classification, Mount Cornwall is located in a subarctic climate with cold, snowy winters, and mild summers. Temperatures can drop below −20 °C (−4 °F) with wind chill factors below −30 °C (−22 °F). Precipitation runoff from the mountain drains into the Elbow River which is a tributary of the Bow River.

== See also ==
- Alberta's Rockies
- Geography of Alberta
