= Nigel Jerram =

English cricketer, medical doctor, and Royal Air Force officer

Personal information
- Full name: Nigel Martyn Jerram
- Born: 9 March 1900; Weymouth, Dorset, England
- Died: 19 December 1968 (aged 68); Trescoll, Cornwall, England
- Batting: Right-handed

Domestic team information
- Years: Team
- 1922–1923: Oxfordshire

Career statistics
Competition	First-class
Matches	1
Runs scored	78
Batting average	78.00
100s/50s	–/–
Top score	43*
Catches/stumpings	1/–
- Source: Cricinfo, 20 March 2019

Nigel Martyn Jerram MRCS LRCP (9 March 1900 – 19 December 1968) was an English first-class cricketer, medical doctor and Royal Air Force officer.

== Life and military career ==
The son of Admiral Sir Thomas Henry Martyn Jerram, he was born at Weymouth and was educated at Marlborough College. After leaving Marlborough, he briefly served in the Hampshire Regiment as a second lieutenant, before studying medicine at the University of Cambridge and at St Thomas' Hospital.

He played minor counties cricket for Oxfordshire in 1922 and 1923, making two appearances in the Minor Counties Championship.

After graduating, he joined the Medical Branch of the Royal Air Force as a flying officer in October 1928. He was promoted to the rank of flight lieutenant in April 1930.

He played first-class cricket for the Royal Air Force in 1930, making a single appearance against the Army at The Oval. Batting twice in the match, Jerram was dismissed for a single run in the Royal Air Force first-innings by John Walford, while in their second-innings he was dismissed for 9 runs by Frederick Arnold. He was placed on the retired list in December 1932, on account of ill health.

== Death ==
He died in December 1968 at Trescoll, Cornwall.
