= Mount Wintour =

Mountain in Alberta, Canada

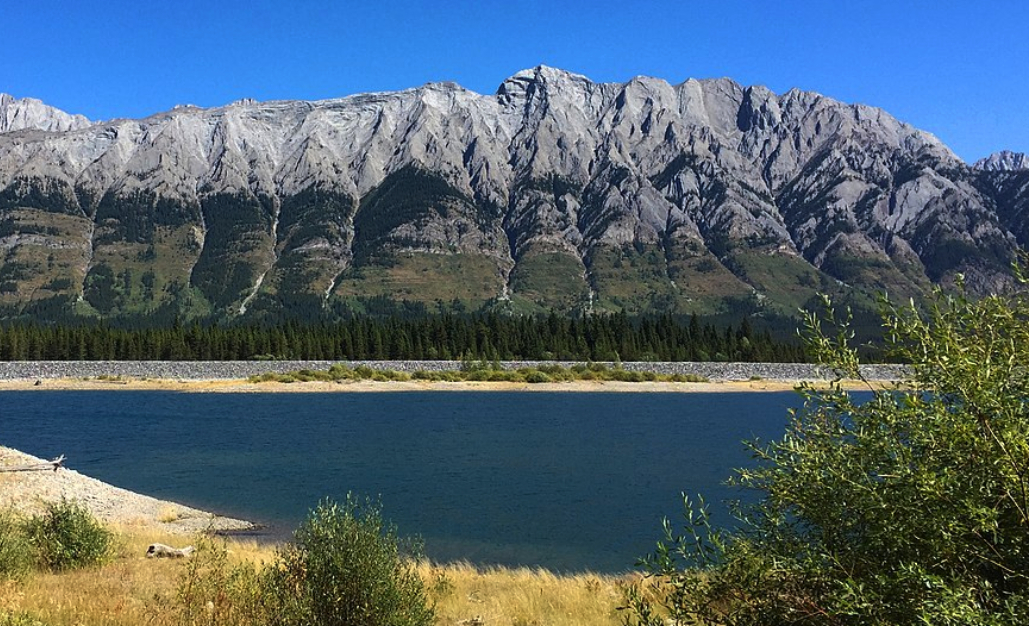
- West aspect, seen from Lower Kananaskis Lake

Highest point
- Elevation: 2,700 m (8,900 ft)
- Prominence: 368 m (1,207 ft)
- Parent peak: Mount Jerram (2996 m)
- Listing: Mountains of Alberta
- Coordinates: 50°41′42″N 115°04′50″W

Geography
- Location within Alberta Location within Canada
- Interactive map of Mount Wintour
- Location: Alberta, Canada
- Parent range: Opal Range; Canadian Rockies
- Topo map: NTS 82J11 Kananaskis Lakes

Geology
- Rock type: sedimentary rock

Climbing
- First ascent: 1968 by Glen Boles and E. Peyer
- Easiest route: Climbing YDS 5.4

Mount Wintour is a 2,700-metre (8,900-foot) ridge-like mountain summit located in the Opal Range of the Canadian Rockies of Alberta, Canada. It is situated in the Kananaskis River Valley east of Lower Kananaskis Lake and Highway 40 in Peter Lougheed Provincial Park. The nearest higher neighbor is Mount Jerram, 2.3 km (1.4 mi) to the east. The northern end of Mount Wintour forms the south canyon wall of King Creek which is a popular ice climbing destination. There are two climbing routes to the summit, the North Ridge and the South Ridge, both rated class 5.4.

== History ==
The mountain was named in honor of Captain Charles John Wintour (1871–1916), Royal Navy commander of the 4th Destroyer Flotilla. He was killed when his flagship, the destroyer HMS Tipperary was sunk by the German battleship SMS Westfalen during the Battle of Jutland in World War I. The mountain's toponym was officially adopted in 1928 by the Geographical Names Board of Canada.

The first ascent of the peak was made in August 1968 by Glen Boles and E. Peyer via the North Ridge.

== Geology ==
Mount Wintour is composed of sedimentary rock laid down during the Precambrian to Jurassic periods. Formed in shallow seas, this sedimentary rock was pushed east and over the top of younger rock during the Laramide orogeny.

== Climate ==
Based on the Köppen climate classification, Mount Wintour is located in a subarctic climate with cold, snowy winters, and mild summers. Temperatures can drop below −20 °C (−4 °F) with wind chill factors below −30 °C (−22 °F).

The months June through September offer the most favorable weather to climb Mount Wintour.

Precipitation runoff from the mountain drains into the Kananaskis River.

== Gallery ==
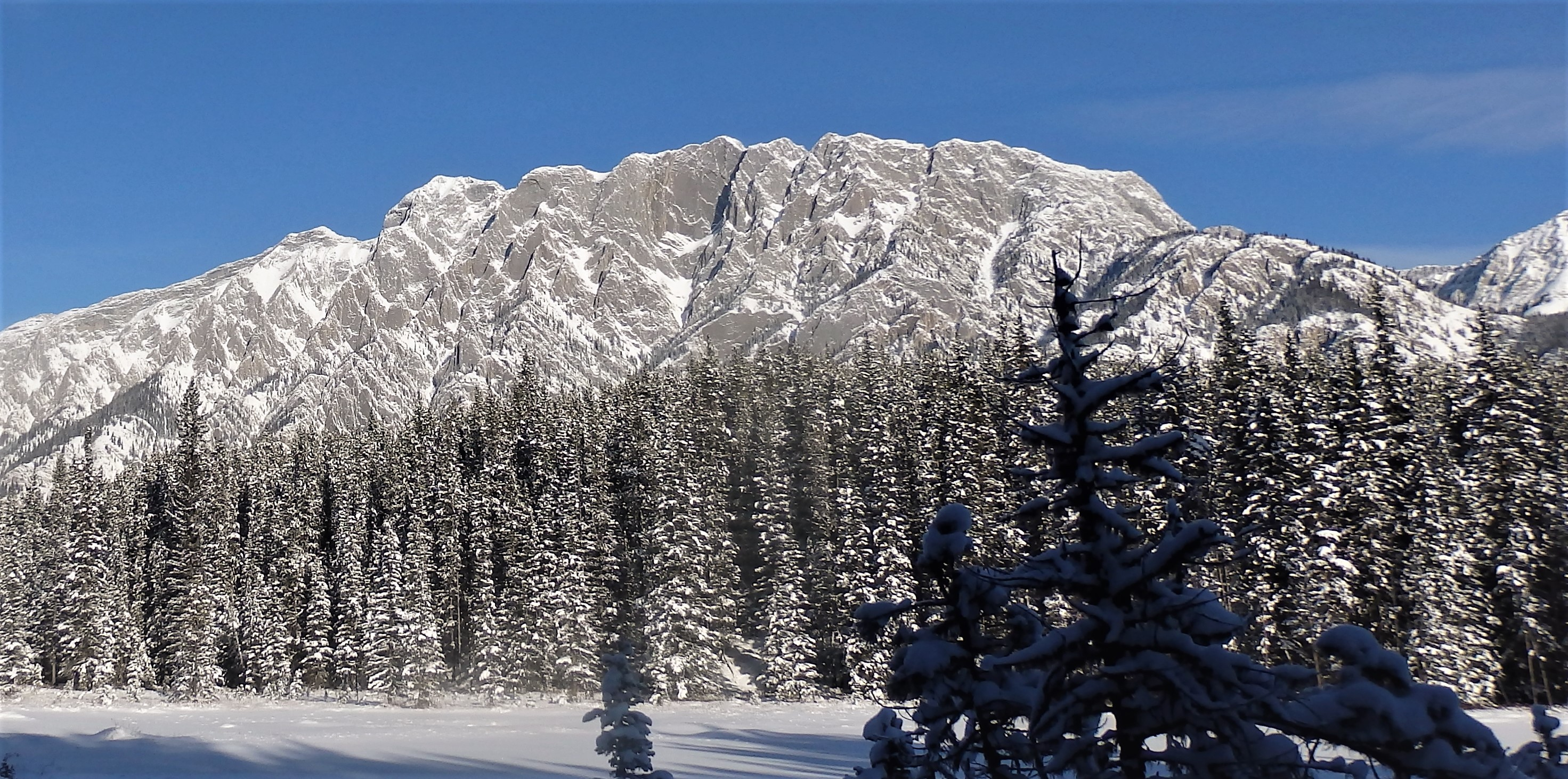
West aspect in winter

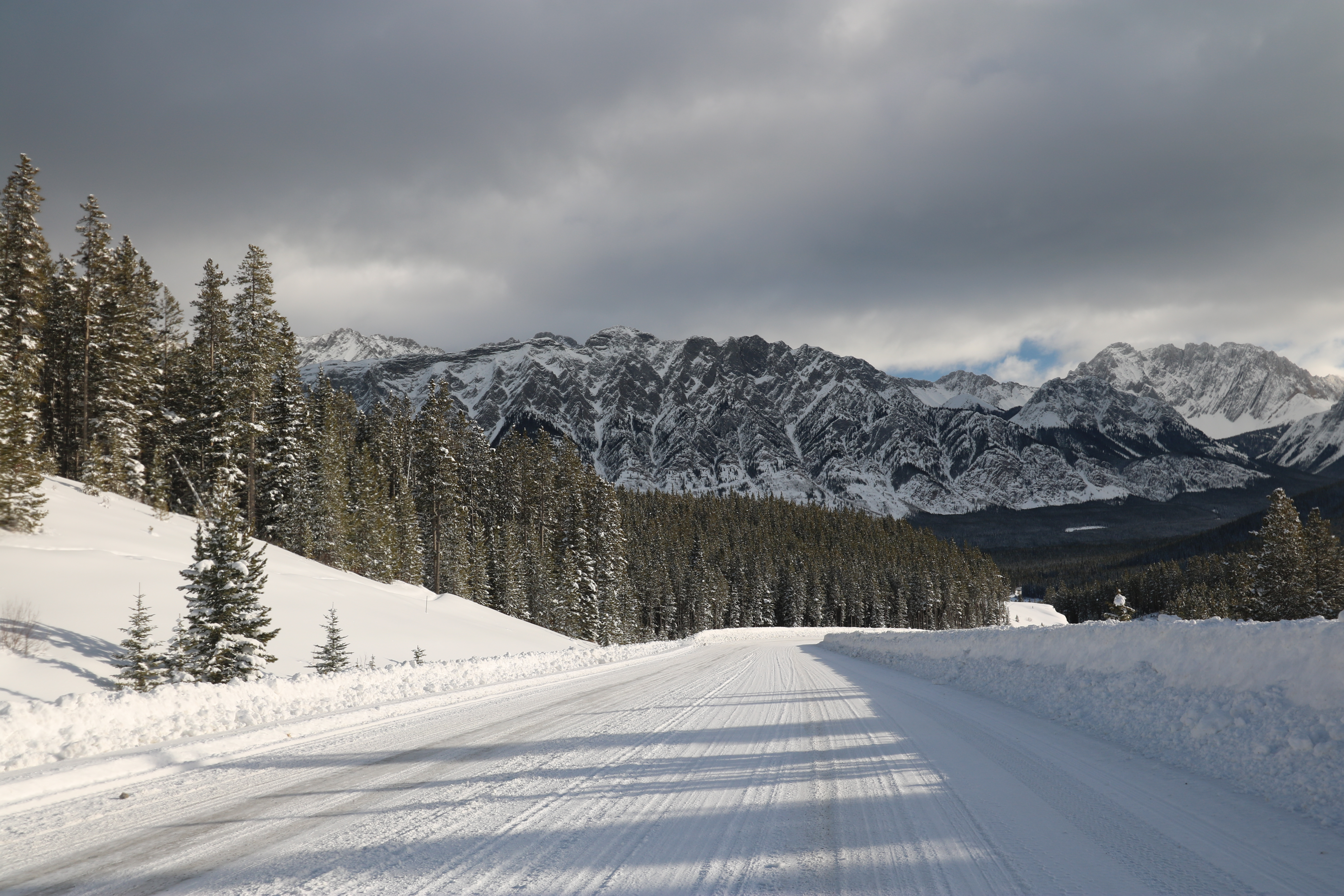
Mount Wintour in winter

== See also ==
- List of mountains of Canada
- Geography of Alberta
