= Elpoca Mountain =

Mountain in Alberta, Canada

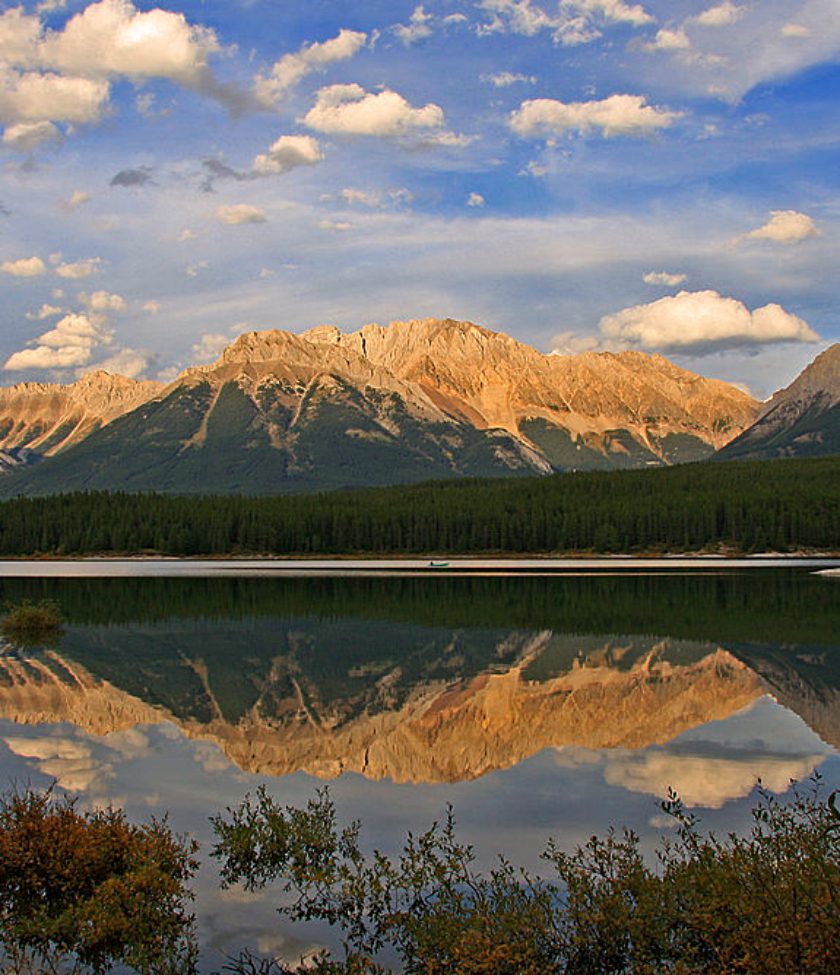
- Elpoca Mountain seen from Upper Kananaskis Lake

Highest point
- Elevation: 3,036 m (9,961 ft)
- Prominence: 460 m (1,510 ft)
- Parent peak: Mount Evan-Thomas (3097 m)
- Listing: Mountains of Alberta
- Coordinates: 50°39′53″N 115°01′37″W

Geography
- Location within Alberta Location within Canada
- Country: Canada
- Province: Alberta
- Parent range: Opal Range; Canadian Rockies
- Topo map: NTS 82J11 Kananaskis Lakes

Geology
- Rock age: Cambrian
- Rock type: Limestone

Climbing
- First ascent: 1960 by G. D. Elliot, H, Kirby, P.S. Scribens

Elpoca Mountain is a 3,036-metre (9,961-foot) mountain summit located at the southern end of the Opal Range in the Canadian Rockies of Alberta, Canada. The nearest higher peak is Mount Evan-Thomas, 12.0 km (7.5 mi) to the north. Elpoca Mountain is situated 4.0 kilometres south of Mount Jerram, and 2.0 km east of Gap Mountain, and all are within Peter Lougheed Provincial Park. Precipitation runoff from the west side of the mountain drains into tributaries of the Kananaskis River, whereas the east side drains into Elbow River.

== History ==
"Elpoca" is a portmanteau of nearby Elbow River and Pocaterra Creek.

The mountain's name was officially adopted in 1928 by the Geographical Names Board of Canada.

The first ascent of the peak was made in 1960 by G. D. Elliot, H, Kirby, and P.S. Scribens.

== Geology ==
Elpoca Mountain is composed of sedimentary rock laid down during the Precambrian to Jurassic periods. Formed in shallow seas, this sedimentary rock was pushed east and over the top of younger rock during the Laramide orogeny. Elpoca Mountain was created during the Lewis Overthrust. The steeply tilted strata are virtually the same in each peak of the Opal Range, with softer layers sandwiched between harder layers.

== Climate ==
Based on the Köppen climate classification, Elpoca Mountain is located in a subarctic climate zone with cold, snowy winters, and mild summers. Winter temperatures can drop below −20 °C with wind chill factors below −30 °C.

June through September offer the most favorable weather to climb Elpoca Mountain.

== See also ==
- Geology of the Rocky Mountains
- List of mountains in the Canadian Rockies

== Gallery ==
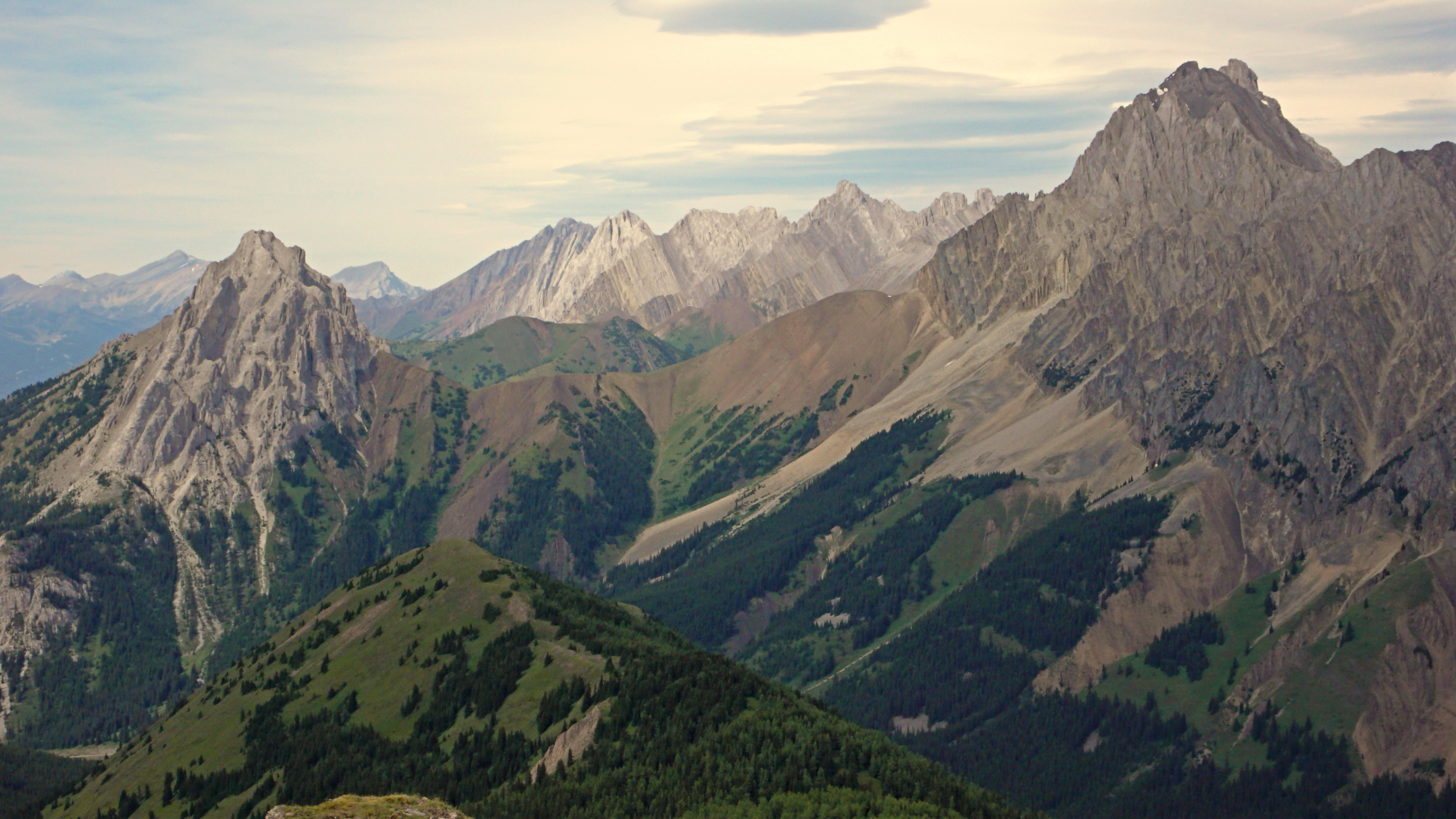
Elpoca Mountain (right) and Gap Mountain (left)

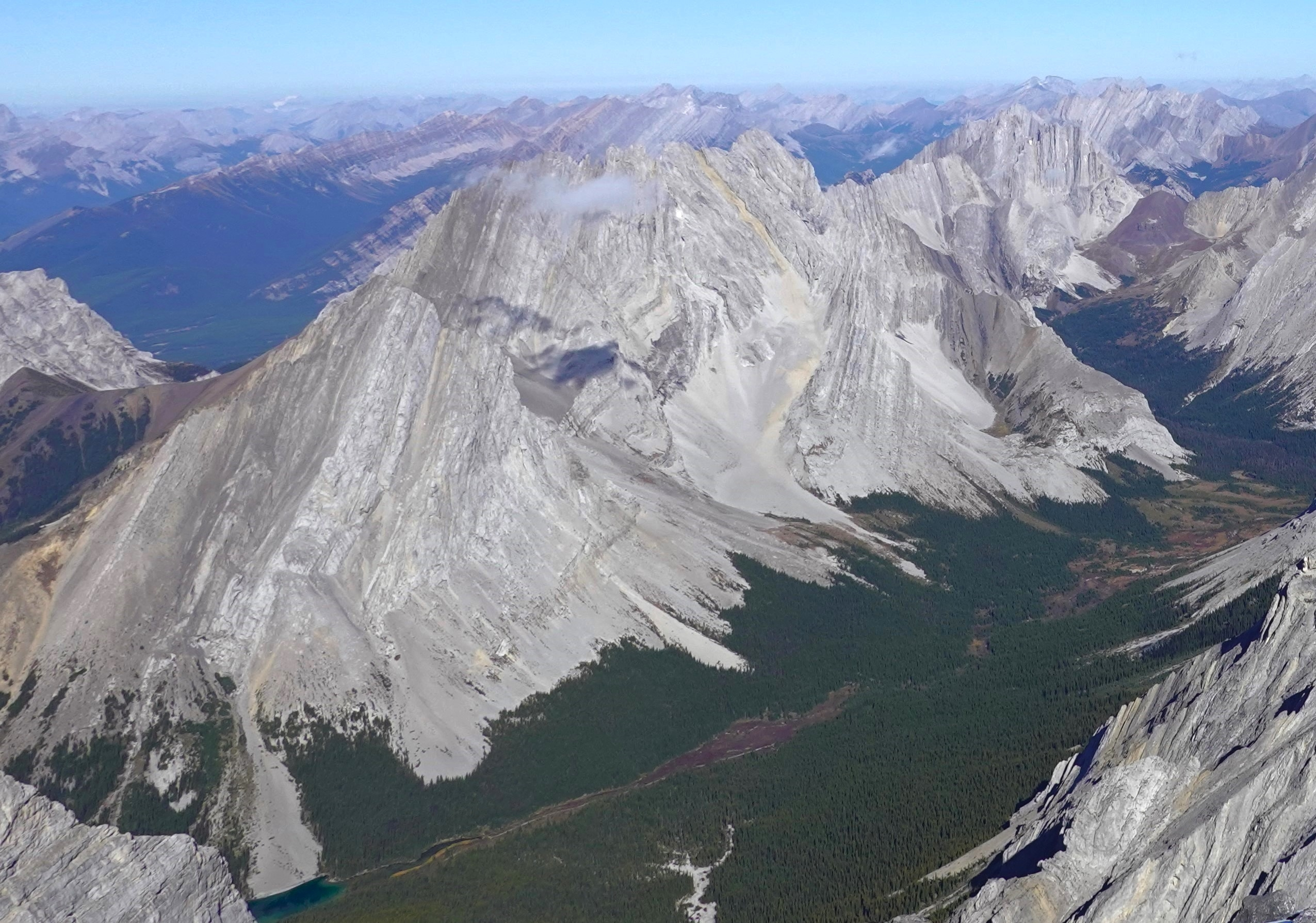
South aspect of Elpoca Mountain viewed from Mt. Rae
