= Threepoint Mountain =

Mountain in the country of Canada

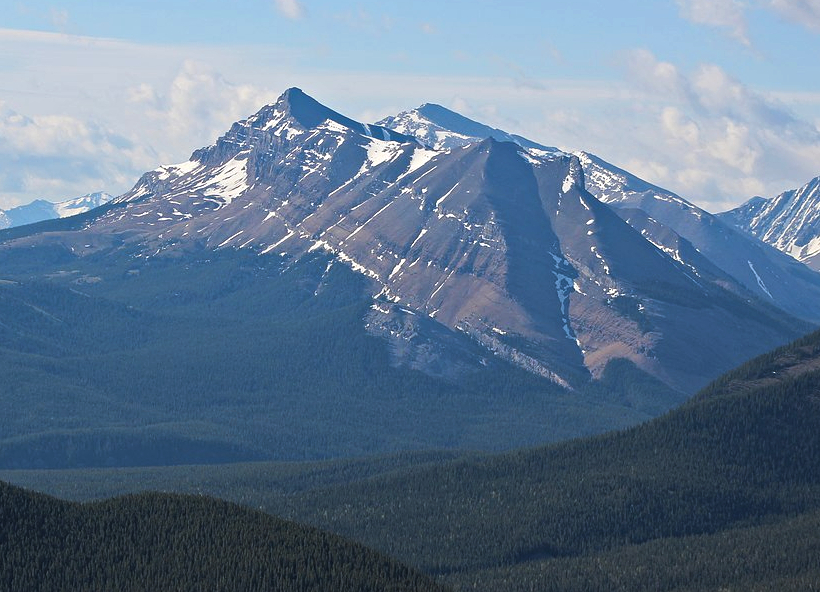
- Threepoint Mountain seen from Nihahi Ridge

Highest point
- Elevation: 2,595 m (8,514 ft)
- Prominence: 431 m (1,414 ft)
- Parent peak: Bluerock Mountain (2789 m)
- Listing: Mountains of Alberta
- Coordinates: 50°42′23″N 114°49′36″W

Geography
- Location within Alberta Location within Canada
- Country: Canada
- Province: Alberta
- Parent range: Canadian Rockies
- Topo map: NTS 82J10 Mount Rae

Geology
- Rock age: Cambrian
- Rock type: Sedimentary rock

Climbing
- Easiest route: Scramble

Threepoint Mountain is the descriptive name for a three-pointed 2,595-metre (8,514-foot) mountain summit located in the Elbow River valley of Kananaskis Country, in the Canadian Rockies of Alberta, Canada. it is situated southwest of Calgary and can be seen from Highway 66. Threepoint Mountain's nearest higher peak is Bluerock Mountain, 4.7 km (2.9 mi) to the south. The mountain's name was made official in 1951 by the Geographical Names Board of Canada.

== Geology ==
Threepoint Mountain is composed of sedimentary rock laid down during the Precambrian to Jurassic periods and was later pushed east and over the top of younger rock during the Laramide orogeny.

== Climate ==
Based on the Köppen climate classification, Threepoint Mountain is located in a subarctic climate zone with cold, snowy winters, and mild summers. Temperatures can drop below −20 °C with wind chill factors below −30 °C. In terms of favorable weather, June through October are the best months to climb. Precipitation runoff from the mountain drains into tributaries of the Elbow River.

== Gallery ==
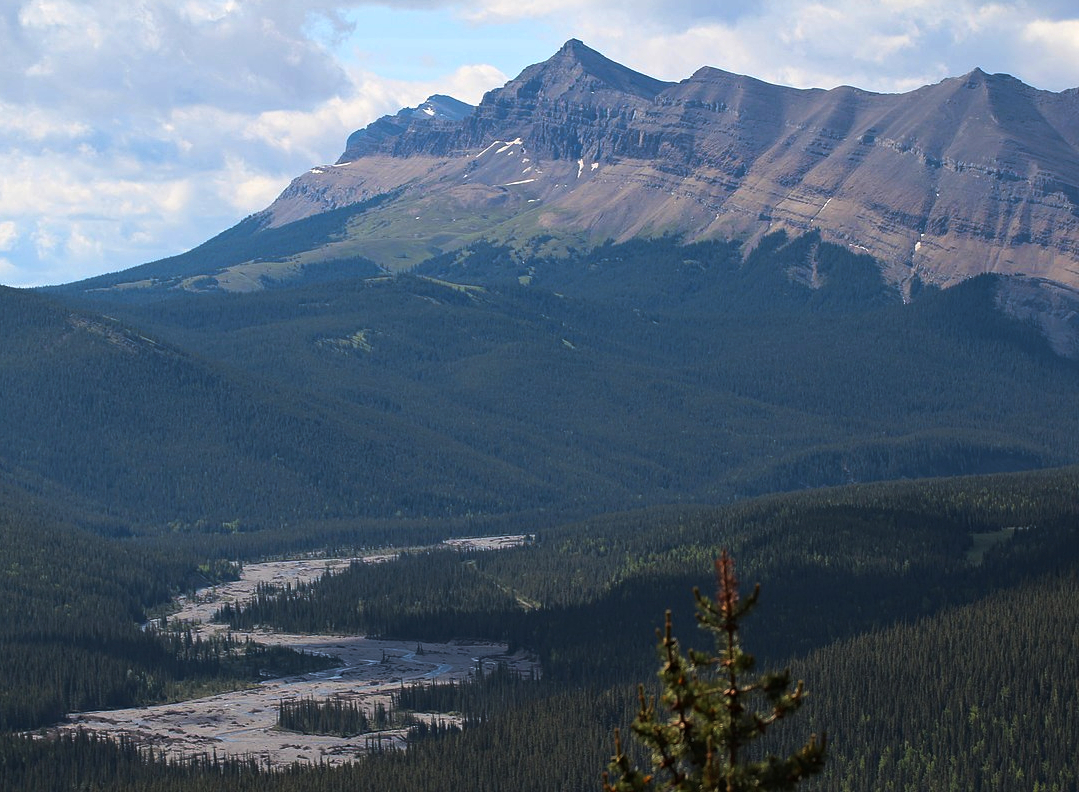
Threepoint Mountain seen from Ford Knoll

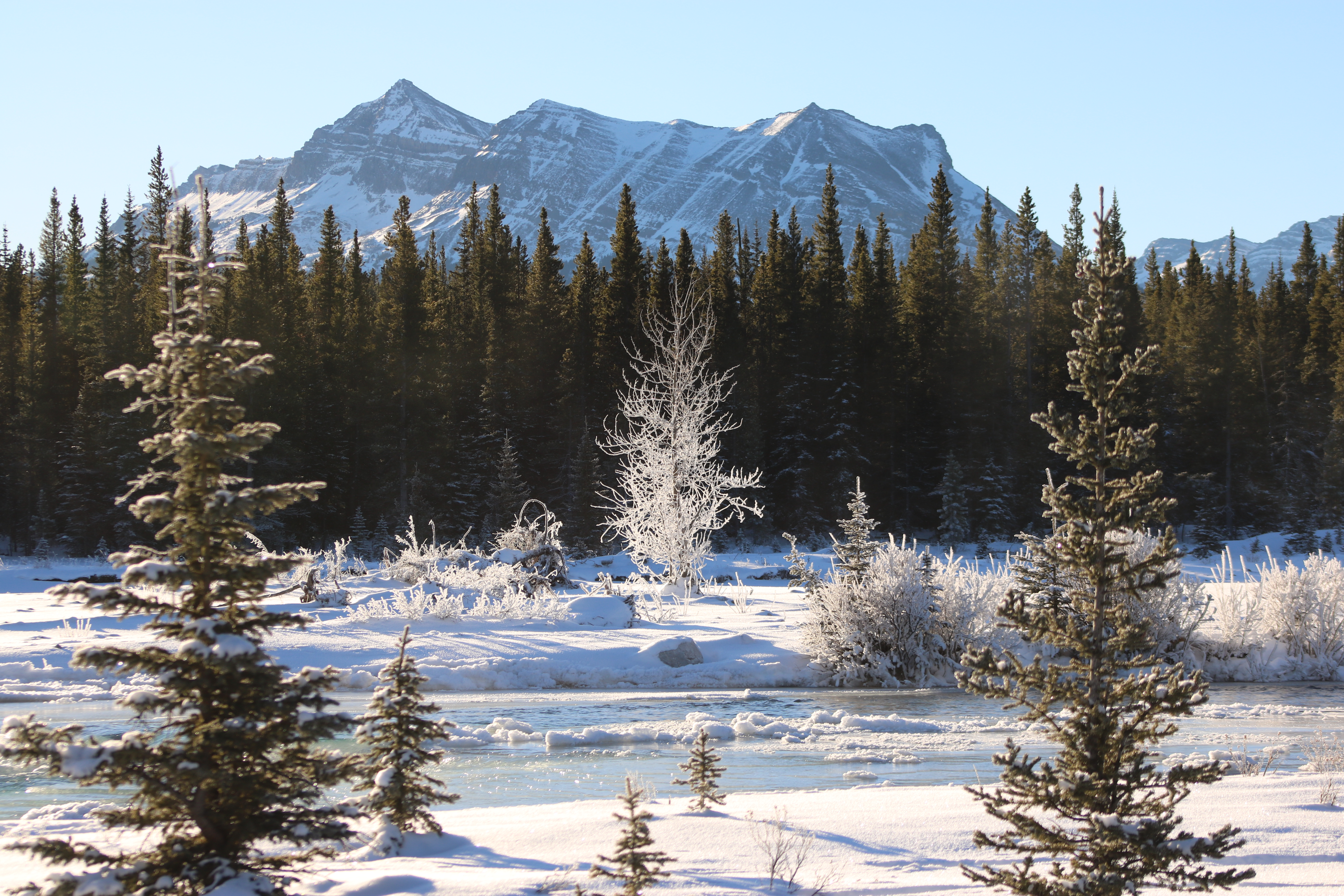
Threepoint winter scene

== See also ==
- Geography of Alberta
