= Martyn Jerram =

Royal Navy Admiral (1858-1933)

Admiral Sir Martyn Jerram GCMG KCB
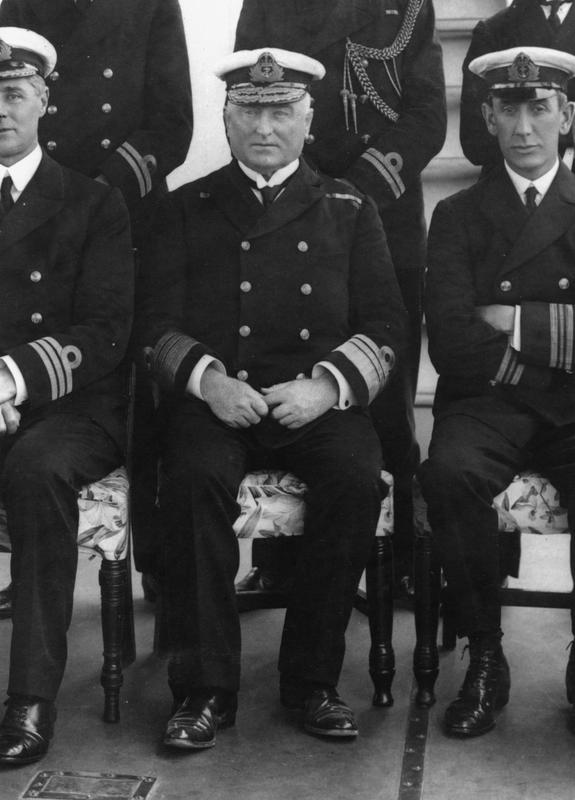
- As Commander-in-Chief, China Station, on board HMS Alacrity in 1914
- Born: 6 September 1858; Chobham, Surrey
- Died: 19 March 1933 (aged 74); Alverstoke, Hampshire
- Military career
- Allegiance: United Kingdom
- Branch: Royal Navy
- Service years: 1871–1917
- Rank: Admiral
- Commands: HMS Northampton; HMS Curacoa; HMS Albion; HMS Russell; China Station
- Conflicts: World War I
- Awards: Knight Grand Cross of the Order of St Michael and St George; Knight Commander of the Order of the Bath

Admiral Sir Thomas Henry Martyn Jerram, GCMG, KCB (6 September 1858 – 19 March 1933) was a Royal Navy officer who went on to be Commander-in-Chief, China Station.

== Naval career ==
Jerram was educated at Woodcote House School. He joined the Royal Navy in 1871. He commanded a Battalion of the Naval Brigade on an expedition to Kenya in 1890. He was then Acting Vice Consul at Beira and Mpanda in Portuguese East Africa during the unrest in 1891. He went on to command the ships HMS Northampton and HMS Curacoa. From September 1899 to March 1902 he was in command of the training ship HMS Boscawen, stationed at Portland Harbour. In March 1902 he was appointed flag captain of HMS Albion, second flagship on the China Station. He later commanded HMS Russell.

He joined the staff of the Commander of the 3rd Division of the Home Fleet in 1909 and commanded the White Fleet on manoeuvres later that year. The following year he took command of the 4th Division Battleships and then became Second-in-Command of the Mediterranean Fleet.

He served in World War I as Commander-in-Chief, China Station from 1913 to 1915, where he was involved in the 1915 Singapore mutiny before being made Commander of the 2nd Battle Squadron in which capacity he took part in the Battle of Jutland in 1916. Admiral Lord Beatty was subsequently critical of Jerram's role complaining that Jerram failed to support him as darkness fell. He retired in 1917.

Jerram was appointed a Companion of the Order of the Bath (CB) in 1912, and a Knight Commander of that Order (KCB) in the 1914 New Year Honours. He was appointed a Knight Commander of the Order of St Michael and St George (KCMG) in 1916, and a Knight Grand Cross of that Order (GCMG) in the 1919 Birthday Honours for services rendered in connection with the War.

Jerram was awarded the Grand Cordon of the Order of the Rising Sun by the Emperor of Japan in 1916, the Order of Saint Anne First Class with Swords by the Russian Government in 1917 for distinguished service in the Battle of Jutland, and appointed a Grand Officer of the Order of Saints Maurice and Lazarus by the King of Italy in 1917.

== Family ==
In 1892 he married Clara Isabel Parsons, but had remarried Ann J before 1901, when he lived at Portland. He had two sons:

- Roy Martyn Jerram, b. 1895
- Nigel Martyn Jerram, b. at Weymouth 9 March 1900

== Legacy ==
- Mount Jerram in the Canadian Rockies was named for him in 1922.

Military offices
Preceded by Sir Alfred Winsloe	Commander-in-Chief, China Station; 1913–1915	Succeeded by Sir William Grant
