= End Mountain =

Summit in Alberta, Canada

Coordinates: 51.1993°N 115.12942°W

End Mountain is a summit in Alberta, Canada.

End Mountain was so named on account of its end position on a range.
