= Banded Peak (Alberta) =

Mountain in Alberta, Canada

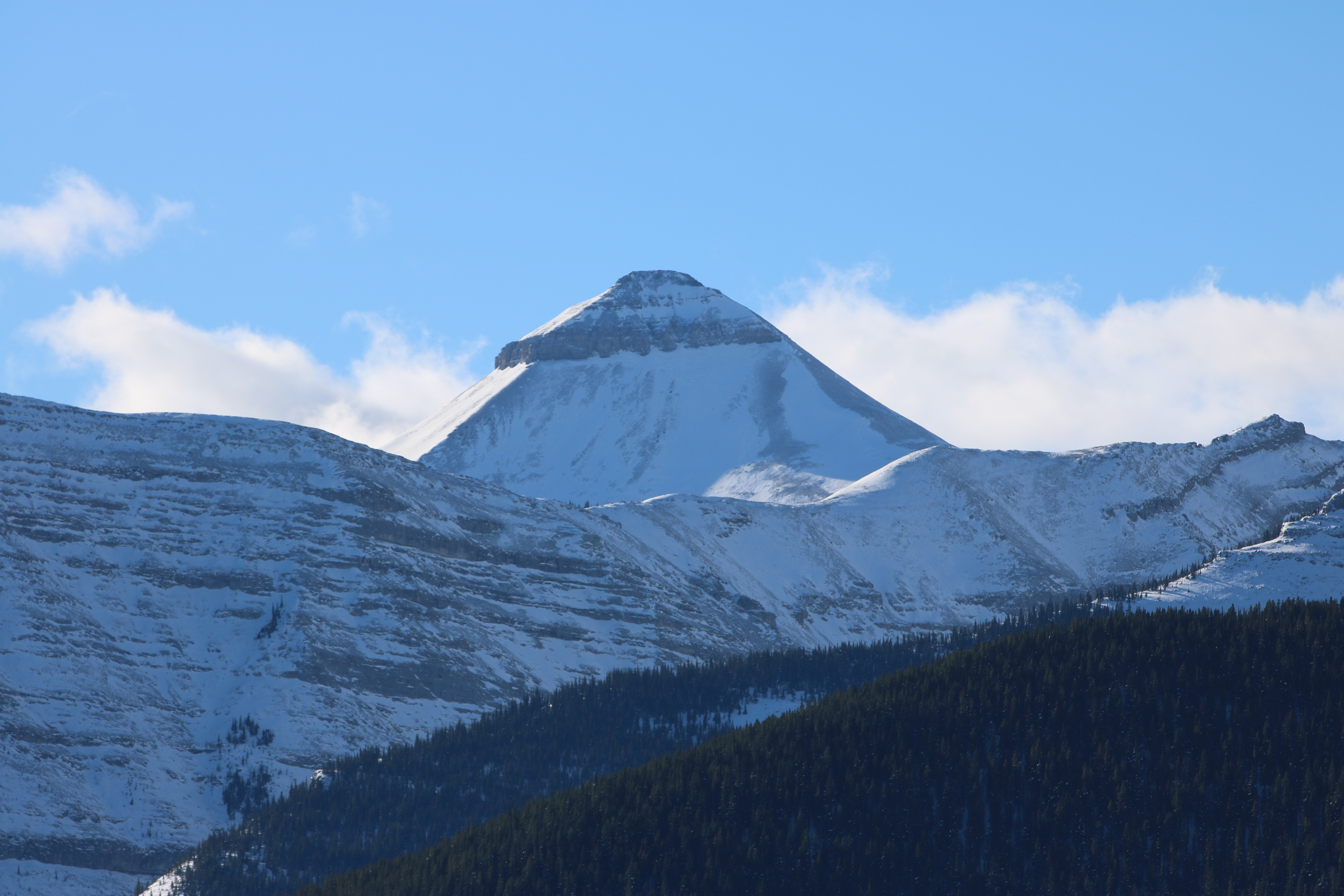
- Banded Peak

Highest point
- Elevation: 2,934 m (9,626 ft)
- Prominence: 282 m (925 ft)
- Parent peak: Outlaw Peak (2957 m)
- Coordinates: 50°43′06″N 114°55′05″W

Geography
- Location within Alberta Location within Canada
- Location: Alberta, Canada
- Parent range: Kananaskis Range; Canadian Rockies
- Topo map: NTS 82J10 Mount Rae

Geology
- Rock age: Cambrian
- Rock type(s): limestone, shale

Climbing
- Easiest route: Scrambling

Banded Peak is a 2,934-metre (9,626-foot) summit located in the Elbow River valley of Kananaskis Country in the Canadian Rockies of Alberta, Canada. Banded Peak has a distinctive limestone cliff band which gave it its descriptive name. Its name has been used since around 1896. The peak is visible from Highway 66, weather permitting. The mountain's name became official in 1951 by the Geographical Names Board of Canada.

== Geology ==
Banded Peak is composed of sedimentary rock laid down during the Precambrian to Jurassic periods. Formed in shallow seas, this sedimentary rock was pushed east and over the top of younger rock during the Laramide orogeny.

== Climate ==
Based on the Köppen climate classification, Banded Peak is located in a subarctic climate with cold, snowy winters, and mild summers. Temperatures can drop below −20 C with wind chill factors below −30 C. Precipitation runoff from the mountain drains into the Elbow River which is a tributary of the Bow River.

== Gallery ==
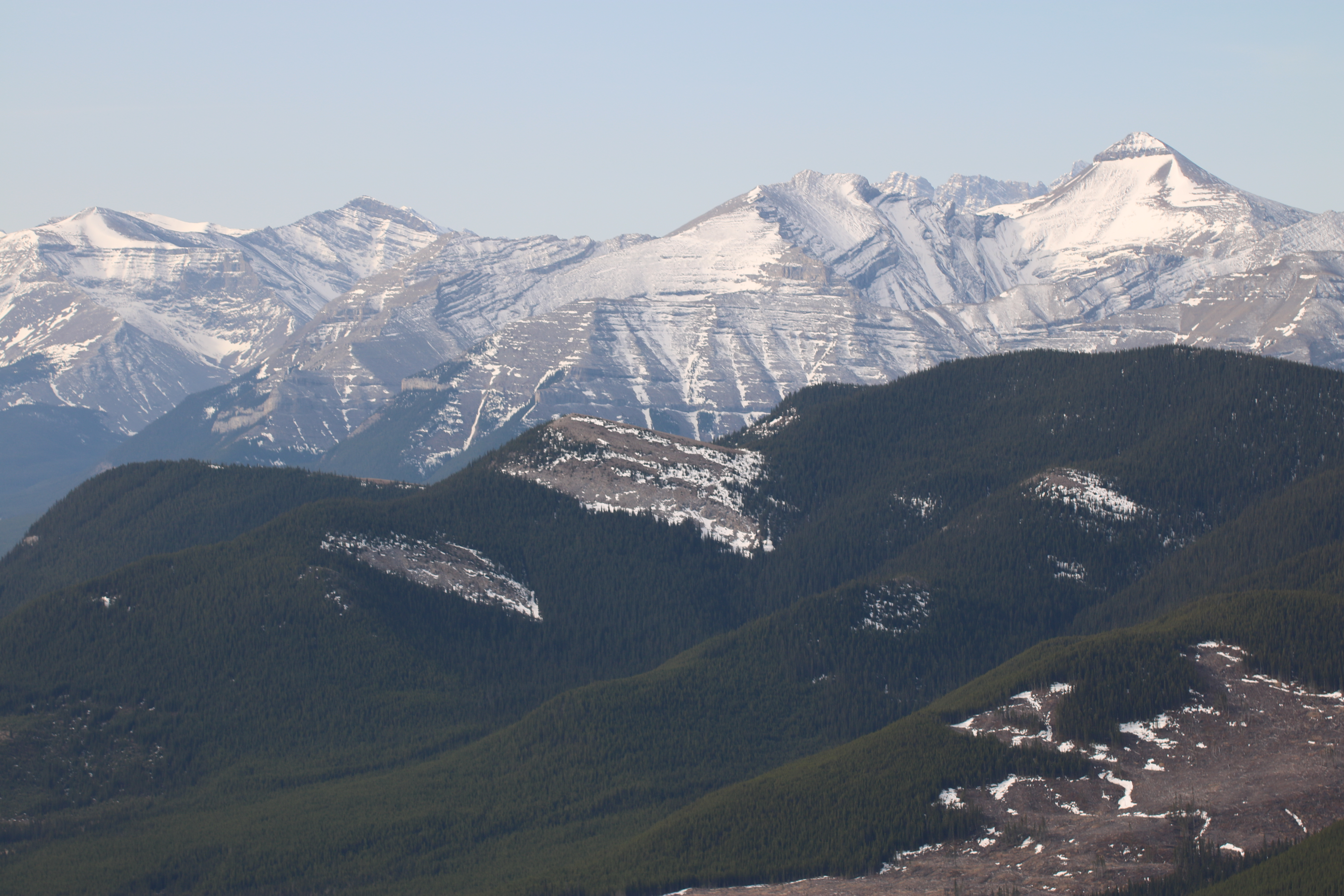
Banded Peak in upper right corner

== See also ==
- List of mountains of Canada
