= Mount Fifi =

Mountain in Banff NP, Alberta, Canada

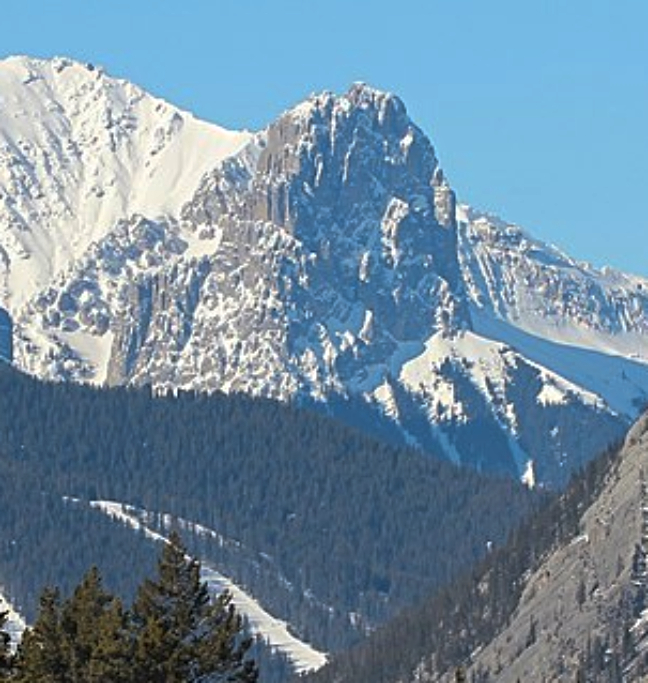
- Mount Fifi seen from Johnson Lake

Highest point
- Elevation: 2,621 m (8,599 ft)
- Prominence: 106 m (348 ft) (Note: Bivouac and cdnrockiesdatabases differ as to summit elevation by 16 m. Thus, 16 was subtracted from the prominence of 122 given by Bivouac.)
- Listing: Mountains of Alberta
- Coordinates: 51°13′19″N 115°41′26″W

Geography
- Location within Alberta Location within Canada
- Country: Canada
- Province: Alberta
- Parent range: Sawback Range; Canadian Rockies
- Topo map: NTS 82O4 Banff

Climbing
- First ascent: 1921 L.S. Crosby, J.W.A. Hickson, Edward Feuz Jr.

Mount Fifi is located in the Sawback Range of Banff National Park, Alberta. It was named in 1886 after Edith Orde's dog Fifi. Mount Louis, Mount Edith, and Mount Fifi were named on the trip.

== Geology ==
Mount Fifi is composed of limestone, a sedimentary rock laid down from the Precambrian to Jurassic periods. Formed in shallow seas, this sedimentary rock was pushed east and over the top of younger rock during the Laramide orogeny.

== Climate ==
Based on the Köppen climate classification, Mount Fifi is located in a subarctic climate with cold, snowy winters, and mild summers. Temperatures can drop below −20 °C (−4 °F) with wind chill factors below −30 °C (−22 °F). Weather conditions during summer months are optimum for climbing.

== Gallery ==
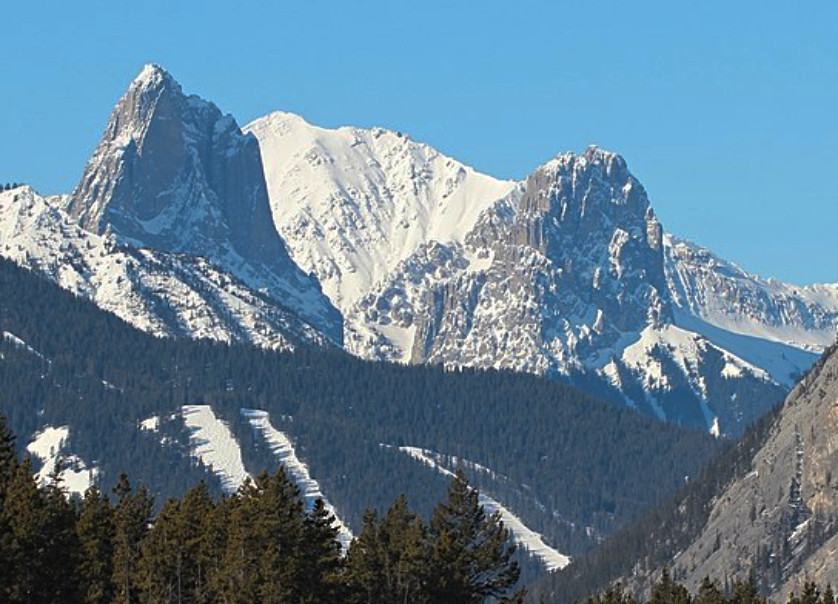
Mount Louis (left) and Mount Fifi (right)

== See also ==
- List of mountains of Canada
- Geology of Alberta
