= Bonnet Peak =

Mountain in Alberta, Canada

- Location within Alberta

Highest point
- Elevation: 3,235 m (10,614 ft)
- Prominence: 395 m (1,296 ft)
- Parent peak: Mount St. Bride (3315 m)
- Listing: Mountains of Alberta
- Coordinates: 51°26′06″N 115°53′12″W

Geography
- Country: Canada
- Province: Alberta
- Protected area: Banff National Park
- Parent range: Sawback Range
- Topo map: NTS 82O5 Castle Mountain

Climbing
- First ascent: 1914 Topographical Survey

Bonnet Peak is a massif consisting of three separate peaks: Centre (3235m), SE (3215m) and NE (3094m). It is near the source of Johnston Creek although its southern and eastern slopes drain into the Cascade River. Named in 1890 due to its appearance with a cap of snow. It is located in the Sawback Range of Alberta.
