= Mount Ishbel =

Mountain in Alberta, Canada

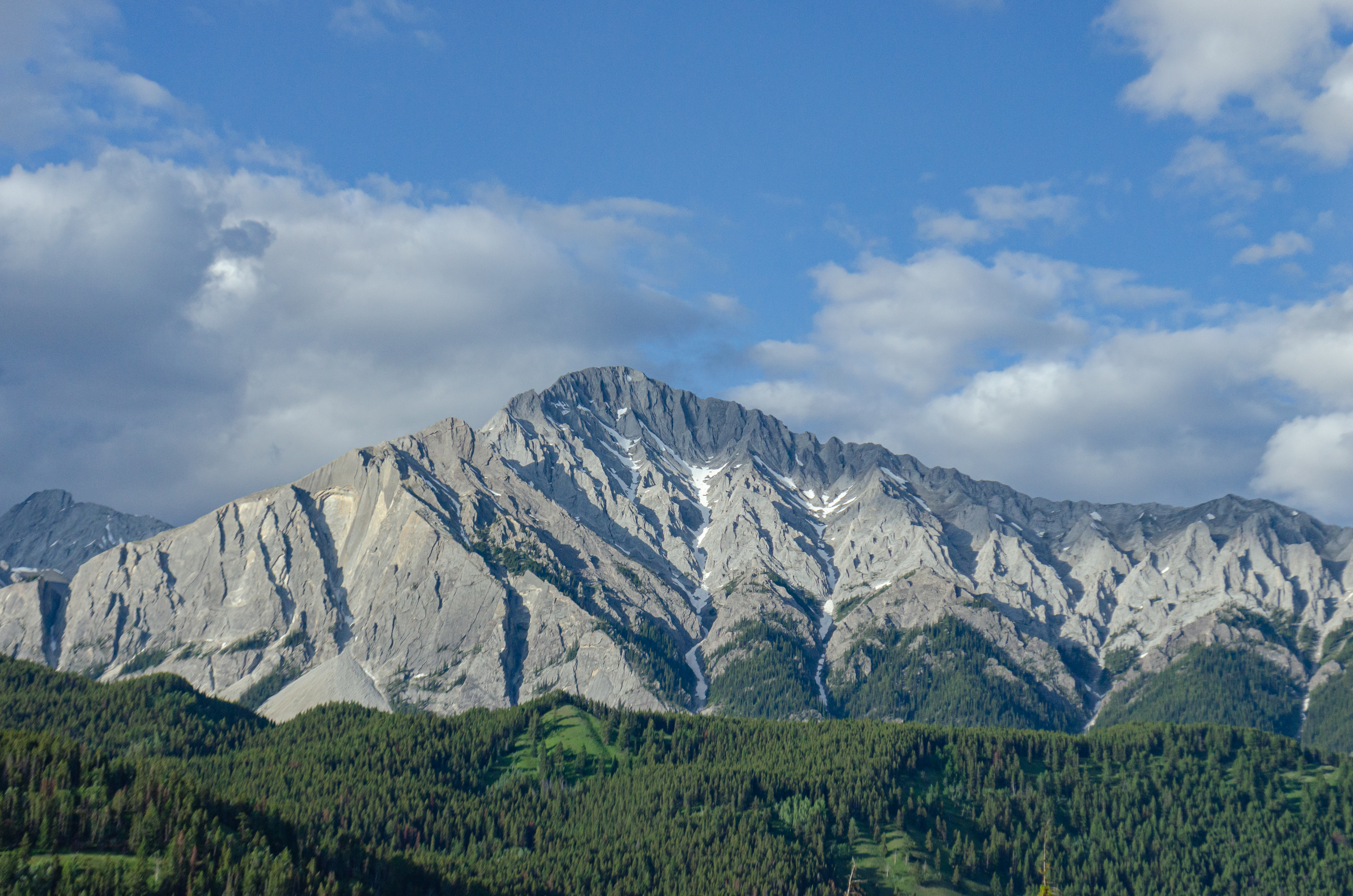
- Mount Ishbel

Highest point
- Elevation: 2,908 m (9,541 ft)
- Prominence: 431 m (1,414 ft)
- Parent peak: Mystic Peak (2,960 m)
- Listing: Mountains of Alberta
- Coordinates: 51°15′56″N 115°46′31″W

Geography
- Location within Alberta Location within Canada
- Country: Canada
- Province: Alberta
- Protected area: Banff National Park
- Parent range: Sawback Range; Canadian Rockies
- Topo map: NTS 82O5 Castle Mountain

Climbing
- First ascent: 1933 J. Packer, D. Day, V. Waters, J. Farish, W. Innes, L. DeCouteur, J. Sterlling, guided by Lawrence Grassi

Mount Ishbel is a mountain peak in Banff National Park of Alberta, Canada. The peak is located in the Sawback Range in Alberta's Rockies, north of the Bow Valley Parkway and east of Johnston Canyon.

It was named in 1956 after Ishbel MacDonald, the eldest daughter of Prime Minister Ramsay MacDonald of Great Britain. It gives the name to the Ishbel Group, a stratigraphical unit of the Western Canadian Sedimentary Basin. The peak is the subject of Group of Seven member Lawren Harris's painting Mountain Forms.

== Climate ==
Based on the Köppen climate classification, Mount Ishbel is located in a subarctic climate zone with cold, snowy winters, and mild summers. Temperatures can drop below −20 °C with wind chill factors below −30 °C.

== Geology ==
Like other mountains in Banff Park, the mountain is composed of sedimentary rock laid down from the Precambrian to Jurassic periods. Formed in shallow seas, this sedimentary rock was pushed east and over the top of younger rock during the Laramide orogeny.

== Gallery ==
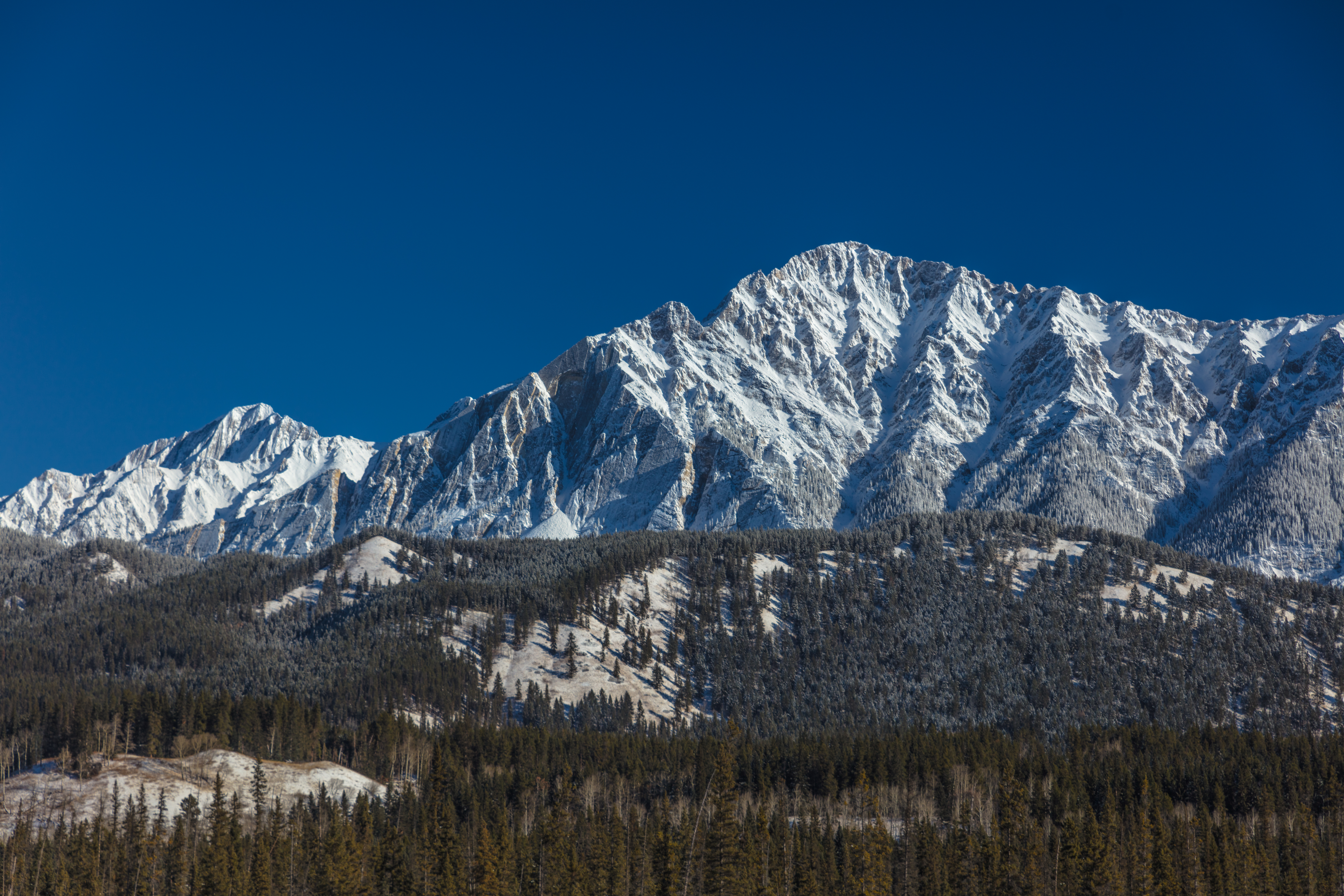
Mount Ishbel

== See also ==
- Geology of the Rocky Mountains
- Geography of Alberta
