= Cory Pass Loop =

Trail in Banff National Park in Canada

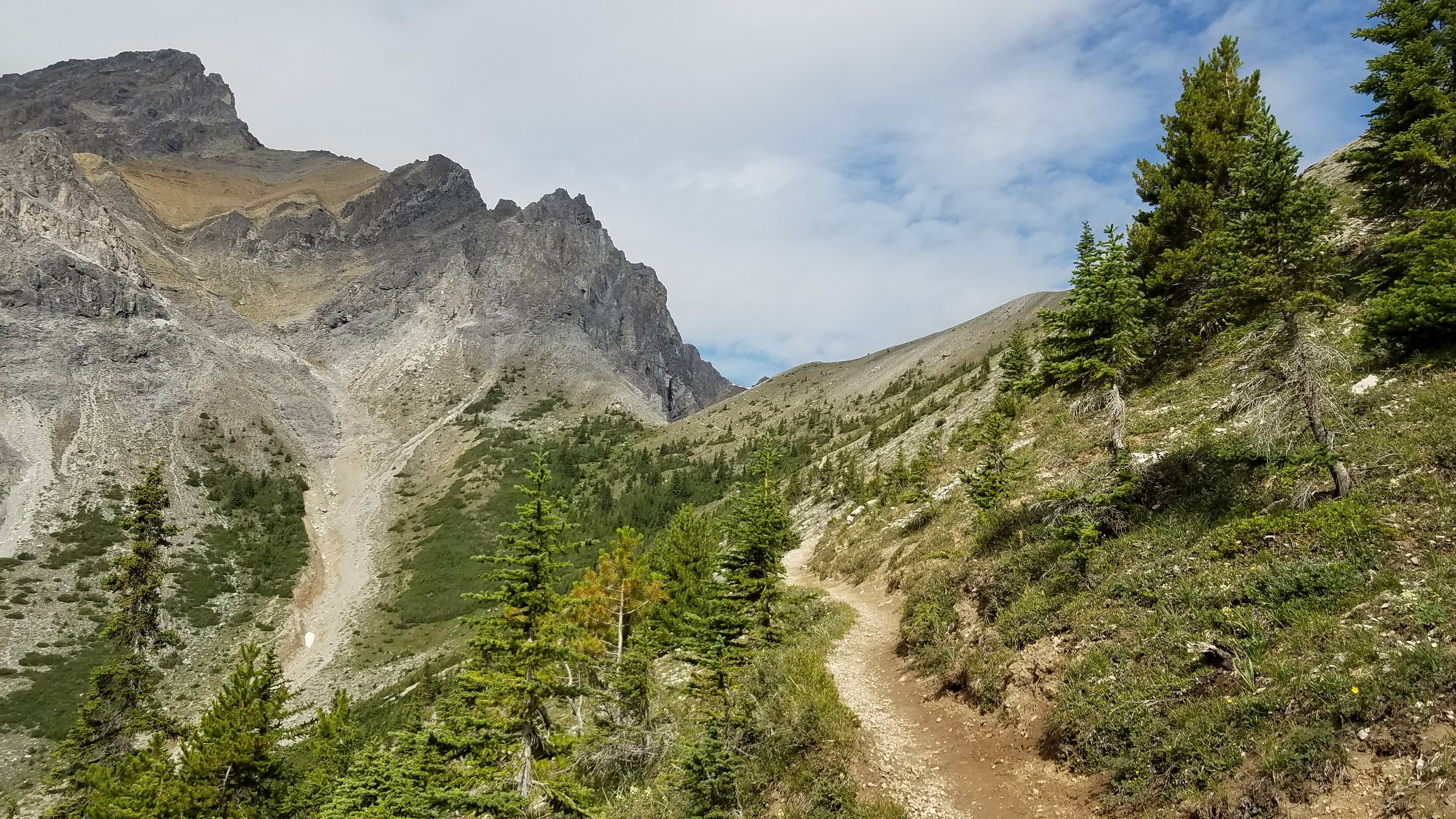
- Cory Pass, viewed from the trail
- Length: 13 km (8.1 mi)
- Location: Banff National Park, Alberta, Canada
- Trailheads: Near Banff, Alberta
- Use: Hiking (loop)
- Elevation gain/loss: 915 metres (3,000 ft) gain

The Cory Pass Loop is a trail in Banff National Park. The pass is located outside the city of Banff, Alberta, between Mount Edith and Mount Cory. It opens to Gargoyle Valley, with the trail circling the east side of Mount Edith and returning to the trailhead. The total elevation gain is 915 m (3,000 ft), and the total distance is 13 km (8.1 mi).
