= Mystic Peak =

Mountain summit in Alberta, Canada

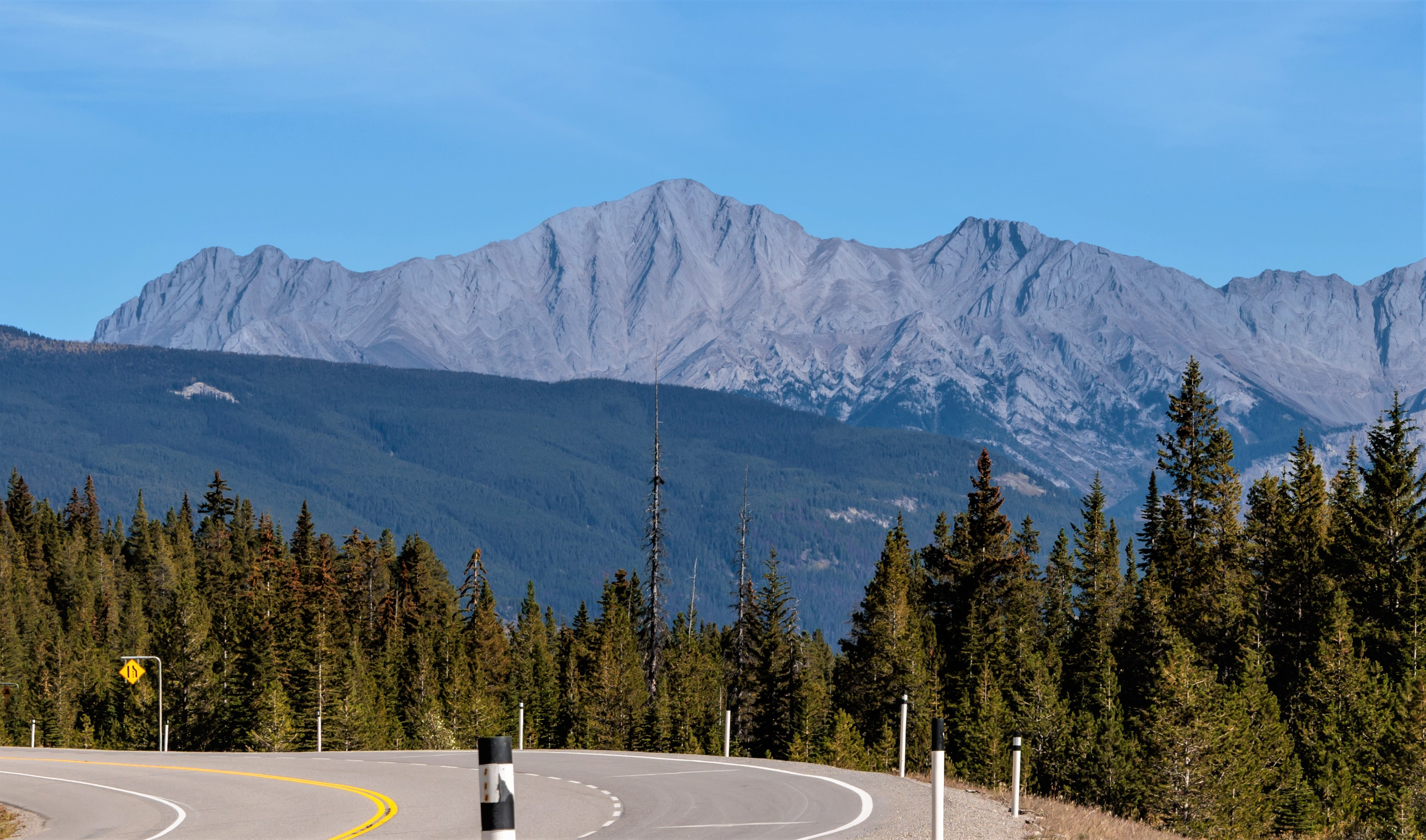
- West aspect, from Banff–Windermere Highway

Highest point
- Elevation: 2,960 m (9,710 ft)
- Prominence: 676 m (2,218 ft)
- Parent peak: Mount St. Bride (3,312 m)
- Isolation: 6.9 km (4.3 mi)
- Coordinates: 51°17′24″N 115°46′38″W

Geography
- Location within Alberta Location within Canada
- Country: Canada
- Province: Alberta
- Protected area: Banff National Park
- Parent range: Sawback Range; Canadian Rockies
- Topo map: NTS 82O5 Castle Mountain

Geology
- Rock age: Devonian
- Mountain type: Fault block
- Rock type(s): Limestone, Shale, Dolomite

Mystic Peak is a mountain summit in the Canadian Rockies of Alberta, Canada. The name is not officially recognized by the Geographical Names Board of Canada. (Note: Searching the CGNDB for the peak name returns "No result found".)

== Description ==
Mystic Peak, 2,960 metres (9,711 ft), is located in the Sawback Range northeast of the Bow Valley Parkway in Banff National Park. The prominent peak is situated 10 kilometers east of Castle Junction, two kilometers southwest of Mystic Pass, two km northwest of Mystic Lake, and three km north of Mount Ishbel. The peak and pass are named in association with Mystic Lake which is a popular destination for fishing cutthroat trout. Precipitation runoff from the mountain drains west into Johnston Creek which is a tributary of the Bow River, and east to the Cascade River via Forty Mile Creek. Topographic relief is significant as the summit rises 1,320 metres (4,331 ft) above Johnston Creek in three kilometres (1.9 mile).

== Climate ==
Based on the Köppen climate classification, Mystic Peak is located in a subarctic climate zone with cold, snowy winters, and mild summers. Winter temperatures can drop below −20 °C with wind chill factors below −30 °C.

== Geology ==
Like other mountains in Banff Park, the mountain is composed of sedimentary rock laid down from the Precambrian to Jurassic periods. Formed in shallow seas, this sedimentary rock was pushed east and over the top of younger rock during the Laramide orogeny.

== See also ==
- Geology of the Rocky Mountains
- Geography of Alberta
- Alberta's Rockies
