= Pulsatilla Pass =

Mountain pass in Alberta, Canada

Pullsatilla Pass

- Location within Alberta
- Elevation: 2,362 metres (7,749 ft)

Third Approach
- Location: Banff National Park, Alberta
- Range: Canadian Rockies
- Coordinates: 51°24′48″N 115°57′39″W
- Topo map: NTS 82O5 Castle Mountain

Pulsatilla Pass is a mountain pass located in Banff National Park. As the sources for both Johnston Creek, and Wildflower Creek it is located near the Sawback Range between Johnston Canyon and Lake Louise, Alberta.

The pass was named for the generic name of the species Pulsatilla occidentalis (western pasqueflower, syn. Anemone occidentalis), which grows in the area.
