= Block Mountain =

Mountain in Alberta, Canada

- Location within Alberta

Highest point
- Elevation: 2,935 m (9,629 ft)
- Prominence: 284 m (932 ft)
- Listing: Mountains of Alberta
- Coordinates: 51°22′38″N 115°50′59″W

Geography
- Country: Canada
- Province: Alberta
- Protected area: Banff National Park
- Parent range: Sawback Range
- Topo map: NTS 82O5 Castle Mountain

Climbing
- First ascent: 1920 Morrison P. Bridgland (Topographical Survey)

Block Mountain is a mountain located in the Sawback Range in Alberta, Canada. It was named Block Mountain in 1958 because vertical fractures, of which part of the mountain is made, look like they are composed of giant blocks, and are known as block mountains.
