= Mount Louis =

Mountain in Banff NP, Canada

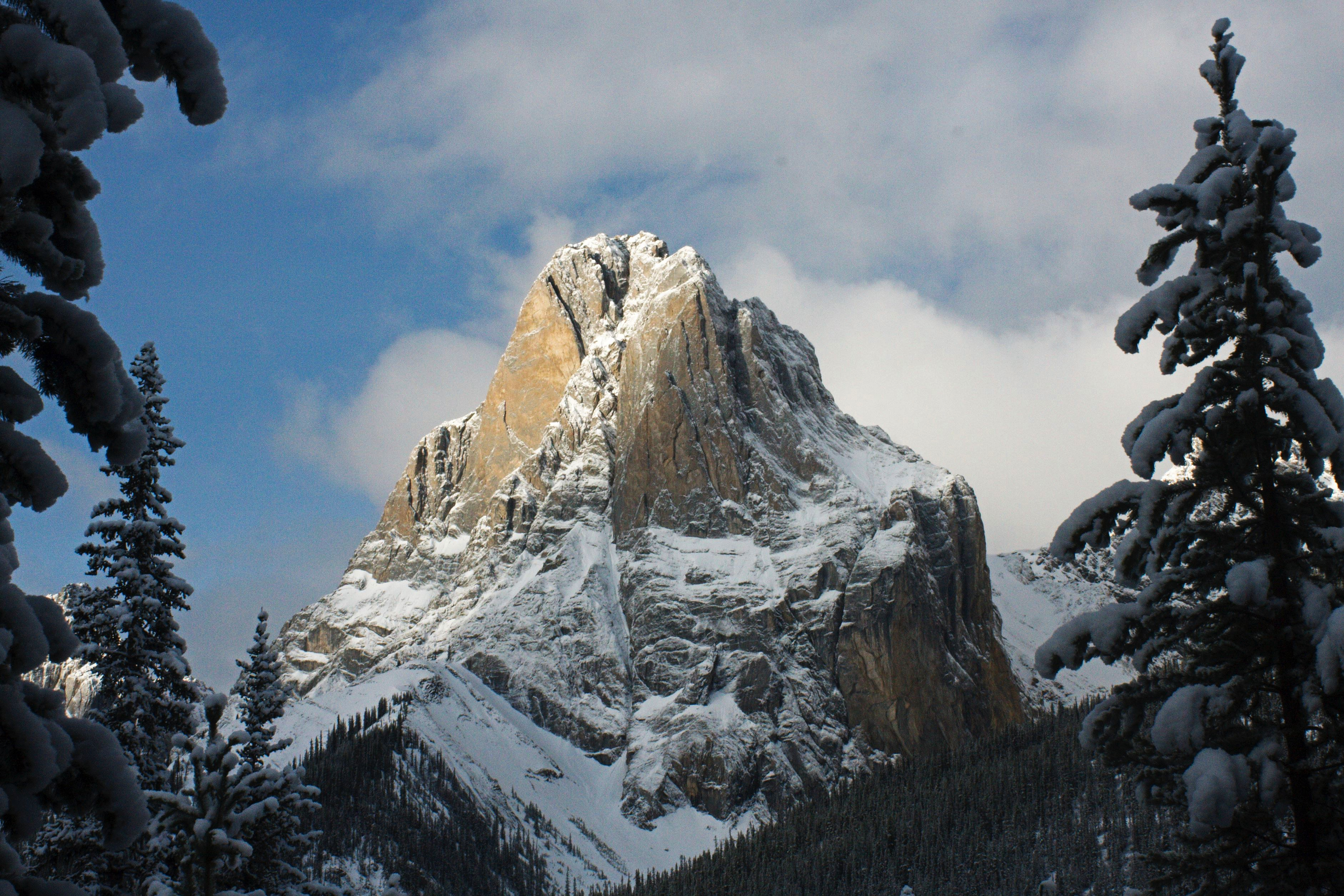

Highest point
- Elevation: 2,682 m (8,799 ft)
- Prominence: 336 m (1,102 ft)
- Parent peak: Mount Cory (2802 m)
- Listing: Mountains of Alberta
- Coordinates: 51°12′54″N 115°40′45″W

Geography
- Location within Alberta
- Interactive map of Mount Louis
- Country: Canada
- Province: Alberta
- Protected area: Banff National Park
- Parent range: Sawback Range
- Topo map: NTS 82O4 Banff

Geology
- Rock age: Devonian
- Mountain type: Limestone

Climbing
- First ascent: 1916 by Conrad Kain and Albert H. McCarthy
- Easiest route: rock climb (YDS 5.6)

Mount Louis is a 2,682-metre (8,799-foot) mountain summit located in southeast Banff National Park in Alberta, Canada. It is part of the Sawback Range which is a subset of the Canadian Rockies.

The mountain was named in 1886 after Louis B. Stewart who surveyed in the Banff Park area in 1904 with his father, George Stewart, the first Park Superintendent.

== Geology ==
Mount Louis is composed of limestone, a sedimentary rock laid down during the Devonian period. Formed in shallow seas, this sedimentary rock was pushed east and over the top of younger rock during the Laramide orogeny.

== Climate ==
Based on the Köppen climate classification, Mount Louis is located in a subarctic climate zone with cold, snowy winters, and mild summers. Temperatures can drop below -20 °C with wind chill factors below -30 °C. Weather conditions during summer months are optimum for climbing. Precipitation runoff from Mount Louis drains into the Bow River which is a tributary of the Saskatchewan River.

== Gallery ==
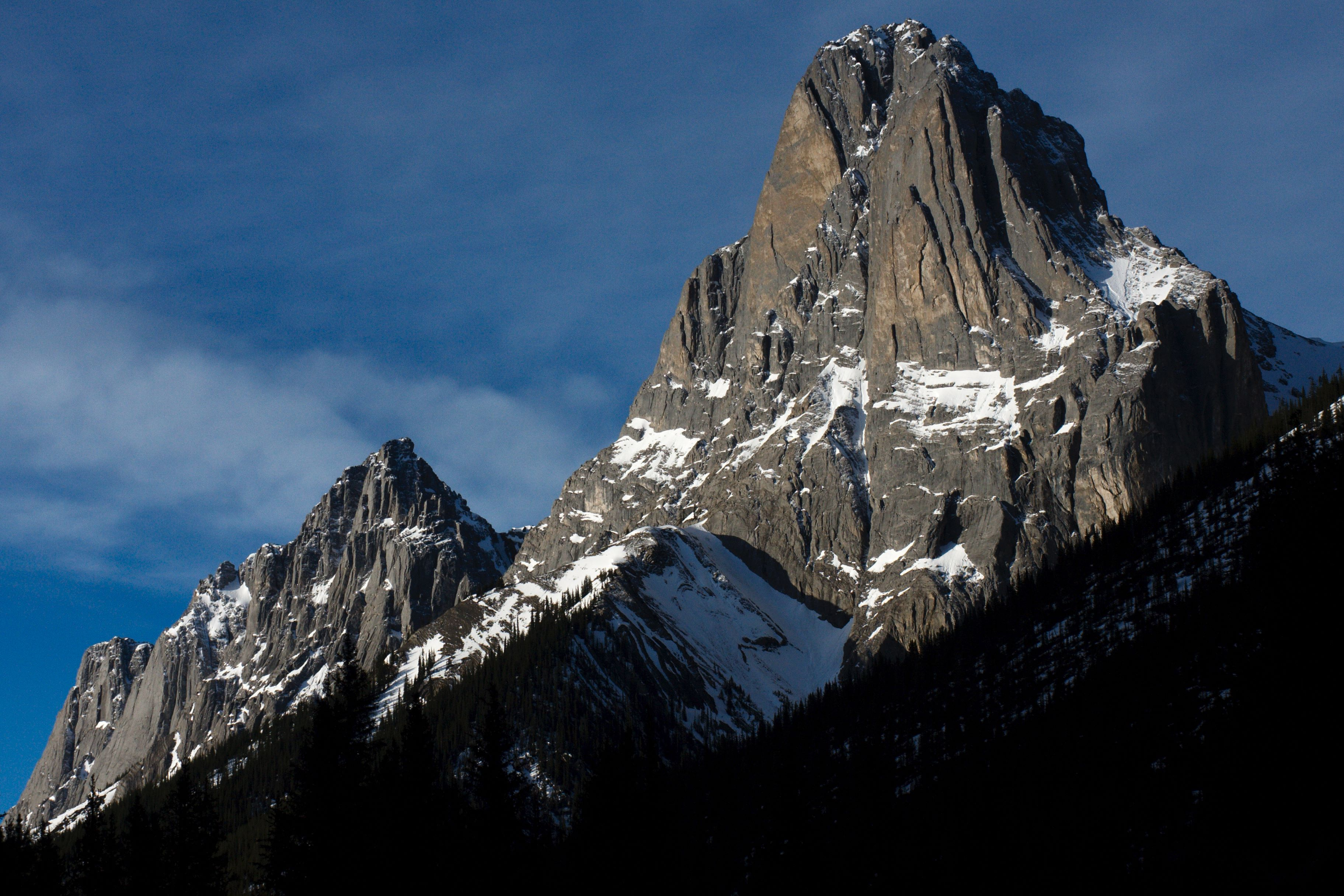
Mt. Louis

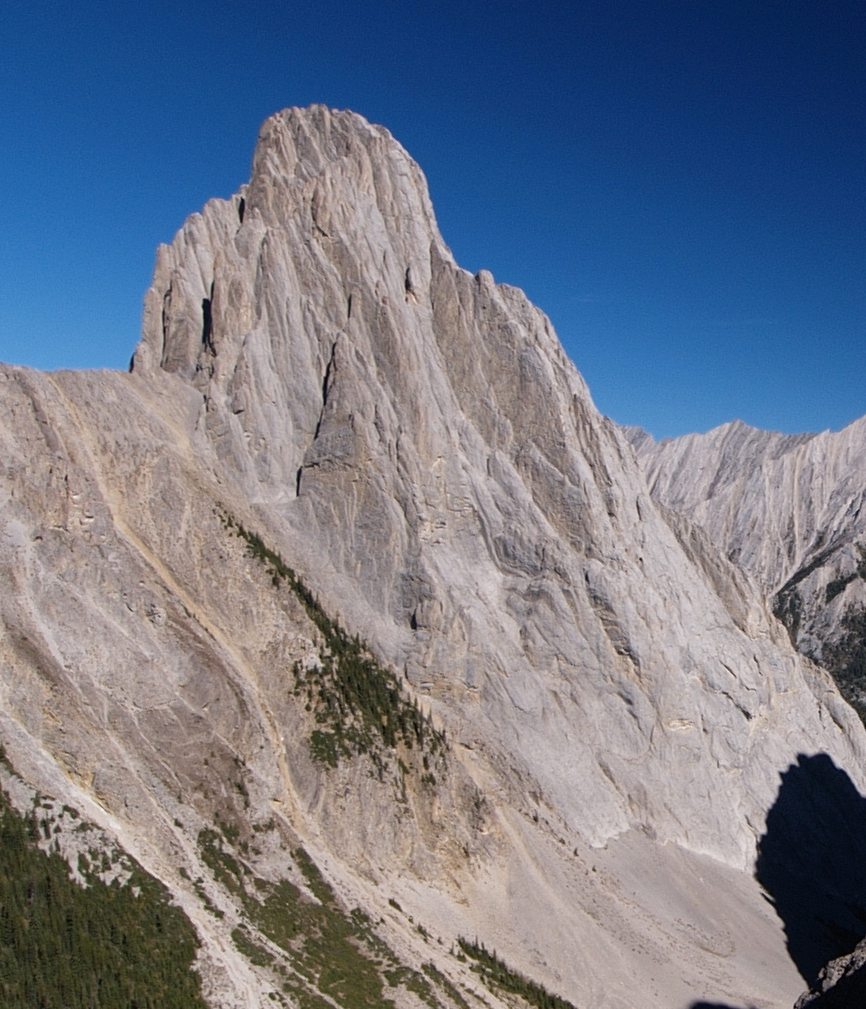
Mount Louis seen from Cory Pass

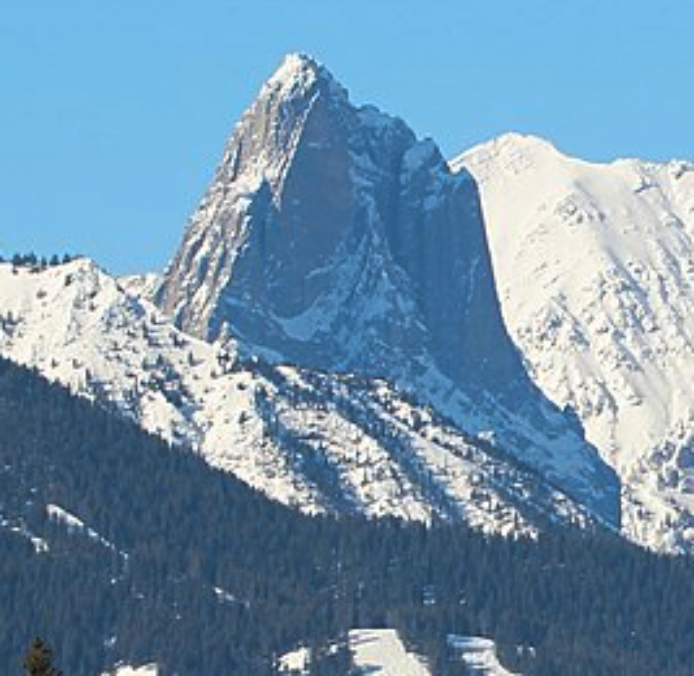
Mount Louis seen from Johnson Lake

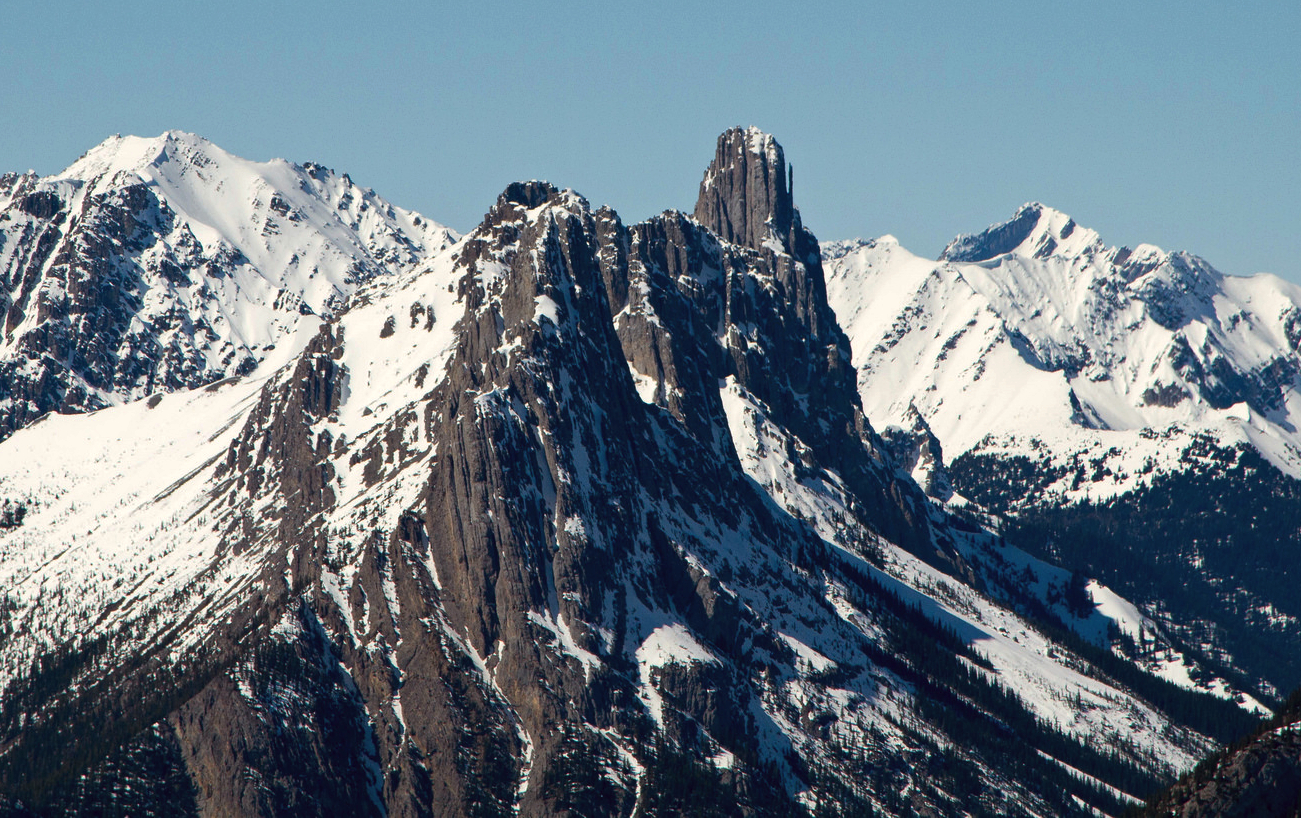
Telephoto of Mount Louis as seen from Sulphur Mountain

== See also ==
- List of mountains of Canada
- Geology of Alberta
