= Cockscomb Mountain (Alberta) =

Mountain in Alberta, Canada

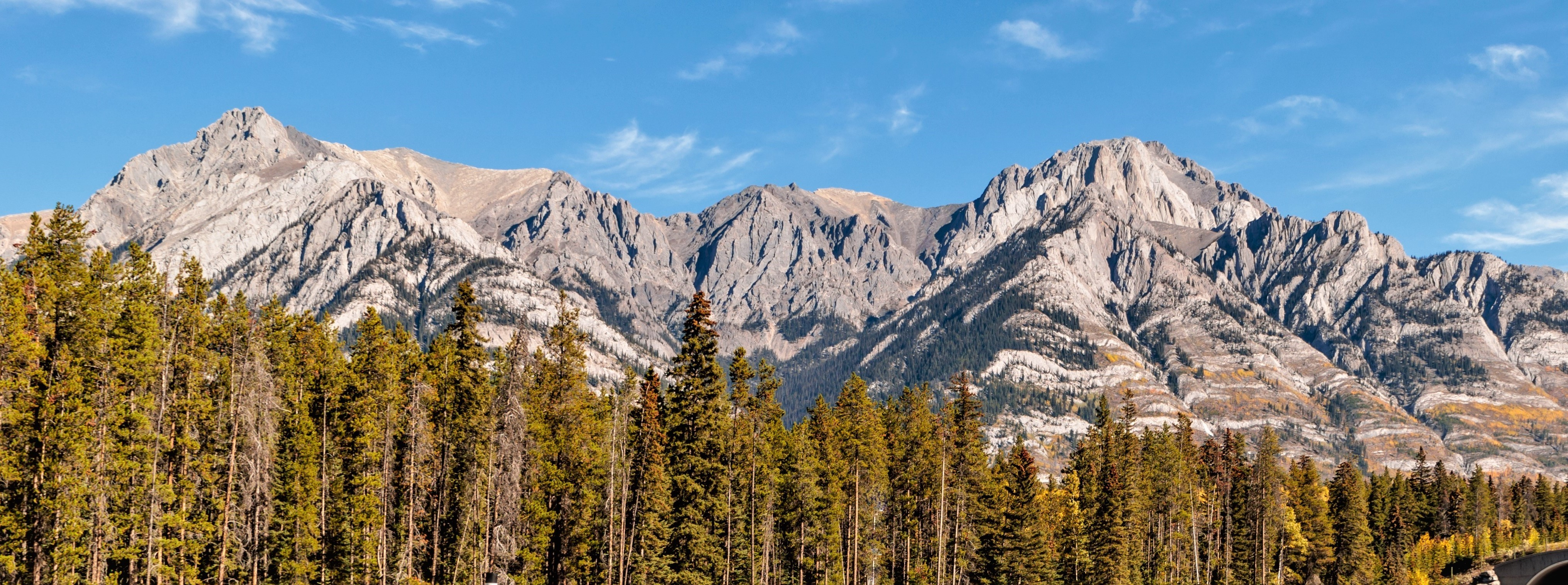
- Cockscomb Mountain (left) and The Finger (right)

Highest point
- Elevation: 2,776 m (9,108 ft)
- Prominence: 220 m (720 ft)
- Listing: Mountains of Alberta
- Coordinates: 51°14′12″N 115°43′30″W

Geography
- Location within Alberta Location within Canada
- Country: Canada
- Province: Alberta
- Protected area: Banff National Park
- Parent range: Sawback Range; Canadian Rockies
- Topo map: NTS 82O4 Banff

Climbing
- Easiest route: Easy Scramble

Cockscomb Mountain was named in 1921 because the outline of the summit was said to resemble a roosters comb. It is located in the Sawback Range in Alberta, Canada. The mountain is composed of sedimentary rock laid down during the Precambrian to Jurassic periods. Formed in shallow seas, this sedimentary rock was pushed east and over the top of younger rock during the Laramide orogeny.

== Climate ==
Based on the Köppen climate classification, Cockscomb Mountain is located in a subarctic climate zone with cold, snowy winters, and mild summers. Temperatures can drop below −20 °C with wind chill factors below −30 °C. Precipitation runoff from the mountain drains into tributaries of the Bow River.

== See also ==
- List of mountains of Canada
- Geography of Alberta
