= Mount Cory =

Mount Cory can refer to:

- Mount Cory (Alberta), a mountain in Alberta, Canada
- Mount Cory, Ohio, a village in Ohio, United States
