= Protection Mountain =

Mountain in the Canadian Rockies of Alberta, Canada

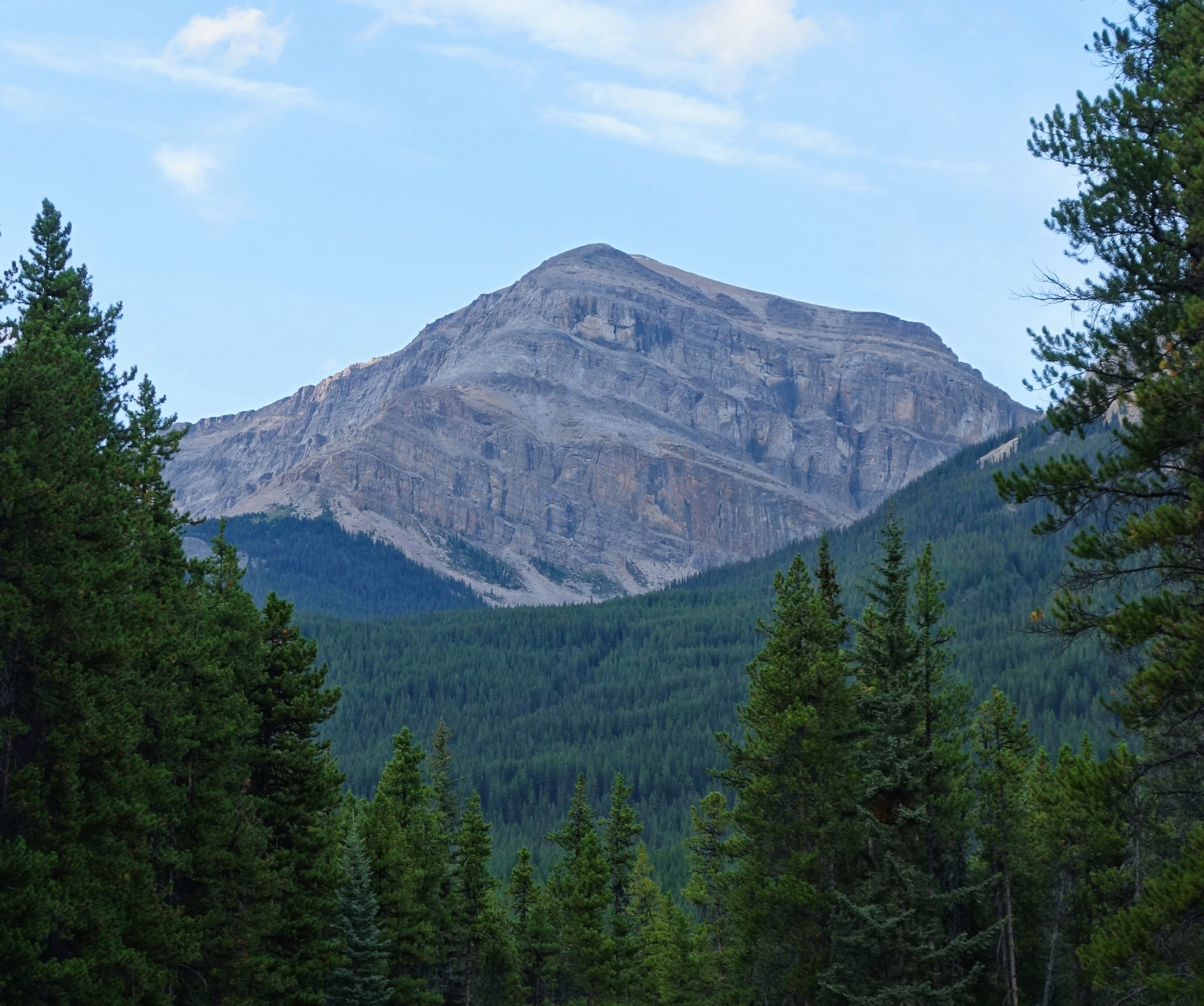
- South aspect

Highest point
- Elevation: 2,972 m (9,751 ft)
- Prominence: 309 m (1,014 ft)
- Isolation: 4.43 km (2.75 mi)
- Listing: Mountains of Alberta
- Coordinates: 51°21′11″N 115°59′09″W

Geography
- Location within Alberta Location within Canada
- Country: Canada
- Province: Alberta
- Protected area: Banff National Park
- Parent range: Sawback Range; Canadian Rockies
- Topo map: NTS 82N8 Lake Louise

Geology
- Rock age: Cambrian
- Mountain type: Fault block
- Rock type(s): Limestone, Shale, Dolomite

Climbing
- Easiest route: Scramble

Protection Mountain is a mountain in the Canadian Rockies of Alberta, Canada.

== Description ==
Protection Mountain, 2,972 m (9,751 ft) in elevation, is located in the Sawback Range immediately north of Castle Mountain in Banff National Park. The peak is situated 12 km (7.5 mi) southeast of Lake Louise hamlet and 5 km (3.1 mi) east of the Bow Valley Parkway. Precipitation runoff from the mountain drains into the Bow River. Topographic relief is significant as the summit rises 1,470 m (4,820 ft) above Bow Valley in 4 km (2.5 mi). The mountain was so named in 1911 by James F. Porter (1871–1939) because the mountain is said to protect an especially beautiful valley to the north which he called Wonder Valley. The mountain's toponym and position was officially adopted on October 20, 1983, by the Geographical Names Board of Canada. The summit is unofficially called "Television Peak" and it ranks as the sixth-highest peak in the Sawback Range.

== Climate ==
Based on the Köppen climate classification, Protection Mountain is located in a subarctic climate zone with cold, snowy winters, and mild summers. Winter temperatures can drop below −20 °C with wind chill factors below −30 °C.

== Geology ==
Like other mountains in Banff Park, Protection Mountain is composed of sedimentary rock laid down from the Precambrian to Jurassic periods. Formed in shallow seas, this sedimentary rock was pushed east and over the top of younger rock during the Laramide orogeny.

== See also ==
- Geology of the Rocky Mountains
- Geography of Alberta
- Alberta's Rockies
