= Mount Avens =

Mountain in Alberta, Canada

- Location within Alberta

Highest point
- Elevation: 2,972 m (9,751 ft)
- Prominence: 259 m (850 ft)
- Parent peak: Pulsatilla Mountain (3,035 m)
- Isolation: 2.11 km (1.31 mi)
- Listing: Mountains of Alberta
- Coordinates: 51°25′03″N 115°59′32″W

Geography
- Country: Canada
- Province: Alberta
- Protected area: Banff National Park
- Parent range: Sawback Range
- Topo map: NTS 82O5 Castle Mountain

Mount Avens is a summit in the Sawback Range of Banff National Park in Alberta, Canada.

Mount Avens was so named in 1911 on account of avens flowers in the area.
