= Oyster Peak =

Mountain in Alberta, Canada

- Location within Alberta

Highest point
- Elevation: 2,777 m (9,111 ft)
- Prominence: 186 m (610 ft)
- Listing: Mountains of Alberta
- Coordinates: 51°31′33″N 116°01′06″W

Geography
- Country: Canada
- Province: Alberta
- Parent range: Sawback Range
- Topo map: NTS 82N9 Hector Lake

Climbing
- Easiest route: Moderate scramble via west-facing slopes

Oyster Peak was named by George M. Dawson in 1884. It is located in the Sawback Range in Alberta.

== See also ==
- Geography of Alberta
