= Mount Robertson =

Mountain on Alberta/British Columbia boundary in Canada

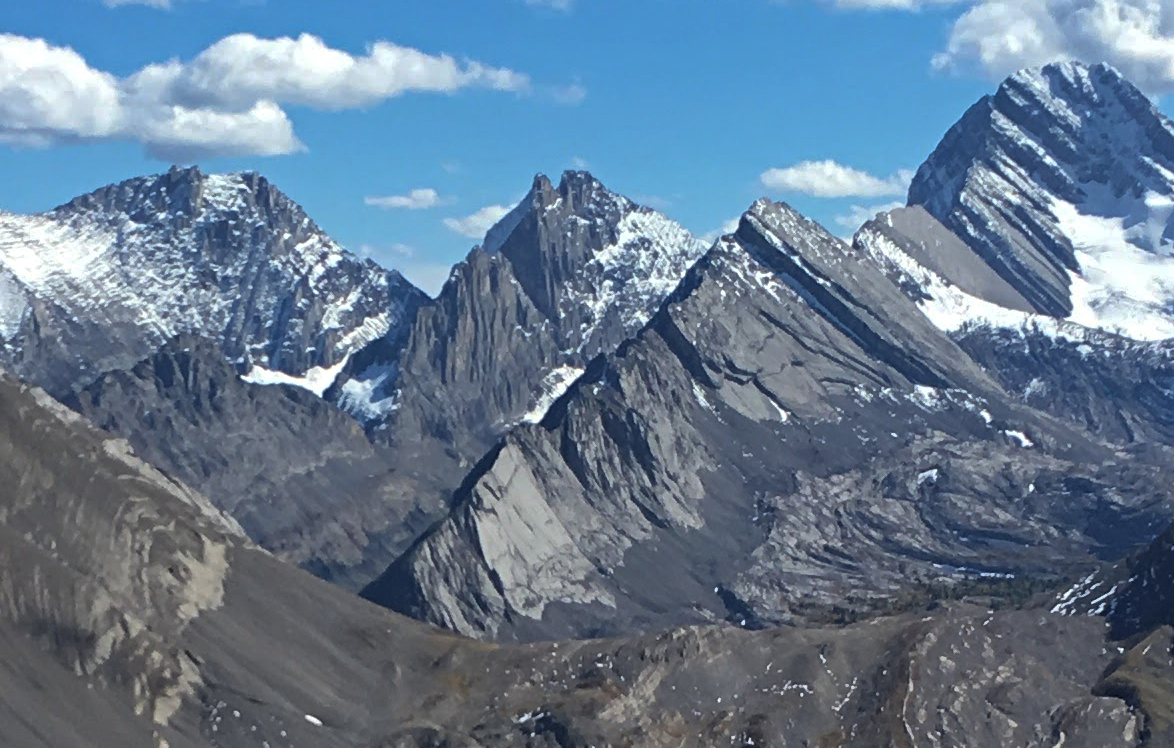
- Mount Robertson (centered) between Mount Sir Douglas dominating the right side and Mount French to the left side

Highest point
- Elevation: 3,177 m (10,423 ft) (Note: Multiple sources give elevations of 3177 metres, and 3194 metres.)
- Prominence: 281 m (922 ft) (Note: Given a summit elevation of 3177 metres.)
- Listing: Mountains of Alberta; Mountains of British Columbia
- Coordinates: 50°43′35″N 115°19′16″W

Geography
- Location within Alberta Location within British Columbia Location within Canada
- Country: Canada
- Provinces: Alberta and British Columbia
- Parent range: Spray Mountains
- Topo map: NTS 82J11 Kananaskis Lakes

Climbing
- First ascent: 1928 J.W.A. Hickson and Edward Feuz Jr.

Mount Robertson is a mountain in the Canadian Rockies, standing astride the British Columbia-Alberta boundary between Palliser Pass and North Kananaskis Pass. The British Columbia side of the pass is in Mount Assiniboine Provincial Park. The mountain is named for Sir William Robertson (1860–1933), 1st Baronet, Chief of the Imperial General Staff from 1916 to 1918 during the First World War.

== Geology ==
Mount Robertson is composed of sedimentary rock laid down during the Precambrian to Jurassic periods. Formed in shallow seas, this sedimentary rock was pushed east and over the top of younger rock during the Laramide orogeny. The Haig Glacier, largest singular glacier in Kananaskis Country, lies to the south of the peak.

== Climate ==
Based on the Köppen climate classification, Mount Robertson is located in a subarctic climate with cold, snowy winters, and mild summers. Temperatures can drop below −20 °C with wind chill factors below −30 °C.

== See also ==
- List of peaks on the Alberta–British Columbia border
- List of mountains in the Canadian Rockies
