= J. W. A. Hickson =

Joseph William Andrew Hickson
- Born: 1873; Montreal, Quebec
- Died: April 22, 1956; Montreal, Quebec
- Occupations: Psychologist, mountaineer
- Known for: Many first ascents in the Canadian Rockies

Joseph William Andrew Hickson (1873–1956) was a Canadian psychologist and mountaineer. As a mountaineer, he was the first to ascend 30 major peaks including Pinnacle Mountain, Mount St. Bride, Mount Chephren, Mount Sir Douglas, Mount Fifi, Mount Joffre, Mount Spring-Rice, Mount King Edward, Mount Fryatt, and Mount Robertson.

He was the son of Sir Joseph Hickson.

== Education ==
After graduating from McGill University in 1893 with the Prince of Wales Gold Medal for Moral and Mental Philosophy, he went on to obtain a masters degree in 1987. He then studied with Neo-Kantian Alois Riehl in Germany, earning his PHD in 1900. He taught at McGill from 1901 to 1924, latterly 13 years as professor of metaphysics and logic. In 1946, he assisted in the creation of The McGill University David Hume Collection.

== Mountaineering ==
Joseph was elected as President of the Alpine Club of Canada from 1924 to 1926, and was made an Honorary Member of the club in 1954. As President, he collaborated with American Alpine Club president Howard Palmer to complete 5 ascents.
