= The Finger (Alberta) =

Mountain in Alberta, Canada

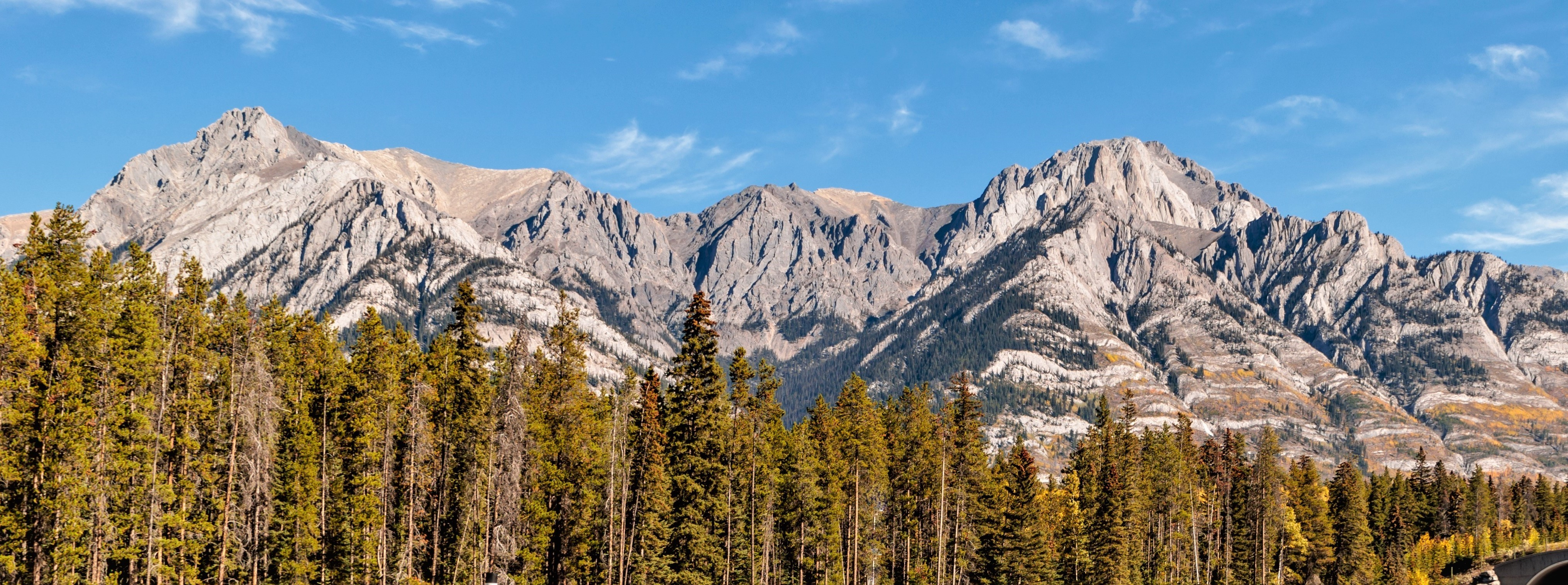
- Cockscomb Mountain (left) and The Finger (right)

Highest point
- Elevation: 2,545 m (8,350 ft)
- Listing: Mountains of Alberta
- Coordinates: 51°13′15″N 115°43′00″W

Geography
- Location within Alberta
- Country: Canada
- Province: Alberta
- Protected area: Banff National Park
- Parent range: Sawback Range
- Topo map: NTS 82O4 Banff

Climbing
- First ascent: 1935 by Lawrence Grassi
- Easiest route: YDS 5.5

The Finger is a mountain in the Sawback Range of the Canadian Rockies in Alberta, Canada. The name is unofficial as it does not appear in the Canadian Geographical Names Database.
