= Johnston Creek (Alberta) =

Creek in Alberta, Canada

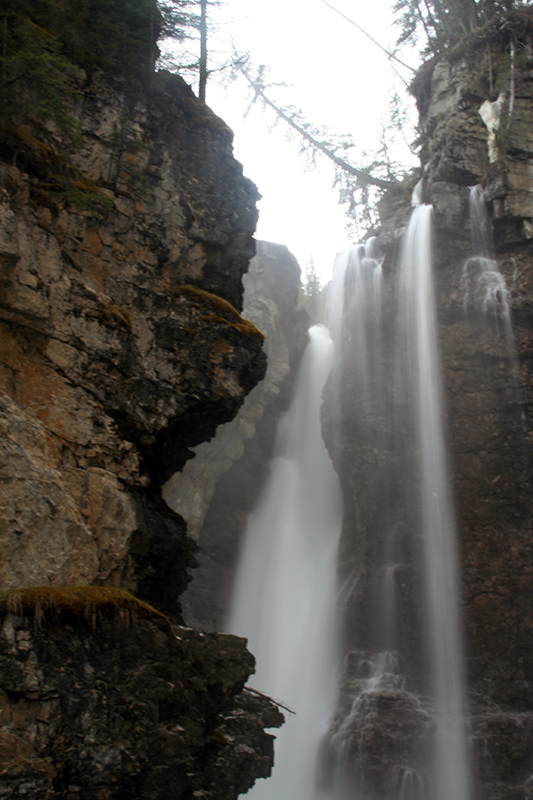
- Upper Falls in Johnston Canyon

Location
- Country: Canada
- Province: Alberta

Physical characteristics
- Source
  - location: Badger Pass, Pulsatilla Pass
  - coordinates: 51.3938°N 115.9478°W
  - elevation: 2,500 meters (8,200 ft)
- Mouth
  - location: Bow River
  - coordinates: 51.2417°N 115.8544°W
  - elevation: 1,440 meters (4,720 ft)

Johnston Creek is a tributary of the Bow River in Canada's Rocky Mountains. The creek is located in Banff National Park.

== Course ==
Johnston Creek originates north of Castle Mountain in a glacial valley southwest of Badger Pass and south of Pulsatilla Pass, at an elevation of 2,500 meters (8,200 ft). The creek flows southeast between Helena Ridge and the Sawback Range, and then south through a gorge known as Johnston Canyon. The stream empties into the Bow River, south of Castle Mountain, between Banff and Lake Louise, at an elevation of 1,440 meters (4,720 ft).

== Johnston Canyon ==
As Johnston Creek approaches the Bow River, it flows through a large canyon formed by erosion over thousands of years. The creek has cut through the limestone rock to form sheer canyon walls, as well as waterfalls, tunnels, and pools.

A popular hiking trail follows the canyon and leads to a meadow within the Johnston Valley above the canyon. The first part of the trail consists of a constructed walkway with safety rails and bridges, while the last part of the trail is natural and more rugged. Within the meadow are the Ink Pots, which are six blue-green spring-fed pools. In August 2018, a few of the "natural" trails near the falls were closed off, in an attempt to help recover the small nesting population of the American black swift.

Ice climbing is a popular activity on the frozen waterfalls in winter.

A tourist lodge and large parking area is located at the foot of the canyon, close to the creek mouth, along the Bow Valley Parkway (Highway 1A).

=== Gallery ===
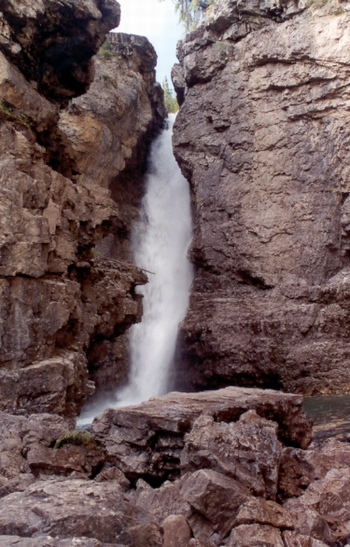
Cascade in Johnston Canyon

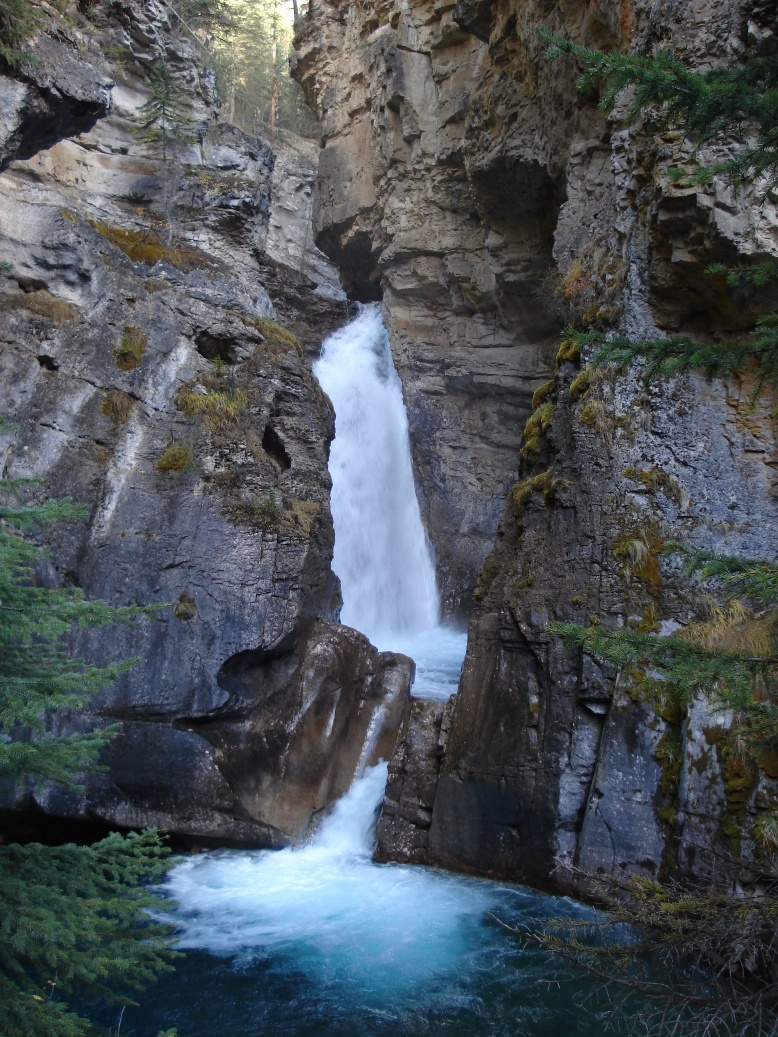
Lower Falls in Johnston Canyon

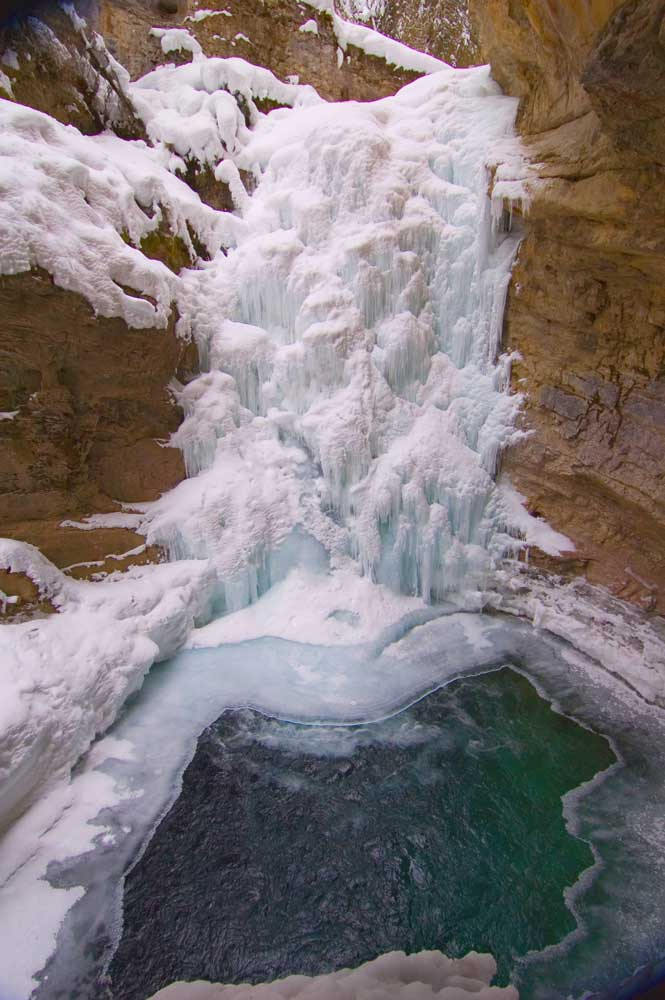
Frozen Lower Falls in Johnston Canyon

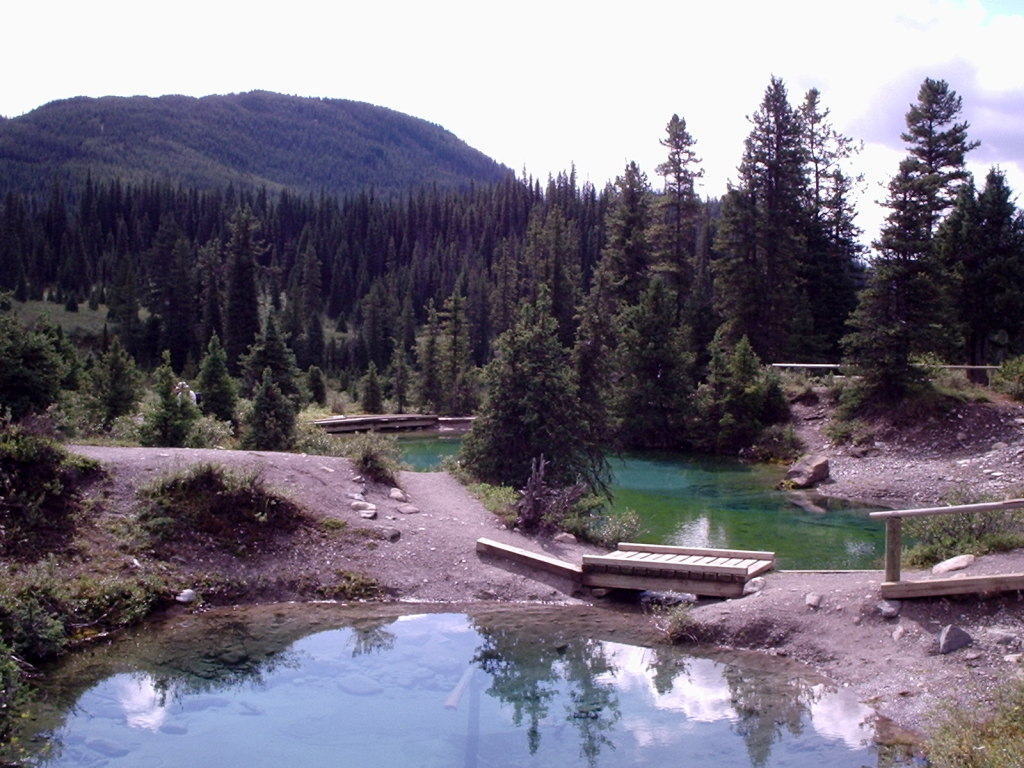
Ink Pots

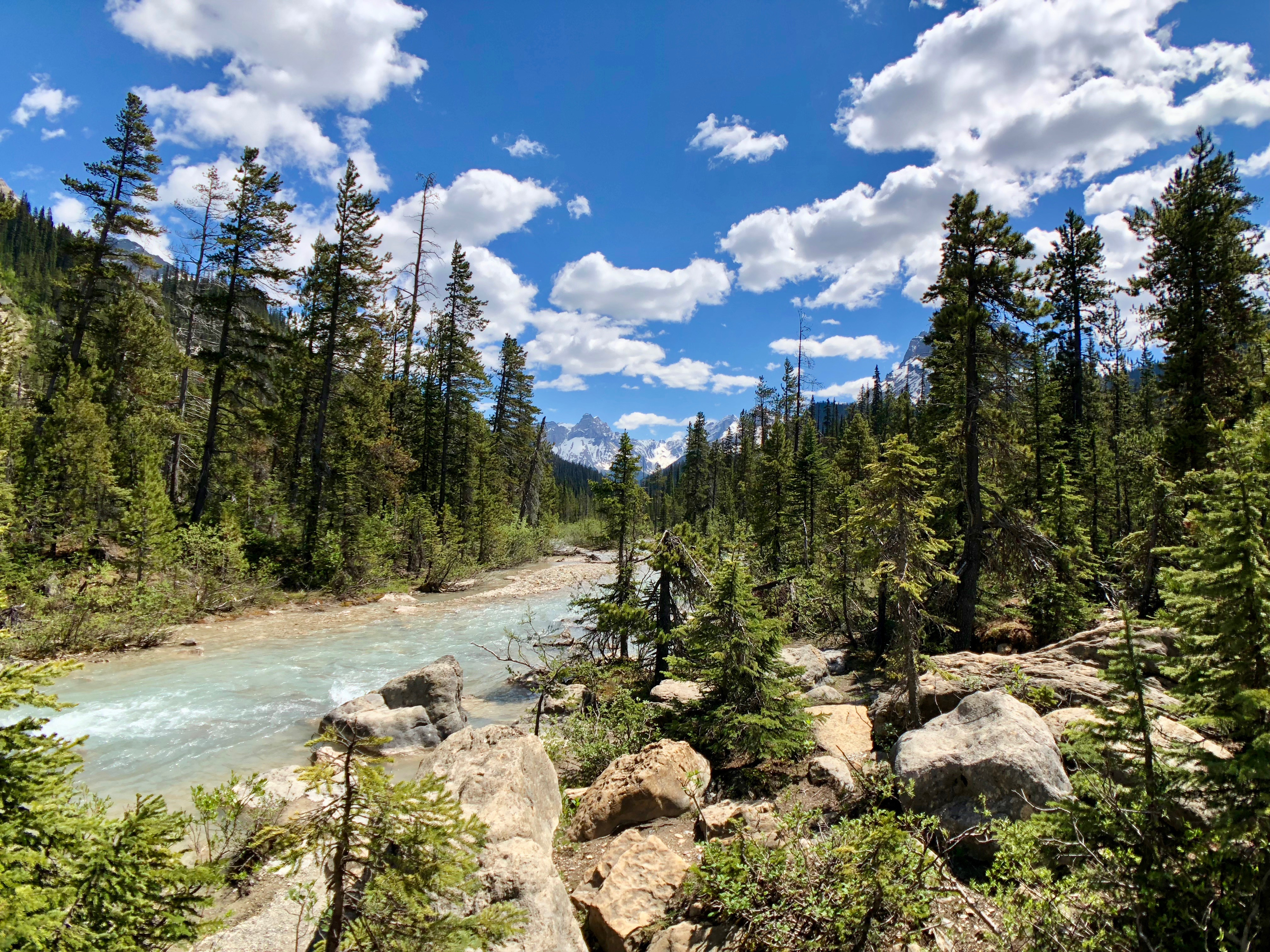
Johnston Canyon in Banff National Park

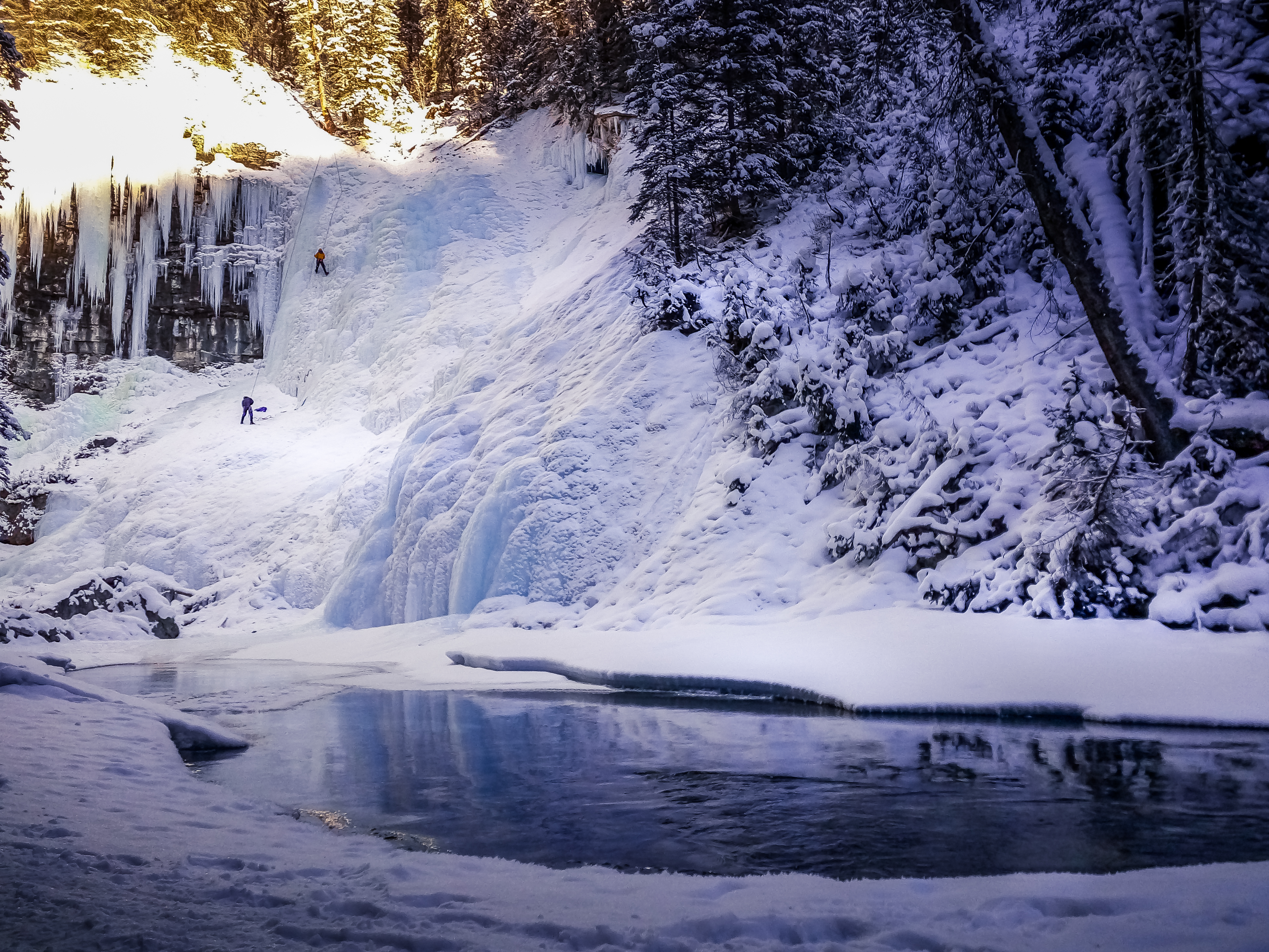
Ice climbing in Johnston Canyon in December 2016

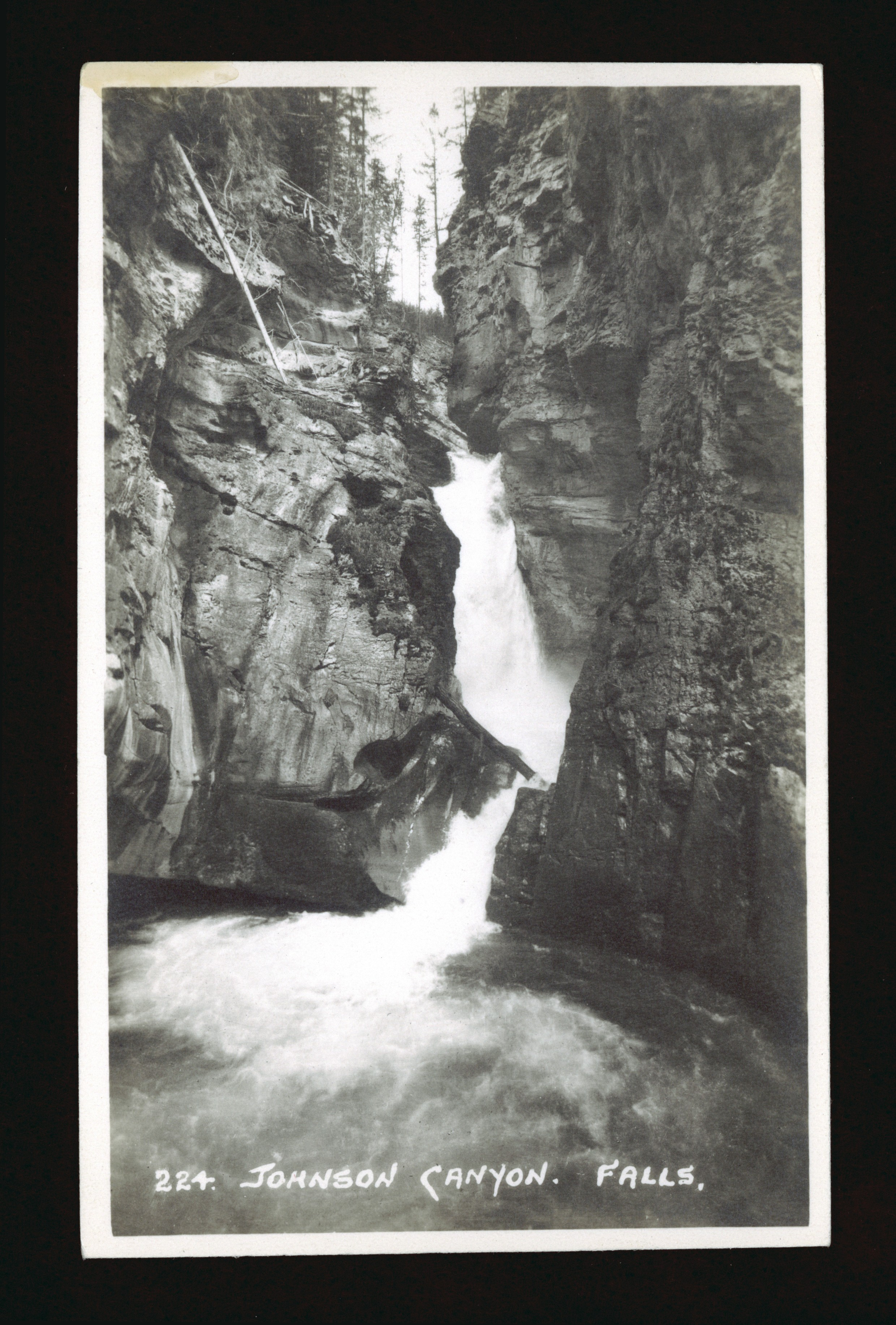
The lower falls pre-1942

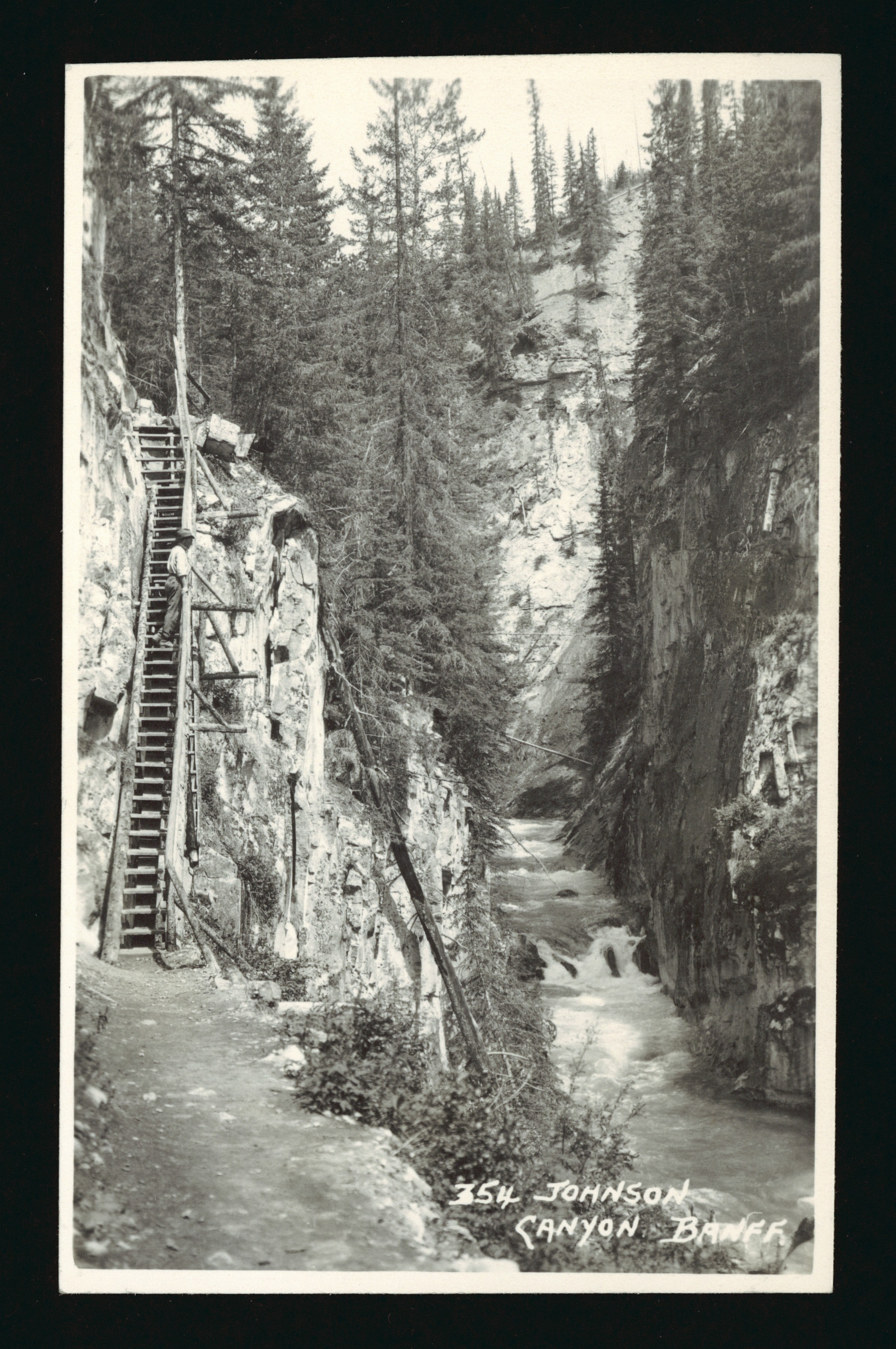
A wooden staircase along the creek pre-1942

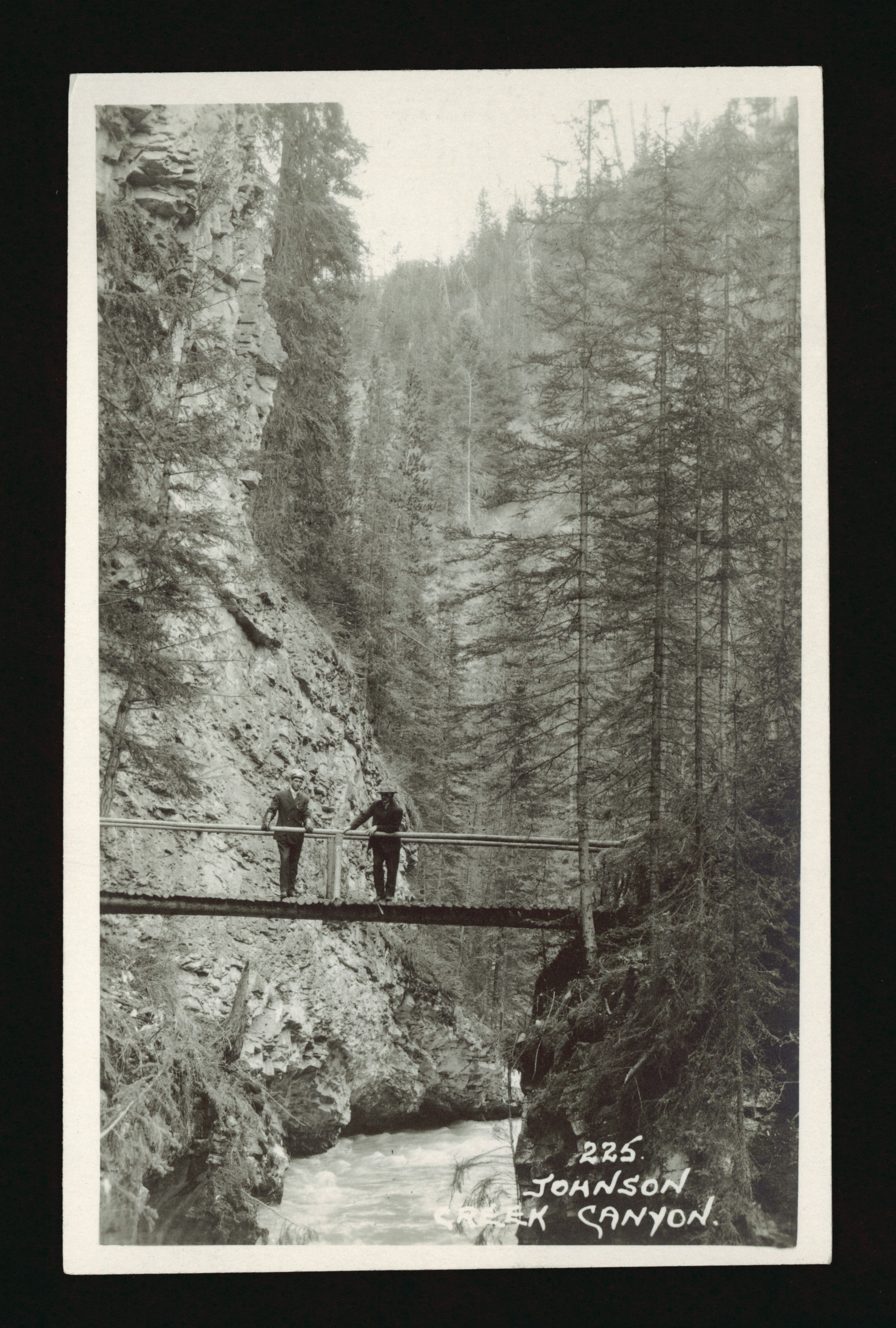
Two men standing on a wooden bridge over the creek pre-1942

== See also ==
- List of rivers of Alberta
