= Mount Edith =

Mountain in Alberta, Canada

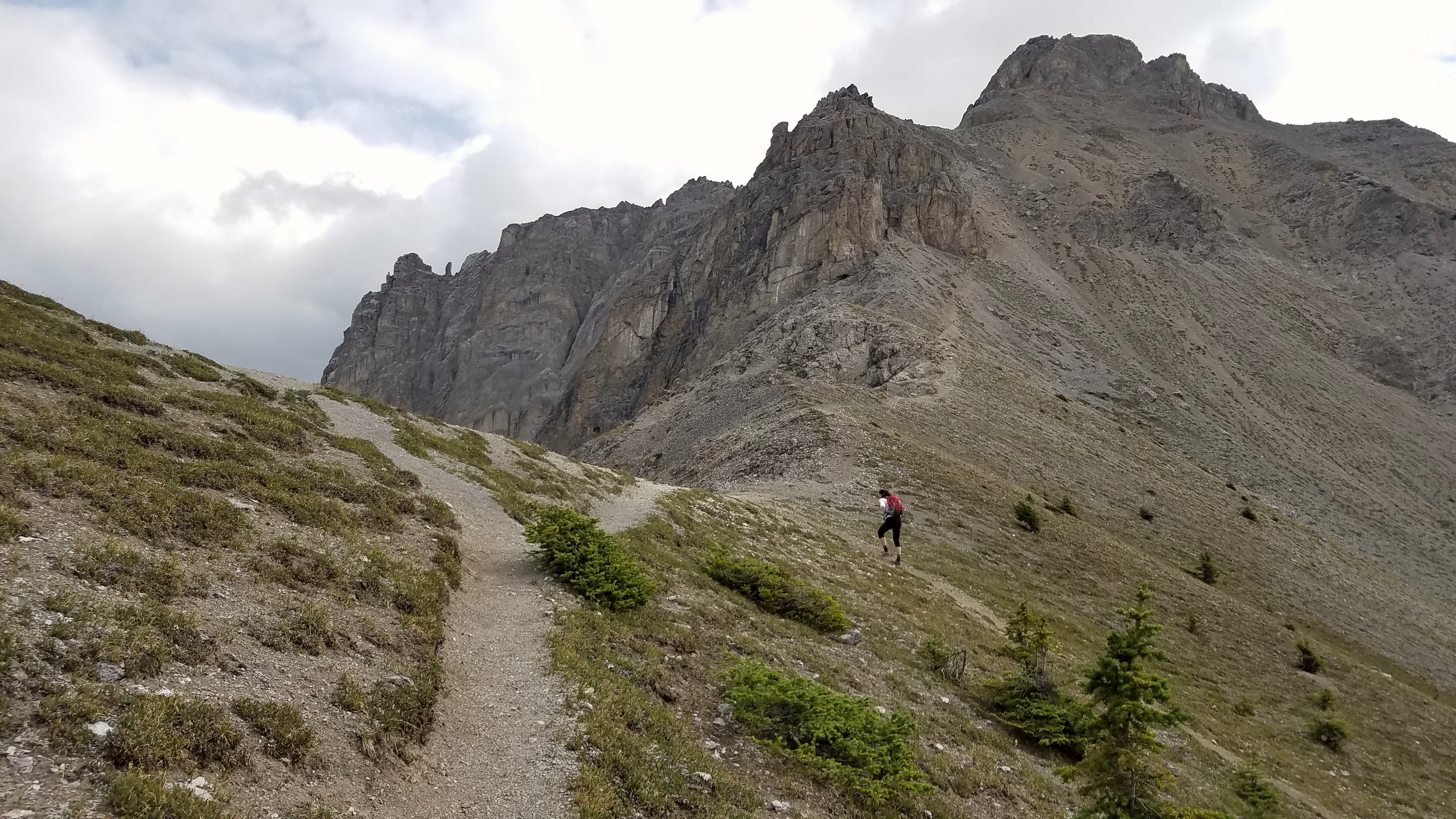
- Mount Edith with trail to summit

Highest point
- Elevation: 2,554 m (8,379 ft)
- Prominence: 101 m (331 ft)
- Listing: Mountains of Alberta
- Coordinates: 51°12′04″N 115°39′46″W

Geography
- Location within Alberta Location within Canada
- Country: Canada
- Province: Alberta
- Protected area: Banff National Park
- Parent range: Sawback Range; Canadian Rockies
- Topo map: NTS 82O4 Banff

Geology
- Rock age: Devonian
- Mountain type: Limestone

Climbing
- First ascent: 1900 by J. Norman Collie and P. Stevens
- Easiest route: Moderate/difficult scrambling for each peak

Mount Edith is a mountain located in the Bow River valley of Banff National Park. Situated in the Sawback Range, it comprises three limestone peaks (south, centre, north) with the southern peak being the highest followed by the centre and northern peaks respectively. All three peaks can be scrambled with the southern peak demanding the highest difficulty on the west side.

The mountain was named in 1886 for Edith Orde who worked as an assistant to Lady Agnes Macdonald, the wife of Canada's first prime minister.

== Geology ==
Mount Edith is composed of limestone, a sedimentary rock laid down during the Devonian period. Formed in shallow seas, this sedimentary rock was pushed east and over the top of younger rock during the Laramide orogeny.

== Climate ==
Based on the Köppen climate classification, Mount Edith is located in a subarctic climate with cold, snowy winters, and mild summers. Temperatures can drop below -20 C with wind chill factors below -30 C. Weather conditions during summer months are optimum for climbing.

== See also ==
- List of mountains of Canada
- Geology of Alberta
