= Mount St. Bride =

Mountain in Banff NP, Alberta, Canada

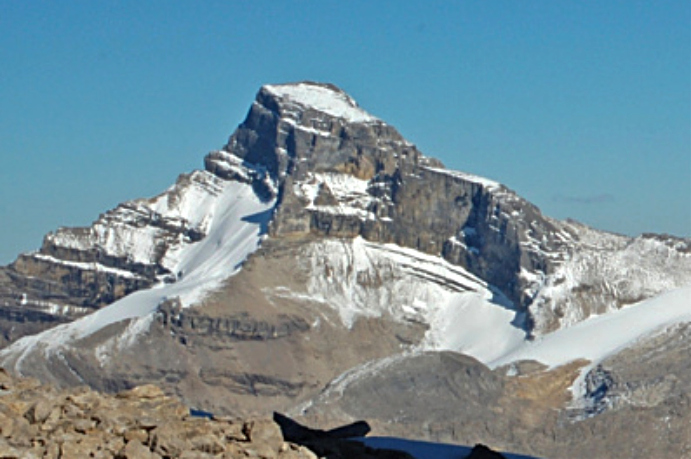
- Mount St Bride seen from Fossil Mountain

Highest point
- Elevation: 3,315 m (10,876 ft)
- Prominence: 1,207 m (3,960 ft)
- Parent peak: Mount Hector (3394 m)
- Listing: Mountains of Alberta
- Coordinates: 51°30′28″N 115°57′19″W

Geography
- Location within Alberta Location within Canada
- Interactive map of Mount St. Bride
- Country: Canada
- Province: Alberta
- Protected area: Banff National Park
- Parent range: Sawback Range; Canadian Rockies
- Topo map: NTS 82O12 Barrier Mountain

Geology
- Rock age: Cambrian
- Rock type: Sedimentary rock

Climbing
- First ascent: 1910 J.W.A. Hickson, Edward Feuz Sr., Edward Feuz Jr.

Mount St. Bride is a prominent 3,315-metre (10,876 ft) mountain summit located in Banff National Park, in the Rocky Mountains of Alberta. It is the highest point in the Sawback Range. Its nearest higher peak is Cataract Peak, located 18.8 km (11.7 mi) to the northwest. Mount St. Bride is situated 2.0 km (1.2 mi) to the south of Mount Douglas, near the headwaters of the Red Deer River.

== History ==
Mount St. Bride was named in 1898 in honor of Saint Bride, the patron saint of the Douglas family.

The first ascent of the mountain was achieved in 1910 by J. W. A. Hickson accompanied by guides, Edward Feuz Sr. and Edward Feuz Jr.

The mountain's name was officially adopted in 1956 when approved by the Geographical Names Board of Canada.

== Geology ==
Like other mountains in Banff Park, Mount St. Bride is composed of sedimentary rock that was deposited during the Precambrian to Jurassic periods. Formed in shallow seas, this sedimentary rock was pushed eastward and over the top of younger rock during the Laramide orogeny.

== Climate ==
Based on the Köppen climate classification, Mount St. Bride is located in a subarctic climate zone characterized by cold, snowy winters, and mild summers. Winter temperatures can drop below −20 °C, with wind chill factors reaching below −30 °C.

== Gallery ==
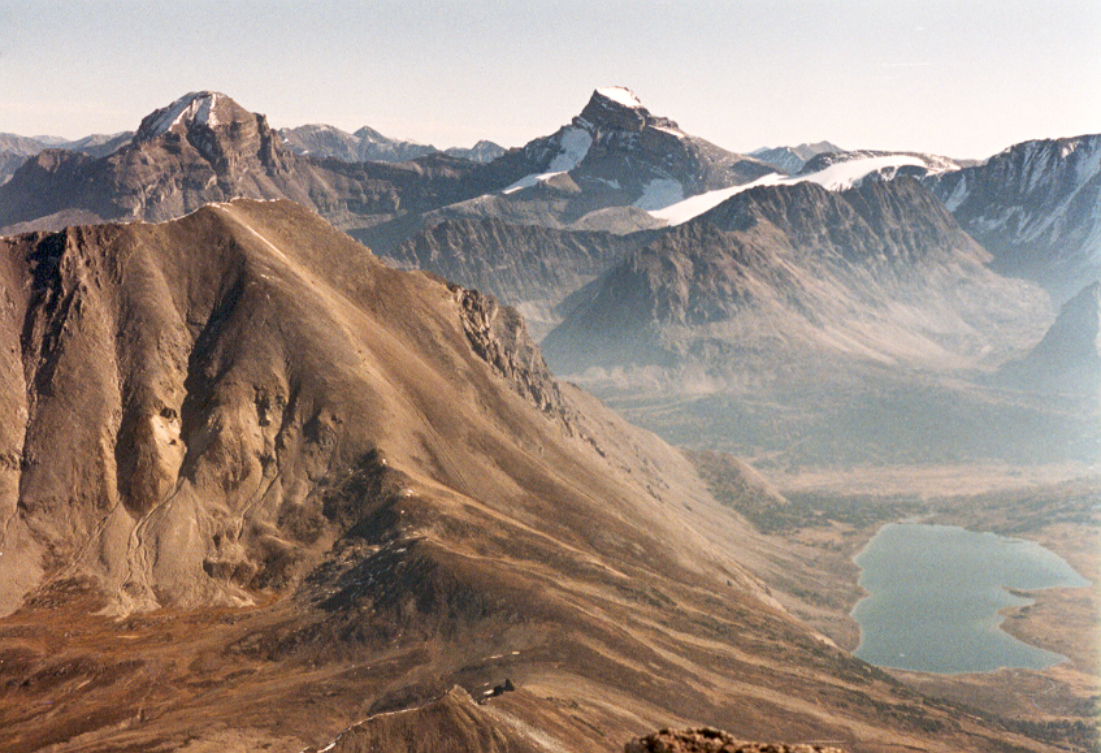
Mount St. Bride in the distance

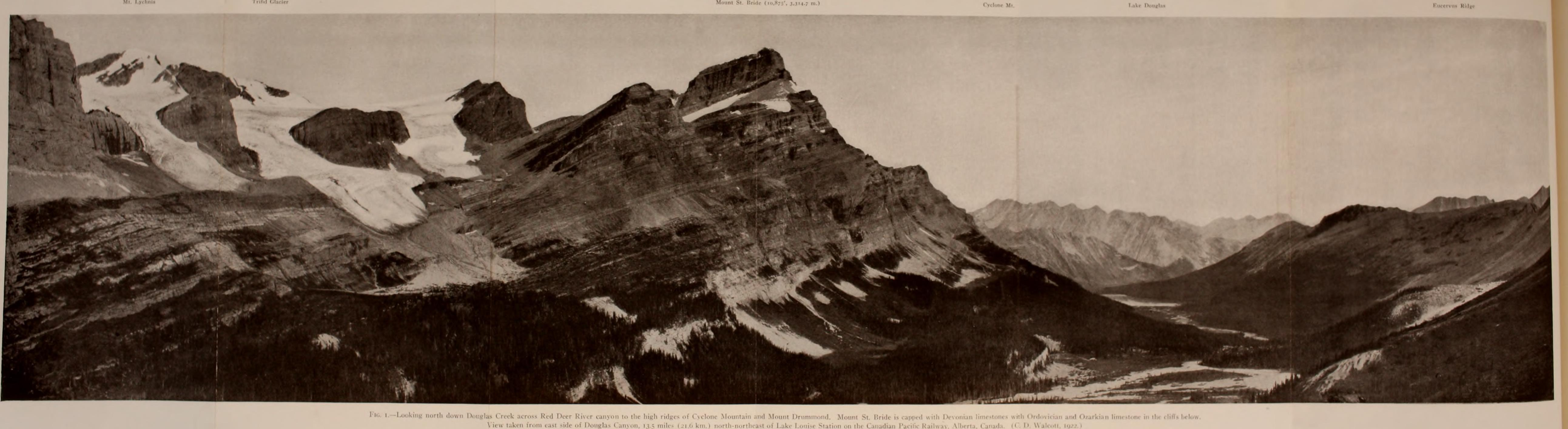
Mount St. Bride centered (1922)

== See also ==
- Geography of Alberta
- Geology of Alberta
