= Sawback Range =

Mountain range in Alberta, Canada

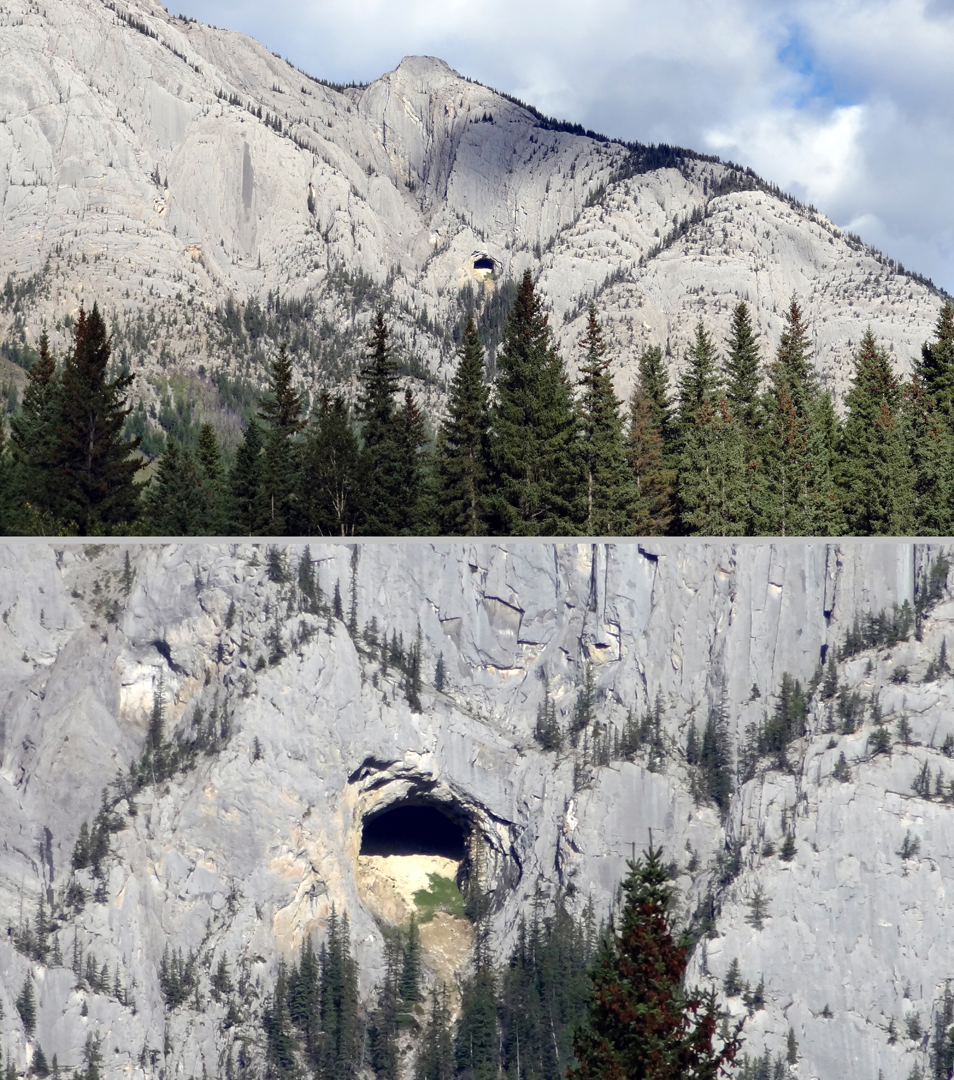
- The "Hole in the Wall" is a natural cave on the side of Mount Cory. It is visible from the Trans-Canada Highway.

Highest point
- Peak: Mount St. Bride
- Elevation: 3,315 m (10,876 ft)
- Coordinates: 51°30′28″N 115°57′19″W

Dimensions
- Length: 45 km (28 mi) N-S
- Width: 34 km (21 mi) E-W
- Area: 622 km^{2} (240 mi^{2})

Geography
- Location within Alberta
- Country: Canada
- Province: Alberta
- Range coordinates: 51°21′N 115°50′W
- Parent range: Canadian Rockies
- Topo map: NTS 82O5 Castle Mountain

The Sawback Range is a mountain range of the Canadian Rockies that stretches from the Bow Valley in Alberta into southeastern Banff National Park.

== List of Mountains ==
This range includes the following mountains and peaks:

Mountain / Peak	Elevation		Prominence		FA	Coordinates
Mountain / Peak	m	ft	m	ft	FA	Coordinates
Mount St. Bride	3,315	10,876	1,207	3,960	1910	51°30′28″N 115°57′19″W
Bonnet Peak	3,235	10,614	395	1,296	1914	51°26′3″N 115°53′6″W
Mount Avens	2,972	9,751	259	850	Unk	51°25′3″N 115°59′32″W
Protection Mountain	2,972	9,751	305	1,001	Unk	51°21′11″N 115°59′9″W
Mystic Peak	2,960	9,710	689	2,260	Unk	51°17′23.96″N 115°46′38.21″W
Block Mountain	2,935	9,629	284	932	Unk	51°22′38″N 115°50′59″W
Mount Ishbel	2,908	9,541	431	1,414	Unk	51°15′56″N 115°46′31″W
Mount Cory	2,802	9,193	262	860	Unk	51°12′3″N 115°41′23″W
Oyster Peak	2,777	9,111	186	610	1906	51°31′33″N 116°1′6″W
Cockscomb Mountain	2,776	9,108	220	720	Unk	51°14′12″N 115°43′30″W
Mount Louis	2,682	8,799	336	1,102	Unk	51°12′54″N 115°40′48″W
Mount Fifi	2,621	8,599	106	348	1921	51°13′19″N 115°41′26″W
Tilted Mountain	2,591	8,501	80	260	Unk	51°29′5″N 115°59′51″W
Mount Edith	2,554	8,379	192	630	1900	51°12′4″N 115°39′47″W
The Finger	2,545	8,350			Unk	51°13′12″N 115°44′9″W

== See also ==
- Ranges of the Canadian Rockies
