= Mount Cory (Alberta) =

Mountain in Alberta, Canada

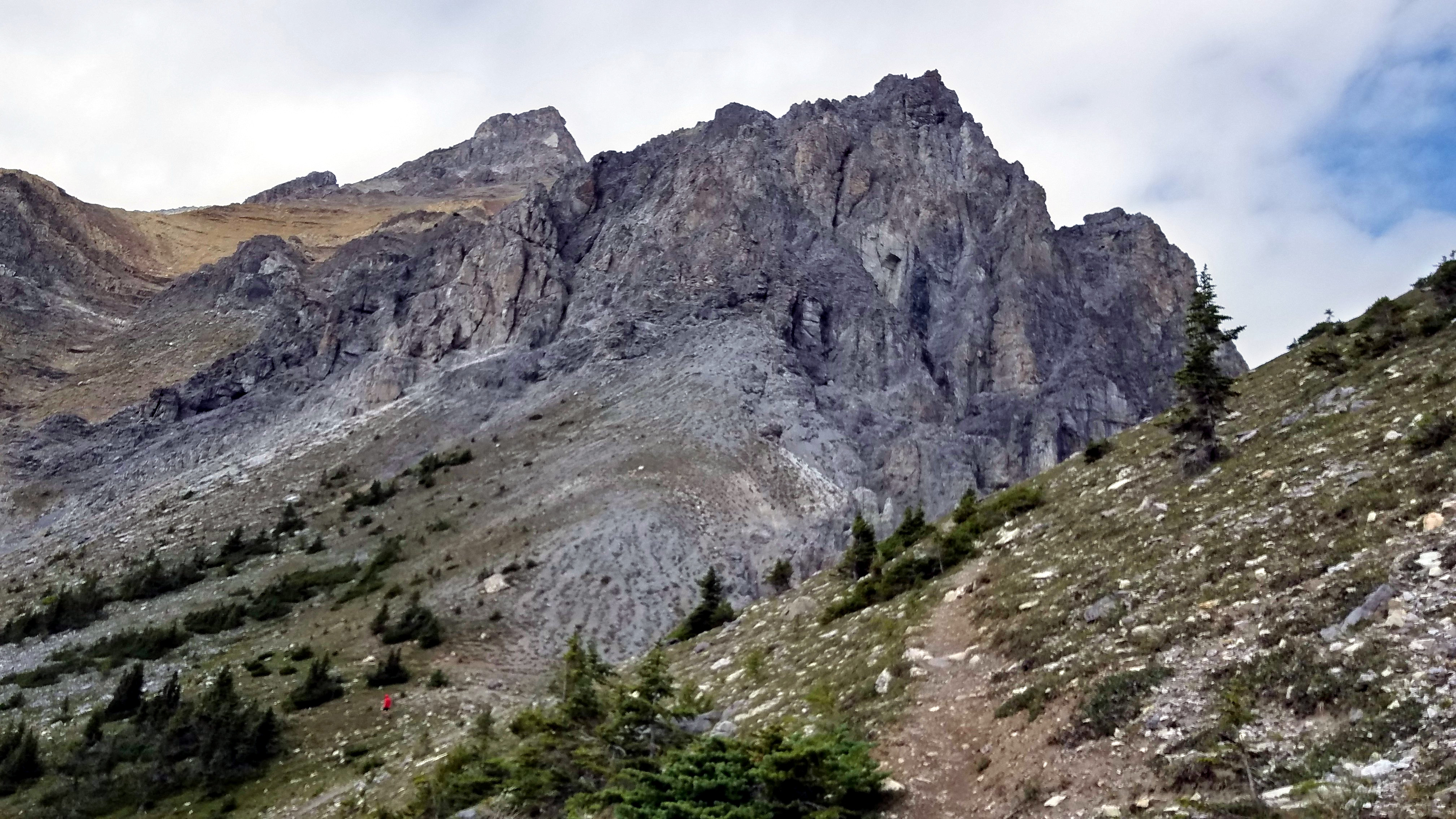

Highest point
- Elevation: 2,802 m (9,193 ft)
- Prominence: 287 m (942 ft)
- Parent peak: Mystic Peak
- Listing: Mountains of Alberta
- Coordinates: 51°12′03″N 115°41′23″W

Geography
- Location within Alberta
- Interactive map of Mount Cory
- Country: Canada
- Province: Alberta
- Protected area: Banff National Park
- Parent range: Sawback Range
- Topo map: NTS 82O4 Banff

Climbing
- Easiest route: Easy/Moderate Scramble

Mount Cory is a mountain located in the Bow River Valley in southeast Banff National Park, just north of Banff, Alberta, Canada. The mountain was named in 1923 after William Wallace Cory, deputy minister of the Interior from 1905 to 1930.

== The "Hole in the Wall" ==
The gaping "Hole in the Wall" cave is located in the upper portion of the western side of Mount Cory. The cave is a landmark easily viewed from the nearby Trans-Canada Highway. The formation is natural, despite the seemingly regular pentagonal shape of its entrance as seen from a distance. The cave is about 60 feet high and 100 feet deep and has often been visited by climbers.

== Climate ==
Based on the Köppen climate classification, Mount Cory is located in a subarctic climate zone with cold, snowy winters, and mild summers. Winter temperatures can drop below -20 °C with wind chill factors below -30 °C.

== Gallery ==
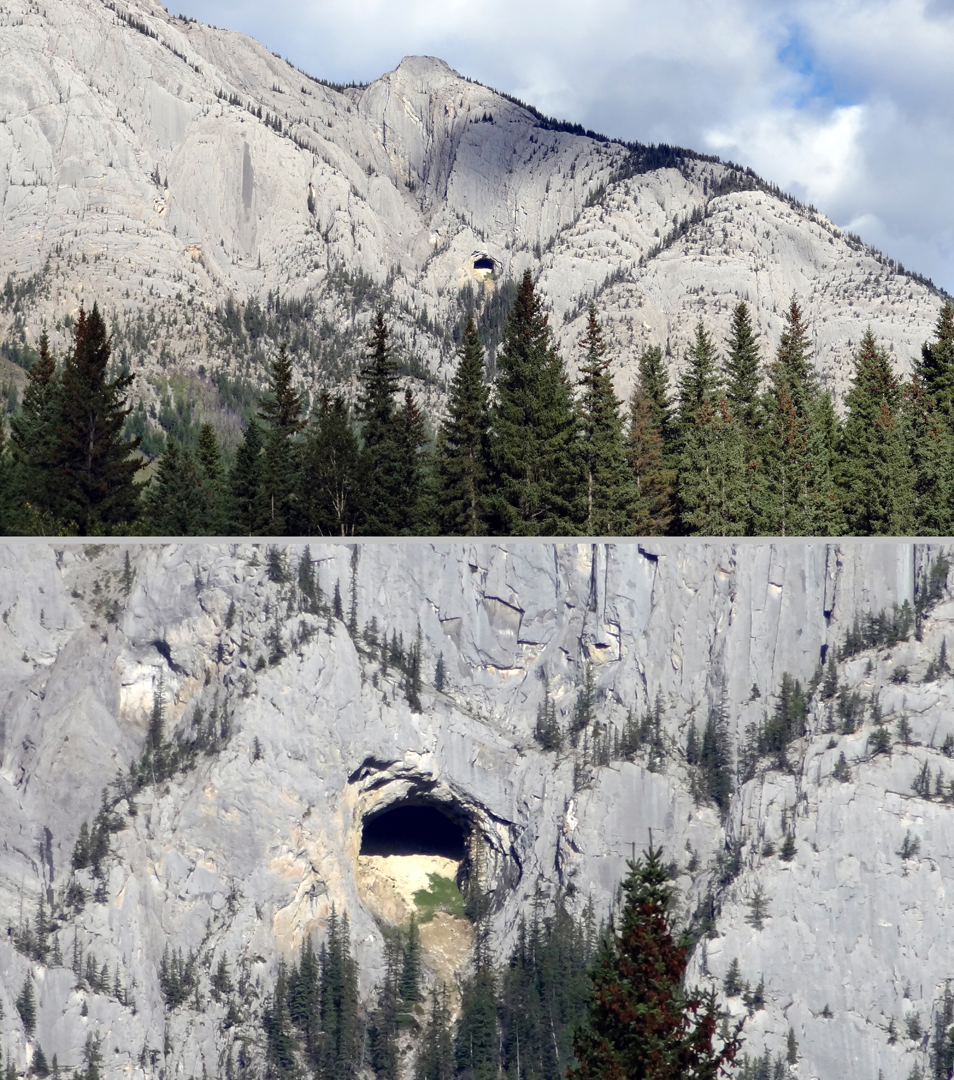
Mount Cory's "Hole in the Wall"

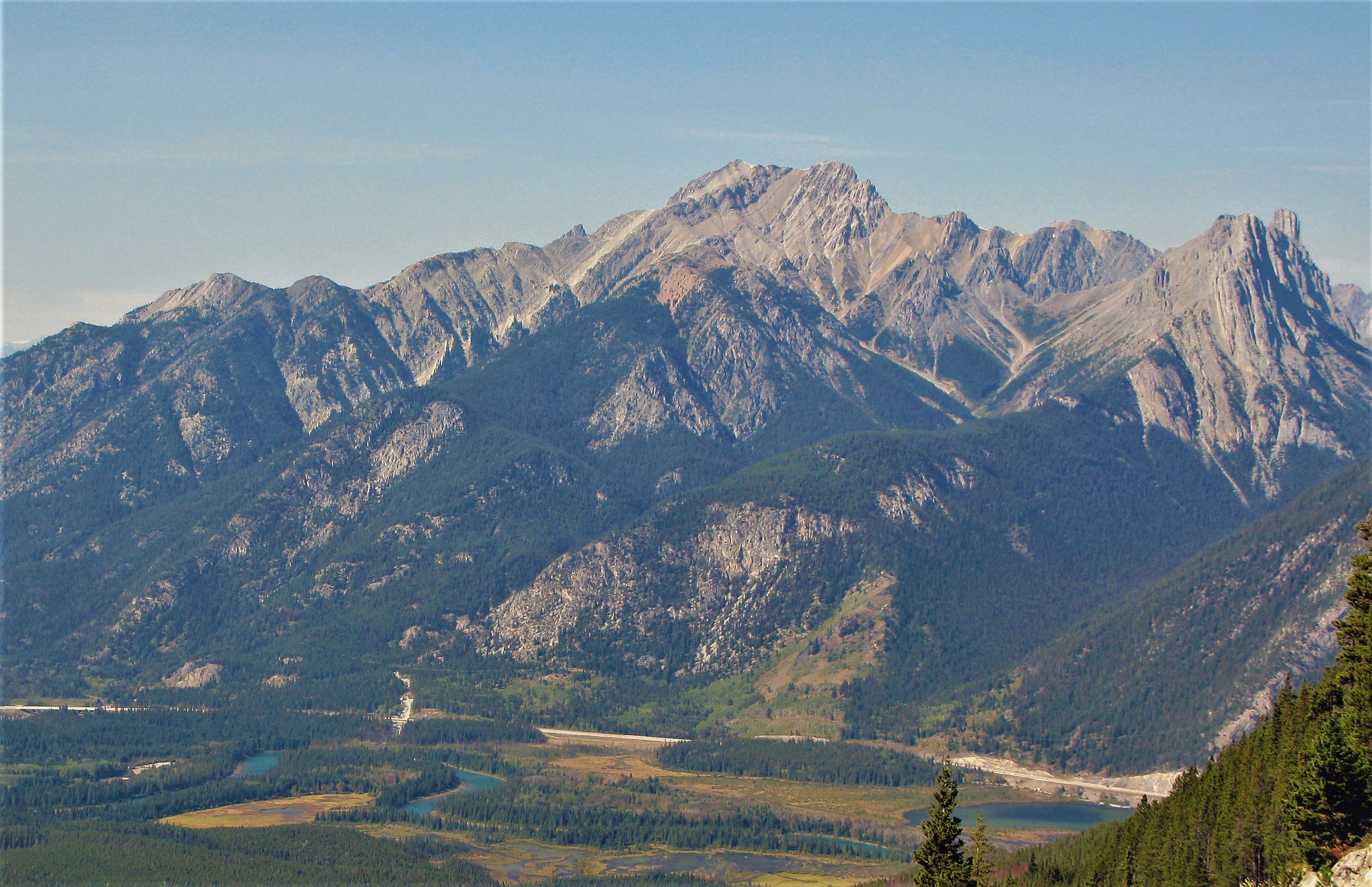
Southeast aspect of Mount Cory

== See also ==
- Geography of Alberta
