= Geology of Alberta =

The geology of Alberta encompasses parts of the Canadian Rockies and thick sedimentary sequences, bearing coal, oil and natural gas, atop complex Precambrian crystalline basement rock.

== Geologic history, stratigraphy and tectonics ==
The Precambrian granite and gneiss crystalline basement rocks beneath Alberta are extremely ancient, dating to the Archean and Proterozoic. The Slave Craton and Southern Alberta craton are the oldest units at more 2.5 billion years old, while younger units from the Proterozoic include the Wopmay orogeny, Great Slave Lake shear zone, Pre-Taltston basement, Taltson magmatic zone, Athabasca polymetamorphic terrane, Red Earth granulite domain, Kimiwan isotopic anomaly, Ksituan magmatic arc, Virgin River shear zone, Central Alberta intrusions and Lacombe domain. In many cases, Proterozoic deformation overprinted older Archean rocks. The Hudsonian Orogeny from 1.9 to 1.6 billion years ago was the last major regional metamorphic event.

=== Paleozoic (539-251 million years ago) ===
Throughout the late Precambrian and Paleozoic, a long-running marine transgression flooded western Alberta, accumulating sedimentary rocks on a basement of 1.8 billion year old Churchillian rocks.

=== Mesozoic (251-66 million years ago) ===
Carbonate deposition common in the Paleozoic ended during the Jurassic as the North American continent moved westward with the opening of the Atlantic Ocean. The Guichon Batholith emplaced 200 million years ago, near Ashcroft, British Columbia and was accompanied by a period of erosion that wore away Devonian, Mississippian and Triassic strata from east to west. The Late Jurassic Morrison Formation, known for its stockpiles of dinosaur bones formed as uplift in the Black Hills of western South Dakota shed sediments into Alberta. Advancing river deltas lay down the Kootenay Formation and Ferni basin in the Banff area, with offshore sands forming the Nikanassin Formation in Jasper further north. Until the Valanginian, marine conditions continued in Peace River arch and Keg River low, forming the Cretaceous Bullhead and Minnes groups.

With the uplift of the Rocky Mountains, erosion accelerated in Alberta stripping away up to 3,500 feet (1,100 meters) of the Kootenay Formation. Rivers flowing across British Columbia reversed course with debris blockage and deposited the Elk conglomerate atop the Kootenay Formation. Rivers shifted northward toward the Arctic Ocean, which transgressed southward, flooding much of Alberta in the Aptian. Fluvial coal swamps and deltas of the Blairmore and Manville groups formed along the edge of the ocean. These shorelines were important for coal and oil and gas formation.

The Blairmore Group reaches up to 2,500 feet (760 meters) thick, divided into the Gladstone Formation conglomerate, sandstone, green shale and non-marine red shale, the Beaver Mines Formation with shale and chlorite sandstone and the Mill Creek Formation with pyroclastic flow sediments, related to Mesozoic volcanism in the Canadian Rockies.

North of the Calgary-Banff highway, the Gladstone and Beaver Mines Formation become carbonaceous and coal-bearing. A significant unconformity separates the Blairmore Group from overlying rocks.

During the Cenomanian and Albian, the connection with the Arctic Ocean was nearly severed, creating the Mowry sea, which developed its own endemic group of ammonites. Fossils across western Canada with both exotic and endemic fish scales and ammonites indicates that the Gulf of Mexico flooded the area from the south. The sea filled with fine sediments of the Colorado Group concurrent with the deposition of clastic and volcanic sediments in the Mill Creek Formation. The Joli Fou shale and Viking (Bow Island) sand, plus lower Colorado Group shales cover the Blaimore Group in southern Alberta.

The Colorado Group (known locally as the Alberta Group) occupies the Cordilleran foothills with the 1700-foot thick Blackstone Formation near Nordegg, which holds silty and platy shales, together with the Cardium Formation marine sandstone and shales, and the Wapiabi Formation which reaches up to 2000 feet thick with mudstone, ironstone and ammonite fossils.

=== Cenozoic (66 million years ago-present) ===
During the Cenozoic sedimentation continued in the Western Canada Sedimentary Basin, spanning Alberta. The Paskapoo Formation deposited near the Rockies, together with the Ravenscrag Formation in the southern Cypress Hills Formation. The Paskapoo Formation reaches up to one kilometre thick and holds fossils of gliding mammals and early pangolins.
