= Castle Mountain =

Mountain in Alberta, Canada

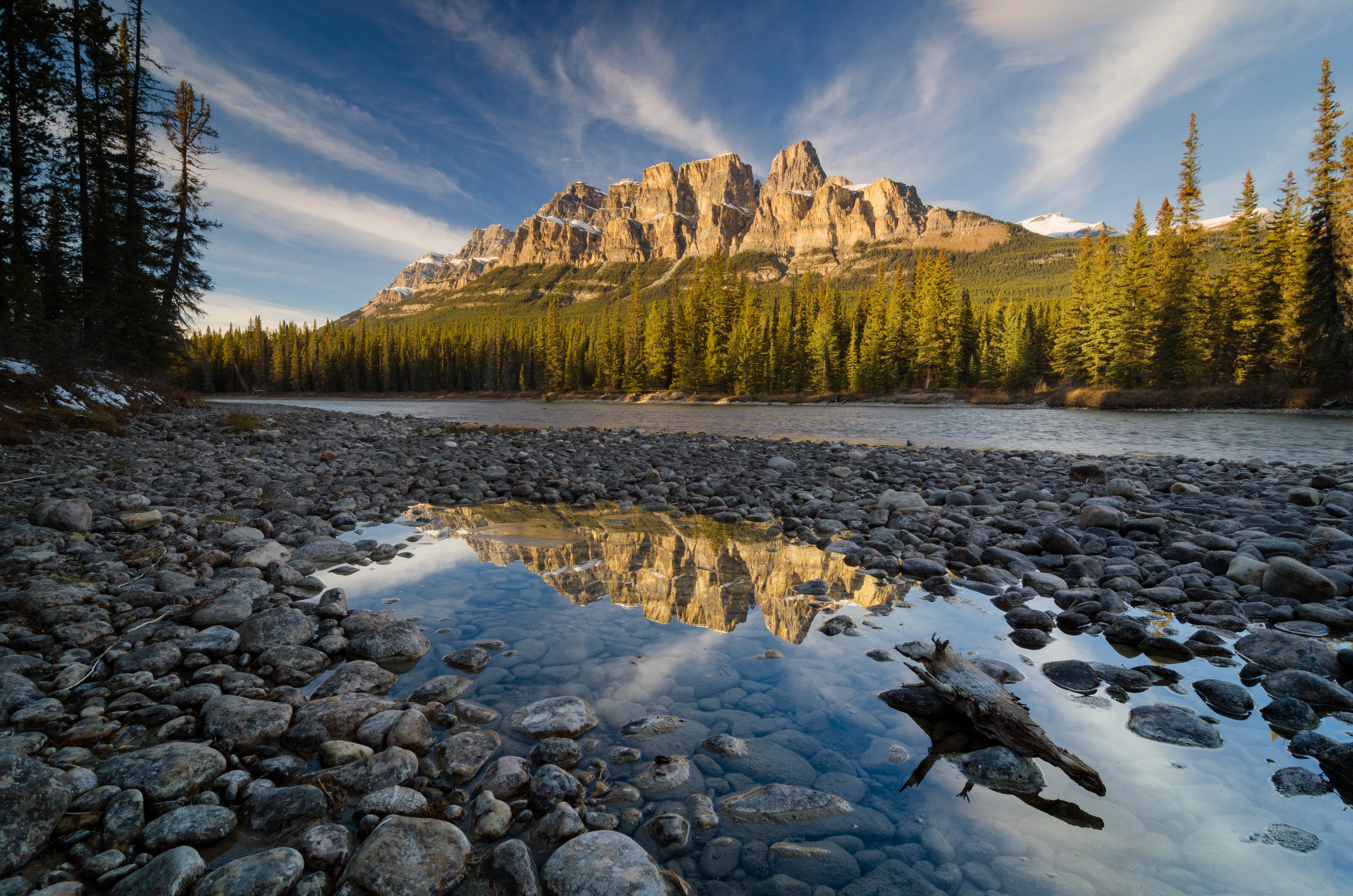
- Castle Mountain from the southwest; Bow River in foreground

Highest point
- Elevation: 2,766 m (9,075 ft)
- Prominence: 168 m (551 ft)
- Listing: Mountains of Alberta
- Coordinates: 51°17′59″N 115°55′21″W

Naming
- Native name: Miistukskoowa (Blackfoot)

Geography
- Location within Alberta
- Interactive map of Castle Mountain
- Country: Canada
- Province: Alberta
- Protected area: Banff National Park
- Parent range: Sawback Range (Canadian Rockies)
- Topo map: NTS 82O5 Castle Mountain

Climbing
- First ascent: 1884 by Arthur P. Coleman
- Easiest route: Moderate scramble (NE)

Castle Mountain (Blackfoot: Miistukskoowa) is a mountain located within Banff National Park in the Canadian Rockies, approximately halfway between Banff and Lake Louise. It is the easternmost mountain of the Main Ranges in the Bow Valley and sits astride the Castle Mountain Fault which has thrust older sedimentary and metamorphic rocks forming the upper part of the mountain over the younger rocks forming its base. The mountain's castellated, or castle-like, appearance is a result of erosive processes acting at different rates on the peak's alternating layers of softer shale and harder limestone, dolomite and quartzite.

The mountain was named in 1858 by James Hector for its castle-like appearance. From 1946 to 1979 it was known as Mount Eisenhower in honour of the World War II general Dwight D. Eisenhower. Public pressure caused its original name to be restored, but a pinnacle on the southeastern side of the mountain was named Eisenhower Tower. Located nearby are the remains of Silver City, a 19th-century mining settlement, and the Castle Mountain Internment Camp in which persons deemed enemy aliens and suspected enemy sympathizers were confined during World War I.

While looking nearly inaccessible from the Trans-Canada Highway, the peak can be ascended from the backside on the northeastern slopes. The trail to Rockbound Lake leads hikers around the eastern side. The massif contains several high points including Helena Ridge (2,862 m (9,390 ft)), Stuart Knob (2,850 m (9,350 ft)) and Television Peak (2,970 m (9,744 ft)), the latter being named for the TV repeater located on top. Technicians use a helicopter rather than hiking the long ascent to the top.

== Geology ==
Castle Mountain is the easternmost member of the Main Ranges in the Bow Valley. Passing through the mountain is the Castle Mountain Fault, a thrust fault which separates it and the other nearby peaks of the Main Ranges from the Sawback Range to the northeast, the westernmost of the Front Ranges in the region. Castle Mountain's upper sections, including its cliff faces, consist of late Pre-Cambrian and Cambrian age sedimentary rocks such as limestone and shale along with some metamorphic quartzite. Originally deposited in an ancient shallow sea, these deposits were later thrust over younger layers of late Paleozoic and Mesozoic age which now form the forested, gently sloping, base of Castle Mountain. It is an example of a castellated mountain in which erosion has sculpted a series of flat or gently sloping terraces composed of softer shale and sharp cliffs which reveal alternating layers of shale interspersed by harder layers of quartzite, dolomite and limestone.

== First Nations land claim ==
On January 25, 2017, the Government of Canada and the Siksika Nation announced an agreement to settle a land claim in the region of Castle Mountain, known as Miistukskoowa to the Siksika. The agreement ended an outstanding claim dating back to the 1880s when land located at Castle Mountain was set aside as a timber berth for the use and benefit of the First Nation. The basis of the claim was that these lands were wrongfully taken from the First Nation in 1908 without their consent and without proper compensation. In 1911, these lands at Castle Mountain were added to Rocky Mountain Park, now known as Banff National Park. The agreement provides the Siksika Nation with approximately $123 million in financial compensation, the option to purchase on the open market up to 17,491 acres of land outside of the boundaries of Banff National Park and apply to Canada to have the lands added to its reserve, economic opportunities inside Banff National Park, and ongoing park access for cultural, traditional and educational purposes. First Nation members voted to approve the settlement on March 4, 2016. Canada gave its final approval on August 15, 2016.

== History ==
James Hector, who accompanied the Palliser Expedition, encountered Castle Mountain in August 1858 while leading a side expedition to find the headwaters of the Bow River. He noted that it "...looks exactly like a gigantic castle" and named it Castle Mountain. He also made the first recorded ascent of its slopes, but is not believed to have reached its summit. The official journal of the Palliser Expedition records his ascent:

At 1,000 feet above the valley, before we had got quite out of the woods, we came to a cliff, about 80 feet high, composed of quartzite and indurated sandstone of a pinkish hue; the beds were nearly horizontal, and as they seem to continue so all the way to the top of the mountain, which is at least 3,000 feet higher, these quartzites must be the lowest beds I saw. [...] Above the point is a grassy slope, having an inclination of 33°, and so slippery that it was only with great trouble that we got over it; it would seem to indicate the occurrence of some soft beds that have weathered into the slope. After this we reached the first of the cliff ranges that are so conspicuous from the valley below; it was composed of quartzite, passing into a conglomerate of pebbles of milk quartz and other rocks. When 2,000 feet above the valley we passed round to the N[orth] side of the mountain, and found that a deep valley separated it from a lower spur composed of splintery shale of a dull red colour. The mass of the mountain, which yet rose more than 2,000 feet above us, seemed to be composed of thick-bedded limestones, and these breaking away as the soft shales below them have been destroyed has given rise to the castellated appearance.

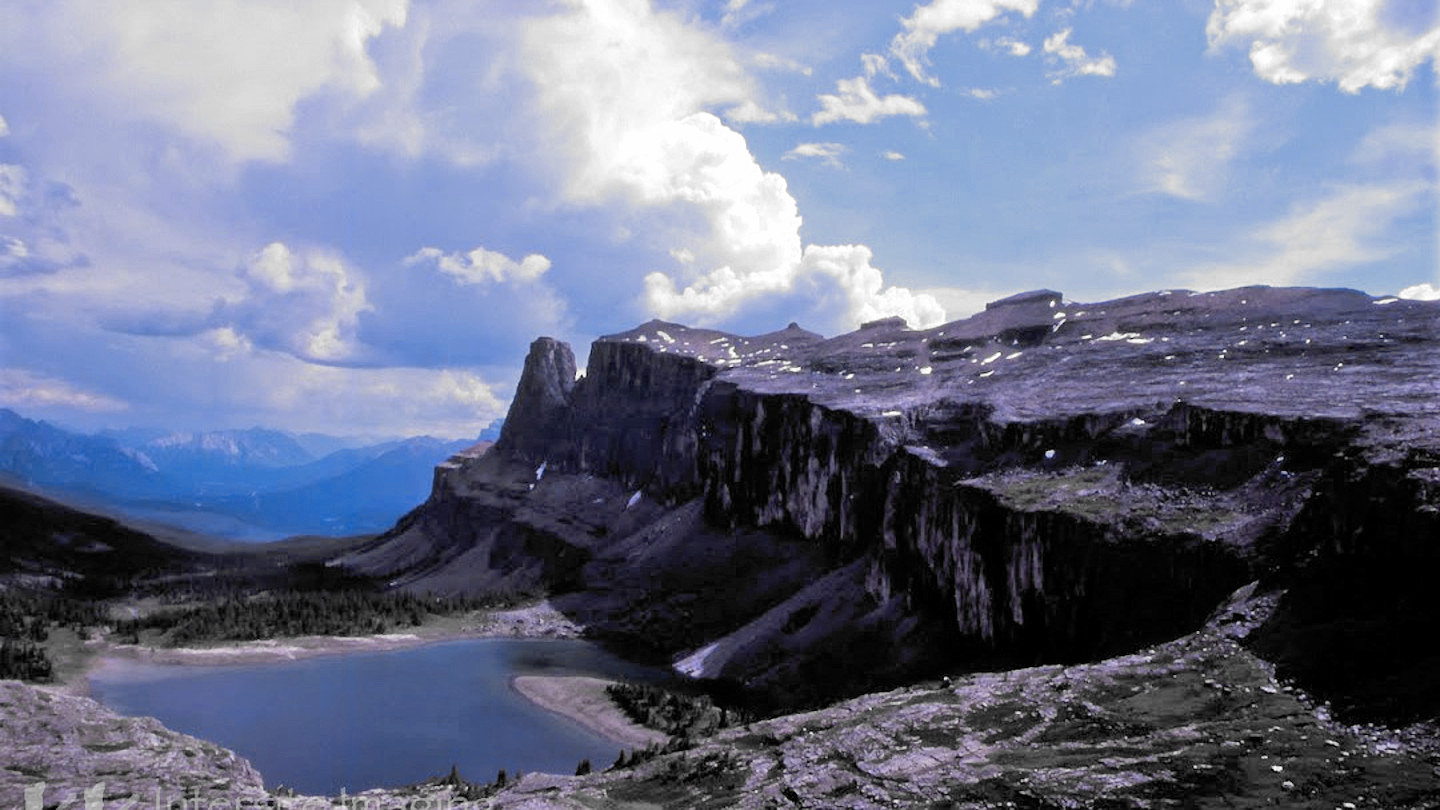
Castle Mountain above Rockbound Lake

The first known climber to reach the top of Castle Mountain was Arthur P. Coleman, a professor at the University of Toronto, in 1884. Lawrence Grassi and P. Cerutti, both from Canmore, were the first to climb Eisenhower Tower in 1926.

In 1881, Joe Healy received some ore in trade from an Indigenous person which was discovered to contain a relatively high silver content. The following year he settled at Castle Mountain as a prospector. News of Healy's ore soon spread; others began to arrive and the settlement of Silver City, situated near Castle Mountain, quickly developed. It was already thriving when the Canadian Pacific transcontinental railroad was built through the area in 1884. Over three thousand people lived there at its height, but it was almost entirely abandoned in 1885 because the mines failed to yield a significant profit.

Situated nearby is Castle Mountain Internment Camp, a First World War internment camp where Ukrainian immigrants to Canada were confined. Life in the camps was often described as 'grim'; with its isolated location far from the roads of the time, the Castle Mountain camp was an ideal place to confine 'enemy aliens' and 'suspected enemy sympathisers'. The forced labour of these men helped build much of the infrastructure of Banff National Park. Internees were held at the Cave & Basin site during the winter months.

Construction began in 1910 at Castle Junction on a highway connecting British Columbia to Calgary that would, upon its completion in the early 1920s, make Castle Mountain more accessible to climbers, hikers and other tourists.

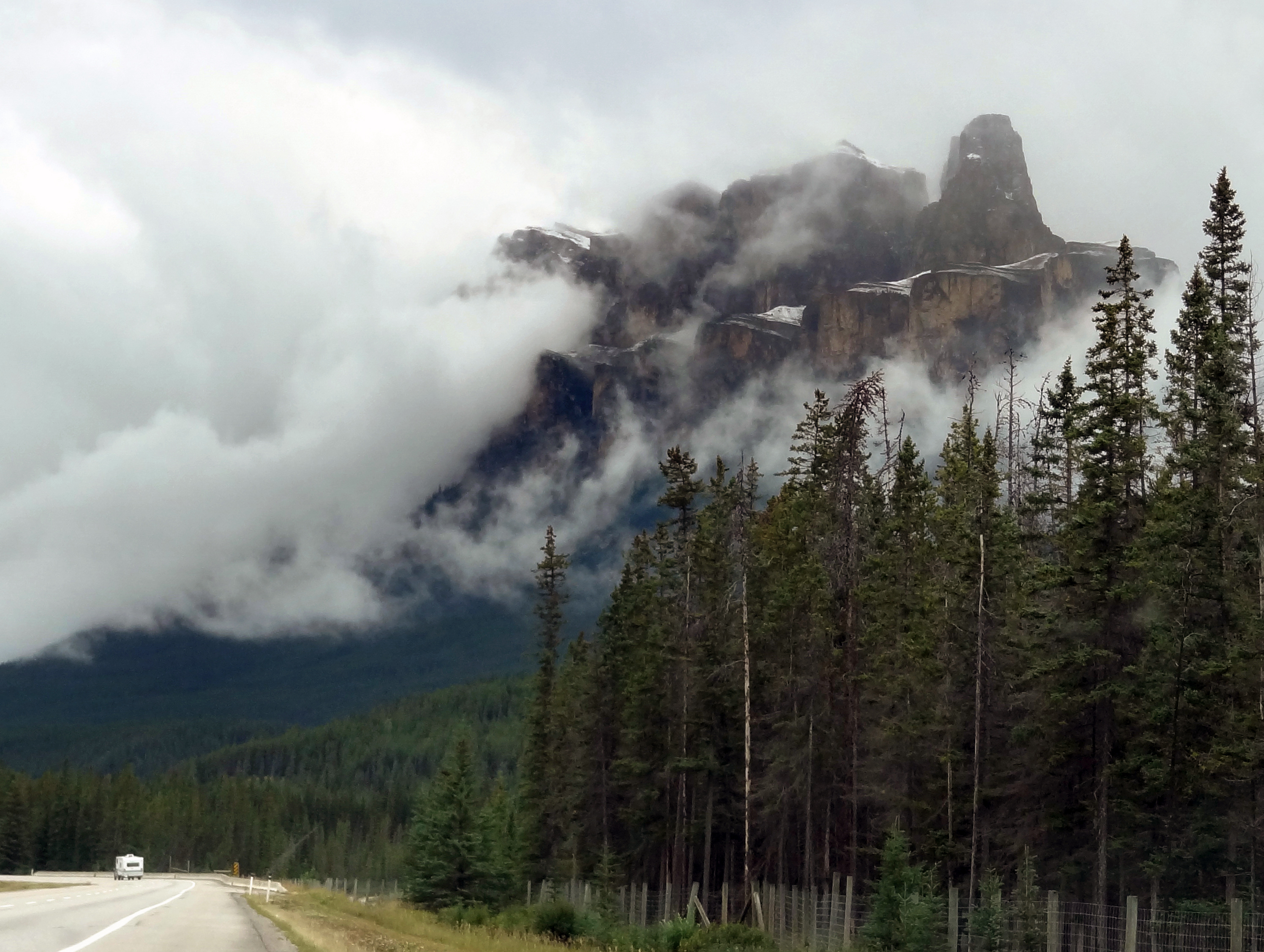
Castle Mountain's Eisenhower Tower rises from the mist above the Trans-Canada Highway.

At a meeting of the Ottawa Canadian Club in January 1946 at which World War II general Dwight D. Eisenhower was a guest speaker, Prime Minister Mackenzie King renamed Castle Mountain in his honour. Alluding to Scotland's recent gift to Eisenhower of a castle, King said, "We haven't any ancient castles, but we have something more enduring, we have ancient mountains ... we have a mountain named Castle and we have thought that to change the name to Mount Eisenhower we would pay a tribute in the form of permanency expressing our admiration years after the castle in Scotland has completely disappeared." Immediate reaction was mixed; many Banff residents approved, but a telegram sent to King in the name of "members of the ski clubs and climbing clubs of the Rocky Mountains" protested the "inappropriate name of Eisenhower Peak". By the 1970s, increasing displeasure at the new name was being voiced by Banff area residents through petitions submitted to the Alberta Heritage Sites Board for the restoration of the original name. A change of name was already planned by 1976, but its implementation was delayed to avoid causing offense on account of the United States Bicentennial commemorations taking place that year. The mountain was officially renamed Castle Mountain in 1979, but an isolated pinnacle at the southeastern end was designated Eisenhower Tower.

== Scramble route ==
While the peak presents a formidable challenge to climb when viewed from the highway, the mountain can be ascended by first hiking to Rockbound Lake which is located on the easier backside. A break in a cliff band provides access to a route above the lake. The ascent is a very long day when undertaken from the trailhead and can easily require 12 hours for a return trip. This cannot be shortened as random backcountry camping is not permitted in the area. The Castle Mountain Hut on the southern side could be used but requires technical rock climbing skills and possibly a rope to access it. While the normal scrambling route reached via Rockbound Lake is primarily a long slog, there is no discernible trail once one reaches the top of the "big hill" overlooking the lake and requires moderate scrambling abilities and a bit of route finding to ascend the gully leading to the upper bench. If pressed for time or a different objective, Helena Ridge is basically a scree slog straight up although a lingering snowfield in the gully above the big hill may provide some relief. Snow patches often linger on the upper routes even in late summer so an ice axe should be considered.

== Climbing routes ==
There are numerous rock climbing routes available on the mountain, the most common routes being:

- Bass Buttress
- Brewer Buttress
- Ultra Brewers
- Eisenhower Tower
