= Revenant Mountain =

Mountain in Alberta, Canada

- Location within Alberta

Highest point
- Elevation: 3,065 m (10,056 ft)
- Prominence: 725 m (2,379 ft)
- Parent peak: Puma Peak (3120 m)
- Listing: Mountains of Alberta
- Coordinates: 51°22′24″N 115°28′46″W

Geography
- Country: Canada
- Province: Alberta
- Protected areas: Banff National Park; Ghost River Wilderness Area
- Parent range: Palliser Range
- Topo map: NTS 82O6 Lake Minnewanka

Climbing
- First ascent: 1968 T.A. Swaddle, M. Benn, T. Sornenson

Revenant Mountain is a 3,065-metre (10,056-foot) mountain summit located in southwestern Alberta, Canada. The peak is located in the Palliser Range. It was named in 1963 to follow the "ghost like" theme of other land features in the area including Apparition Mountain and Ghost River.

== See also ==
- List of mountains in the Canadian Rockies
- Geography of Alberta
