= Siffleur =

Siffleur (French, 'whistler') may refer to:

- Siffleur (professional whistler),
- Siffleur River, rising in the Canadian Rockies
  - Siffleur Falls
- Siffleur Mountain, in Alberta, Canada
  - Siffleur Wilderness Area

== See also ==
- Rufous-throated solitaire, known in Dominica as siffleur montagne
- Siffleuse (1890–1908), a British Thoroughbred racehorse
- "Siffler sur la colline" ('Whistle on the hill') is a 1968 song by Joe Dassin
