= Mount Peskett =

Mountain in the country of Canada

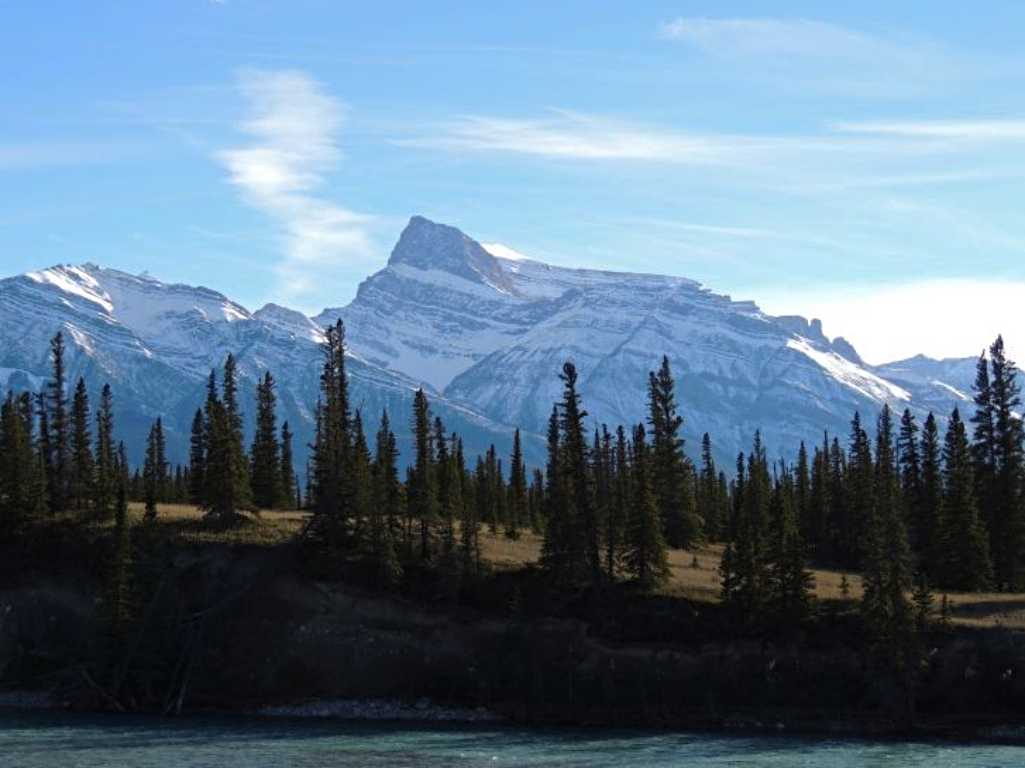
- Mount Peskett

Highest point
- Elevation: 3,124 m (10,249 ft)
- Prominence: 122 m (400 ft)
- Parent peak: Mount Loudon (3221 m)
- Listing: Mountains of Alberta
- Coordinates: 51°56′52″N 116°27′25″W

Geography
- Location within Alberta Location within Canada
- Location: Alberta, Canada
- Parent range: Murchison Group; Canadian Rockies
- Topo map: NTS 82N16 Siffleur River

Geology
- Rock type: Sedimentary

Climbing
- First ascent: 1970 Leo Grillmair, W.L. Putman, D. Von Hennig
- Easiest route: Scramble

Mount Peskett is a 3,124-metre (10,249-foot) mountain summit located in the North Saskatchewan River valley of Alberta, Canada. Mount Peskett is situated in the Canadian Rockies on the northern boundary the Siffleur Wilderness Area. Its nearest higher peaks are Mount Loudon, 3.7 km (2.3 mi) to the south, and Siffleur Mountain 3.7 km to the southeast. Mount Peskett can be seen from Highway 11, the David Thompson Highway. Precipitation runoff from the mountain flows north via Loudon Creek and Spreading Creek which are both tributaries of the North Saskatchewan River.

== History ==
The peak was named by Len Siemens in 1968 after Reverend Louis W. Peskett (1931-1966), a director of Youth for Christ who was killed by a falling rock in the vicinity of nearby Mount Cline.

The mountain's name became official in 1968 when approved by the Geographical Names Board of Canada.

The first ascent was made in 1970 by Leo Grillmair, W.L. Putman, and D. Von Hennig.

== Geology ==
Mount Peskett is composed of sedimentary rock laid down from the Precambrian to Jurassic periods that was pushed east and over the top of younger rock during the Laramide orogeny.

== Climate ==
Based on the Köppen climate classification, Mount Peskett is located in a subarctic climate with cold, snowy winters, and mild summers. Temperatures can drop below -20 °C with wind chill factors below -30 °C.

== See also ==
- List of mountains in the Canadian Rockies
- Geography of Alberta
- Geology of the Rocky Mountains
