= Mount Loudon =

Mountain in the country of Canada

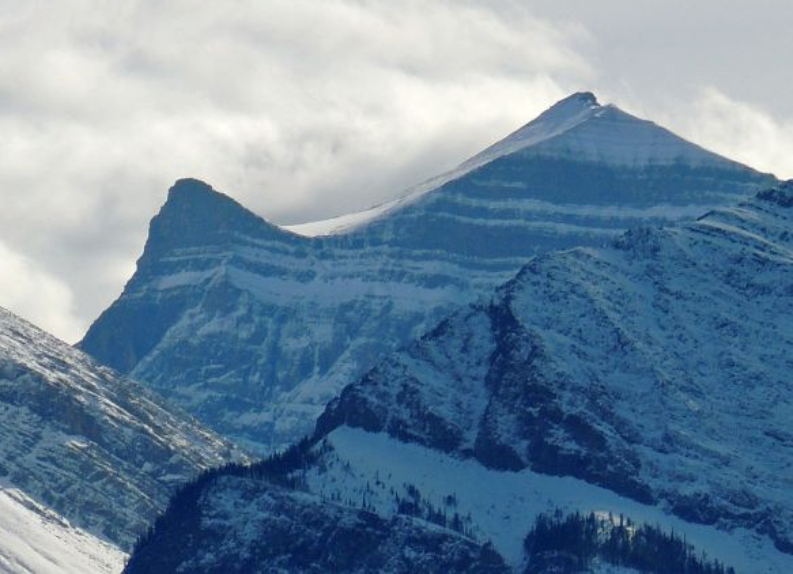
- Mount Loudon

Highest point
- Elevation: 3,221 m (10,568 ft)
- Prominence: 767 m (2,516 ft)
- Parent peak: Mount Murchison (3353 m)
- Listing: Mountains of Alberta
- Coordinates: 51°54′58″N 116°26′43″W

Geography
- Location within Alberta Location within Canada
- Location: Alberta, Canada
- Parent range: Murchison Group; Canadian Rockies
- Topo map: NTS 82N16 Siffleur River

Geology
- Rock age: Cambrian
- Rock type: Sedimentary

Climbing
- First ascent: 1972 A. Ridley, A. Daffern

Mount Loudon is a 3,221-metre (10,568 ft) mountain summit located in the North Saskatchewan River valley of Alberta, Canada. Mount Loudon is situated in the Siffleur Wilderness Area of the Canadian Rockies. Its nearest higher peak is Mount Murchison, 15 km (9.3 mi) to the west. Siffleur Mountain is located immediately northeast, and Mount Peskett immediately north. Mount Loudon can be seen from Highway 11, the David Thompson Highway. Precipitation runoff from the mountain flows north via Loudon Creek and Porcupine Creek, which are both tributaries of the North Saskatchewan River.

== History ==
The peak was named by Morrison P. Bridgland for William James Loudon (1860-1951), who was a geologist and professor at the University of Toronto. Bridgland (1878-1948) was a Dominion Land Surveyor who named many peaks in the Canadian Rockies and would have known Professor Loudon while he was studying at the University of Toronto. William James Loudon was the nephew of James Loudon (1841-1916), who was the President of the University of Toronto.

The mountain's name became official in 1957 when approved by the Geographical Names Board of Canada.

The first ascent of the peak was made in 1972 by Ann Ridley and Tony Daffern.

== Geology ==
Mount Loudon is composed of sedimentary rock laid down from the Precambrian to Jurassic periods that was pushed east and over the top of younger rock during the Laramide orogeny.

== Climate ==
Based on the Köppen climate classification, Mount Loudon is located in a subarctic climate with cold, snowy winters, and mild summers. Temperatures can drop below -20 °C, with wind chill factors below -30 °C.

== See also ==
- List of mountains of Canada
- Geography of Alberta
- Geology of the Rocky Mountains
