= White Goat Wilderness Area =

Protected natural area in Alberta, Canada

- IUCN category Ia (strict nature reserve)
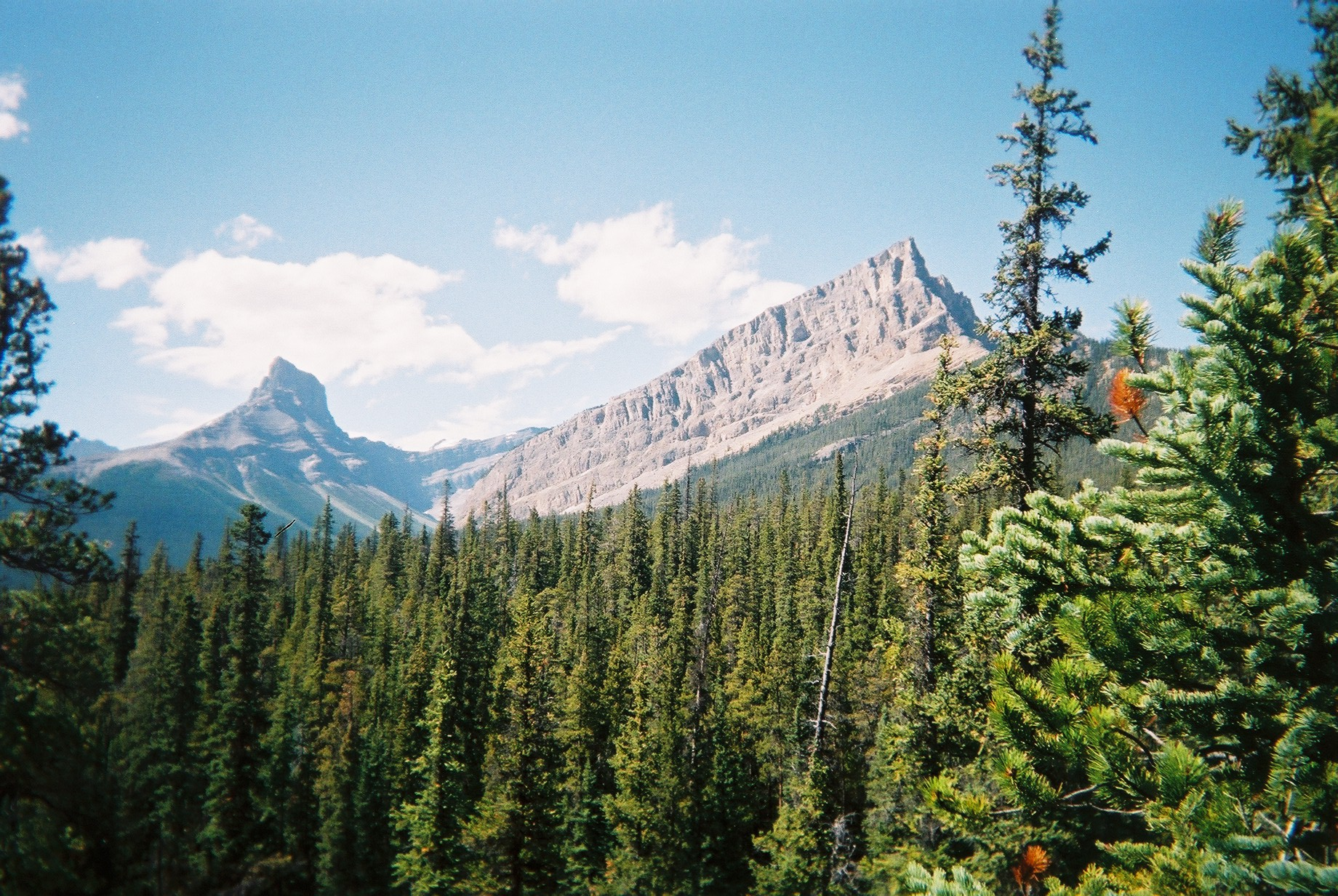
- White Goat Wilderness Area

- Location within Alberta
- Coordinates: 52°15′46″N 116°50′51″W
- Area: 44,457.14 ha (171.6500 sq mi)
- Established: 1961
- Governing body: Alberta Tourism, Parks and Recreation
- Website: www.albertaparks.ca/aboutparks.aspx

The White Goat Wilderness Area is a provincially designated wilderness area in the Canadian Rockies of Alberta. It was established in 1961 and it, as one of the three wilderness areas of Alberta, has the strictest form of government protection available in Canada. All development is forbidden and only travel by foot is permitted. Hunting and fishing are not allowed. The other two wilderness areas are Ghost River Wilderness Area and Siffleur Wilderness Area and together the three areas total 249,548.80 acres (100,988.82 ha).

White Goat is located near the west end and north side of Canadian Highway 11 and slightly north of the Siffleur Wilderness area. It is near the north end of Banff National Park, the south end of Jasper National Park, and east of the Columbia Icefield. Mountains rise to over 3,300 metres (10,800 ft). The area has rugged mountains, glacier-carved valleys, mountain lakes, waterfalls, and alpine meadows. There are two distinct vegetation zones. Above 2,100 metres (6,900 ft), the tree line, are grasses, sedges and wildflowers. Below that are spruce, fir, and lodgepole pine. Animals in the lower regions include woodland caribou, western moose, Rocky Mountain elk, white-tailed deer, mule deer, grizzly bear, black bear, cougar, coyote, northern Rocky Mountain wolf, and wolverine. Animals in the upper regions include golden-mantled ground squirrels, bighorn sheep, mountain goat, hoary marmot, pika, white-tailed ptarmigan, grey-crowned rosy finch, water pipit and horned lark. Eagles are seen in both the lower and upper regions.
