= Palliser Range =

Subrange of the Front Ranges in Alberta, Canada

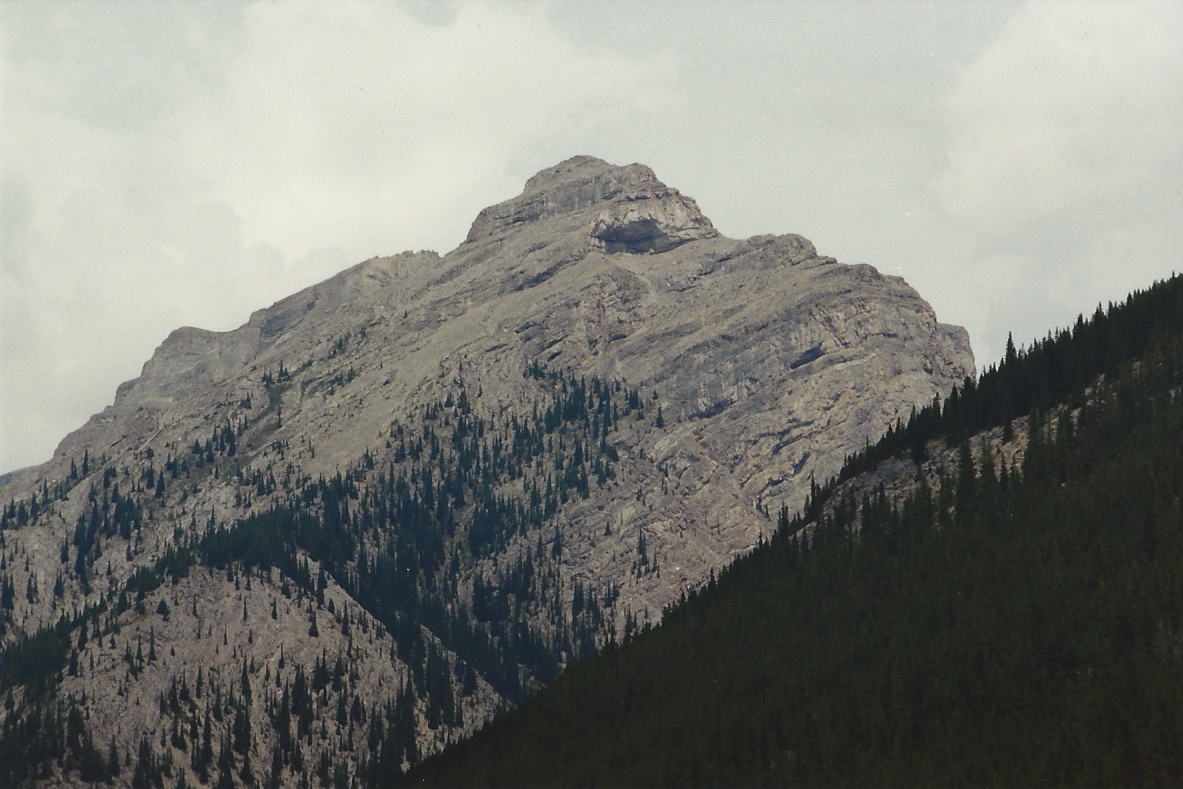
- Mount Aylmer, August 1994

Highest point
- Peak: Mount Aylmer
- Elevation: 3,162 m (10,374 ft)
- Listing: Mountains of Alberta

Geography
- Location within Alberta Location within Canada
- Location: Banff National Park; Alberta, Canada
- Range coordinates: 51°23′N 115°34′W
- Parent range: Canadian Rockies
- Borders on: Bare Range
- Topo map: NTS 82O5 Castle Mountain

The Palliser Range is a mountain range of the Canadian Rockies that lies in the extreme southeast corner of Banff National Park, Alberta, Canada.

The Palliser Range is part of the East Banff Ranges of the Central Front Canadian Rockies.

Lake Minnewanka marks the southern boundary of the range while the Bare Range marks the northern boundary. Its eastern reaches are marked by the Black Rock Mountain of the Ghost River Area. The range was named by the Palliser expedition as it appears on one of the maps produced by the expedition. The range gives the name to the Palliser Formation, a stratigraphical unit prominently featured in the mountains of this range.

== List of mountains ==
This range includes the following mountains and peaks:

| Mountain / Peak | Elevation | | Prominence | | Coordinates |
| Mountain / Peak | m | ft | m | ft | Coordinates |
|---|---|---|---|---|---|
| Mount Aylmer | 3,162 | 10,374 | 1,142 | 3,747 | 51°19′26″N 115°26′0″W |
| Puma Peak | 3,120 | 10,240 | 819 | 2,687 | 51°27′36″N 115°37′0″W |
| Revenant Mountain | 3,065 | 10,056 | 725 | 2,379 | 51°22′24″N 115°28′46″W |
| Apparition Mountain | 3,002 | 9,849 | 182 | 597 | 51°22′2″N 115°27′32″W |
| Mount Astley | 2,869 | 9,413 | | | 51°18′0″N 115°29′9″W |

== See also ==
- Ranges of the Canadian Rockies
