= Ghost Lake =

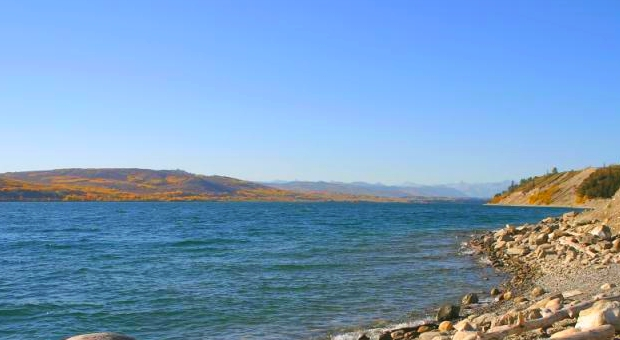
- Ghost Lake seen in early autumn

- Location within Alberta
- Location: Bighorn No. 8 / Rocky View County, Alberta
- Coordinates: 51°12′09″N 114°45′24″W
- Type: reservoir
- Primary inflows: Bow River, Ghost River
- Primary outflows: Bow River
- Catchment area: 6,460 km^{2} (2,490 sq mi)
- Basin countries: Canada
- Max. length: 13.5 km (8.4 mi)
- Max. width: 1.4 km (0.87 mi)
- Surface area: 11.6 km^{2} (4.5 sq mi)
- Average depth: 14.5 m (48 ft)
- Max. depth: 34 m (112 ft)
- Shore length^{1}: 32 km (20 mi)
- Surface elevation: 1,188 m (3,898 ft)
- Settlements: Cochrane, Alberta
- ^{1} Shore length is not a well-defined measure.

Ghost Lake is a reservoir in Western Alberta, Canada, formed along the Bow River. It is located approximately 45 km (28 mi) west of the city of Calgary and immediately west of Cochrane. It has a water surface of 11.6 km^{2} (4.5 sq mi) and a drainage basin of 6,460 km^{2} (2,490 sq mi) The average depth of the lake is 14.5 m (48 ft), and it reaches a maximum of 34 m (112 ft)

The lake lies in the foothills of the Rocky Mountains at an elevation of 1,188 m (3,898 ft) and is lined on the north shore by Highway 1A. Trans-Canada Highway passes a short distance to the south. It was formed in 1929 with the completion of the Ghost Dam, and was developed on land leased from the Nakoda first nations by Calgary Power Ltd. The lake and dam are primarily used for power generation. The Ghost plant generates an average of 173,000 megawatt hours each year. Calgary Power changed its name to TransAlta Utilities in 1981.

The lake freezes in December until approximately mid-May. Sport fish include lake trout, mountain whitefish, lake whitefish and brown trout.

Large fluctuations in water level due to power generation affect the recreational opportunities and biological productivity of the lake. The volume of water being released from the lake and the variance thereof also affect the Bow River downstream of the dam.

The location brings consistent, strong winds, which make the lake suitable for sailing and iceboating. The Ghost Lake Iceboat Club is located at Ghost Lake. Ghost Lake was also selected as the swimming venue for the inaugural Ironman Calgary 70.3. The summer village of Ghost Lake is located on the northern shore of the lake, about 3 km (1.9 mi) upstream from the dam. Only the Ghost Reservoir Provincial Recreation Area between the mouth of the Ghost River and the northeastern end of the lake, right next to the dam, provides public access to the lake.

== Gallery ==
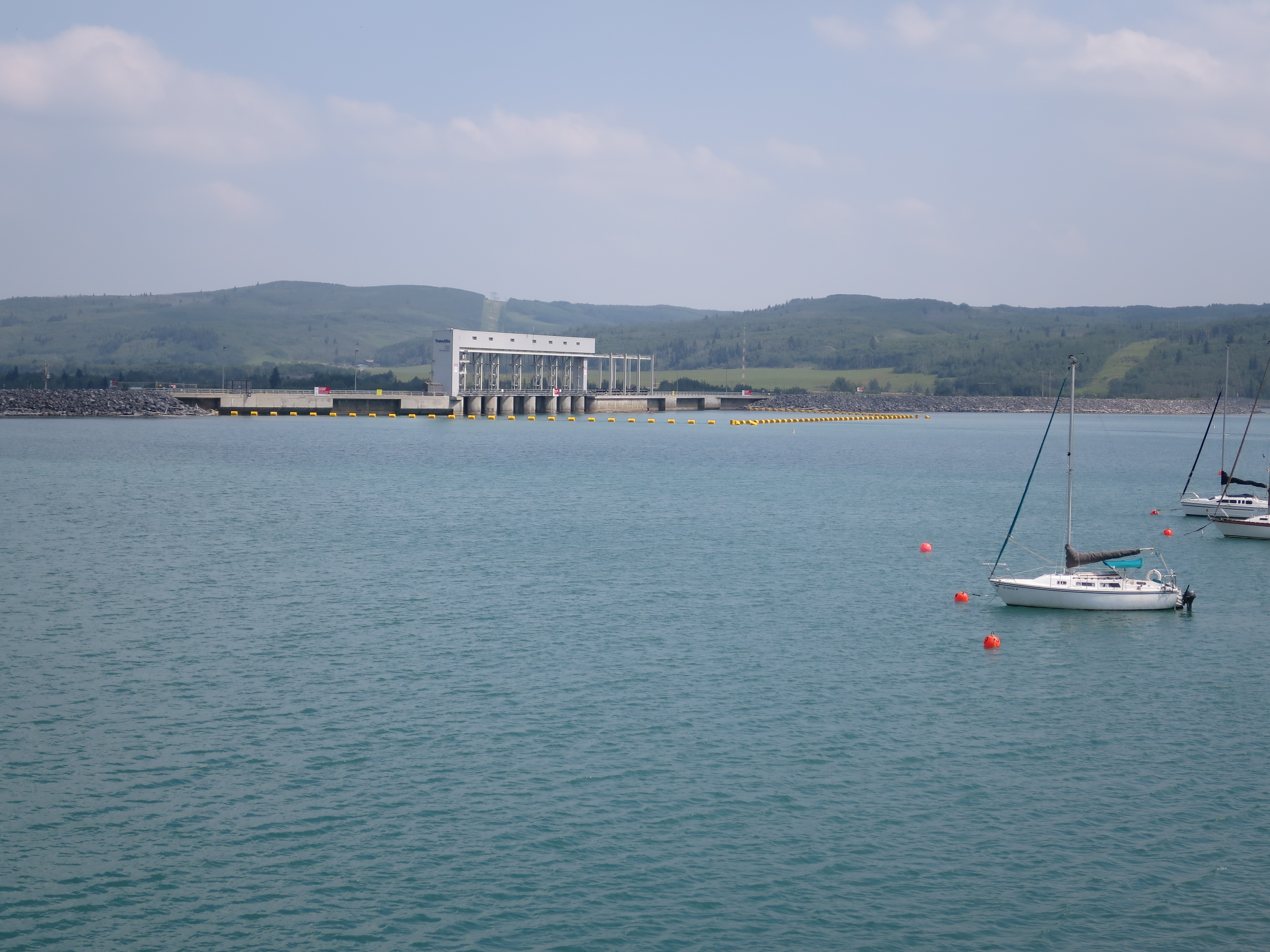
Ghost Reservoir Dam seen from the Ghost Reservoir Provincial Recreation Area

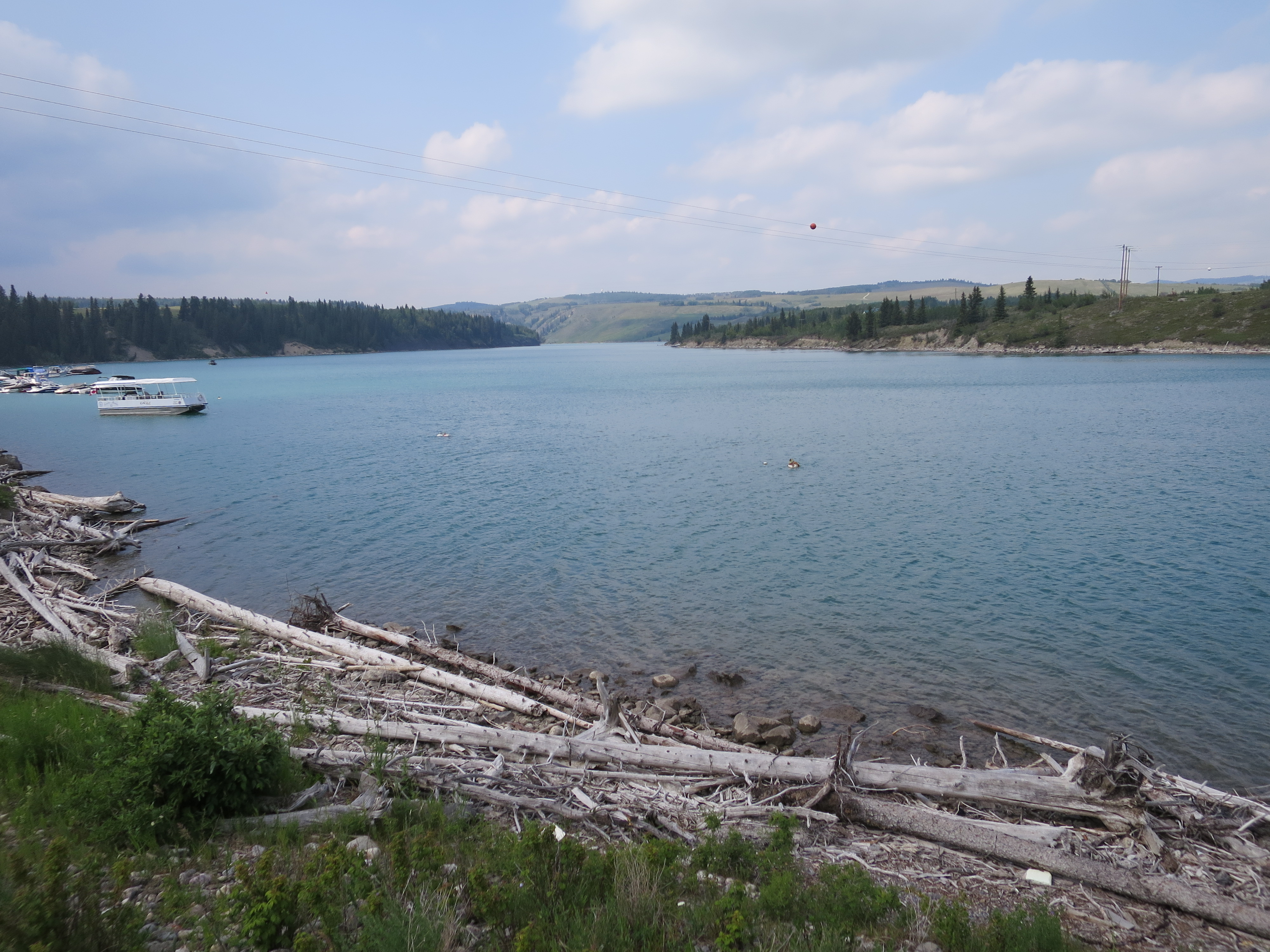
North arm of the reservoir, looking north towards the mouth of the Ghost River
