= Puma Peak =

Mountain in Alberta, Canada

- Location within Alberta

Highest point
- Elevation: 3,120 m (10,240 ft)
- Prominence: 819 m (2,687 ft)
- Parent peak: Mount Aylmer (3162 m)
- Listing: Mountains of Alberta
- Coordinates: 51°27′36″N 115°37′00″W

Geography
- Country: Canada
- Province: Alberta
- Parent range: Palliser Range
- Topo map: NTS 82O5 Castle Mountain

Climbing
- First ascent: 1986

Puma Peak is the unofficial name of a mountain located in Alberta, Canada. It is the second tallest mountain in the Palliser Range of the Canadian Rockies.

== See also ==
- List of mountains in the Canadian Rockies
- Geography of Alberta
