= William James Loudon =

Canadian geologist

William James Loudon (June 25, 1860 – September 27, 1951) was a Canadian geologist and amateur photographer in Ontario.

Mount Loudon (10, 568 ft./3,221 m) in Banff National Park, Alberta is named in his honour.
