= Apparition Mountain =

Mountain in Alberta, Canada

- Location within Alberta

Highest point
- Elevation: 3,002 m (9,849 ft)
- Prominence: 182 m (597 ft)
- Listing: List of mountains of Alberta
- Coordinates: 51°22′02″N 115°27′31″W

Geography
- Location: Alberta, Canada
- Parent range: Palliser Range
- Topo map: NTS 82O6 Lake Minnewanka

Apparition Mountain is a mountain located in the Palliser Range of Alberta, Canada. Named in 1963 by T.W. Swaddle, he felt that the name was suitable given other local land features such as the Ghost River, Phantom Crag and Devil's Head.
