= Ghost River Wilderness Area =

Protected area in the Canadian Rockies

- IUCN category Ia (strict nature reserve)
- Location within Alberta
- Location: Bighorn No. 8, Canadian Rockies, Alberta, Canada
- Nearest city: Canmore, Alberta
- Coordinates: 51.3532403126°N 115.397148559°W
- Area: 153.2 km^{2} (59.14 mi^{2})
- Established: 1967
- Governing body: Alberta Tourism, Parks and Recreation
- Website: web.archive.org/web/20091227091906/http://www.albertaparks.ca/aboutparks.aspx

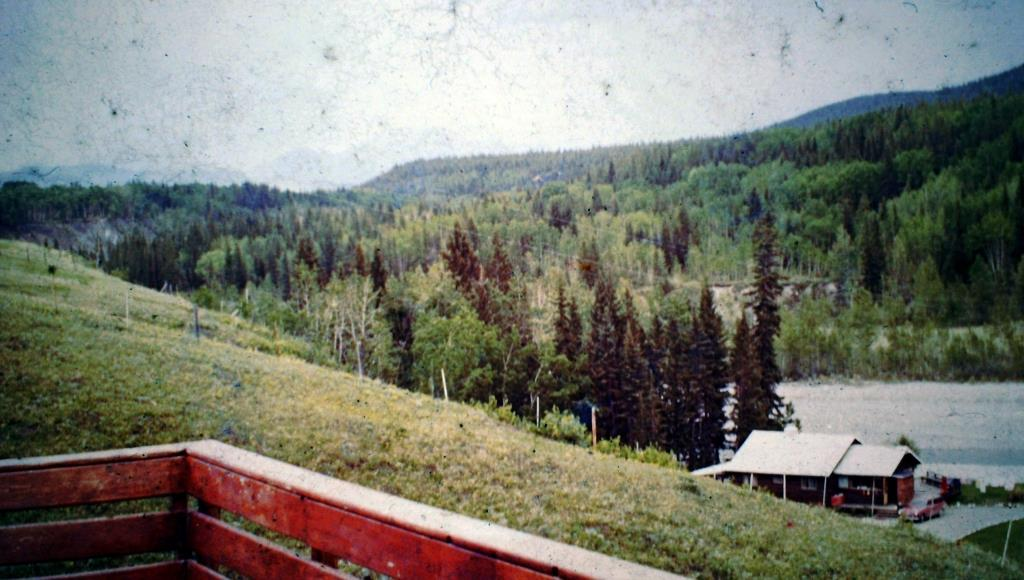
Ghost River Valley, Alberta (1970)

The Ghost River Wilderness Area is a provincially designated wilderness area in the Canadian Rockies of Alberta protecting the headwaters of the Ghost River. It was established in 1967 and it, as one of the three wilderness areas of Alberta, has the strictest form of government protection available in Canada. All development is forbidden, and only travel by foot is permitted. Hunting and fishing are not allowed. The other two wilderness areas are White Goat Wilderness Area and Siffleur Wilderness Area and together the three areas total 1,009.8882 square kilometres (249,548.80 acres).

Situated west of Calgary and bordering Banff National Park, the Ghost Wilderness spans the area north of the Trans-Canada Highway (Highway 1) along the eastern slope of the Rocky Mountains up to the Red Deer River. It lies just slightly north of Lake Minnewanka. Mountains rise to 3,400 metres (11,000 ft). The area has rugged mountains, glacier-carved valleys, mountain lakes, and alpine meadows. There are two distinct vegetation zones. Above 2,100 metres (6,900 ft), the tree line, are grasses, sedges and wildflowers. Below that are subalpine forests of spruce, fir, and lodgepole pine. There are many rare species of butterflies. Animals include bighorn sheep, deer, moose, cougars, bears, wild horses, and northern Rocky Mountain wolves. The area is a world-class venue for ice climbing.

The area was also a filming location for the Academy Award-winning 1994 epic drama film Legends of the Fall.
