= Mount Astley =

Mountain in Banff NP, Alberta, Canada

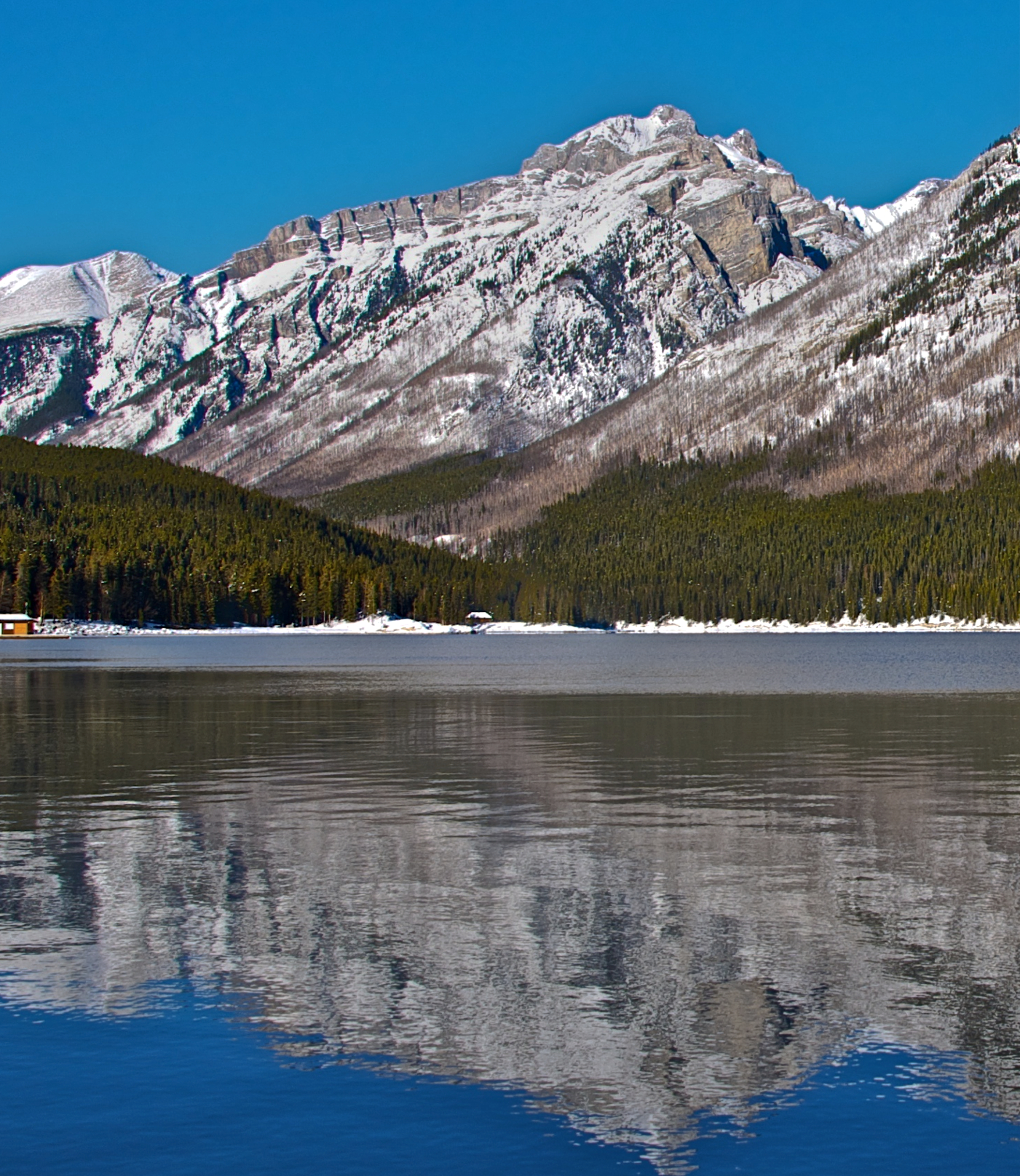
- Mount Astley reflected in Lake Minnewanka

Highest point
- Elevation: 2,869 m (9,413 ft)
- Listing: Mountains of Alberta
- Coordinates: 51°18′00″N 115°29′10″W

Geography
- Location within Alberta Location within Canada
- Country: Canada
- Province: Alberta
- Protected area: Banff National Park
- Parent range: Palliser Range; Canadian Rockies
- Topo map: NTS 82O6 Lake Minnewanka

Climbing
- Easiest route: Scramble

Mount Astley is a 2,869-metre (9,413-foot) mountain summit located in the Palliser Range of the Canadian Rockies in Alberta, Canada. It is situated in Banff National Park above Lake Minnewanka. It was named after Charles D'Oyley Astley, who ran the boat concession on the lake in the late 1800s.

== Geology ==
Mount Astley is composed of sedimentary rock laid down during the Precambrian to Jurassic periods. Formed in shallow seas, this sedimentary rock was pushed east and over the top of younger rock during the Laramide orogeny.

== Climate ==
Based on the Köppen climate classification, Mount Astley is located in a subarctic climate with cold, snowy winters, and mild summers. Temperatures can drop below −20 °C with wind chill factors below −30 °C. Precipitation runoff from Mount Astley drains into tributaries of the Bow River.

== Gallery ==
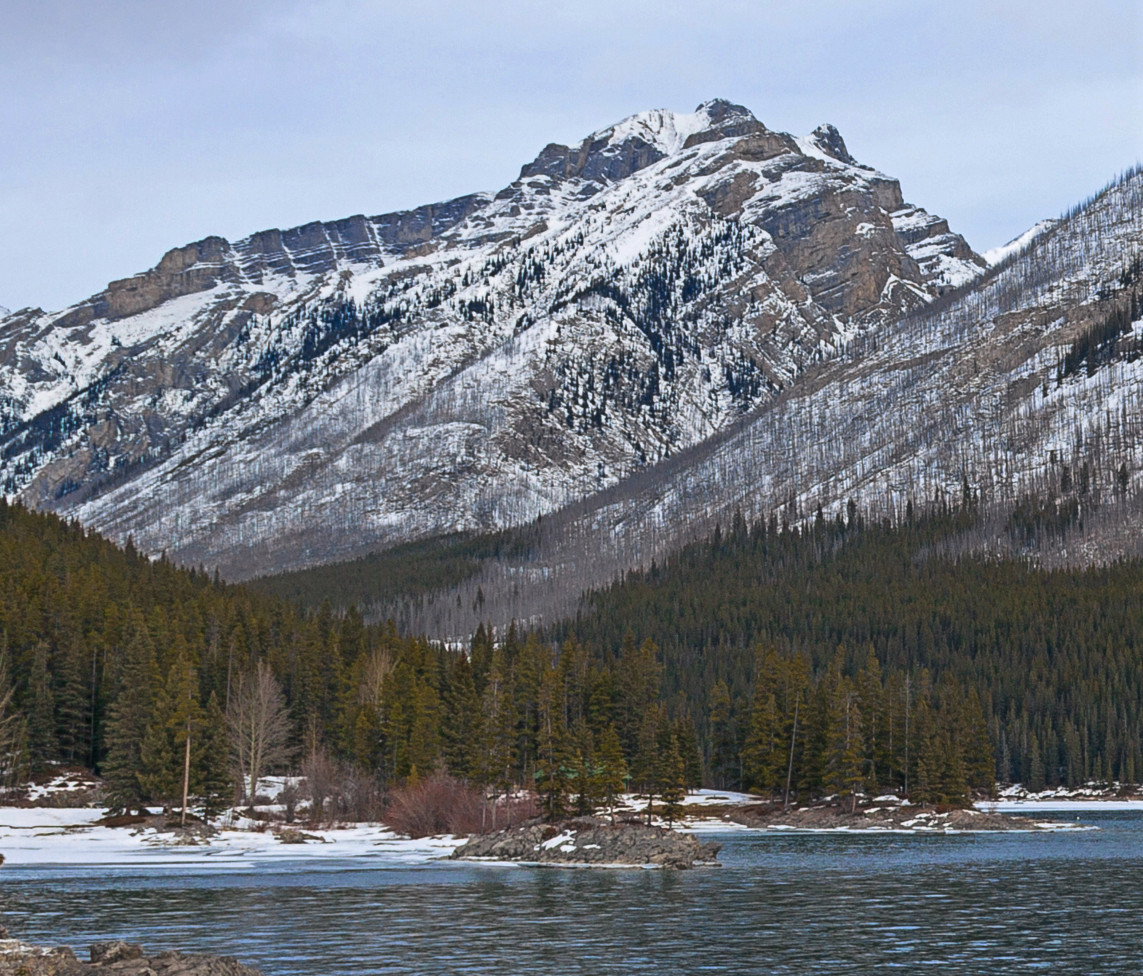
Mount Astley seen from Lake Minnewanka

== See also ==
- Geography of Alberta
