= Siffleur Mountain =

Mountain summit in Alberta, Canada

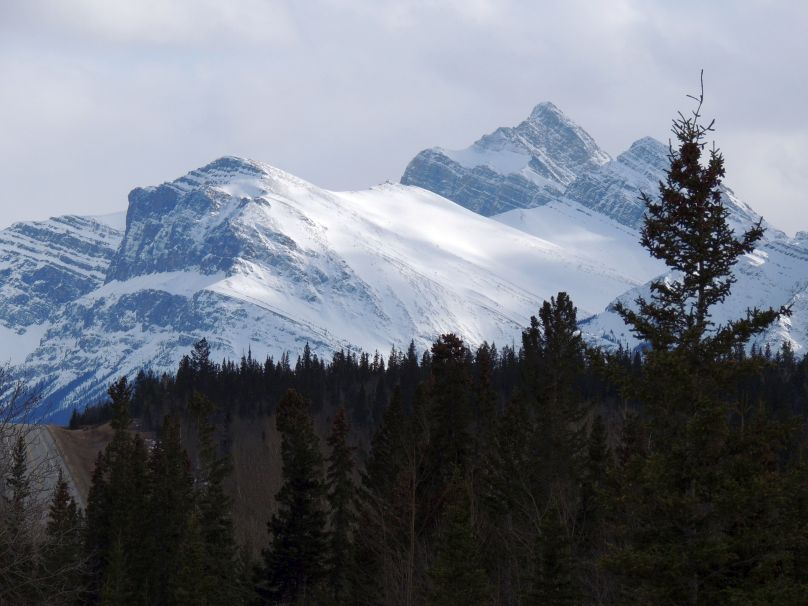
- Siffleur Mountain

Highest point
- Elevation: 3,129 m (10,266 ft)
- Prominence: 386 m (1,266 ft)
- Parent peak: Mount Loudon (3221 m)
- Listing: Mountains of Alberta
- Coordinates: 51°55′56″N 116°24′32″W

Naming
- English translation: Whistler
- Language of name: French

Geography
- Location within Alberta Location within Canada
- Location: Alberta, Canada
- Parent range: Murchison Group; Canadian Rockies
- Topo map: NTS 82N16 Siffleur River

Geology
- Rock type: Sedimentary

Climbing
- First ascent: 1924
- Easiest route: Scrambling

Siffleur Mountain is a 3,129-metre (10,266 ft) mountain summit located in the North Saskatchewan River valley of Alberta, Canada. Siffleur Mountain is situated in the Siffleur Wilderness Area of the Canadian Rockies. Its nearest higher peak is Mount Loudon, 3 km (1.9 mi) to the southwest. The mountain can be seen from Highway 11, the David Thompson Highway. Precipitation runoff from Siffleur Mountain flows north via Loudon Creek and Siffleur River.

== History ==
Like the Siffleur Wilderness Area and Siffleur River, the mountain's name was chosen by James Hector in 1858 for the shrill whistles of the marmot which inhabit the area.

The mountain's name became official in 1924 when approved by the Geographical Names Board of Canada.

The first ascent was made in 1924 by Morrison P. Bridgland. Bridgland (1878-1948) was a Dominion Land Surveyor who climbed and named many peaks in the Canadian Rockies.

== Geology ==
Siffleur Mountain is composed of sedimentary rock laid down from the Precambrian to Jurassic periods that was pushed east and over the top of younger rock during the Laramide orogeny.

== Climate ==
Based on the Köppen climate classification, Siffleur Mountain is located in a subarctic climate with cold, snowy winters, and mild summers. Temperatures can drop below -20 °C with wind chill factors below -30 °C.

== Gallery ==
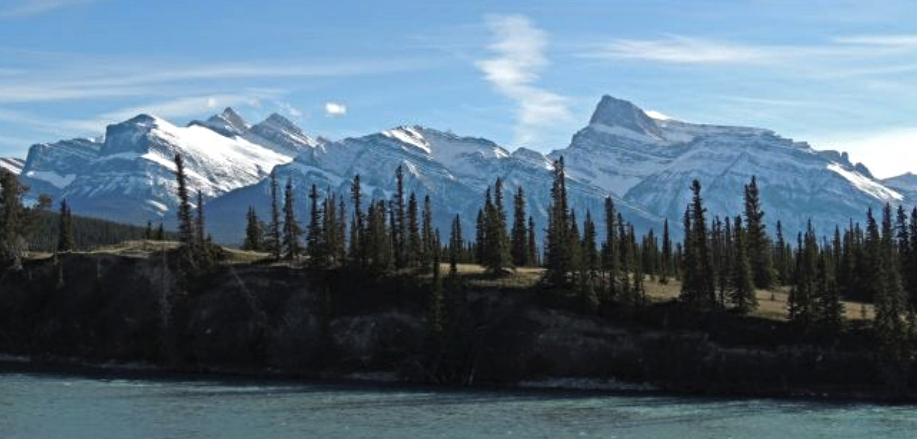
Siffleur Mountain (left) seen with Mount Peskett (right)

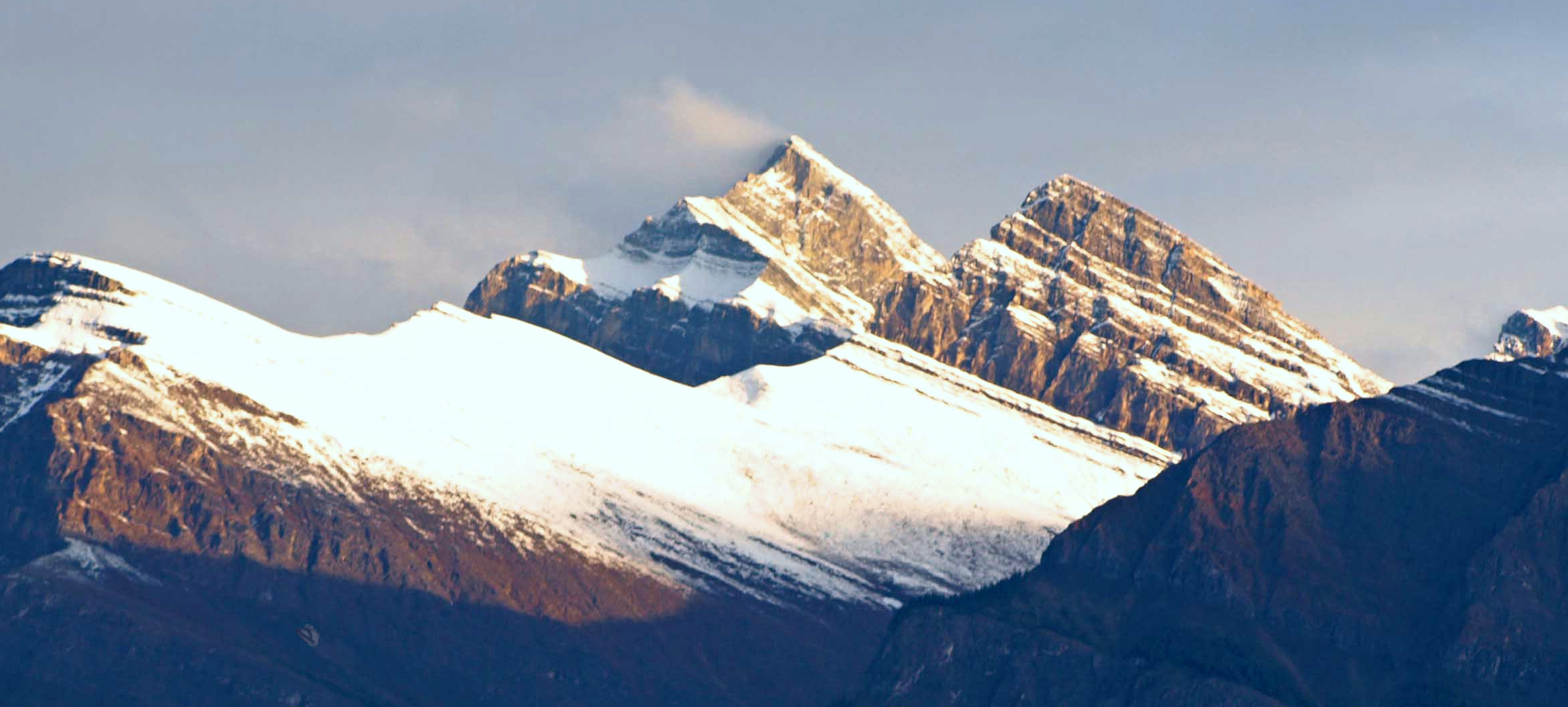
Siffleur Mountain in 2007

== See also ==
- List of mountains of Canada
- Geography of Alberta
- Geology of the Rocky Mountains
