= Ghost River (Alberta) =

River in Alberta, Canada

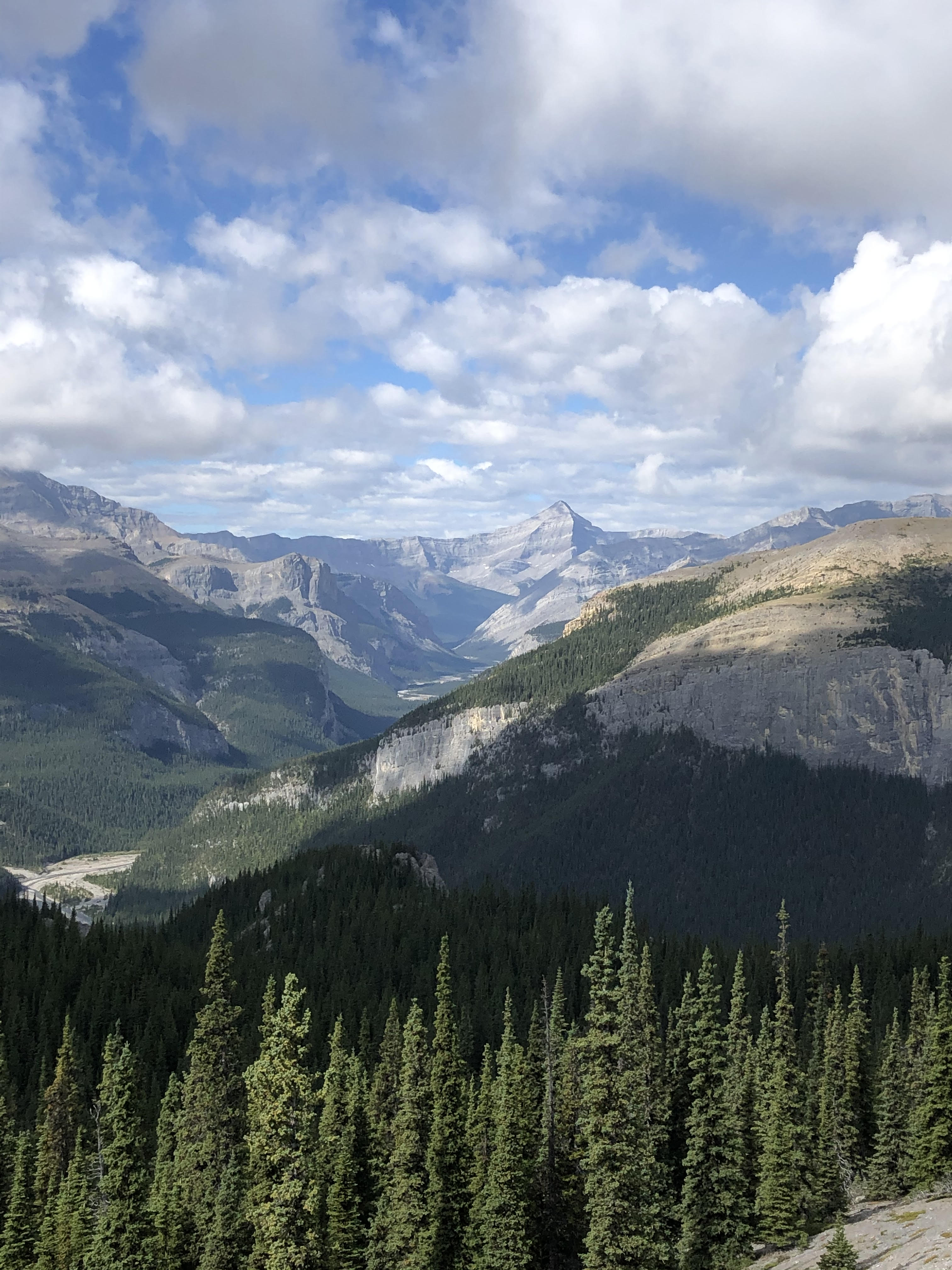
- Mount Aylmer with the North Ghost in the foreground

Location
- Country: Canada
- Province: Alberta

Physical characteristics
- Source: South slopes of Mount Oliver
  - coordinates: 51°24′38″N 115°29′20″W
- Mouth: Bow River at Ghost Lake
  - coordinates: 51°13′26″N 114°42′48″W
- Basin size: 911 km^{2} (352 sq mi)
- Discharge
  - average: 119 m^{3}/s (4,200 cu ft/s)
  - minimum: 111 m^{3}/s (3,900 cu ft/s)
  - maximum: 453 m^{3}/s (16,000 cu ft/s)

Basin features
- Tributaries
  - left: Leseur Creek, Waiparous Creek, Robinson Creek
  - right: Spectral Creek, Baymar Creek

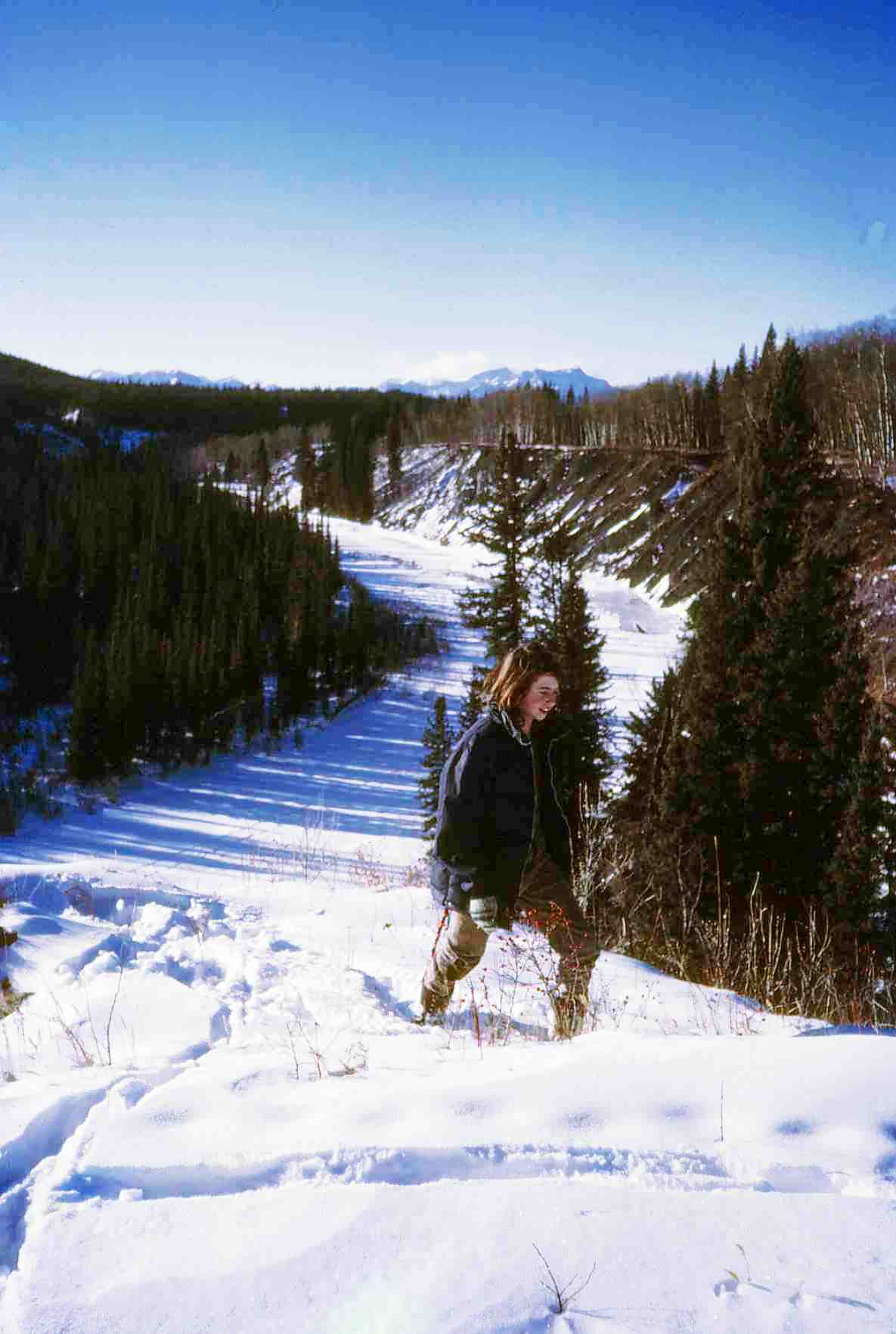
Ghost River in winter

The Ghost River is a river in Alberta, Canada. It begins within the front ranges of the Canadian Rocky Mountains, joining the Bow River at Ghost Lake. These waters flow through Cochrane, Calgary, and ultimately into Hudson Bay. The upper reaches of the Ghost are fully protected by the Ghost River Wilderness Area.

The origin of the name Ghost varies somewhat, but generally relates to local First Nations legends regarding a battle at the confluence of the Ghost and Bow between the Stoney and Blackfoot peoples. Spirits of those slain in the battle were said to haunt the area, leading to the name being adopted after it was initially coined Deadman's River by the Palliser Expedition in 1860.

== Course ==
The Ghost River begins in two separate forks, the North Ghost and South Ghost. The North Ghost, longer of the two, forms on the South slope of Mount Oliver in the Front Ranges. The North Ghost flows generally eastward, meeting the South Ghost and passing through the settlements of Waiparous and Benchlands before entering a canyon and eventually meeting the Bow at Ghost Lake. From there the Bow joins the South Saskatchewan River, eventually flowing into Hudson Bay via the Nelson River.

Apart from the hydroelectric dam at Ghost Lake, there are no hydro projects operating on the river itself. Until 2013, a diversion dam high in the watershed operated by TransAlta diverted some flow of the North Ghost into Lake Minnewanka to augment the natural catchment of the lake. The diversion dam was rendered inoperable after significant flooding in 2013 devastated the area, with remediation work of the dam and berms ongoing.

A larger diversion from the North Ghost to Lake Minnewanka has been studied as part of larger Southern Alberta flood remediation efforts in the wake of the 2013 floods, however it was deemed non-viable as the diversion would be too high on the course of the Ghost to reduce downstream flow effectively.

== History ==
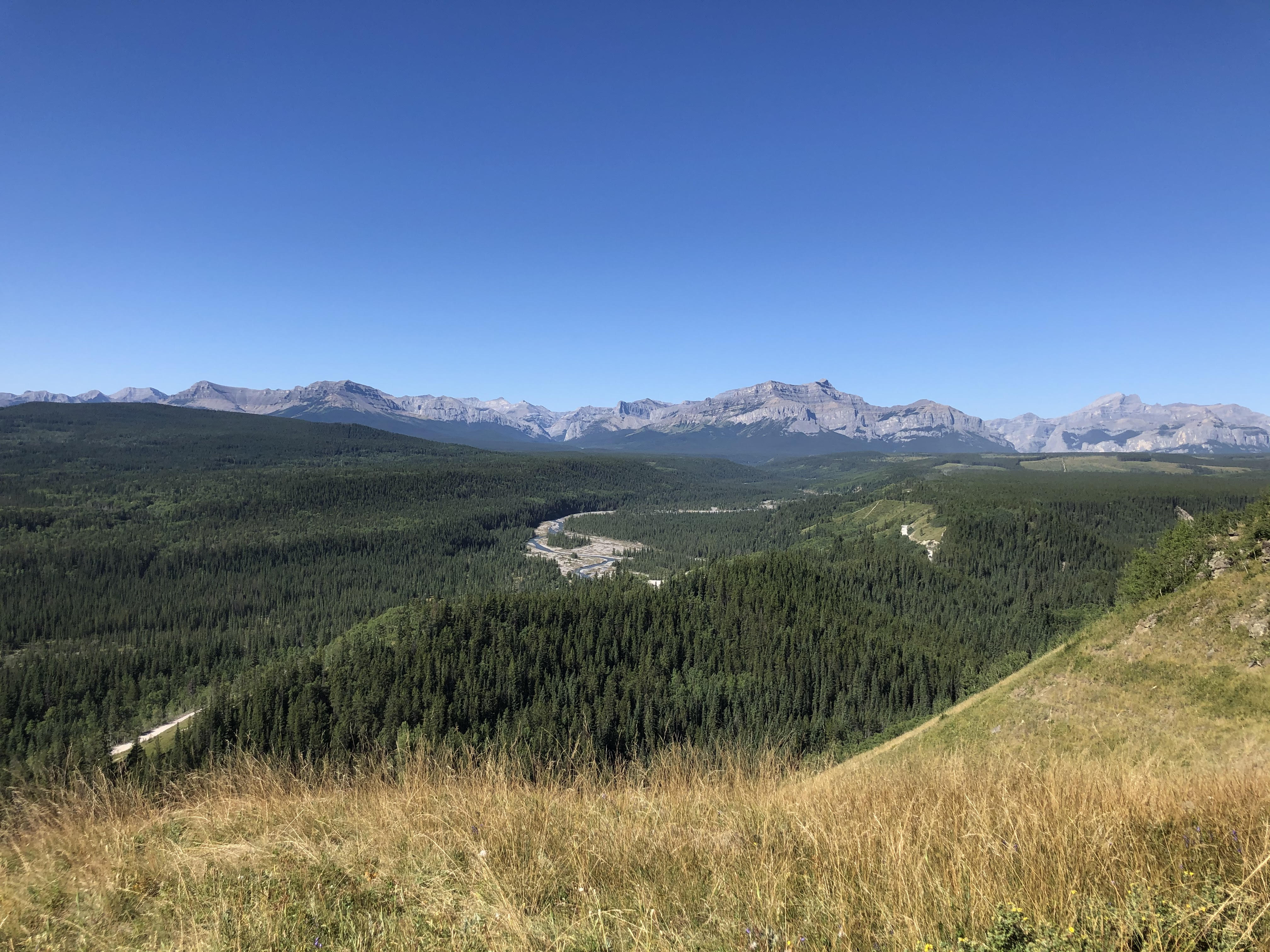
The Ghost River passes below the Front Ranges through the Ghost Public Land Use Zone

The Ghost River watershed has been inhabited for hundreds of years before European exploration, notably by the Assiniboia people. With the signing of Treaty 7 at Crowfoot Crossing in 1877, the Iyhe Nakoda were assigned reserve lands on the Eastern Slopes of the Rocky Mountains in their traditional hunting areas. Today they have reserve lands at Morley extending north from the Bow Valley to the Ghost River. Notable early explorers in the area were David Thompson, who camped above the confluence of the Bow and Ghost in 1800, and James Hector, who documented the geology of the Ghost watershed during several expeditions from 1858-60.

The first permanent settlement in the area was established with the Morleyville mission in 1873, founded by missionary George McDougall. Further development and ranching was spurred by the completion of CPR tracks through the area in the 1880s. The two permanent communities along the Ghost, the hamlet of Benchlands and summer village of Waiparous were incorporated in 1978 and 1986, respectively.

Several ranger stations and fire lookouts were constructed through the late 19th and early 20th centuries, such as the one atop Black Rock Mountain. The Aura Ranger Station served the area from 1917 until it was abandoned and burned down in the 1960s. Though the last fully-staffed ranger station remaining in the Ghost watershed closed in 1996, a small firebase still exists near the old Aura Station on Highway 40.

Since September 4, 2020, a large wildfire has been burning in the North Ghost watershed between Devil's Head and Black Rock Mountain. Investigations by Alberta Wildfire concluded that the blaze was started by an abandoned campfire in the region. Despite growing out of control in early October and prompting evacuation alerts at Waiparous and Benchlands, the fire is now considered under control.

== Conservation ==
The uppermost reaches of the North Ghost are protected by the 59.14 mi^{2} (153.2 km^{2}) Ghost River Wilderness Area, established in 1967. Alberta Wilderness Areas prohibit development of any kind and allow only foot traffic, banning equestrian and vehicular travel. Below the GRWA, the river passes through the Ghost Public Land Use Zone. Established in 2006, the 1,500 km^{2} (580 sq mi) PLUZ is meant to address the growing demand for recreation and the potential conflicts with other resource values and stakeholders in the Ghost-Waiparous area. An area of special concern that lead to the establishment of the PLUZ was the popularity of off highway vehicles in the region, and lack of rules around their use.

Ongoing concerns regarding OHV use in the Ghost PLUZ remain. In 2011, significant sedimentation and decreased water quality was found in the watershed that was directly attributable to OHV use in the area. However, most indicators of environmental health in the region (such as air quality, surface run-off, groundwater quality, riparian health) remain in good health.

== Recreation ==
The Ghost River, through the Ghost Public Land Use Zone, provides ample opportunity for recreation through hiking, scrambling, climbing, ice climbing, camping, and hunting. The rock and ice climbing along the North Ghost in particular is well-regarded as one of the premier destinations for such activities in the country. In addition, random camping is allowed within the PLUZ, unlike provincial and national parks in Alberta.

Popular hikes and scrambles in the area include Leseur Ridge, Black Rock Mountain, Bastion Ridge, and Orient Point, while more challenging alpine climbs include Devil's Head and Phantom Crag. Much of the premier hiking and climbing located at the headwaters of the Ghost is accessed by a rough utility road significantly damaged in 2013, necessitating a high clearance and four-wheel drive vehicle.

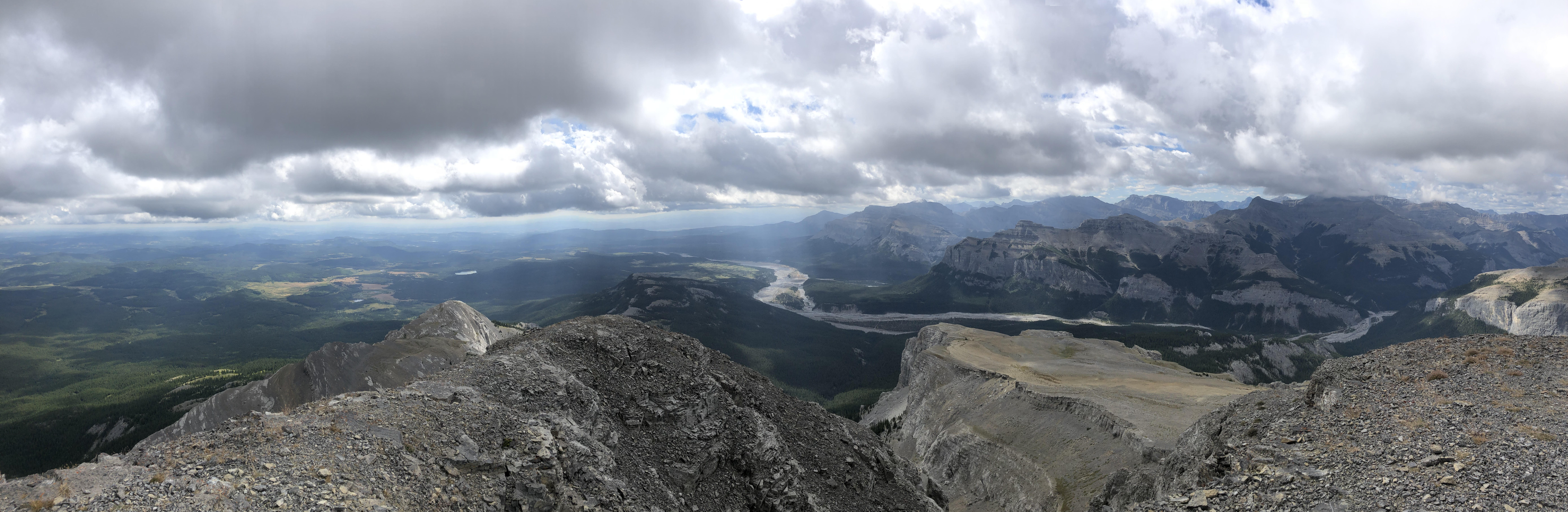
The North Ghost River from the summit of Black Rock Mountain. The remains of the TransAlta diversion dam destroyed in the 2013 Floods can be seen near the center of the image.

== See also ==
- List of rivers of Alberta
- TransAlta
