= Siffleur Falls =

Coordinates: 52°01′27″N 116°22′11″W

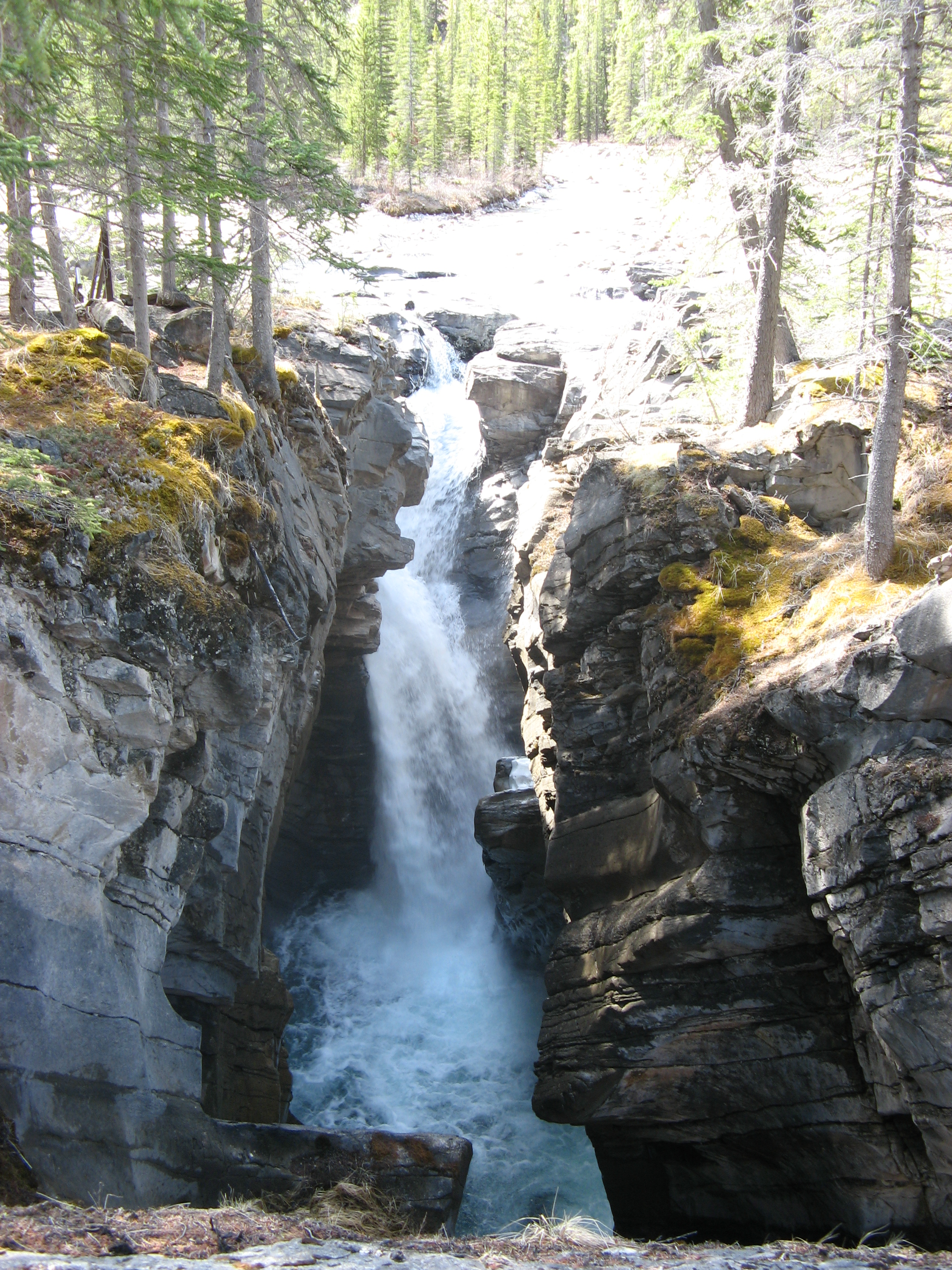
Siffleur Falls

Siffleur Falls are a series of three separate waterfalls on the Siffleur River, an early tributary of the North Saskatchewan River. The falls are a short distance from the David Thompson Highway, in the Siffleur Wilderness Area, just north of Banff National Park.

== See also ==
- List of waterfalls
- List of waterfalls in Canada
