= Black Rock Mountain (Alberta) =

Mountain in Alberta, Canada

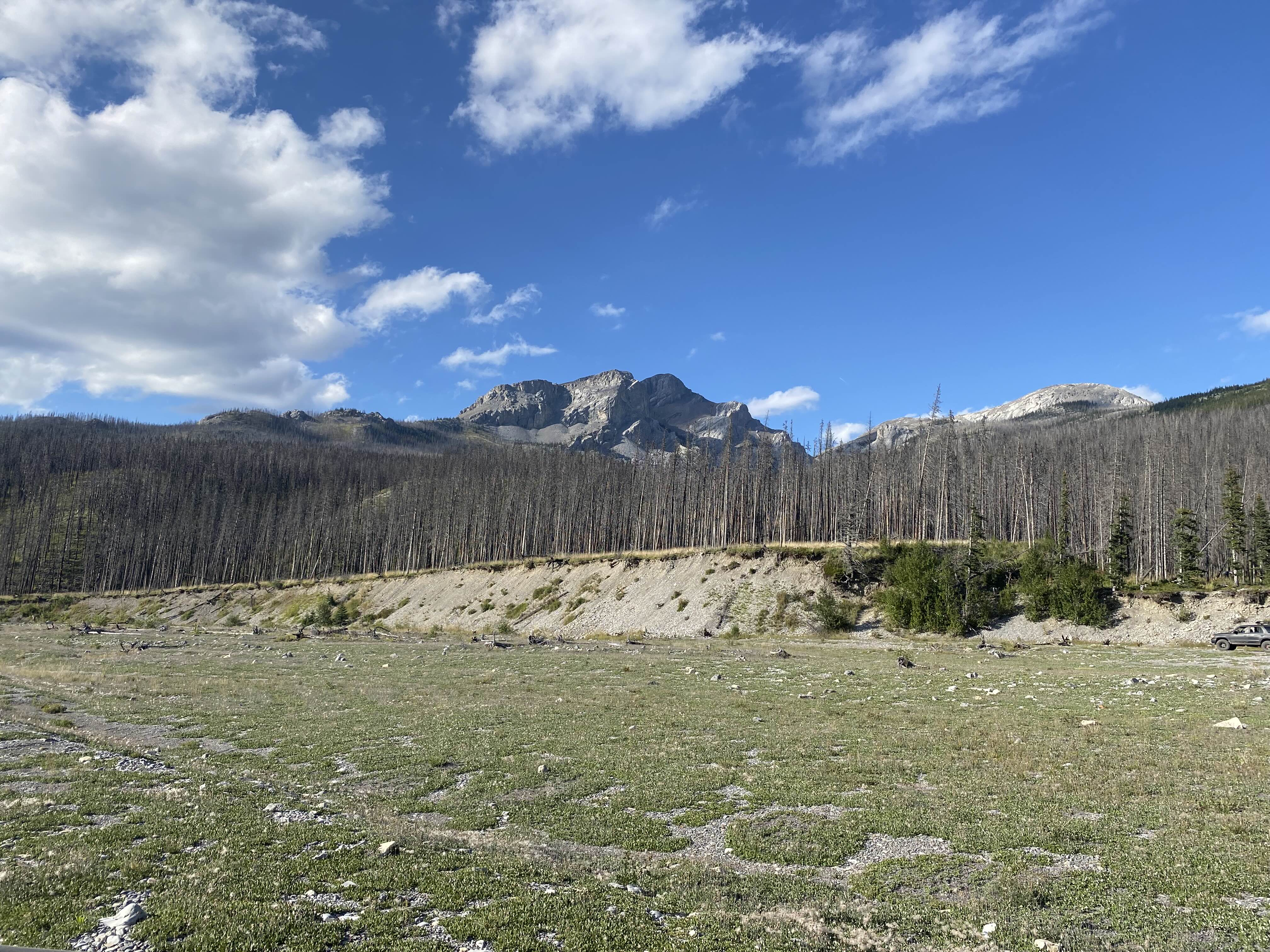
- Black Rock Mountain as seen from Ghost River.

Highest point
- Elevation: 2,462 m (8,077 ft)
- Prominence: 722 m (2,369 ft)
- Listing: Mountains of Alberta
- Coordinates: 51°20′04″N 115°10′06″W

Geography
- Location within Alberta
- Location: Alberta, Canada
- Parent range: Front Ranges, Canadian Rockies
- Topo map: NTS 82O6 Lake Minnewanka

Black Rock Mountain (frequently misspelled Blackrock Mountain) is a mountain on the eastern fringe of the Canadian Rockies in Alberta, Canada. Black Rock Mountain was descriptively named.

It is located on the north-eastern edge of Kananaskis Country, almost directly west of Calgary. It stands approximately 5 km (3 mi) east of the Central Front Ranges, and is part of the Ghost River Area of the East Banff Ranges.

The mountain is a popular hike for locals, as it offers an unimpeded view of the prairies. A lookout was built by Alberta Forest Service on the summit in 1929, and was in service until 1959.

Black Rock Mountain was named in 1958 for its black appearance, particularly from the east.
