= Mount Aylmer =

Mountain in Banff National Park, Canada

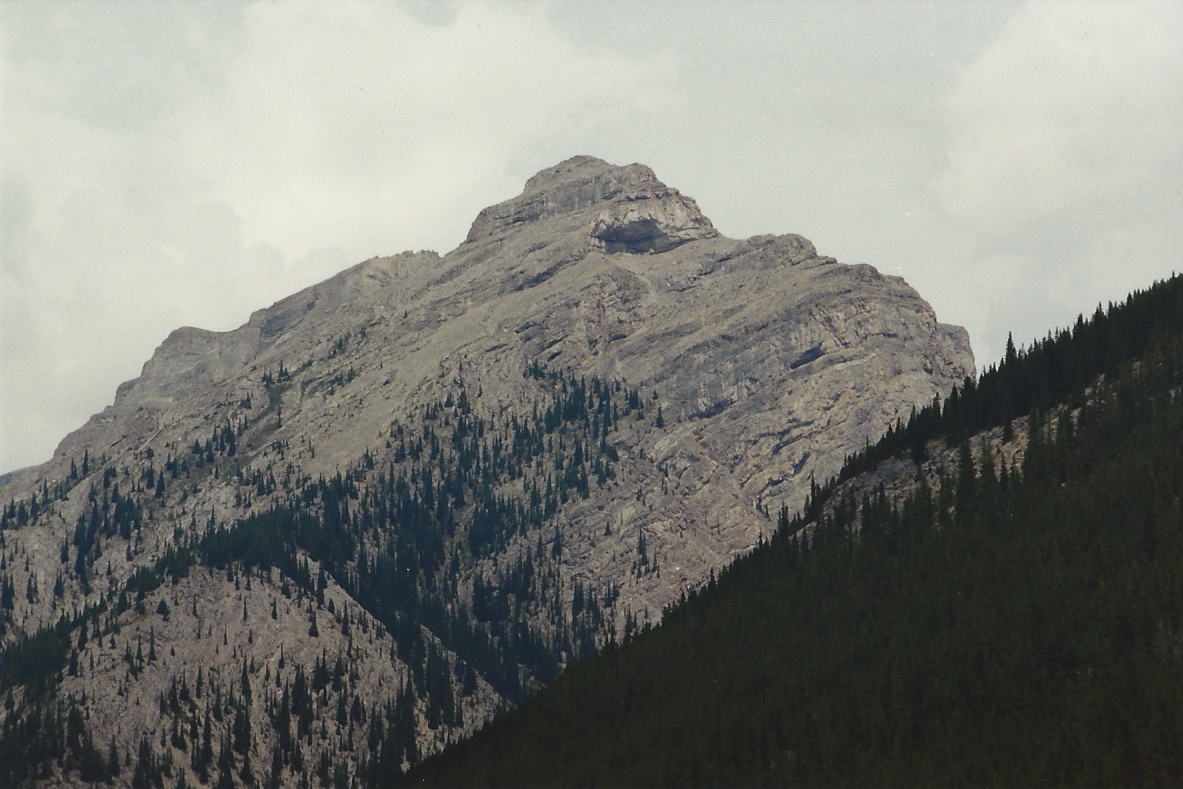
- Mount Aylmer, August 1994

Highest point
- Elevation: 3,162 m (10,374 ft)
- Prominence: 1,142 m (3,747 ft)
- Listing: Mountains of Alberta
- Coordinates: 51°19′26″N 115°26′00″W

Geography
- Location within Alberta
- Country: Canada
- Province: Alberta
- Protected area: Banff National Park
- Parent range: Palliser Range
- Topo map: NTS 82O6 Lake Minnewanka

Climbing
- First ascent: 1889 by J.J. McArthur
- Easiest route: moderate scramble on SW

Mount Aylmer is a mountain in Banff National Park, Canada. At 3,162 m (10,374 ft), it is the highest point of the Palliser Range and the entire East Banff Ranges of the Canadian Rockies. The mountain was named in 1890 by J.J. McArthur after his hometown of Aylmer, Quebec.

The summit can be climbed via scrambling. Anyone who reaches the summit is rewarded with not only a great view of Lake Minnewanka but also a summit registry box. Names collected in this box are entered into the archives of the Whyte Museum in Banff.

== Gallery ==
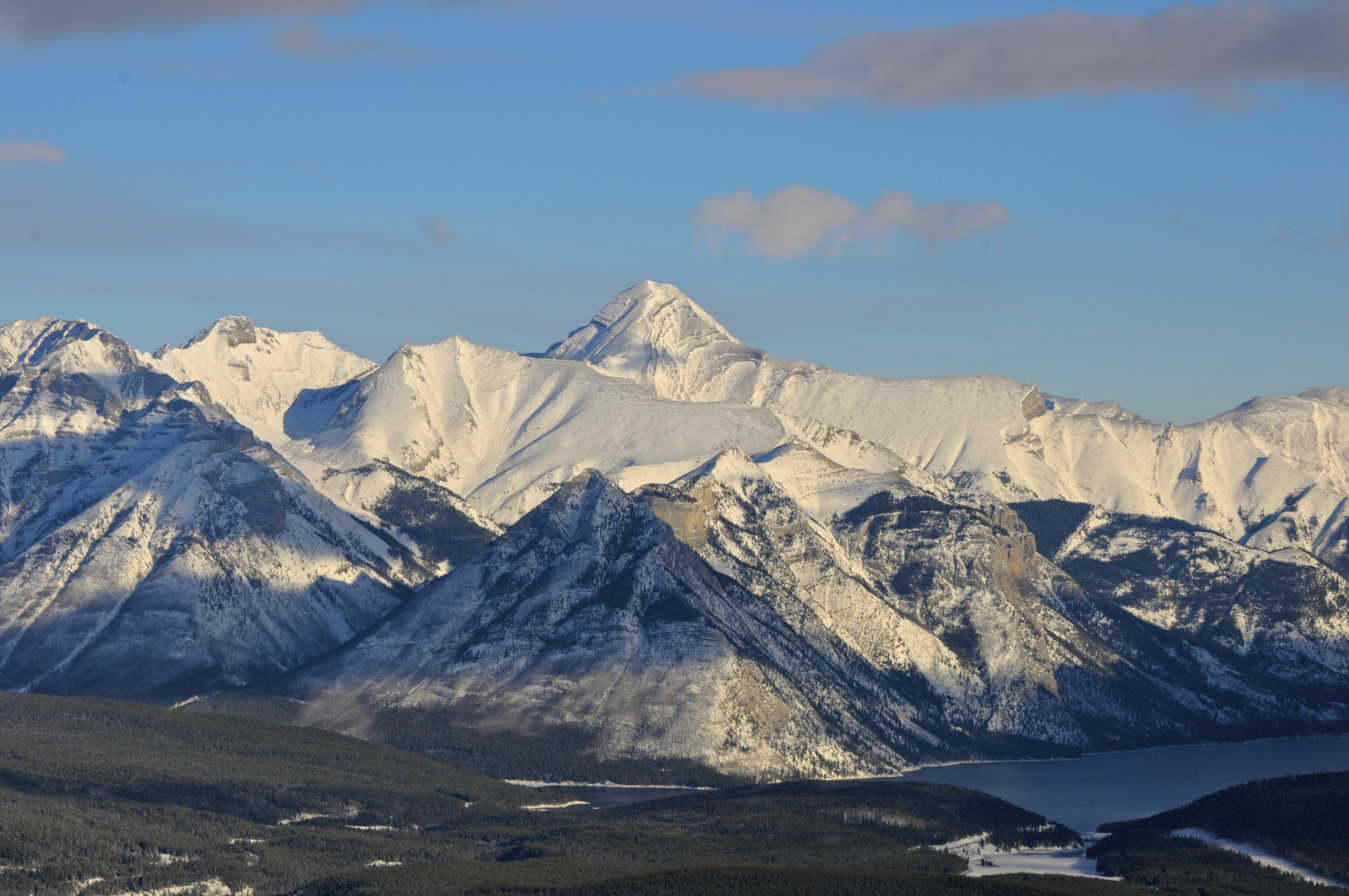
Mount Aylmer (centered), Lake Minnewanka (lower right)

== See also ==
- List of mountains in the Canadian Rockies
