= Siffleur Wilderness Area =

Provincially designated wilderness area in the Canadian Rockies of Alberta

- IUCN category Ia (strict nature reserve)
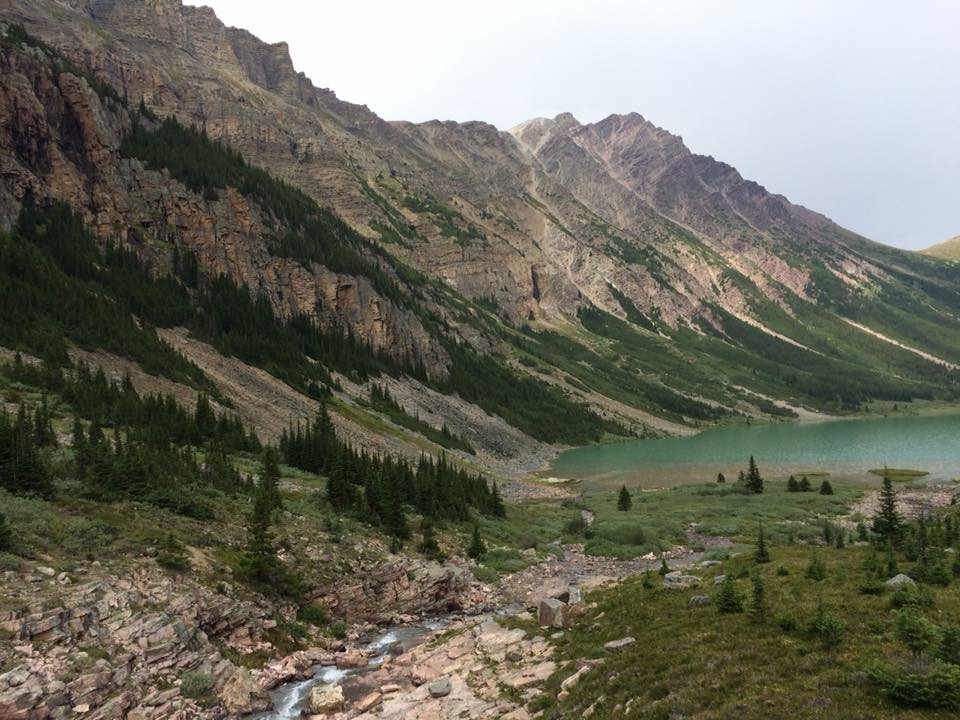
- Siffleur Wilderness Area in July 2016

- Location within Alberta
- Location: Canadian Rockies, Alberta, Canada
- Coordinates: 51°53′59″N 116°23′32″W
- Area: 41,214 hectares (101,840 acres)
- Established: 1961
- Governing body: Alberta Tourism, Parks and Recreation
- Website: www.albertaparks.ca/aboutparks.aspx

The Siffleur Wilderness Area is a provincially designated wilderness area in the Canadian Rockies of Alberta. It was established in 1961 and it, as one of the three wilderness areas of Alberta, has the strictest form of government protection available in Canada. All development is forbidden and only travel by foot is permitted. Hunting and fishing are not allowed. The other two wilderness areas are White Goat Wilderness Area and Ghost River Wilderness Area and together the three areas total 249,548.80 acres (100,988.82 ha).

Siffleur is located near the west end and south side of Canadian Highway 11 and slightly south of the White Goat Wilderness area. It is near the north end of Banff National Park and the south end of Jasper National Park. Mountains rise to 3,300 metres (10,800 ft). The area has rugged mountains, glacier-carved valleys, mountain lakes, and alpine meadows. There are two distinct vegetation zones. Above 2,100 metres (6,900 ft), the tree line, are grasses, sedges and wildflowers. Below that are subalpine forests of spruce, fir, and lodgepole pine. At even lower elevations there are aspen and balsam poplar. Animals in the lower regions include woodland caribou, moose, elk, white-tailed deer, mule deer, grizzly bear, black bear, cougar, coyote, northern Rocky Mountain wolf, and wolverine. Animals in the upper regions include golden-mantled ground squirrels, bighorn sheep, mountain goat, hoary marmot, pika, white-tailed ptarmigan, grey-crowned rosy finch, water pipit and horned lark. Eagles are seen in both the lower and upper regions.

Like Siffleur Mountain and Siffleur River, the name was chosen by James Hector in 1858 for the shrill whistles of the marmot which inhabit the area.
