= Siffleur River =

River in Alberta, Canada

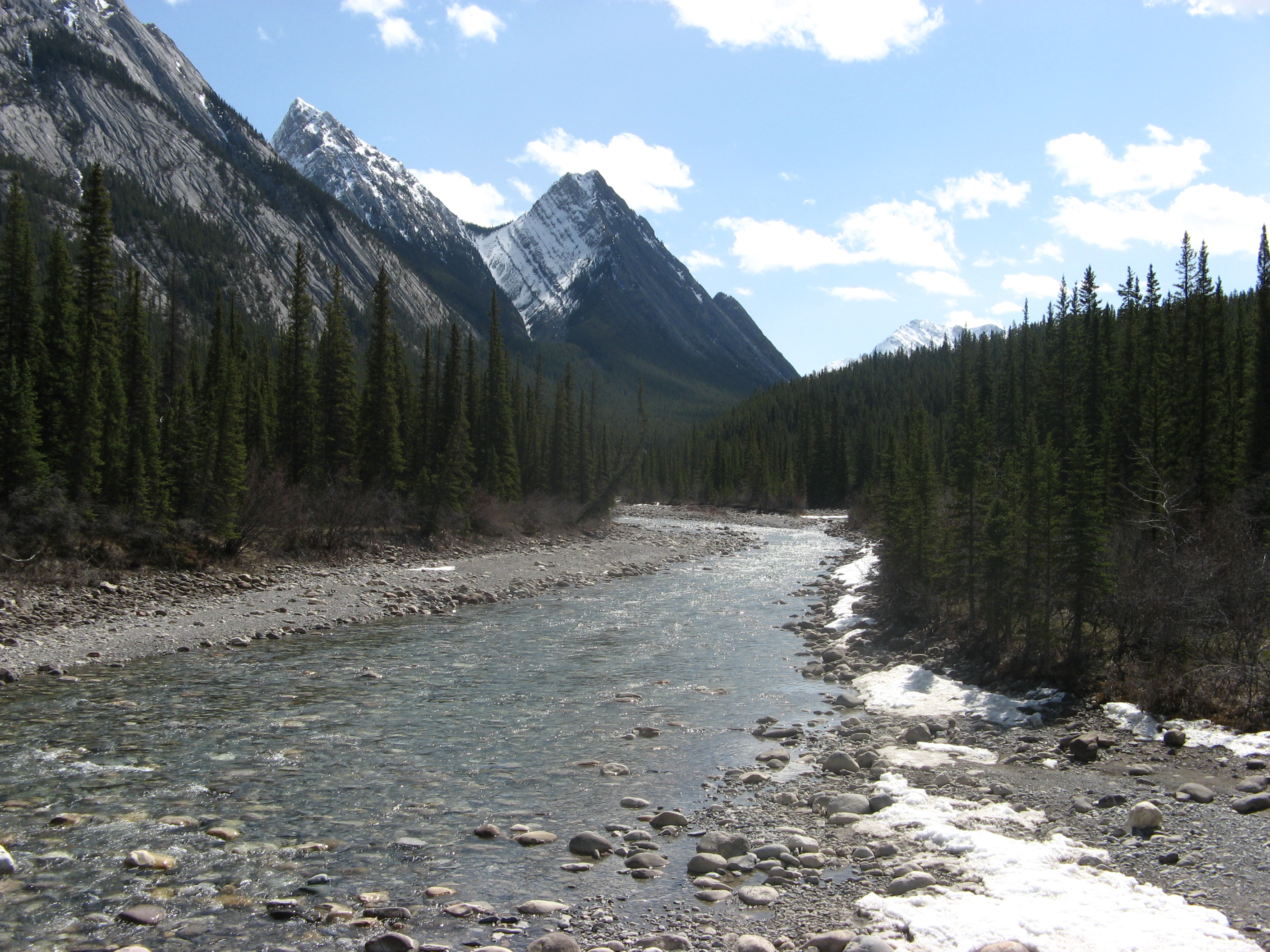
- The Siffleur River near its confluence with the North Saskatchewan River

Location
- Country: Canada
- Province: Alberta

Physical characteristics
- Source
  - location: Clearwater Pass
  - coordinates: 51°42′19″N 116°16′35″W
  - elevation: 2,341 m (7,680 ft)
- Mouth
  - location: North Saskatchewan River
  - coordinates: 52°03′25″N 116°24′14″W
  - elevation: 1,327 m (4,354 ft)

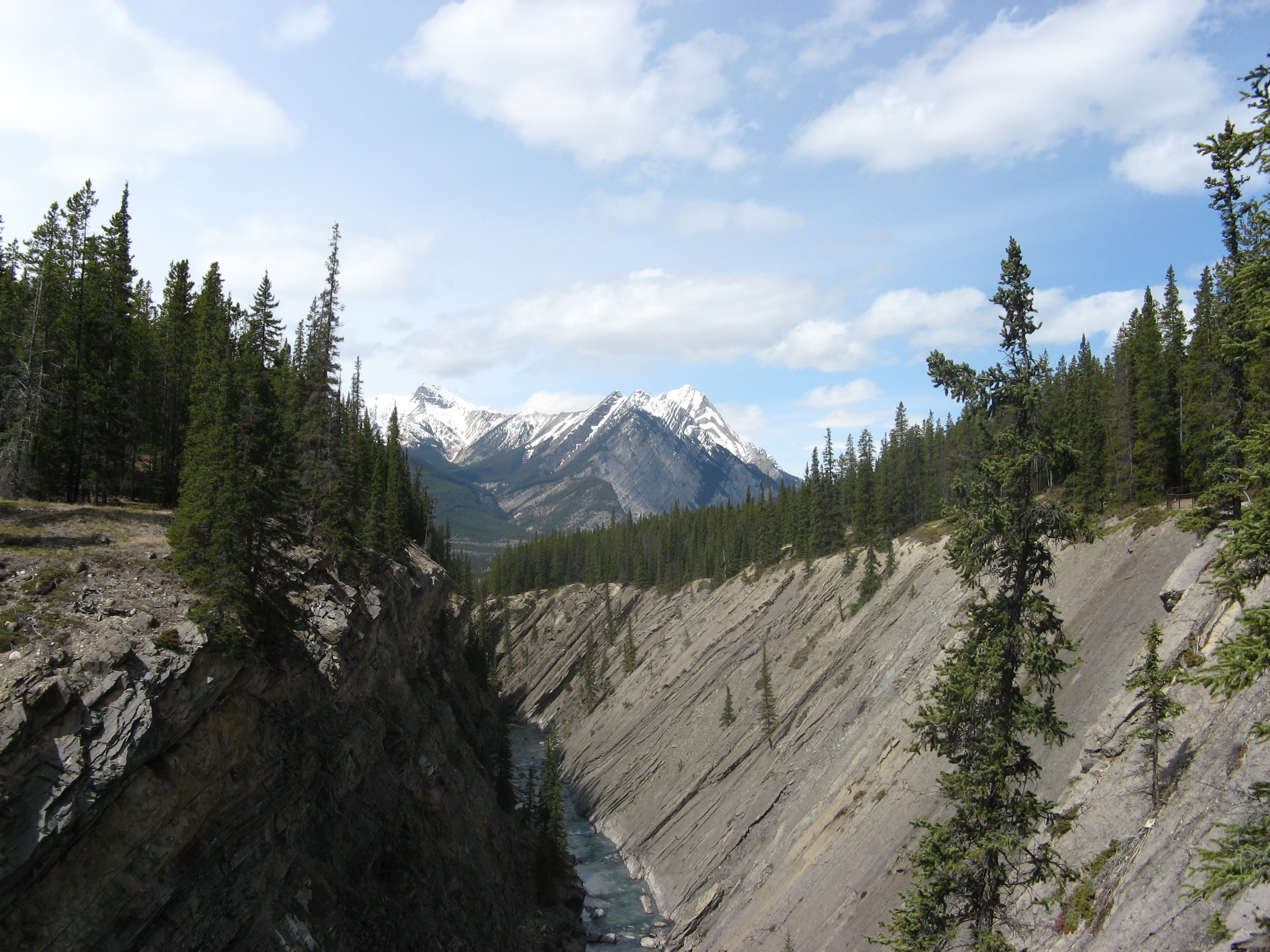
The Siffleur River

The Siffleur River is a short river rising in the Canadian Rockies in western Alberta. The Siffleur River is an early tributary of the North Saskatchewan River.

The river begins between Devon Mountain and Clearwater Mountain, at Clearwater Pass. The Siffleur is then joined by Dolomite Creek (flowing from Isabella Lake), and the Escarpment River. After plummeting over Siffleur Falls, the Siffleur River joins the North Saskatchewan River before Lake Abraham.

Like the Siffleur Wilderness Area and Siffleur Mountain, the river's name was chosen by James Hector in 1858 for the shrill whistles of the marmot which inhabit the area.

== See also ==
- List of Alberta rivers
