= Bow Valley Provincial Park =

Provincial park in Alberta, Canada

- IUCN category II (national park)
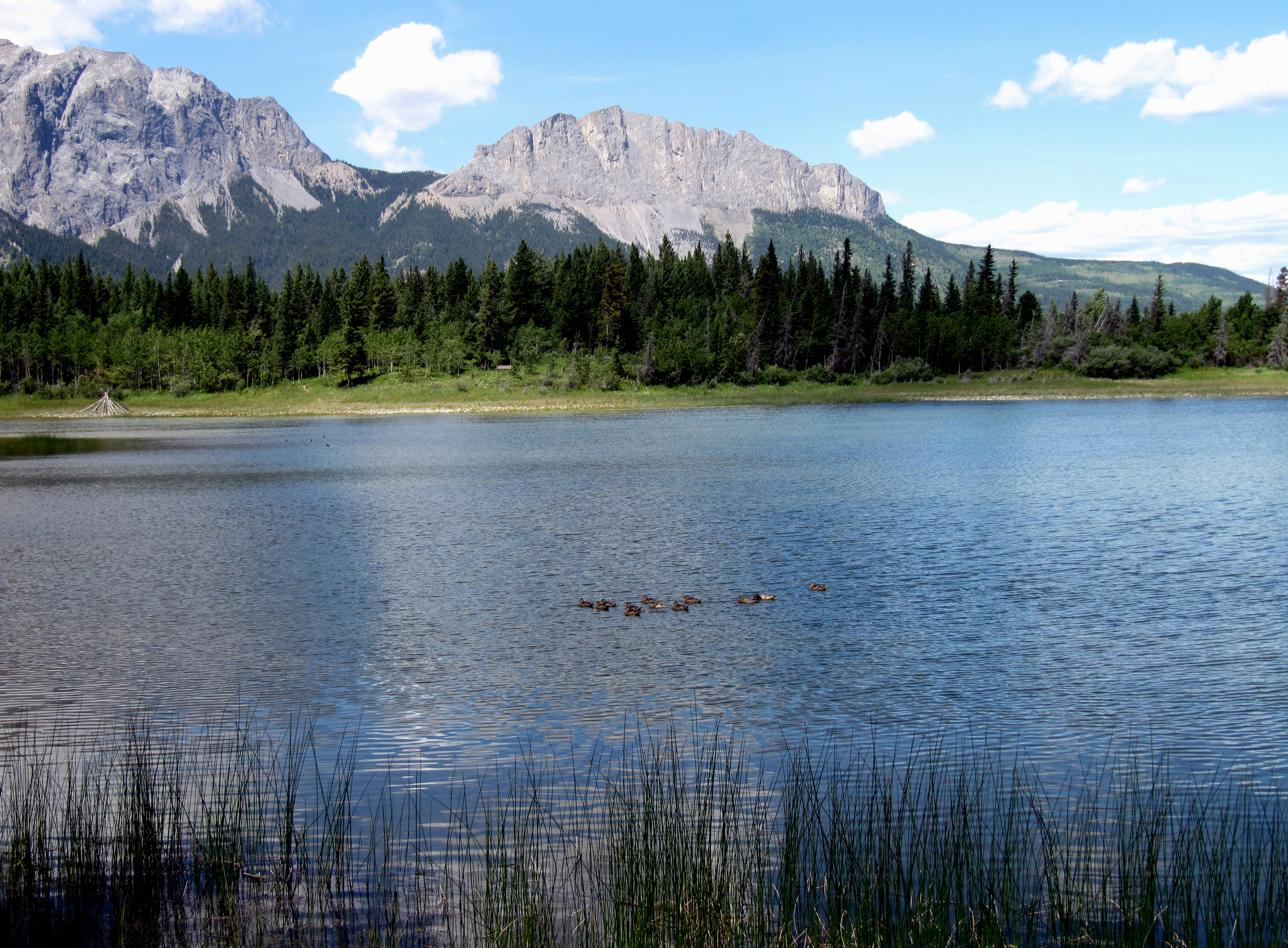
- Mount Yamnuska seen from Middle Lake in Bow Valley Provincial Park

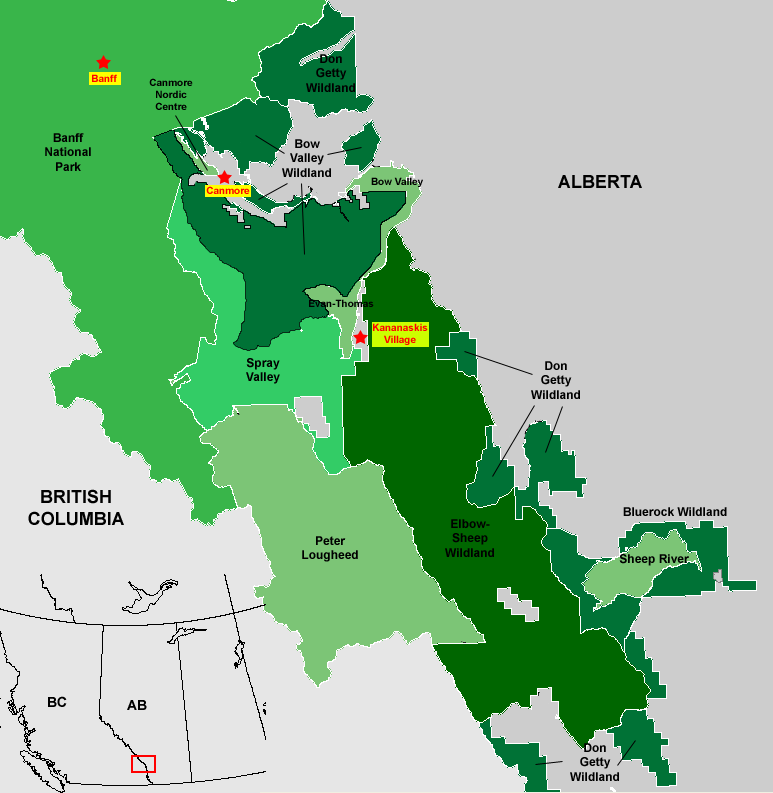
- Location within Kananaskis park system
- Location: District of Bighorn No. 8 Alberta Canada
- Nearest city: Canmore
- Coordinates: 51°04′31″N 115°04′09″W
- Area: 32.87 km^{2} (12.69 sq mi)
- Established: July 27, 1959
- Governing body: Alberta Tourism, Parks and Recreation, Bow Valley Park Campgrounds

Bow Valley Provincial Park is a provincial park in Alberta, Canada. Established in 1959 in the arch of the Bow River at its confluence with the Kananaskis River, the park is one park of many within the Kananaskis Country park system.

This park is located at the eastern edge of Alberta's Rocky Mountains in the Bow Valley, and it features trout fishing in the Bow River and spectacular mountain scenery. It includes forested areas, meadows, lakes, and an area of unusual "warm" springs. There are also glacial landforms such as eskers, kames, moraines, and kettle lakes that formed during the retreat of the Bow Valley glacier in the late Pleistocene.

== Geologic setting ==
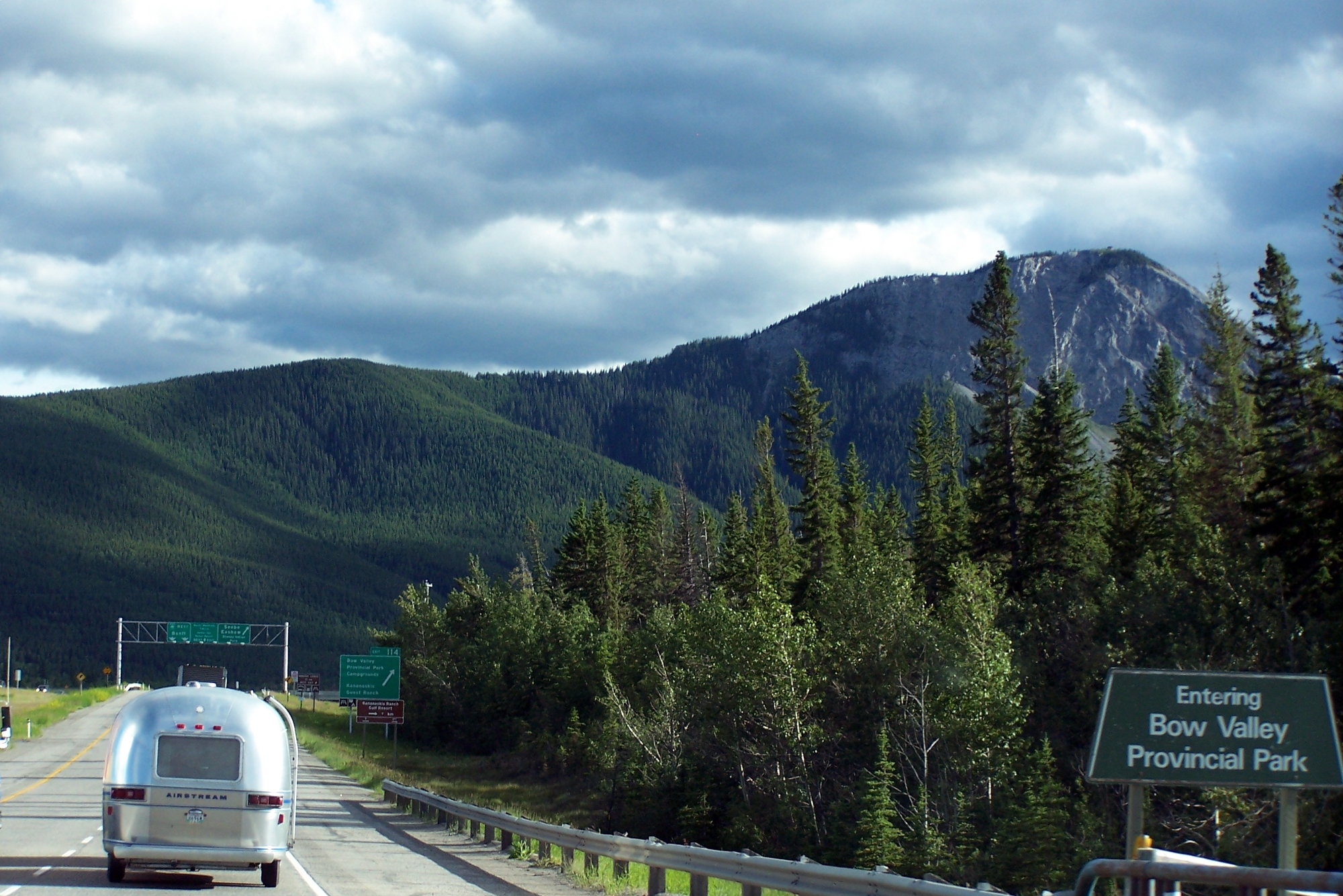
Entering Bow Valley Provincial Park

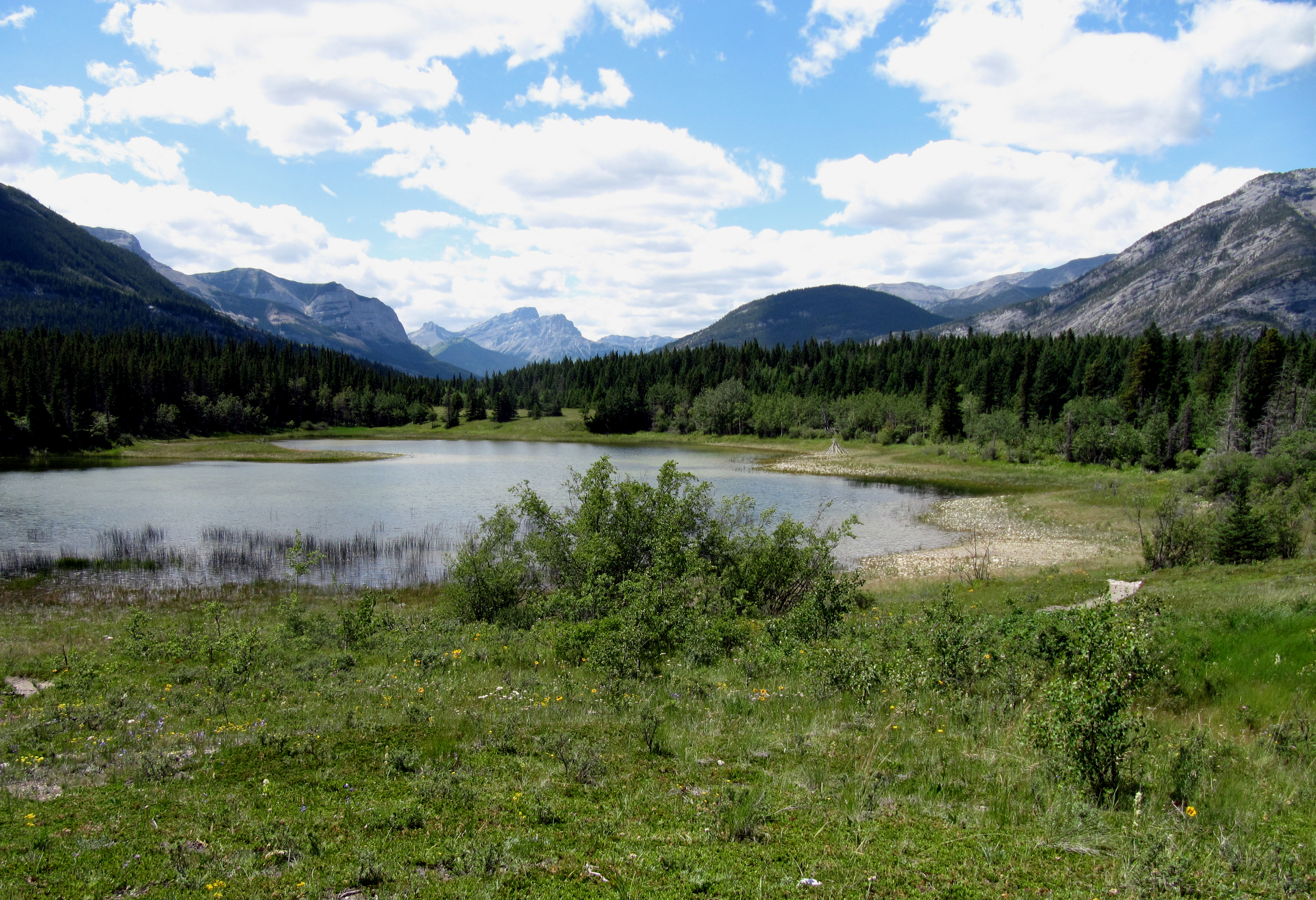
Mountain scenery at Middle Lake in Bow Valley Provincial Park

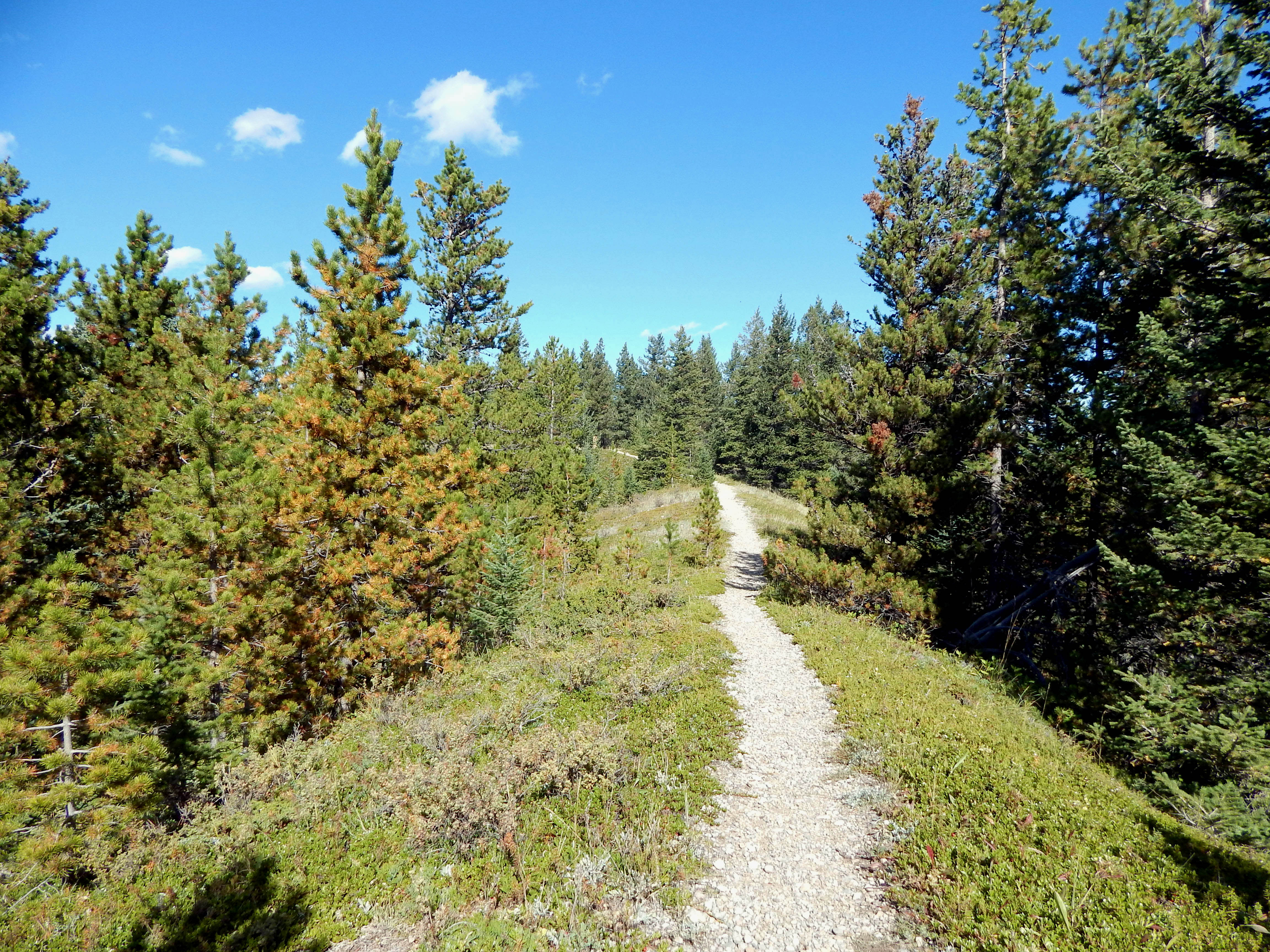
A trail follows the top of an esker in Bow Valley Provincial Park

The mountains that flank the park, such as Mount Yamnuska, consist of resistant Cambrian to Devonian age carbonate rocks that have been placed on top of softer Late Cretaceous sandstones and shales by the McConnell Thrust Fault. That fault also provides a conduit for some of the spring water that surfaces in the Many Springs area of the park.

The spring water at Many Springs has a year-round temperature of about 7 °C (40 °F) and does not freeze in the winter. It originates as precipitation in the surrounding mountains and percolates down to a depth of about 600 m (2,000 ft) where it is warmed by geothermal heat. It then circulates up along the plane of the McConnell Thrust, which passes under the park beneath Many Springs. After mixing with water from the sand and gravel deposits that underlie the Bow Valley, the spring water flows into the lake at a rate of about 100 L/sec (26 gal/sec).

The park also features good examples of fluvioglacial landforms that formed during the retreat of the Bow River valley glacier in the late Pleistocene. These include Middle Lake, which is a kettle lake that was formed by a large block of ice that had become detached from the retreating glacier. The block became surrounded by glacial outwash, and when it melted it left the depression that now holds the lake. There is also a variety of kames, eskers and moraines in the park.

== Flora and fauna ==
After the glacier retreated, the park area was colonized by shrubby pioneer plants that were subsequently replaced by a coniferous forest. The vegetation in the park today is a mix of forested areas and open meadows, and is adapted to cold winters, strong Chinook winds, and hot dry summers.

The forest is dominated by pines and includes spruce, fir, and poplars. Due to strong winds from the west, trees exposed on the tops of ridges commonly lean to the east and lack branches on the windward side. Drier areas of the park are covered by grasses, a wide variety of wildflowers, and low, mat-like juniper shrubs (Juniperus horizontalis). Consistently damp, humid areas like Many Springs host moisture-loving plants like yellow lady's slipper (Cypripedium parviflorum), butterwort (Pinguicula vulgaris), and elephant's head (Pedicularis groenlandica).

Because of the relatively warm water from the springs, the lake at Many Springs does not freeze completely in winter, which makes it attractive to beavers and other animals. Animals are also attracted by the sodium chloride in the spring water that creates salt licks for them. The small blind aquatic isopod Salmasellus steganothrix, which is usually found in caves, lives under rocks in the lake at Many Springs.

== Bow Valley Wildland Provincial Park ==
A much larger area, the Bow Valley Wildland Provincial Park, contains the 575 km^{2} Yamnuska Natural Area that protects the sub-alpine ecosystem of the foothills of the Canadian Rocky Mountains between Kananaskis Country and Banff National Park, which it borders to the west.

== Activities ==
The following activities are available in the park:

- Birdwatching (eagles, hawks, golden eagle)
- Camping
- Canoeing, kayaking and rafting
- Fishing (trout in Bow River)
- Back country and front country hiking (trails include Bow River, Bow Valley, Flowing Water, Many Springs, Middle Lake, Montane, and Moraine)
- Horseback riding
- Mountain biking (on Bow River, Bow Valley, and Moraine trails)
- Rock climbing
- Snowshoeing
- Wildlife viewing (elk, deer, bighorn sheep, beaver, muskrat; bears, cougars, and timber wolves)
- Windsurfing (on Barrier Lake and Lac des Arcs)

== See also ==
- List of Alberta provincial parks
- List of Canadian provincial parks
- List of National Parks of Canada
