= Lac des Arcs =

Lac des Arcs can refer to:

- Lac des Arcs, Alberta, a hamlet in Alberta, Canada
- Lac des Arcs (Alberta), a lake in Alberta, Canada
