= Corral Creek =

Stream in Alberta, Canada

Coordinates: 51.39999°N 116.13548°W

Corral Creek is a tributary of the Bow River in Alberta, Canada.

Corral Creek was named for the fact horses once were corralled there.

== See also ==
- List of rivers of Alberta
