= Beaupré Creek =

Stream in Alberta, Canada

Coordinates: 51.21681°N 114.61872°W

Beaupré Creek is a stream in Alberta, Canada. It is a tributary of the Bow River.

Beaupré Creek has the name of a pioneer citizen.

== See also ==
- List of rivers of Alberta
