= Jacob Creek (Alberta) =

Stream in Alberta, Canada

Coordinates: 51.2001°N 114.81873°W

Jacob Creek is a stream in Alberta, Canada. It is a tributary of the Bow River.

Jacob Creek has the name of a Stoney Indian tribal leader.

== See also ==
- List of rivers of Alberta
