= Chiniki Creek =

Stream in Alberta, Canada

Coordinates: 51.1834°N 114.78533°W

Chiniki Creek is a stream in Alberta, Canada. It is a tributary of the Bow River.

Chiniki Creek was named after of Chief Chiniki, a Stoney tribal leader.

== See also ==
- List of rivers of Alberta
