= Bow River =

River in Alberta, Canada

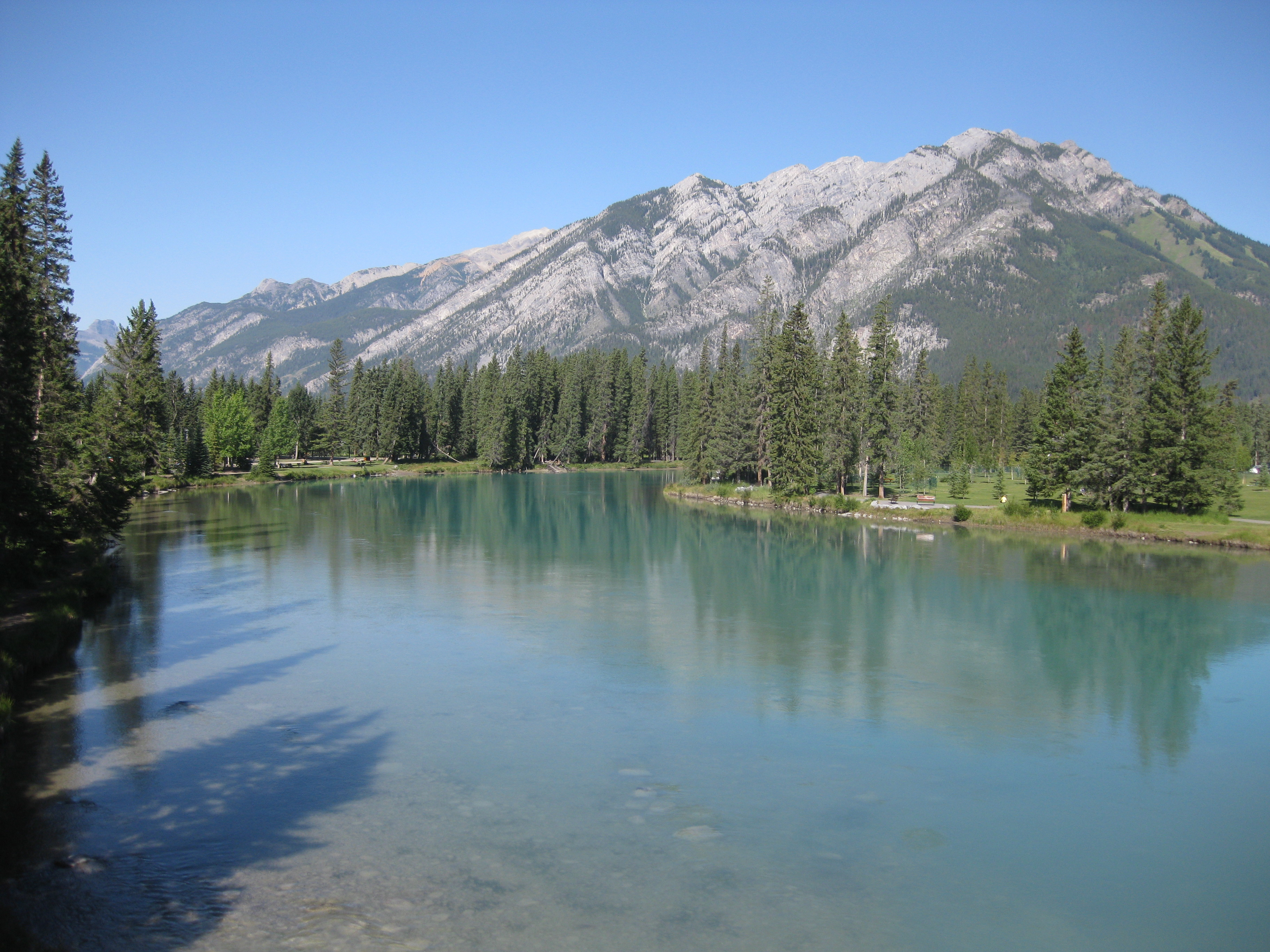
- The Bow River near Banff

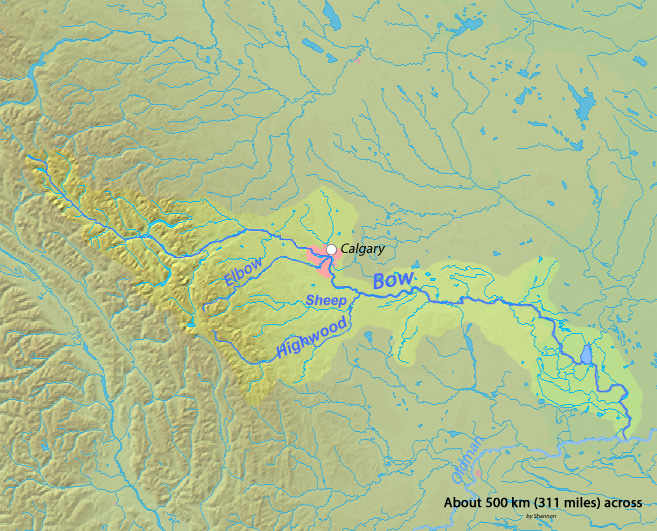
- Map of the Bow River

- River's mouth in Alberta Bow River (Canada)

Location
- Country: Canada
- Province: Alberta

Physical characteristics
- Source: Bow Lake
  - coordinates: 51°39′03″N 116°25′12″W
  - elevation: 1,960 m (6,430 ft)
- Mouth: South Saskatchewan River
  - coordinates: 49°55′42″N 111°41′12″W
  - elevation: 700 m (2,300 ft)
- Length: 587 km (365 mi)
- Basin size: 26,200 km^{2} (10,100 sq mi)
- Discharge
  - average: 129 m^{3}/s (4,600 cu ft/s)
  - minimum: 3 m^{3}/s (110 cu ft/s)
  - maximum: 1,640 m^{3}/s (58,000 cu ft/s)

The headwaters of the Bow River (Stoney Nakoda Îjat̲h̲ibe Wapta and Mînî Thnî Wapta) in Alberta, Canada, start at the Bow Glacier and Bow Lake in Banff National Park in the Canadian Rocky Mountains. The glacial stream that feeds Bow Lake has a mean elevation of 2310 metres above sea level (7578 feet above sea level). From there, the river winds through the Alberta foothills onto the prairies, where it meets the Oldman River, the two then forming the South Saskatchewan River. These waters ultimately flow through the Nelson River into Hudson Bay.

The Bow River Basin is the most highly populated basin in Alberta, with over 1.6 million people living within the watershed. Major population centres along the Bow River, listed from upstream to downstream, include Lake Louise (population 1,004), Banff (population 10,944), Canmore (population 17,200), Cochrane (population 38,014), and Calgary (population 1,481,806).

In addition, the Bow River is an important source of water for irrigation and drinking water. Between 1910 and 1960, the Bow River and its tributaries were engineered to provide hydroelectric power, primarily for Calgary's use. This significantly altered the river's flow and certain ecosystems.^{[3]: 151}

In the Bow River Basin, there are 20 sub-watersheds that drain into the Bow River. From a roughly upstream to downstream direction, these sub-watersheds are:

Watershed name	Area (square kilometres)	Area (square miles)
Upper Bow River	1,463	565
Brewster Creek	756	292
Spray River	782	302
Cascade River	723	279
Bow River and Ghost Reservoir	1,203	464
Kananaskis River	928	358
Ghost River	944	364
Elbow River	1,231	475
Fish Creek	452	174
Sheep River	1,595	616
Highwood River	2,386	921
Crowfoot Creek	1,465	565
West Arrowwood Creek	1,103	426
Jumpingpound Creek	598	231
Nose Creek	978	378
Bow River and Bighill Creek	469	181
Pine Creek	205	79
Middle Bow	2,958	1,142
Lower Bow and 12 Mile Coulee	2,738	1,057
Lower Bow	2,583	997

== Names ==
The Bow River takes its name from the weapons once made from trees that grew on its banks. According to Stoney Nakoda elder Wallace Ear, in the Stoney language the river was known as Îjat̲h̲ibe Wapta, "bow river", referring to the weapons made from saskatoon saplings that grew along the river. However, by the 1980s the river was also known in Stoney as Mînî Thnî Wapta, "cold water river", or simply Mînî Thnî "cold water".

== History ==
First Nations made varied use of the river for sustenance before settlers of European origin arrived, such as using its valleys in the buffalo hunt.

The Bow River Basin is the traditional territory of the Blackfoot Confederacy, comprising the four Blackfoot Nations: Kainaiwa–Blood Tribe, Siksika, Peigan–Piikani and Aamskapi Pikuni. Today, the basin sits within the traditional area of Treaty 7. The Bow River Basin is also home to the Métis Nation Districts 4 (Rocky View Métis District), 5 (Calgary Nose Hill Métis District), and 6 (Calgary Elbow Métis District).

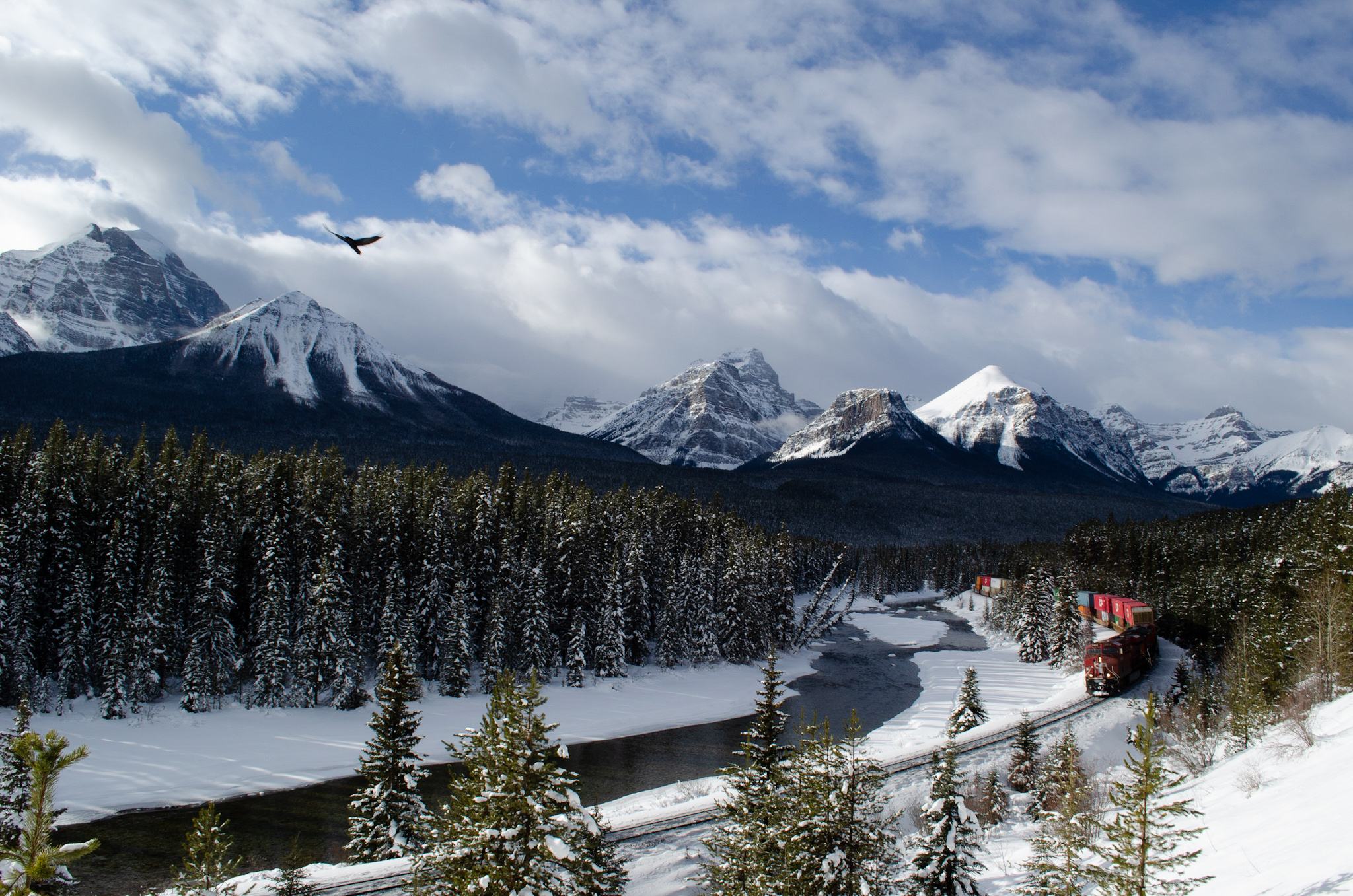
Morant's Curve, Banff National Park

First Nations used the river's valleys for the buffalo hunt, in which herds of buffalo were driven over cliffs or into valleys where they could be killed more easily with bows and arrows. Of all the First Nations groups that lived in the Bow River area, only the Nakoda fished the river regularly. While other groups likely caught fish during harder times, they primarily hunted buffalo during the summer season when fishing would have been most plentiful. The river's water naturally attracted game, which the First Nations men also hunted, while women gathered the roots, nuts and berries and processed them for food. The river's game, its local sources for firewood, and its valleys' shelter made the river a common camp location for First Nations during the prairie winters. The danger of crossing the river meant it was a natural boundary for First Nations. The two main fords of the lower Bow River, Blackfoot Crossing and a ford near the Bow's confluence with the Elbow River (where today's central Calgary developed), became important gathering points for First Nations to exchange goods and celebrate festivities. Blackfoot Crossing was used by the Siksika as a winter campsite and is today a part of their reserve.

The fur trader James Gaddy and the Hudson's Bay Company explorer David Thompson are traditionally considered to be the first people of European origin to see the Bow River. They camped along the Bow with a group of Piikani during the 1787–88 winter.

Fur traders began to move to the Bow River region following Thompson's expedition, but the river was not used extensively in the fur trade. First Nations already weakened by settlers' near-annihilation of the buffalo and disease were further devastated by the introduction of the whisky trade. Fort Whoop-Up was established in 1869, and whisky traders were active along the Bow River during the 1870s. To stop these operations, the recently formed North-West Mounted Police (later the RCMP) established Fort Calgary in 1875 at the confluence of the Elbow River and the Bow.

In order to proceed with railway construction through present-day Alberta and an orderly settlement of the Bow region, the government sought to extinguish title of First Nations to specific lands, and negotiated to do so through treaties. With white settlers becoming increasingly common in the region and almost completely wiping out the buffalo population, the Nakoda, Tsuu Tʼina, Kainai, Piikanai, and Siksika met with representatives of the Canadian government at Blackfoot Crossing on the Bow River and signed Treaty 7 on 22 September 1877, ceding lands in exchange for defined reserves. From the perspective of the Canadian government, these groups had surrendered all their land privileges outside their reserves. The reserves of the Nakoda, Tsuu Tʼina, and Siksika were established along the Bow River.

=== Hydroelectric development, 1910–1960 ===
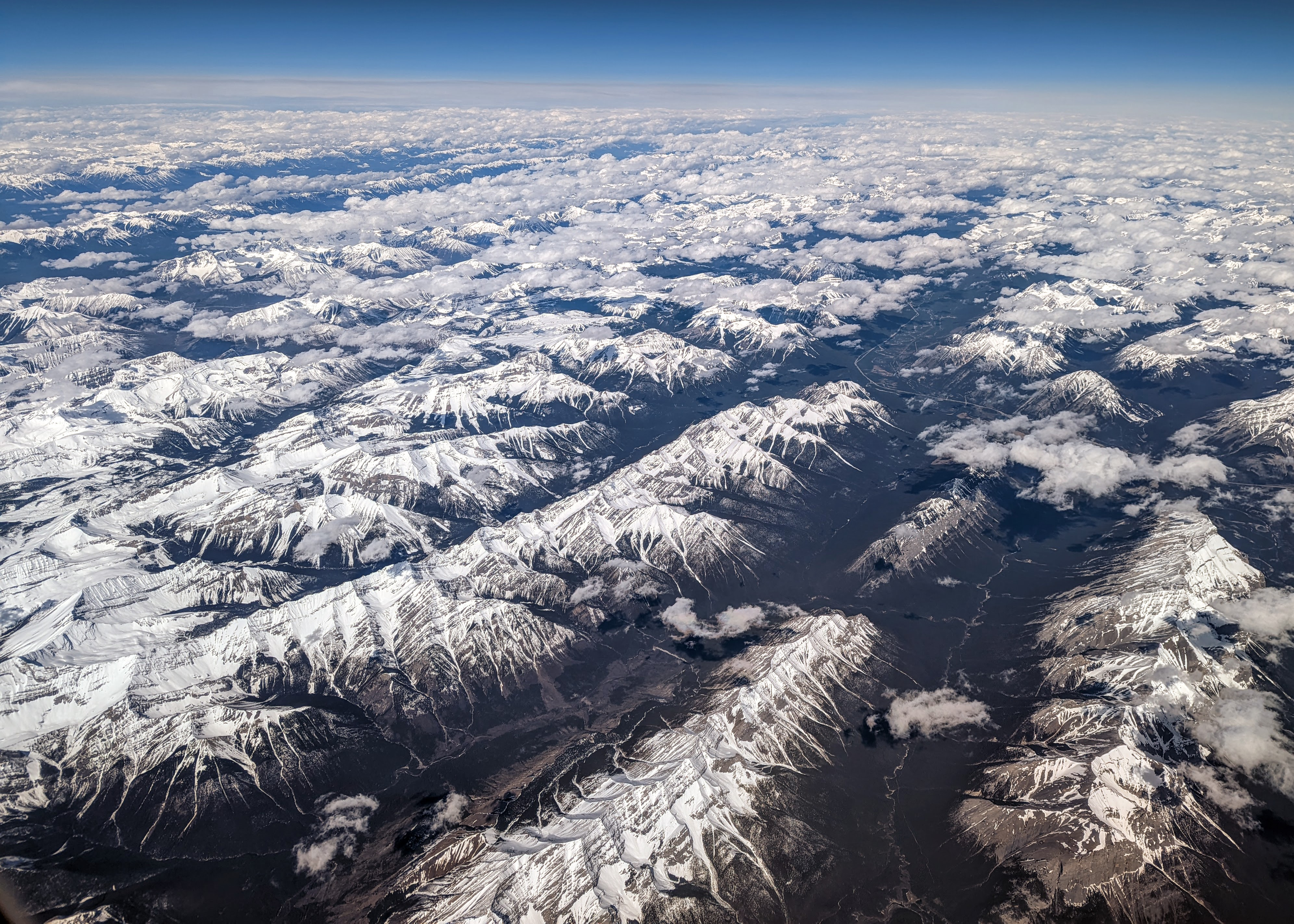
Mountains around Banff, with Spray River flowing north to the Bow River at Banff (a small cloud obscures Banff itself)

Calgary was growing rapidly after 1900. The city businessmen pressed for dam construction to generate cheaper power from hydroelectric sources. William Maxwell Aitken, later with R. B. Bennett, formed Calgary Power in 1910. That year, on property purchased from the Nakoda, Calgary Power began constructing Alberta's first major hydroelectric plant, Horseshoe Dam.

Calgary Power had problems before this dam was completed in 1911. The Bow River originates from a northern mountain, and its flow varies considerably depending upon the amount and location of winter snowfalls. A comprehensive study of the Bow's flow measurements had not been conducted. In its operations, Calgary Power relied upon estimates of the river's minimum flow during winter conditions. Thus, despite the amount of energy the company had contracted, it could not reliably fulfill these obligations during winters. With capital already invested in Horseshoe, Calgary Power opened another hydroelectric plant and reservoir two years later at Kananaskis Falls just upstream from Horseshoe Falls. A storage reservoir was also created within Banff National Park in 1912 at Lake Minnewanka. Despite this additional reservoir and both plants, Calgary Power still struggled to fulfill its power contracts during winter months. In the 1920s, the company began planning new projects to control the Bow River.

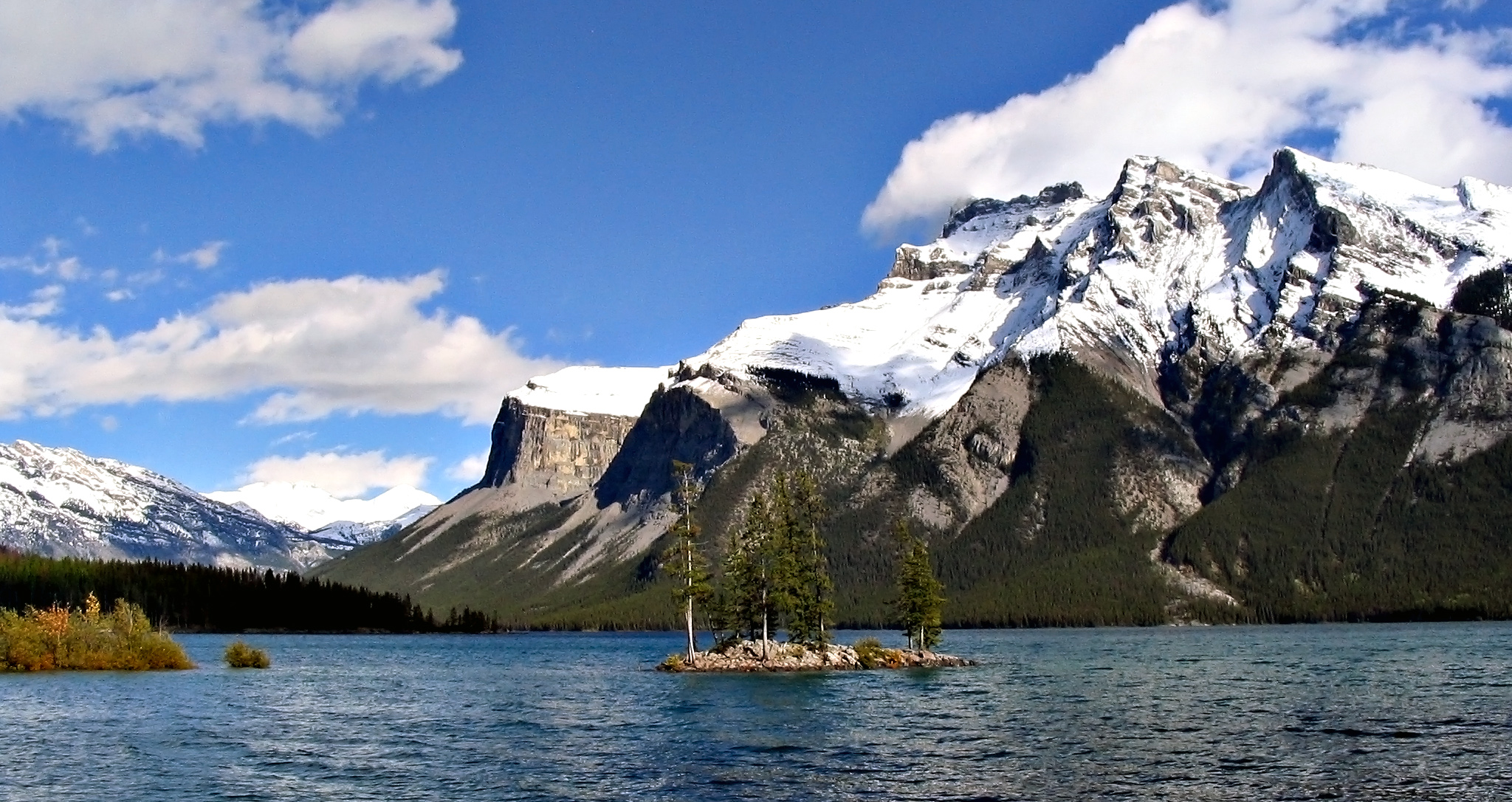
Lake Minnewanka

The Bow River's hydroelectric development both conforms to and contrasts with elements of conservationist ideology in the United States during this era. This ideology espoused that rational and planned resource development guided by technicians should benefit the greatest number of people possible. In this light, rivers could be seen as a series of interdependent parts, and engineering all of them could give technicians control over the system as a whole for the benefit of society.

In this process, Calgary Power ultimately fulfilled conservationist ideology as it increasingly brought the Bow River's interdependent sectors, and thus it as a whole, under control, while failing to embody conservationist ideals of rationally developing the Bow initially. Also in line with conservationism, bureaucrats allowing the construction of the Minnewanka reservoir espoused that the nation's development as a whole superseded the need to protect a small part of Banff National Park's nature.

Calgary Power's ad hoc hydroelectric development of the Bow continued. Ghost Dam was built in 1929; a major development on the Bow's tributary, Spray River, was completed in 1951; and, at the behest of the provincial government, Bearspaw Dam was built in 1954 just west of Calgary to control flooding (the dam included a generating station) and 1955 saw the development of two reservoirs on the Kananaskis River in what is now Peter Lougheed Provincial Park World War II's industrial demand increased pressure on the river: another hydroelectric development was built within Banff National Park, this time on the Cascade River, a tributary of the Bow.

Between 1910 and 1960, the Bow River was radically changed as it was systematically engineered to control its water flow and provide hydroelectric power. The seasonal summer flooding in Calgary was an issue of the past. Water was held by reservoirs during spring and summer, permitting steady power generation during fall and winter. Comparing 1924–33 to 1954–63, the Bow River's January flow had approximately doubled 30 years later. Parts of the river, such as that preceding Ghost Dam, had practically turned into lakes. These developments had ecological effects, too. For example, reservoirs allowed certain fish species, such as the brown trout, to outcompete others, while other species virtually disappeared.

=== Environmentalism ===
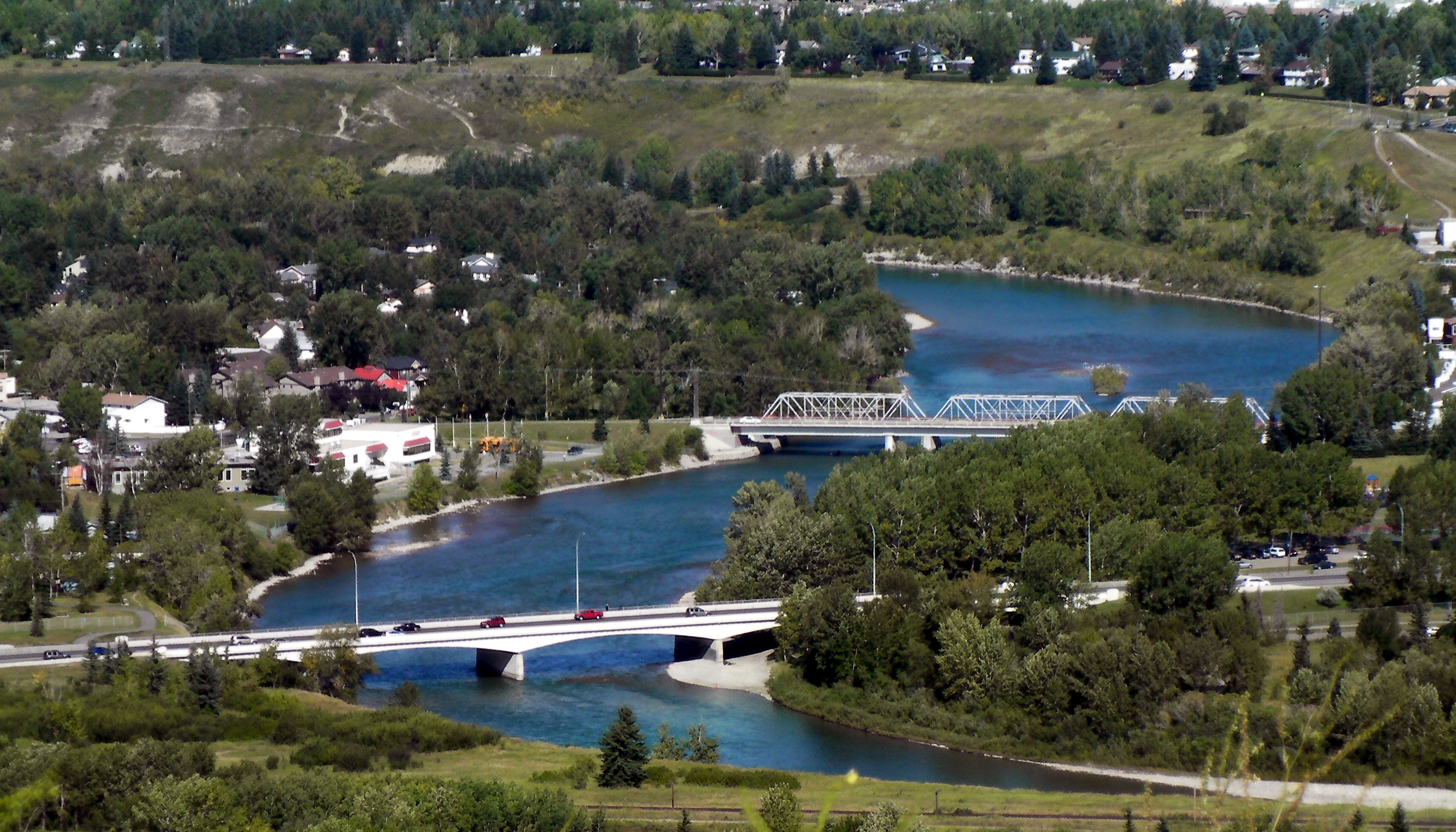
The river flows through Bowness, Calgary.

By the 1950s, the Bow River's south bank in Calgary was a generally derelict commercial zone. The Calgary Local Council of Women was the most vocal advocate for turning this area into a park system as a part of a broader campaign for improved public and social services. Calgary City Council agreed to the idea in 1955, but by 1959 little progress had been made to fund the project. To accommodate increasing traffic flow through the growing city, the Canadian Pacific Railway and the city began negotiating a CPR reroute that would follow the south bank of the Bow River, turning it into a parkway and the CPR's rail mainline. Among the plan's critics was the Local Council of Women, reminding the city of its 1955 promise for a river park. After negotiations between the CPR and Calgary ended in failure in 1964, urban elites, such as golf clubs, increasingly endorsed the Local Council of Women's idea for a riverfront park system.

Park advocates defined the Bow River within Calgary as the city's nature: it was something to be protected for and enjoyed by the public. However, as progress was made in the parks' creation, this "environmental" view of the Bow's nature proved selective. For example, trees were not to be cut down, but landscaping to accommodate cyclists was endorsed. In short, the river was valued above all when it suited human goals. Calgary eventually developed an extensive plan for the Bow River's park system, and it is considered an important element of Calgary's self-image today.

The grassroots advocacy done by the Local Council of Women denotes emerging environmental sensibilities that are representative of larger trends occurring in North America during this period. Samuel Hays associated such movements with the emergence of an advanced consumer society. Unlike the pre-World War II elitist ideology of conservationist production, this emergent approach in North America was of grassroots consumers democratically engaging in environmental issues, and there was often tension between the public and managers of the environment.

After an Alberta Environment official discovered a toxic "blob" in the Bow in October 1989, human needs again were given priority. Originating from an abandoned wood-preserving plant on the Bow River's bank, the "blob" in the river had released a carcinogenic plume that stretched more than 250 kilometres (160 mi) downstream. Its discovery caused alarm in the media and amongst those living along the Bow River (two years earlier, 70 percent of Calgarians reported using the Bow recreationally).

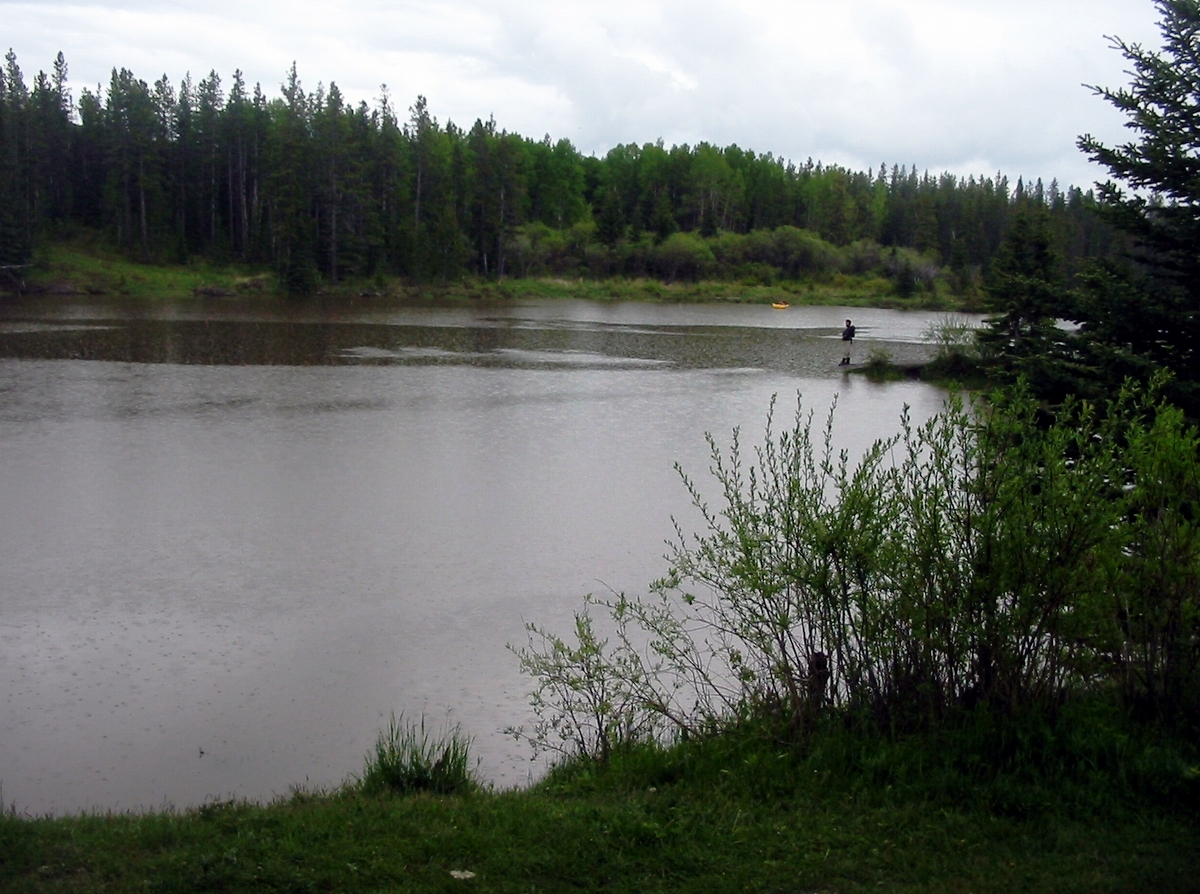
through Edworthy Park in Calgary

As a result, Alberta's premier, Ralph Klein, established the Bow River Water Quality Council as a provincial advisory body. The council was to promote awareness of the river's water quality and try to improve it through fact-finding and aiding inter-institutional coordination. It was composed of representatives from diverse interests such as First Nations, agriculture, and municipalities. Recreational groups represented on the council, such as Ducks Unlimited and Bow Waters Canoe Club, expressed concern for the river's environment. Their attitudes were not strictly human-centric, but, like those favouring a park system in Calgary, they defined the Bow River's environment as something worth preserving for human use.

Greater changes in attitude toward the river were manifest in the Bow River Water Quality Council's reports over time. By 1994, the reports emphasized the importance of the Bow's ecological balance as a whole for maintaining its water quality and quantity. In the mid-1990s, the upper Bow River began being treated explicitly biocentrically. This was part of the larger pursuit of treating Banff National Park's ecosystems as something intrinsically valuable: maintaining these ecosystems was now prioritized over human enjoyment of the parks.

=== 2013 floods ===
In June 2013, southern Alberta had such heavy rainfall that catastrophic flooding occurred throughout much of the southern half of the province along the Bow, Elbow, Highwood and Oldman rivers and tributaries. A dozen municipalities declared local states of emergency on June 20 as water levels rose, and numerous communities were placed under evacuation orders.

=== Banff ===
==== Designation as a national park ====
In 1887 the Canadian parliament, under the urging of the Canadian Pacific Railway vice-president, William Van Horne, and the federal land agent, William Pearce, created Rocky Mountains Park, later renamed Banff National Park. Originally 647 square kilometres (250 mi^{2}), it was Canada's first national park and included part of the Bow River. Eventually the park grew to include the Bow Glacier, an outflow of the Wapta Icefield and the source of the Bow River.

The designation of the national park marked a turning point in the public's perception of the Bow River. The river began to be appreciated for its aesthetic value in addition to its industrial and agricultural uses. Officials of the Canadian Pacific Railway, the company who led the development of Banff, realized this element. When work began on a new luxury hotel in Banff in 1886–87, Van Horne personally redesigned and reoriented the plans so that the guests of the hotel would be able to see the vista of the Bow River. Many early postcards from Banff, as well as some current ones, prominently featured the Bow River.

==== Sustainability as a national park ====
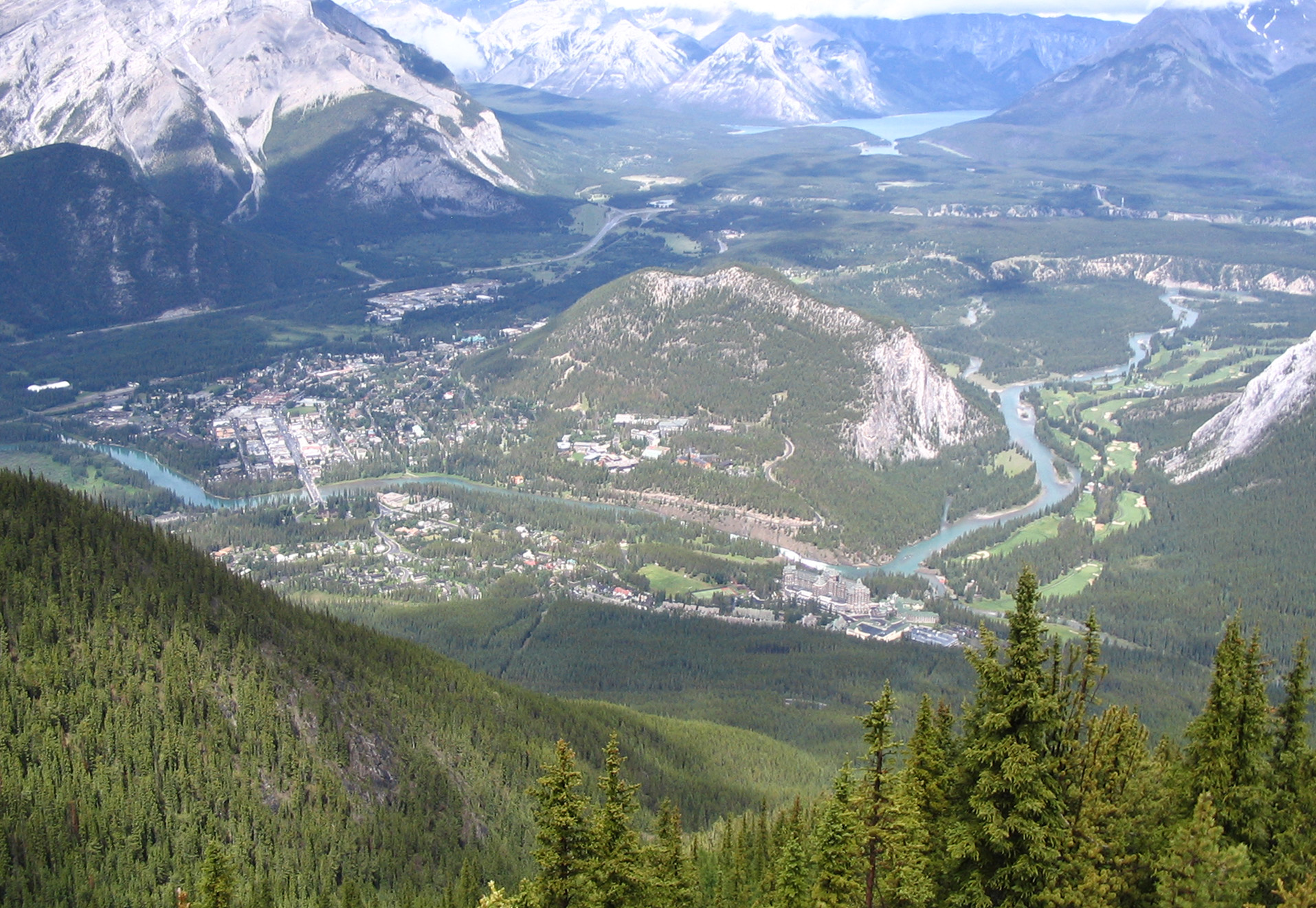
Bow Valley and the town of Banff

From the 1920s forward, the National Parks of Canada began to focus on the economic benefits of accessible, mass marketable tourism. Changes included new highways and the creation of storage reservoirs for the water needed to sustain the burgeoning community. The Bow River was now seen both for its aesthetic qualities and for new utilitarian aspects.

By the 1950s Banff's raw sewage began to be discharged into the Bow River. Because of the self-purification powers of the cold, braided water, however, the Bow was incredibly effective as a natural sewage-treatment facility. Tourists and residents were often unaware of the transformation of the Bow River into a sewage system.

As Banff continued to grow, the river continued to digest the increased volume of sewage. This practice, however, began to touch an ideological nerve among the tourists and residents of Banff. Pouring raw sewage into one of the main attractions of the park polluted both the river and, more importantly, the image of Banff. There was also fear that continued reliance on the Bow as a natural sewer would either cap the development of Banff or eventually have great risk to public health. By the 1960s, the town built a modern sewage facility and stopped releasing untreated waters into the Bow. The river's aesthetic qualities had increasing priority in terms of effects of development within the borders of a National Park.

== Irrigation and development ==
The Bow River contains seven dams and weirs on its main stream and ten other dams on its tributaries. In response to the 2013 Alberta floods a new reservoir storage is being proposed on the river. Three options were being considered including a new dam near Mînî Thnî, an expanded Ghost Dam or a new dam near Glenbow.

Dams on the main stream from upstream to downstream
Name	Height	Capacity (MW)	Year of completion	Owner	Reservoir formed	Primary purposes
Kanasaskis Dam	8 m	21	1913	TransAlta	Seebe Reservoir	Electricity
Horseshoe Falls Dam	17 m	16	1911	TransAlta	Unnamed	Electricity
Morley Dam	49 m	44	In planning, (2032 if built)	Government of Alberta		Flood control, electricity
Ghost Dam	30 m	56	1929	TransAlta	Ghost Lake	Electricity, recreation and flood control
Glenbow Dam	37 m	28	In planning (2032 if built)	Government of Alberta		Flood control, recreation and electricity
Bearspaw Dam	10 m	17	1954	TransAlta	Bearspaw Reservoir	Drinking water and electricity
Calgary Weir	6 m	0	1944	Western Irrigation District		Irrigation
Carseland Wier	3 m	0	1968	Bow River Irrigation District		Irrigation
Bassano Dam	12 m	0	1935	Eastern Irrigation District	Unnamed	Irrigation

The Bow River supplies the water for three irrigation districts in southern Alberta: the Eastern, Western, and Bow River irrigation districts.

=== Eastern Irrigation District ===
The Eastern Irrigation District (EID), headquartered in Brooks, Alberta, was originally part of land that the federal government granted to the Canadian Pacific Railway in lieu of a portion of the payment for the construction of the railway. In 1929 the CPR split the property into two parts and divested itself of both sections. In 1935 a delegation of irrigation farmers took control of the eastern section and established the EID.

The EID, diverting its water at the Bassano and Newell dams, is the largest private land owner in Alberta. Recently the EID began promoting the recreational possibilities that have developed alongside the district's irrigation development. The EID currently owns and operates the Rolling Hills Reservoir Campground. In 1951, the province of Alberta also established Kinbrook Island Provincial Park on the eastern bank of the Newell reservoir, which has been stocked with native species of fish.

=== Western Irrigation District ===
The Western Irrigation District (WID), headquartered in Strathmore, Alberta, was the second half of the land divested by the CPR. The WID was established in 1944.

The water of the WID, diverted at the Calgary Weir, is instrumental to southern Alberta agriculture and, unlike the other two districts, supports the urban needs city of Calgary. It is able to supply both agricultural and urban needs since the WID has higher levels of rainfall than the other two districts, and it receives much of Calgary's storm water.

=== Bow River Irrigation District ===
The Bow River Irrigation District (BRID), headquartered in Vauxhall, Alberta, was created in 1968, making it the most recent district to be supplied by the Bow. The BRID diverts the Bow at the Carseland weir and also uses the McGregor, Travers, and Little Bow dams. Each has a reservoir that is also used for recreational purposes.

In March 2012, the citizens of the BRID voted in favour of expanding the area of the district by 110 square kilometres (28,000 acres). An expansion of 85 square kilometres (21,000 acres) passed in 2004 as well. This means that, for the second time in eight years, the BRID increased its demand on the Bow River by roughly 10 percent.

=== Irrigation today ===
Of the 45 crops that are grown in the Bow River basin, only 10 could be produced without irrigation.

Because of the dependence of the region on Bow River irrigation water, in the early 21st century all three irrigation districts began to make major changes in order to continue to serve their large mandated areas. In 2006, as a part of the "Water for Life Initiative", the Alberta government placed a moratorium on any new licences for water use from the Bow, Oldman, and South Saskatchewan River basins. The government also requested that the three irrigation districts increase their efficiency by 30 percent. The irrigation districts are improving their irrigation system by changing most canals to pipelines in order to decrease contamination, spillage, and loss of water to evaporation. A drawback of this change is that trees must be cleared to prevent roots from damaging the pipeline, changing the habitat.

in 1987 the EID in association with the Alberta Fish and Wildlife Division and Ducks Unlimited Canada established a partnership to create additional wildlife habitat within the Eastern Irrigation District's boundaries. This demonstrated the EID's goal of encouraging wildlife in order to contribute to the growth of its tourist sector. Hunting and fishing are now promoted on the EID's website.

== Water Quality ==
Water quality in the Bow River, as in all rivers, is influenced by several factors. The surficial geology and soils of the catchment basin, the plant and animal communities, seasonal differences, precipitation and flow all are natural factors that impact water quality. Human activities impact water quality by clearing land, agricultural uses, dams, and urbanization.

Key water quality parameters are regularly monitored in the different sub-watersheds of the Bow River. The government of Alberta puts out guidelines for these water quality parameters, which include:

Parameter	Description
Ammonia	Type of nitrogen, high levels cause eutrophication and toxicity
Chloride	High levels cause toxicity to aquatic life
Carbon, Total Organic	Measures organic material in water
Escherichia coli (E. coli)	Indicates fecal contamination, risks to human health
Nitrate	Type of nitrogen, high levels can cause eutrophication
Nitrogen (Total)	All nitrogen compounds, high levels can cause eutrophication
pH	Measurement of how acidic or basic water is
Phosphorus (Dissolved)	High levels can cause eutrophication
Phosphorus (Total)	High levels can cause eutrophication
Total Suspended Solids	High levels can harm aquatic life
Turbidity	High levels can harm aquatic life
Sodium Adsorption Ratio	Measures suitability for drinking and irrigation
Specific conductance	Measures salts in water
Sulphate	High levels cause toxicity to aquatic life

Water quality in the Bow River changes seasonally, and along its length. In general, water quality along the entire length of the Bow River is good, but there are some parameters that occasionally cause concerns:

Ammonia can enter water due to natural breakdown of organic material, from agricultural runoff and from industrial processes, but this compound is rarely at levels high enough to cause concern in the Bow River.

Chlorides can come from natural sources but in the Bow River Basin, mostly enter the Bow River when roads are salted in the winter. Chlorides are higher within and just downstream of the City of Calgary, and this parameter has occasionally exceeded provincial guideline levels.

Total organic carbon comes from organic material entering the river. There is rarely enough organic carbon in the Bow River to cause concern.

E. coli enters the Bow River from wild and domestic animal feces and human sewage. E. coli levels are occasionally above levels recommended for recreational waters, especially within and downstream of the City of Calgary.

Total nitrogen and nitrate enter the Bow River from atmospheric deposition, degradation of organic material, fertilizer runoff and sewage discharges. Levels of nitrogen in the Bow River are generally low, even below wastewater treatment plants in the City of Calgary and in agricultural areas.

Dissolved and total phosphorus levels enter the Bow River from sewage and agricultural runoff, and levels of these compounds can be high in the agricultural areas of the lower Bow River.

The sodium adsorption ratio indicates the amount of sodium relative to calcium and magnesium in water. This is an indicator of how good the water is for irrigation, and this indicator rarely causes concern in the Bow River.

Total suspended solids and turbidity are due to particles entering the Bow River. These are generally high during the spring snowmelt, as runoff brings soil into the river. However, these parameters can also become high if construction or other soil disturbances cause soil to enter the river. This can occur anywhere along the length of the river.

Sulphates can enter water from weathering of natural minerals and also from industrial sources. Sulphates are high at some locations in the Bow River basin, but the reasons are not very clear.

== Recreation ==
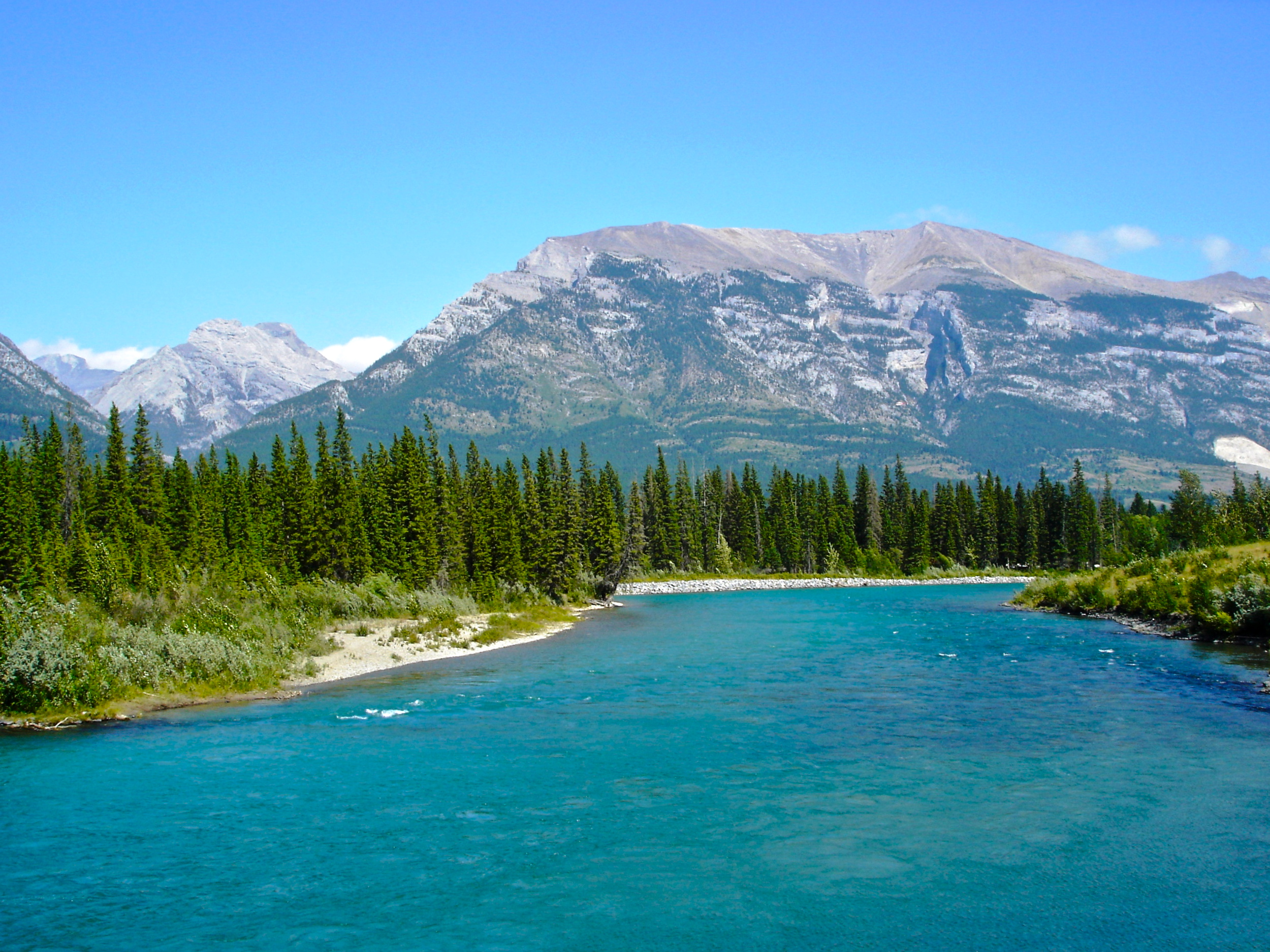
The Bow River near Canmore

The Bow River provides habitat for wildlife and many opportunities for recreation such as fishing and boating. Both fly fishermen and spinner fishermen share the river in all four seasons of the year. Serious anglers from all over the world visit the Bow River for its thriving population of brown trout and rainbow trout. Mainly the river is fished south of the city of Calgary, past where the water treatment sites dump into the river. The volume of nutrients and number of fish are higher there.

Outdoor adventurers use primarily three types of boats to enjoy the river, the inflatable boat, the johnboat and the canoe. There are several spots on the river to launch watercraft, including Graves Landing, Highway 22X Bridge, Policeman's Flats and McKinnon Flats.

The Bow River pathway, is developed on both banks of the river throughout the city of Calgary and is used for cycling, hiking, jogging, as well as rollerblading and skateboarding. Along the Bow River pathway, many people partake in canoeing, kayaking, rafting, paddle boarding, and other activities on the water. Dog owners and families often use the river banks and beaches for outdoor recreation.

=== Recreation and industrial development ===
The recreation and tourism sector of the Bow developed closely alongside the river's water irrigation projects.

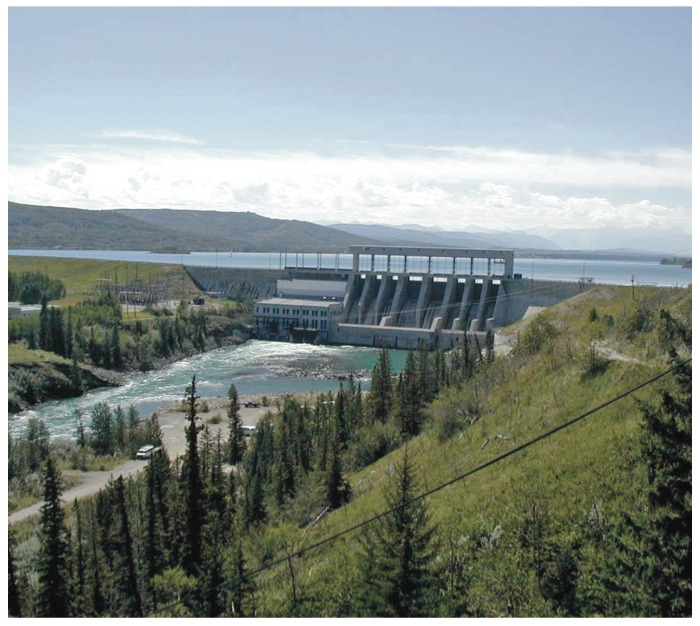
Ghost Dam

Projects such as the McGregor, Chestermere, and Ghost dams were originally built for either agricultural or electrical purposes but are also important for the recreational facilities they offer. Since their construction, the dams along the Bow River have played a central role in the development of the adjacent communities.

Two key examples that demonstrate the connection of recreation and tourism with irrigation are the Chestermere and Bassano dams. Following the construction of the Chestermere Dam in 1907, housing developments began to occur around the neighbouring lake and in 1992, because of these developments, Chestermere was declared a town. Similarity, after a three-year refurbishing project ending in 1987, the town of Bassano, about 8 kilometres (5 mi) northeast of the dam, began advertising the Bassano dam as a tourist attraction for the town. At this point the Bassano dam now also started offering group tours, fishing and picnic areas, and a scenic viewpoint.

Communities have also recently begun to appear around Ghost Dam as well.

=== Calgary's weir project (Harvie Passage) ===
In 1904 the Bow River Weir was constructed close to Calgary's downtown core in order to divert water into the Western Irrigation District. Since its construction a side effect of the weir had been that it created a circulating wave, with a lethal and powerful undertow, immediately downstream of it. Because rafting, canoeing, and kayaking down the Bow River are such popular summer activities, there had been many fatalities. Furthermore, because fish were not able to pass through the structure, they too became trapped in the circulating wave and a dense, unnatural concentration of pelicans congregated immediately following the weir.

In order to combat the circulating wave and undertow, in August 2007 the province of Alberta through the Alberta Lottery fund, in conjunction with the Calgary Foundation and the City of Calgary, began construction of the Bow River Weir paddle around, named the Harvie Passage. The passage allowed for the wave to be dispersed over a set of several smaller rapids while still supplying water to its irrigation district. Altogether, the paddle around cost $18 million and was completed in the spring of 2012.

In June 2013, just a year after the project was completed, Calgary was hit with an epic 100 year flood, and all of the Harvie Passage work was destroyed. After that flood, the passage was closed to the public and a safety boom ahead of the rapids was re-installed. It was estimated that rebuilding the Harvie Passage to the original intent of the project (completed in 2012) would cost $23.4 million.

By 2021, construction on the Harvie Passage was complete. The passage was redesigned to withstand a flood similar to the one that damaged the previous structures.

== Ecology ==
A type of diatom called Didymosphenia geminata, a type of algae commonly called "rock snot", grows in the Bow River and many of the tributaries. This diatom will occasionally form large blooms which are unsightly but do not appear to do damage to fish stocks. Despite fears that this diatom is invasive, there is evidence that it has been present in the Bow Basin since at least 1860, when it was known as Gomphonema geminatum, and is present in the fossil record in Alberta, Canada.

== Tributaries ==
Banff National Park

- Mosquito Creek
- Noseeum Creek
- Missing Lake
- Pipestone River
  - Molar Creek, Little Pipestone Creek
- Paradise Creek
- Corral Creek
- Moraine Creek
- Baker Creek
  - Wildflower Creek
- Taylor Creek
- Silverton Creek
- Altrude Creek
- Johnston Creek
- Redearth Creek
  - Pharaoh Creek
- Wolverine Creek
- Ranger Creek
- Healy Creek
  - Brewster Creek, Howard Douglas Creek, Fatigue Creek
- Sundance Creek
- Forty Mile Creek
- Spray River
- Cascade River
- Carrot Creek

Foothills and plains

- Policeman Creek
- Cougar Creek
- Three Sisters Creek
- Stewart Creek
- Wind Creek
  - Pigeon Creek
- Grotto Creek
- Exshaw Creek
- Heart Creek
- Jura Creek
- Kananaskis River
- Joshua Creek
- Chiniki Creek
- Jacob Creek
- Ghost River
- Spencer Creek
- Beaupre Creek
- Grand Valley Creek
- McClennan Creek
- Horse Creek
- Jumpingpound Creek
  - Towers Creek, Pile of Bones Creek, Park Creek
- Bighill Creek
- Elbow River
- Nose Creek
  - West Nose Creek
- W.I.D. Canal
- Pine Creek
- Highwood River
- Arrowwood Creek
- Crowfoot River
- Matzhiwin Creek

Many lakes, glacial and artificial are found in the Bow Valley: Bow Lake, Hector Lake, Vermilion Lakes, Gap Lake, Lac des Arcs, and Ghost Lake on the upper course, and a few man-made reservoirs along the lower course.

== Gallery ==
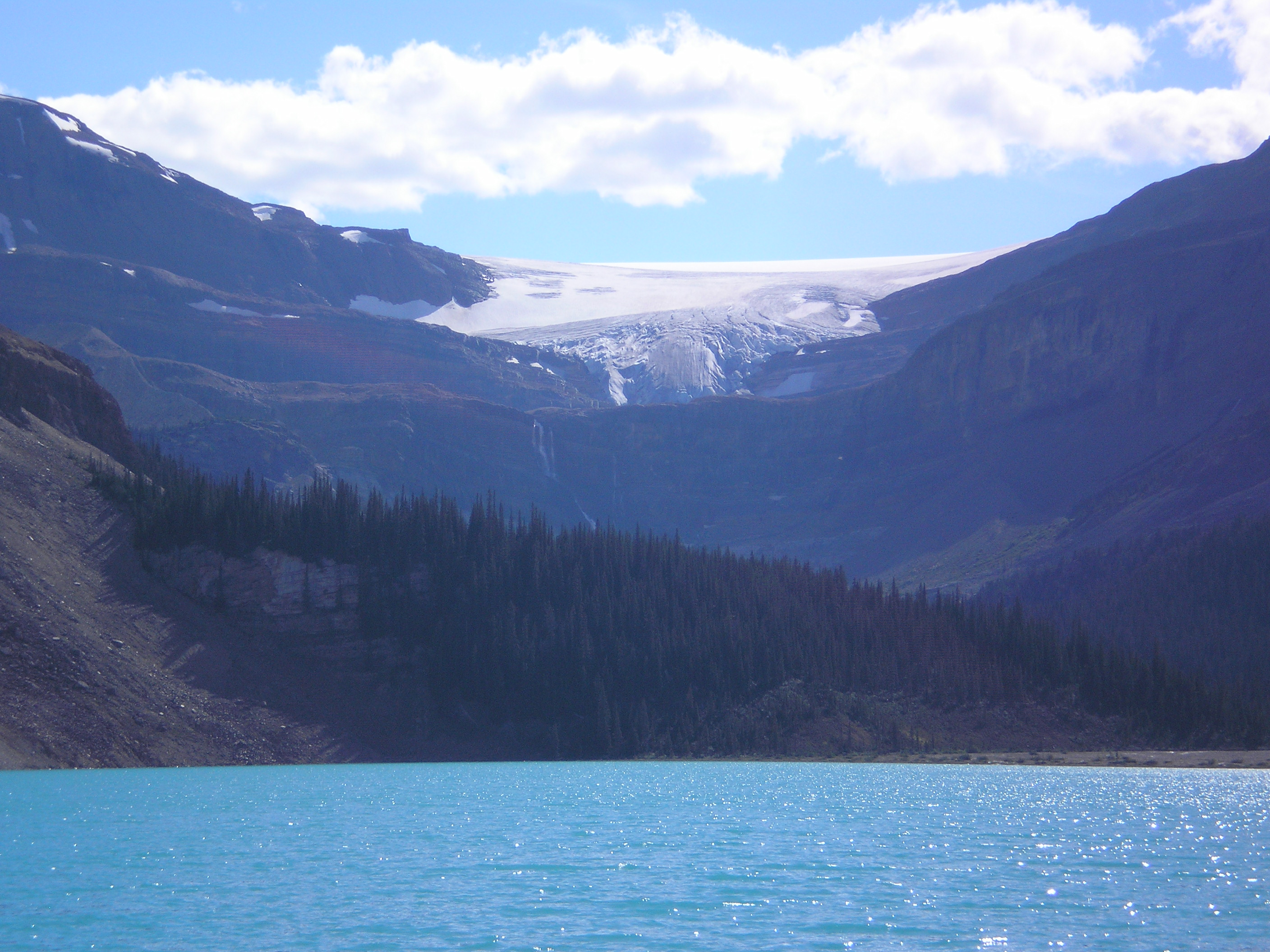
Bow Glacier

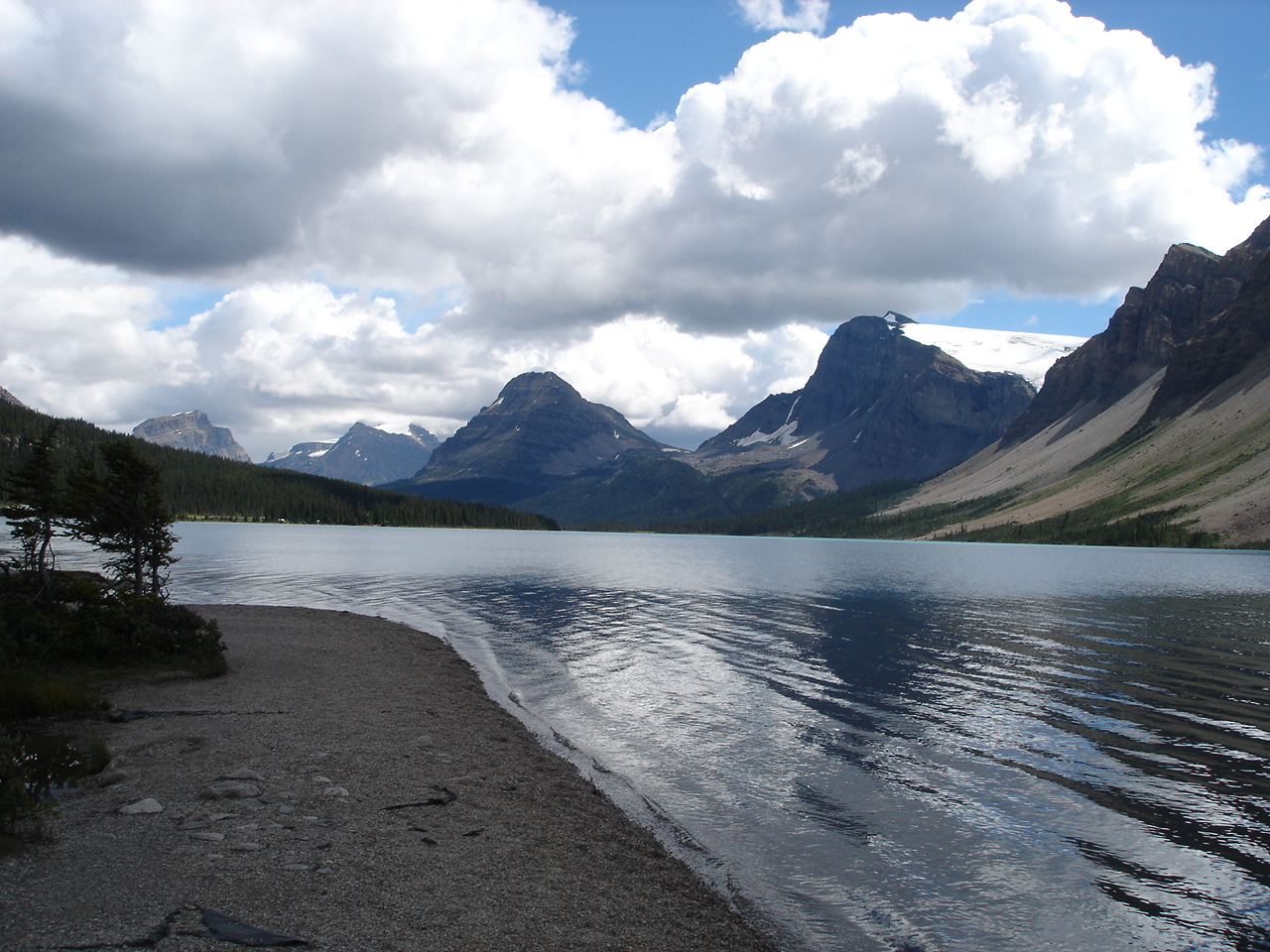
Bow River originates in Bow Lake.

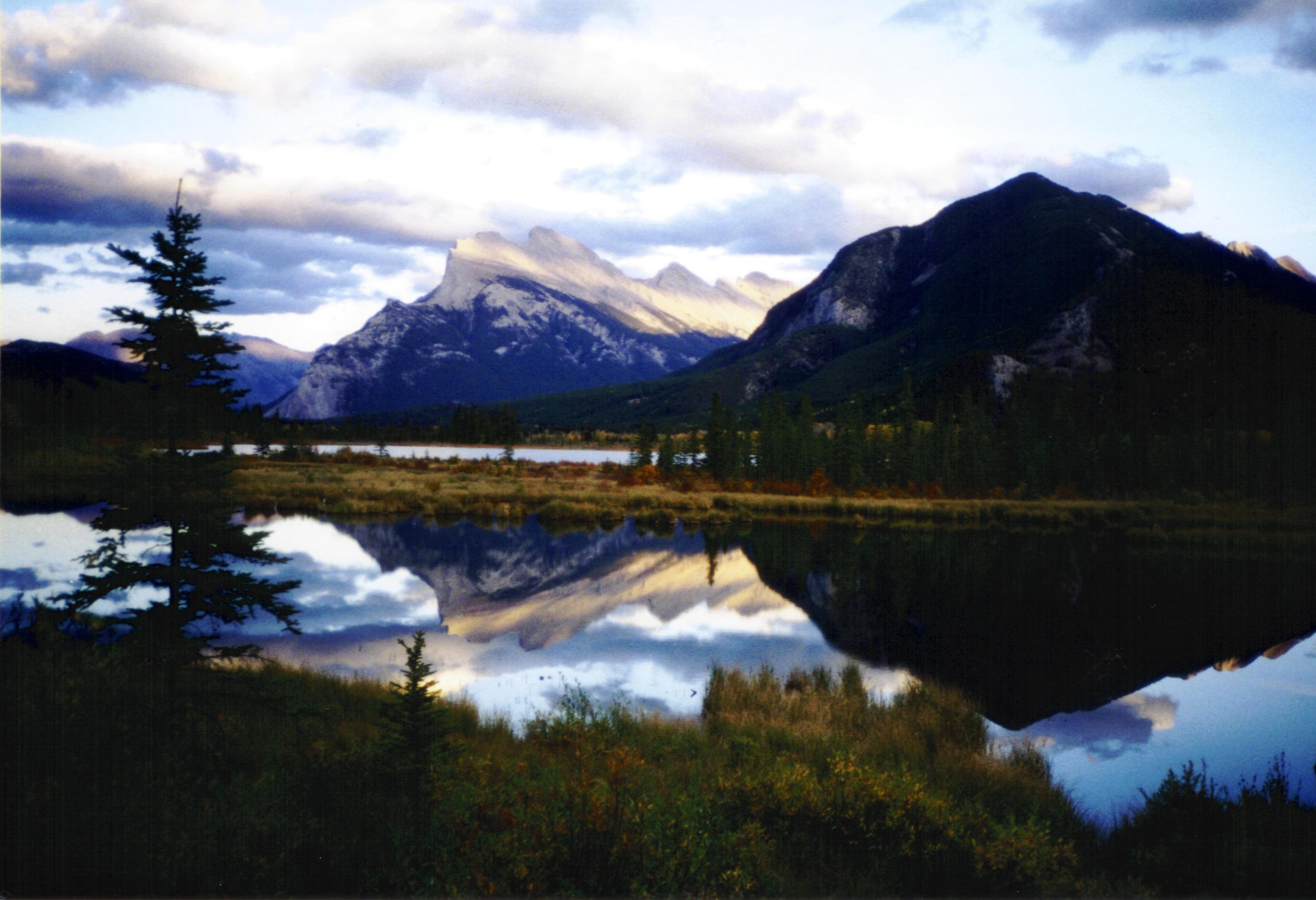
Vermilion Lakes formed along the Bow River

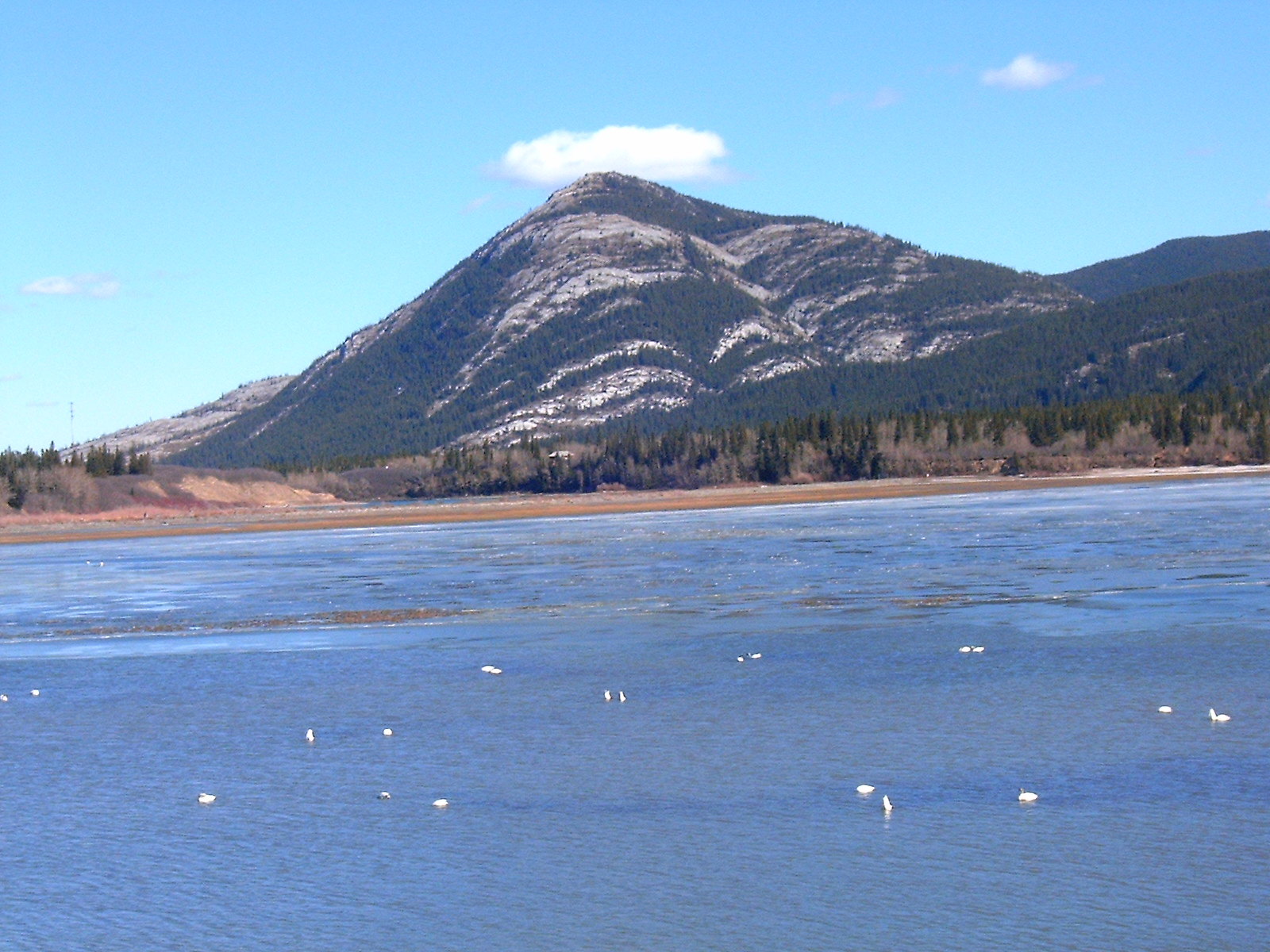
Lac des Arcs formed along Bow River

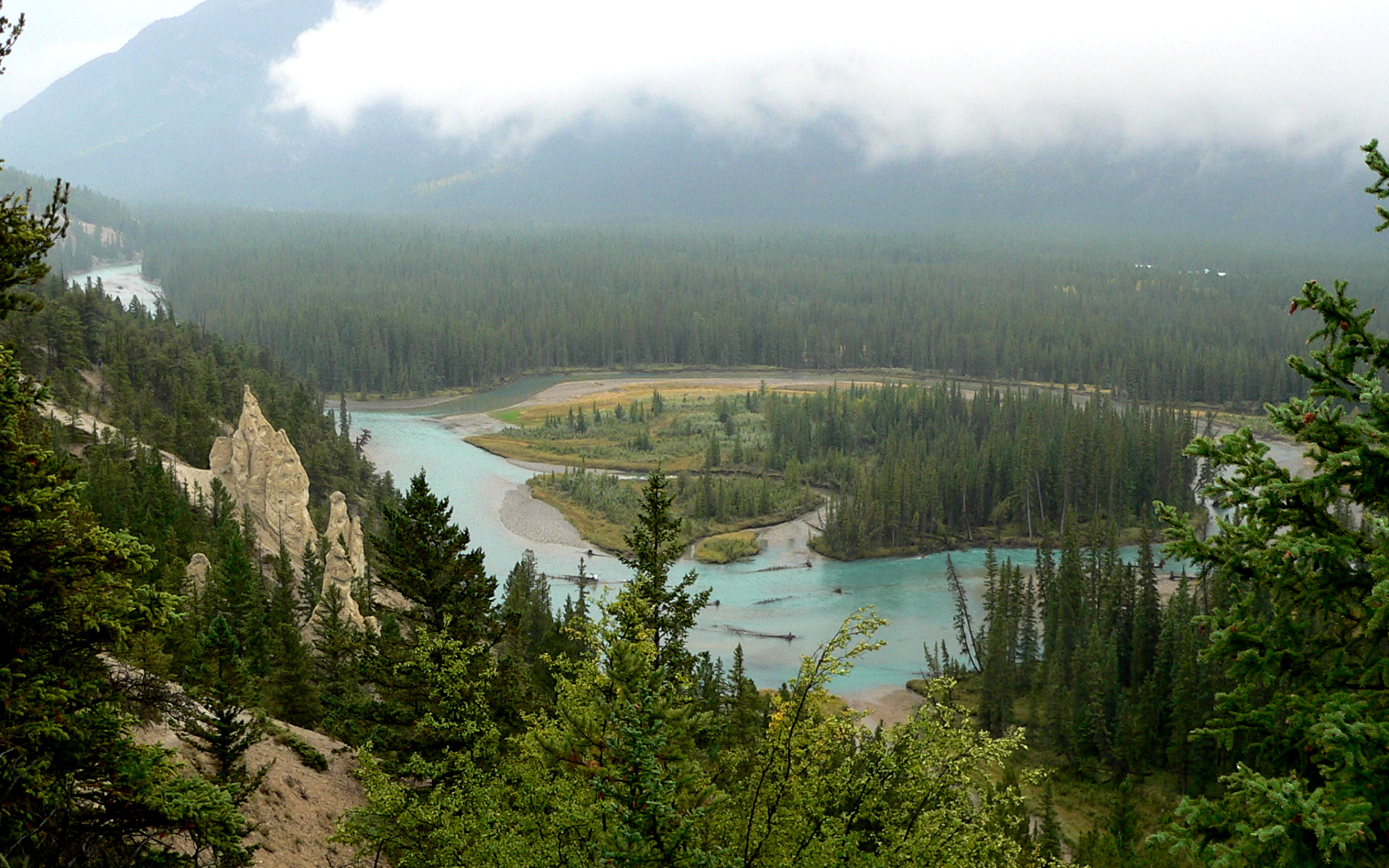
Hoodoos above the Bow River.

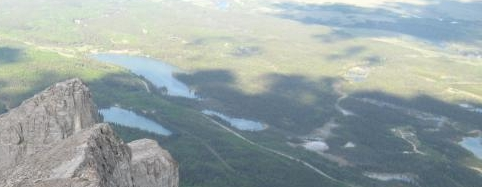
Ghost Lake in Bow Valley

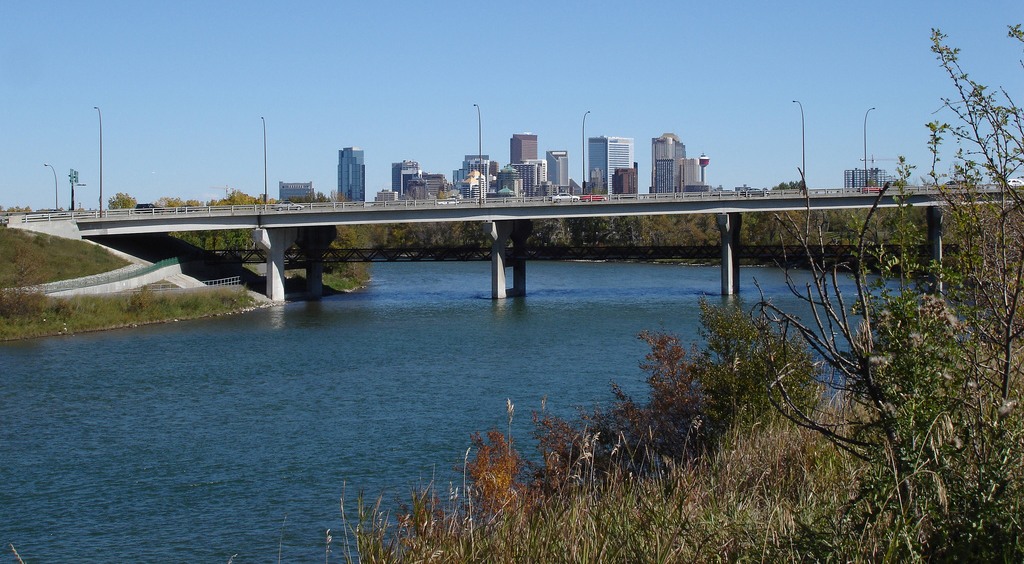
Crowchild Trail crossing the river in Calgary, downtown in background

== See also ==
- List of rivers of Alberta

== Sources ==
- Armstrong, Christopher (2010). The River Returns: An Environmental History of the Bow. Montreal: McGill-Queen's University Press. ISBN 978-0-7735-7679-7.
