= Lac des Arcs (Alberta) =

Lake in Alberta, Canada

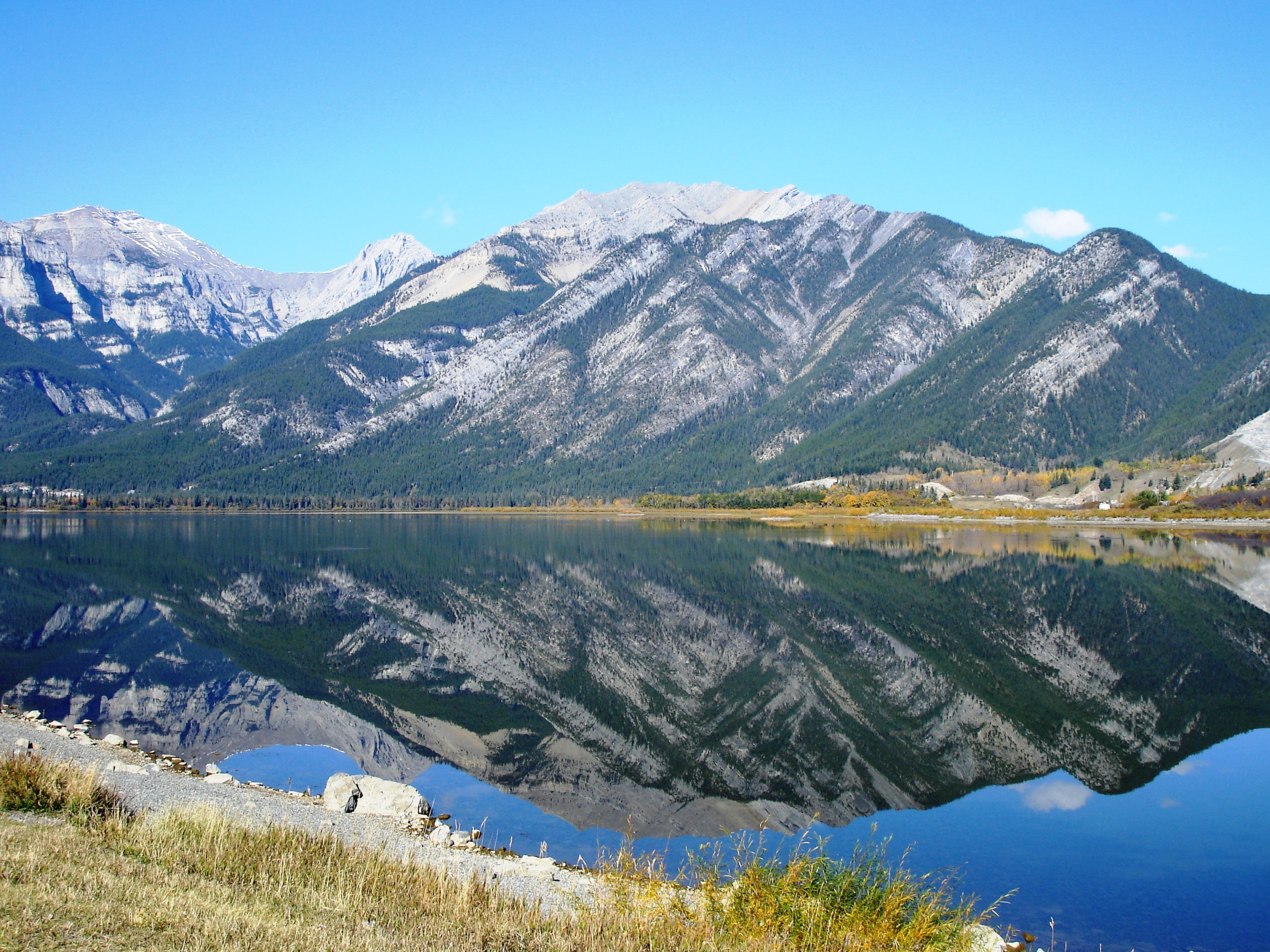
- Lac des Arcs in October
- Interactive map of Lac des Arcs
- Location: Bighorn No. 8, Alberta
- Coordinates: 51°03′15″N 115°10′47″W
- Primary inflows: Bow River
- Primary outflows: Bow River
- Basin countries: Canada
- Surface elevation: 1,320 m (4,330 ft)
- Settlements: Lac des Arcs

Lac des Arcs is a lake in Alberta, Canada, that forms part of the Bow River.

Located within Alberta's Rockies, the Hamlet of Lac des Arcs is on the lake's southeastern shore, while the Lafarge Exshaw Plant and a limestone quarry lie on the lake's northern shore.

The Trans-Canada Highway runs along the southern shore, and the CPKC Railway main line and Highway 1A follow the northern shore. The lake is also locally known for a local landmark, Adams Island (51.053152977037904, -115.18780977137516). This is a small island visible from the Trans-Canada Highway and a common sightseeing attraction for tourisits.
