= Tilted Mountain =

Mountain in Banff NP, Alberta, Canada

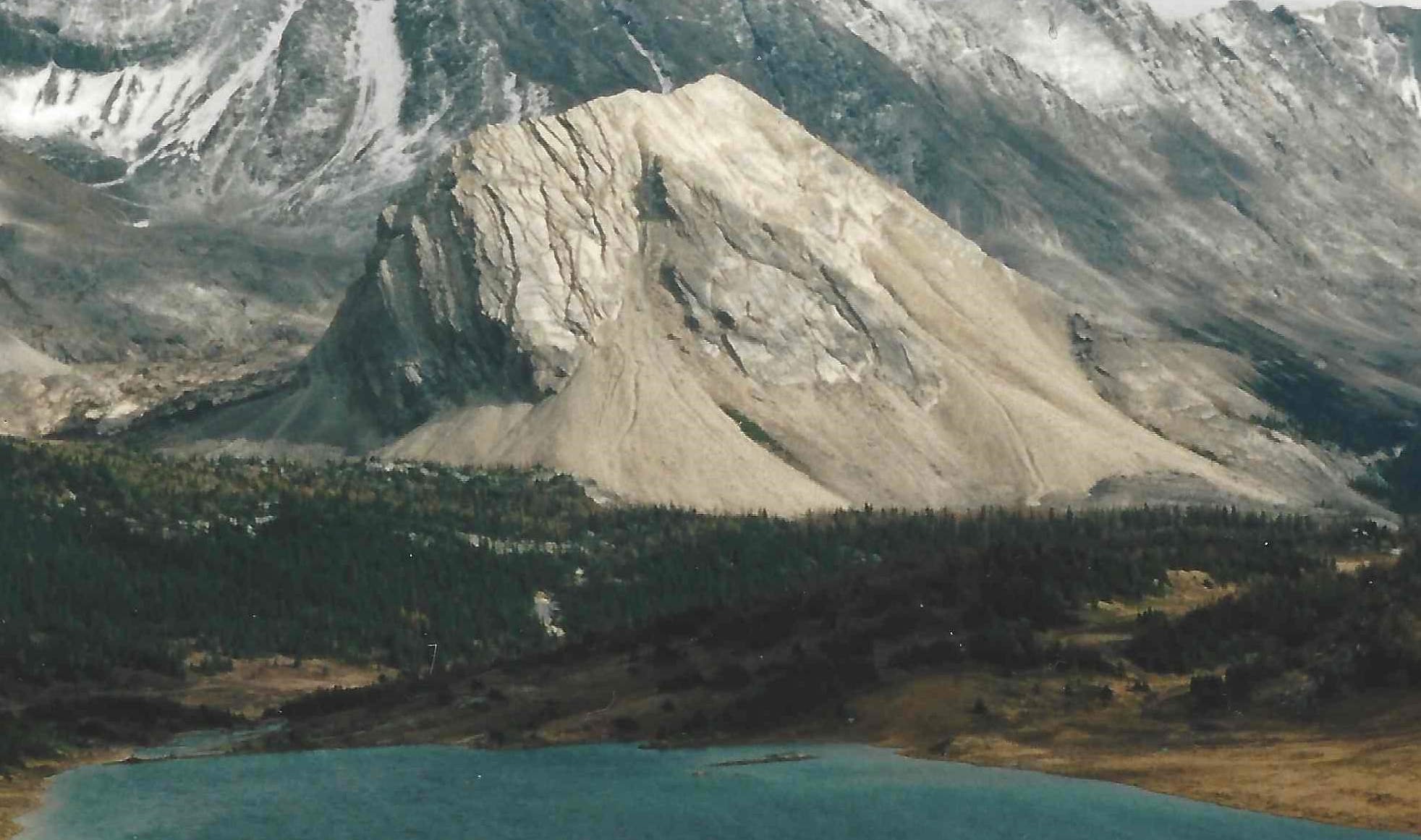
- Tilted Mountain and Baker Lake from Deception Pass area

Highest point
- Elevation: 2,591 m (8,501 ft)
- Prominence: 80 m (260 ft)
- Parent peak: Lychnis Mountain (3124 m)
- Listing: Mountains of Alberta
- Coordinates: 51°29′05″N 115°59′51″W

Geography
- Location within Alberta Location within Canada
- Country: Canada
- Province: Alberta
- Protected area: Banff National Park
- Parent range: Sawback Range; Canadian Rockies
- Topo map: NTS 82O5 Castle Mountain

Geology
- Rock age: Cambrian
- Rock type: Sedimentary rock

Climbing
- Easiest route: Scrambling class 3

Tilted Mountain is a 2,591-metre (8,501-foot) mountain summit located in Banff National Park, in the Canadian Rockies of Alberta, Canada. It is part of the Sawback Range. Its nearest higher peak is Lychnis Mountain, 2.0 km (1.2 mi) to the east in an area of exposed Skoki Formation limestone which is known for fossils such as brachiopods, gastropods, conodonts, cephalopods, trilobites, and echinoderm fragments.

Tilted Mountain was named in 1911 by James F. Porter for the tilted layers of rock strata. The mountain's name was officially adopted in 1924 when approved by the Geographical Names Board of Canada.

== Geology ==
Like other mountains in Banff Park, Tilted Mountain is composed of sedimentary rock laid down during the Precambrian to Jurassic periods. Formed in shallow seas, this sedimentary rock was pushed east and over the top of younger rock during the Laramide orogeny.

== Climate ==
Based on the Köppen climate classification, Tilted Mountain is located in a subarctic climate zone with cold, snowy winters, and mild summers. Temperatures can drop below −20 °C with wind chill factors below −30 °C.

== Gallery ==
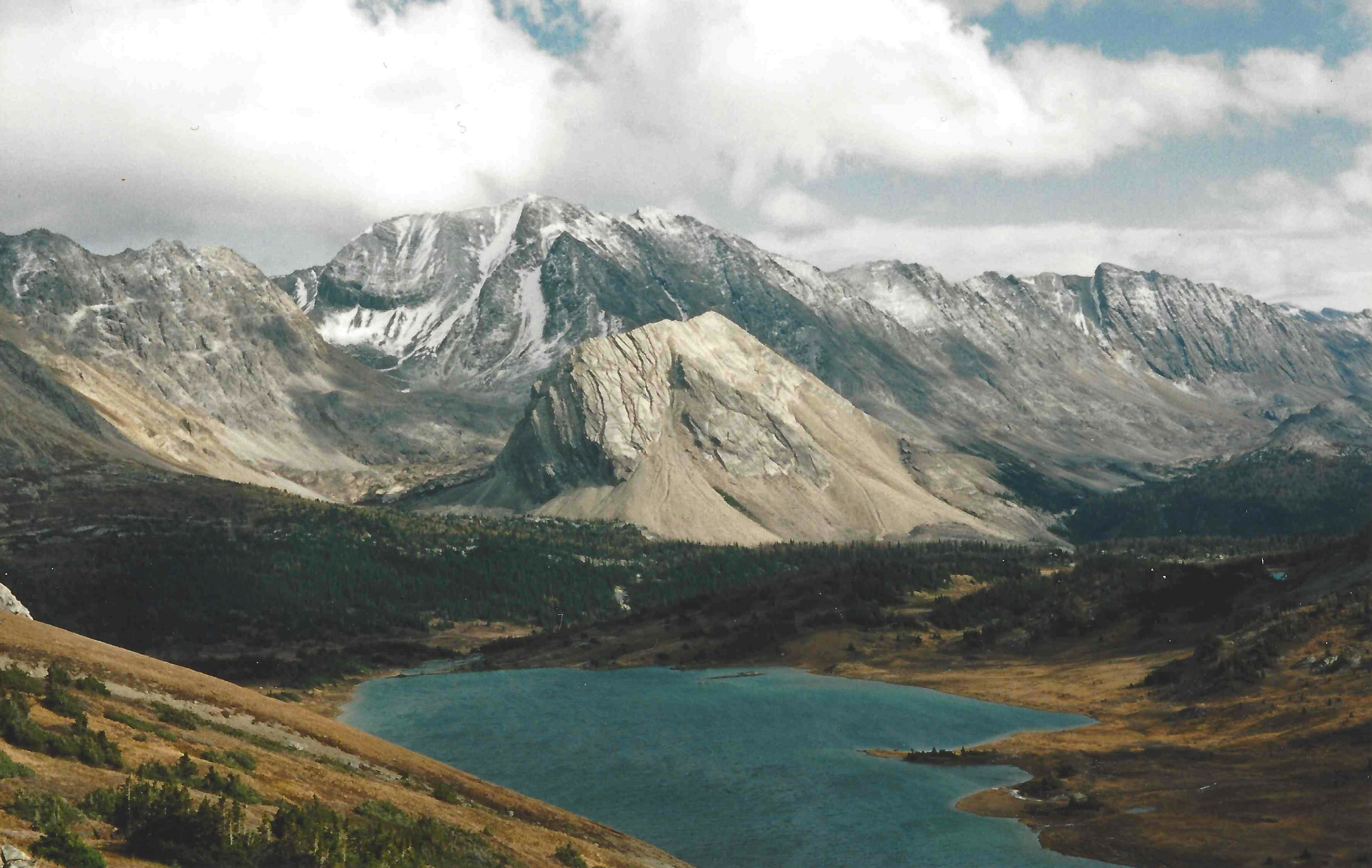
Tilted Mountain centered beyond Baker Lake with Lychnis Mountain in the distance behind all

== See also ==
- Geography of Alberta
- Geology of Alberta
