= Lychnis Mountain =

Mountain in Banff NP, Alberta, Canada

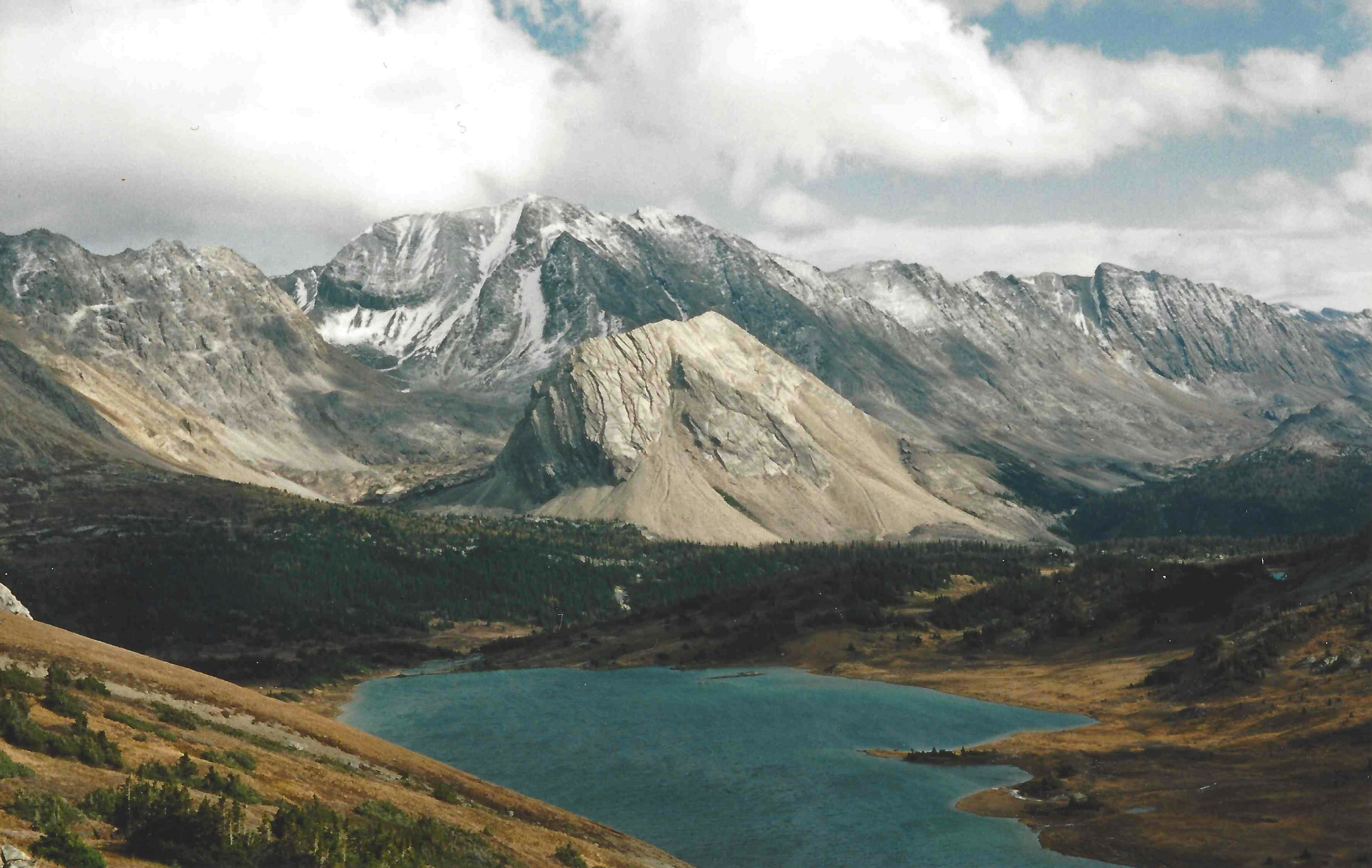
- Lychnis Mountain centered in the distance behind Tilted Mountain and Baker Lake

Highest point
- Elevation: 3,124 m (10,249 ft)
- Prominence: 244 m (801 ft)
- Parent peak: Mount St. Bride (3394 m)
- Listing: Mountains of Alberta
- Coordinates: 51°28′55″N 115°58′10″W

Geography
- Location within Alberta Location within Canada
- Interactive map of Lychnis Mountain
- Location: Alberta, Canada
- Parent range: Sawback Range; Canadian Rockies
- Topo map: NTS 82O5 Castle Mountain

Geology
- Rock age: Cambrian
- Rock type: Sedimentary rock

Climbing
- First ascent: 1969 A.J. Kauffmann, W.L. Putnam, L. Putnam, L.R. Wallace

Lychnis Mountain is a 3,124-metre (10,249-foot) mountain summit located in Banff National Park, in the Canadian Rockies of Alberta, Canada. It is part of the Sawback Range. Its nearest higher peak is Mount St. Bride, 3.1 km (1.9 mi) to the north. The mountain is situated 2.0 km (1.2 mi) east of Tilted Mountain in an area of exposed Skoki Formation limestone which is known for fossils such as brachiopods, gastropods, conodonts, cephalopods, trilobites, and echinoderm fragments.

== History ==
Lychnis Mountain was named in 1911 by James F. Porter for the alpine flower Lychnis.

The mountain's name was officially adopted in 1956 when approved by the Geographical Names Board of Canada.

The first ascent of the mountain was made in 1969 by A.J. Kauffmann, W.L. Putnam, L. Putnam, and L.R. Wallace.

== Geology ==
Like other mountains in Banff Park, Lychnis Mountain is composed of sedimentary rock laid down during the Precambrian to Jurassic periods. Formed in shallow seas, this sedimentary rock was pushed east and over the top of younger rock during the Laramide orogeny.

== Climate ==
Based on the Köppen climate classification, Lychnis Mountain is located in a subarctic climate with cold, snowy winters, and mild summers. Temperatures can drop below −20 °C with wind chill factors below −30 °C.

== Gallery ==
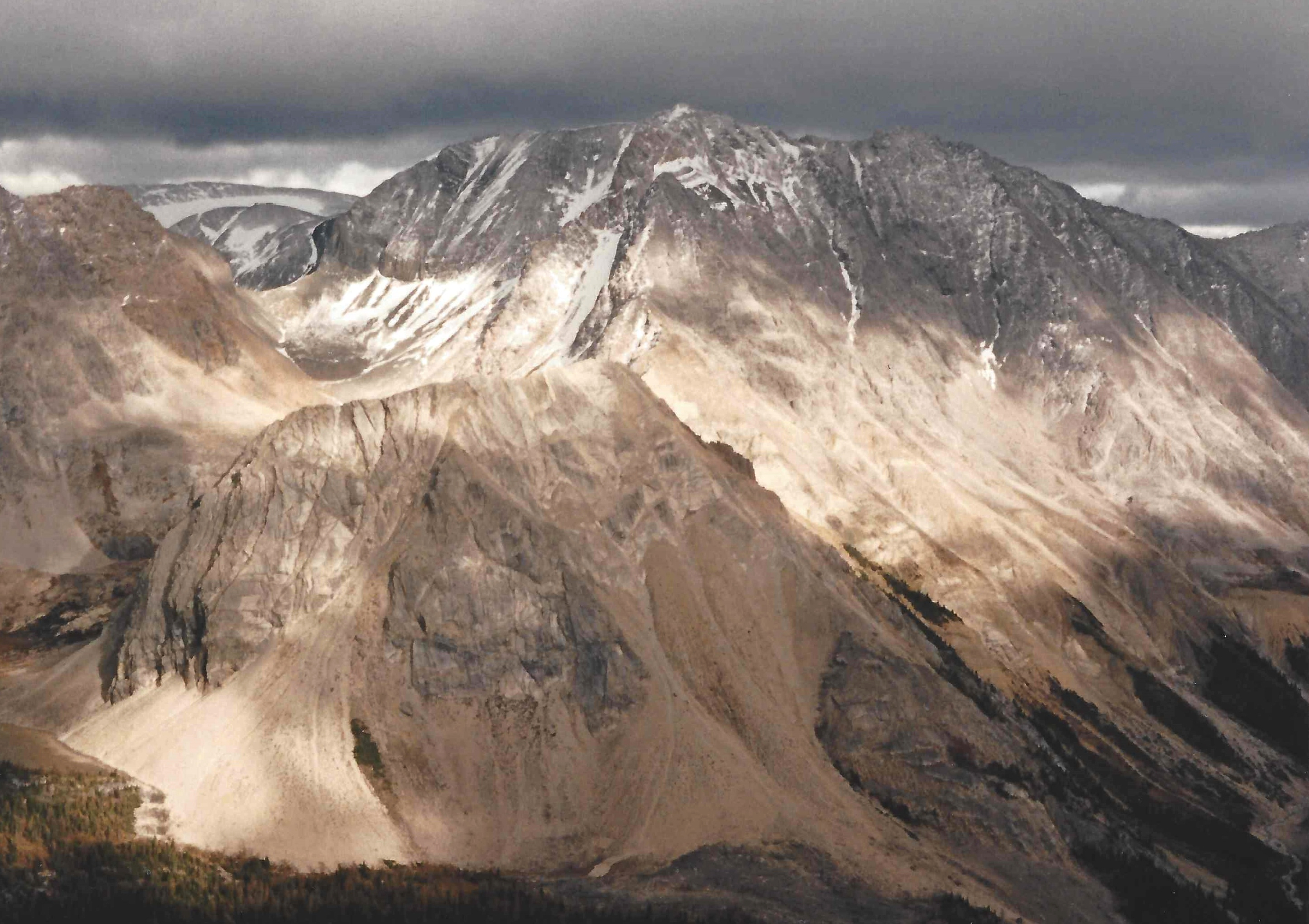
Lychnis Mountain with Tilted Mountain down in front

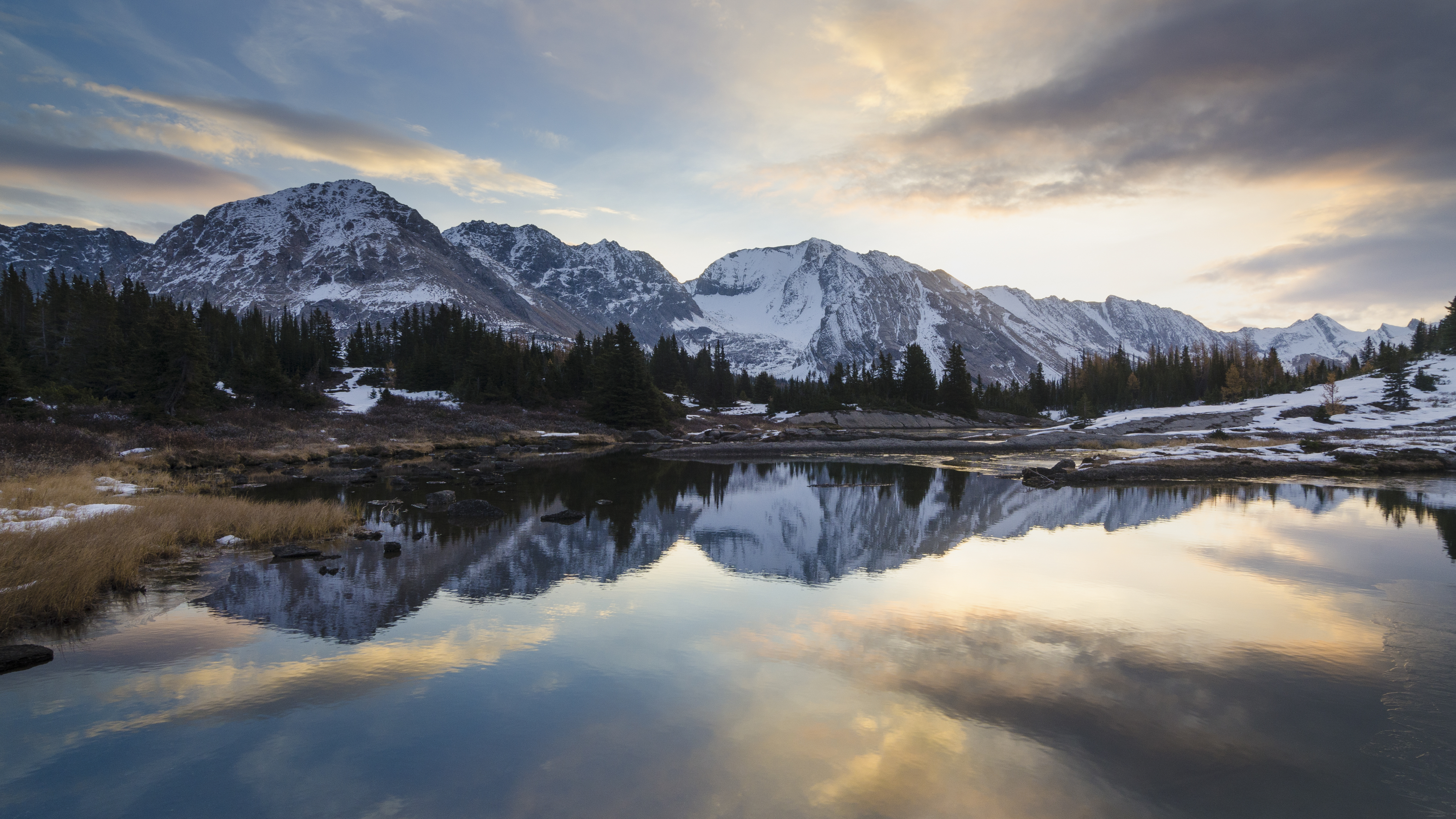
Lychnis Mountain reflected in Baker Lake

== See also ==
- Geography of Alberta
- Geology of Alberta
