= Mount Fraser (Canada) =

Mountain in the country of Canada

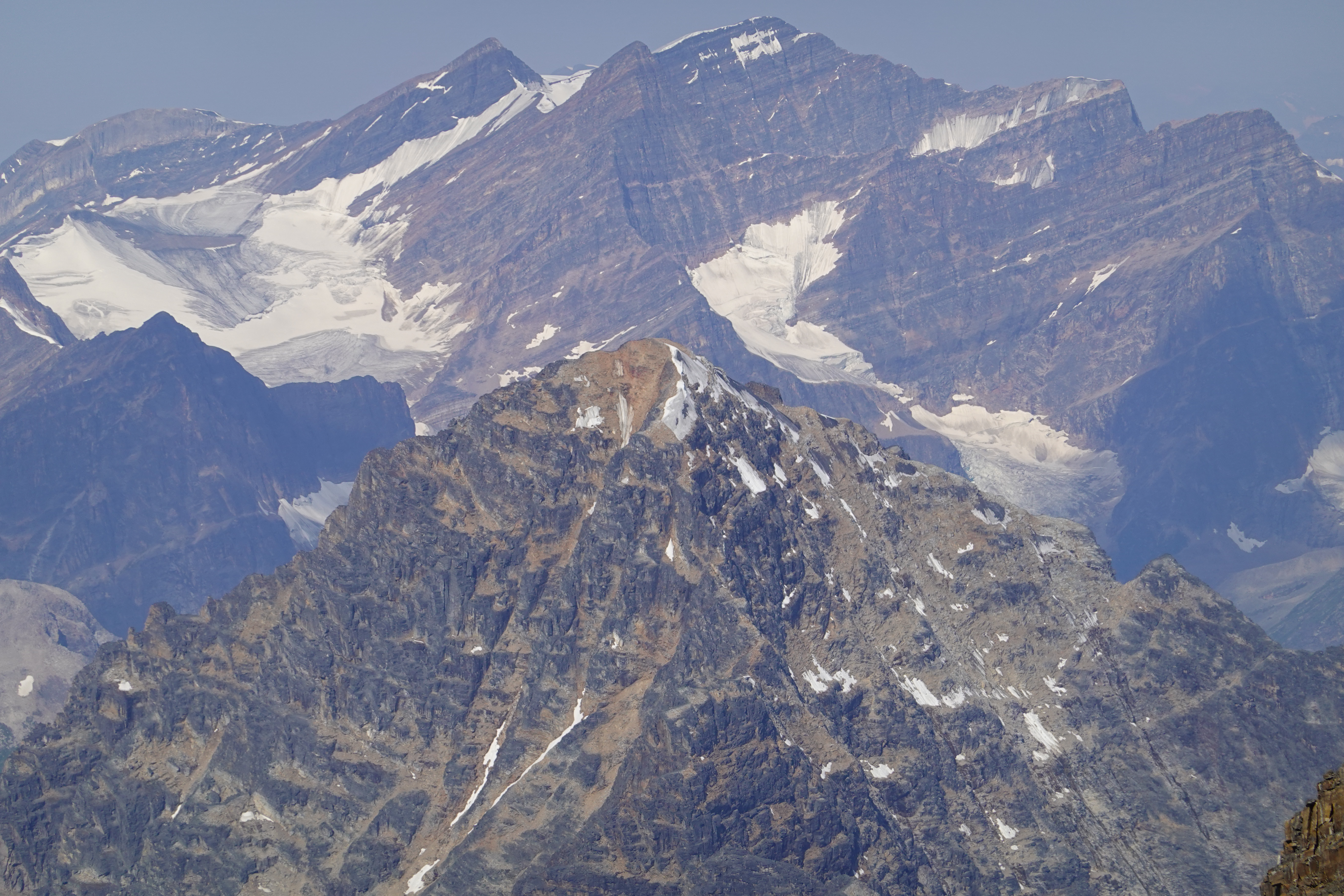
- West aspect of Mount Fraser at top. (View from Mt. Edith Cavell. Throne in foreground)

Highest point
- Elevation: 3,322 m (10,899 ft)
- Prominence: 1,173 m (3,848 ft)
- Parent peak: Mount Edith Cavell (3363 m)
- Listing: Mountains of Alberta; Mountains of British Columbia
- Coordinates: 52°39′23″N 118°19′09″W

Geography
- Location within Alberta Location within British Columbia Location within Canada
- Country: Canada
- Provinces: Alberta and British Columbia
- Protected areas: Jasper National Park; Mount Robson Provincial Park
- Parent range: Park Ranges
- Topo map: NTS 83D9 Amethyst Lakes

Climbing
- First ascent: Sunday, July 13, 1924; A.J. Ostheimer, Strumia, Thorington, Conrad Kain

Mount Fraser is a mountain located on the border of Alberta and British Columbia. It is Alberta's 38th highest peak and Alberta's 22nd most prominent mountain. It is also British Columbia's 50th highest peak. It was named in 1917 after Simon Fraser.

The massif consists of three peaks:

Peak	Elevation	Coordinates
Simon Peak	3,322 m (10,899 ft)	52°39′23″N 118°19′09″W
Bennington Peak	3,265 m (10,712 ft)	52°39′17″N 118°17′53″W
McDonnell Peak	3,261 m (10,699 ft)	52°39′05″N 118°18′22″W

== See also ==
- List of peaks on the Alberta–British Columbia border
- List of mountains in the Canadian Rockies
