= South Jasper Ranges =

Mountain ranges in Alberta and British Columbia

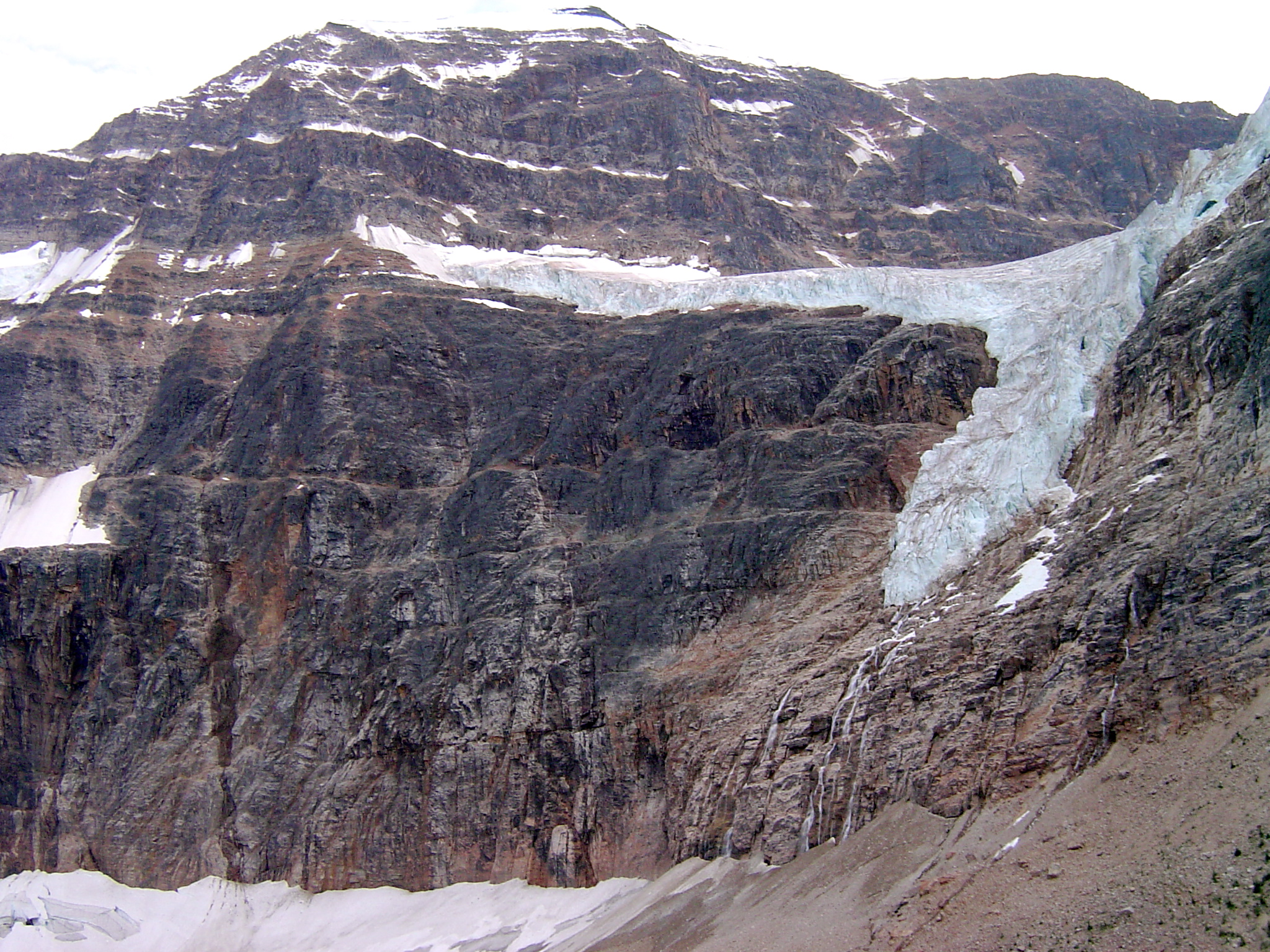
- Mount Edith Cavell and Angel Glacier

Highest point
- Peak: Mount Edith Cavell
- Elevation: 3,363 m (11,033 ft)
- Listing: Mountains of Alberta
- Coordinates: 52°40′02″N 118°03′24″W

Geography
- Location within Canada
- Country: Canada
- Provinces: Alberta and British Columbia
- Range coordinates: 52°43′N 118°16′W
- Parent range: Canadian Rockies
- Topo map: NTS 83D9 Amethyst Lakes

The South Jasper Ranges are mountain ranges of the Rocky Mountains in Alberta and British Columbia, Canada.

It is a part of the Central Main Ranges of the Canadian Rockies, located on the Continental Divide, in Jasper National Park (Alberta) and Mount Robson Provincial Park (British Columbia). It contains the Meadow-Clairvaux, Fraser-Rampart, Trident Range and, most prominently, the Cavell Group of mountains and the headwaters of the Athabasca and Fraser River.

The South Jasper Ranges covers a surface of 1,196 km^{2} (462 mi^{2}), has a length of 39 km (from north to south) and a width of 49 km.

== Peaks and mountains ==
Mountain/Peak	Elevation		Coordinates
Mountain/Peak	m	ft	Coordinates
Mount Edith Cavell	3,363	11,033	52°40'2"N, 118°3'24"W
Simon Peak	3,322	10,899	52°39'24"N, 118°19'6"W
Throne Mountain	3,120	10,240	52°39'47"N, 118°8'21"W
Majestic Mountain	3,086	10,125	52°45'27"N, 118°12'56"W
Mount Estella	3,069	10,069	52°46'1"N, 118°12'41"W
Manx Peak	3,044	9,987	52°46'39"N, 118°11'30"W
Blackhorn Peak	3,000	9,800	52°39'3"N, 118°9'4"W
Roche Noire	2,920	9,580	52°48'53"N, 118°19'3"W
Chevron Mountain	2,835	9,301	52°38'18"N, 118°6'50"W
Terminal Mountain	2,835	9,301	52°46'42"N, 118°9'37"W
Lectern Peak	2,772	9,094	52°44'42"N, 118°6'42"W
Peveril Peak	2,686	8,812	52°45'24"N, 118°9'1"W
Muhigan Mountain	2,626	8,615	52°49'35"N, 118°13'30"W
Marmot Mountain	2,608	8,556	52°47'24"N, 118°7'36"W
The Whistlers	2,470	8,100	52°49'37"N, 118°7'58"W
Tonquin Hill	2,398	7,867	52°44'16"N, 118°19'40"W
