= Chevron Mountain =

Mountain in Alberta, Canada

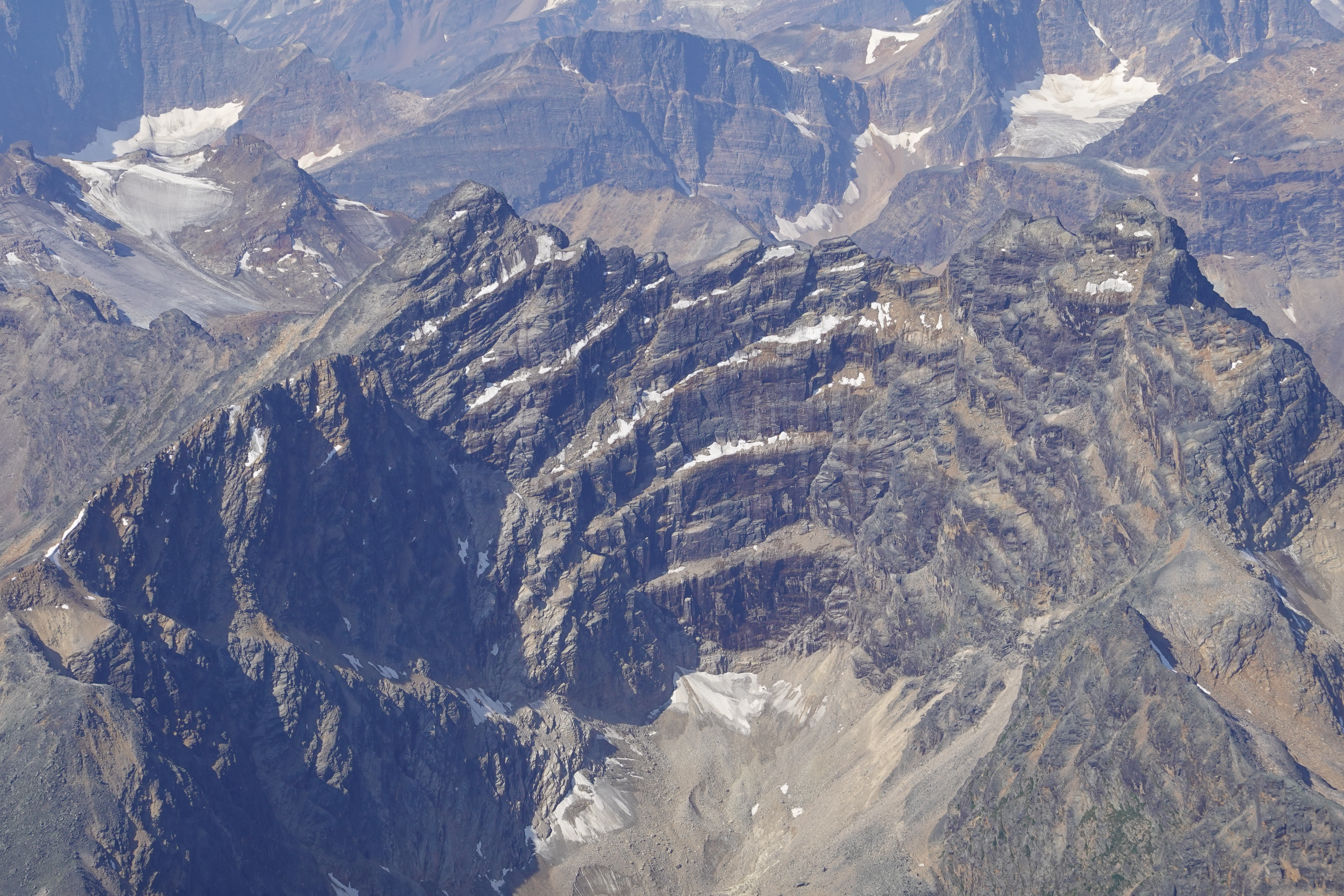
- Northeast aspect

Highest point
- Elevation: 2,835 m (9,301 ft)
- Prominence: 555 m (1,821 ft)
- Parent peak: Blackhorn Peak (3000 m)
- Listing: Mountains of Alberta
- Coordinates: 52°38′18″N 118°06′50″W

Geography
- Location within Alberta
- Country: Canada
- Province: Alberta
- Parent range: South Jasper Ranges
- Topo map: NTS 83D9 Amethyst Lakes

Chevron Mountain is a summit in Alberta, Canada.

Chevron Mountain was named for the fact it resembles a chevron.
