= Tonquin Hill =

Hill on the Alberta-British Columbia border in Canada

- Location within Alberta Location within British Columbia Location within Canada

Highest point
- Elevation: 2,396 m (7,861 ft)
- Prominence: 316 m (1,037 ft)
- Listing: Mountains of Alberta; Mountains of British Columbia
- Coordinates: 52°44′16″N 118°19′40″W

Geography
- Country: Canada
- Provinces: Alberta and British Columbia
- District: Cariboo Land District
- Parent range: South Jasper Ranges
- Topo map: NTS 83D9 Amethyst Lakes

Tonquin Hill is located on the northern side of Tonquin Pass, north of Mount Fraser, on the Continental Divide marking the Alberta-British Columbia border. It was named in 1916 by E. Deville.

== See also ==
- List of peaks on the Alberta–British Columbia border
