= Blackhorn Peak =

Mountain in Alberta, Canada

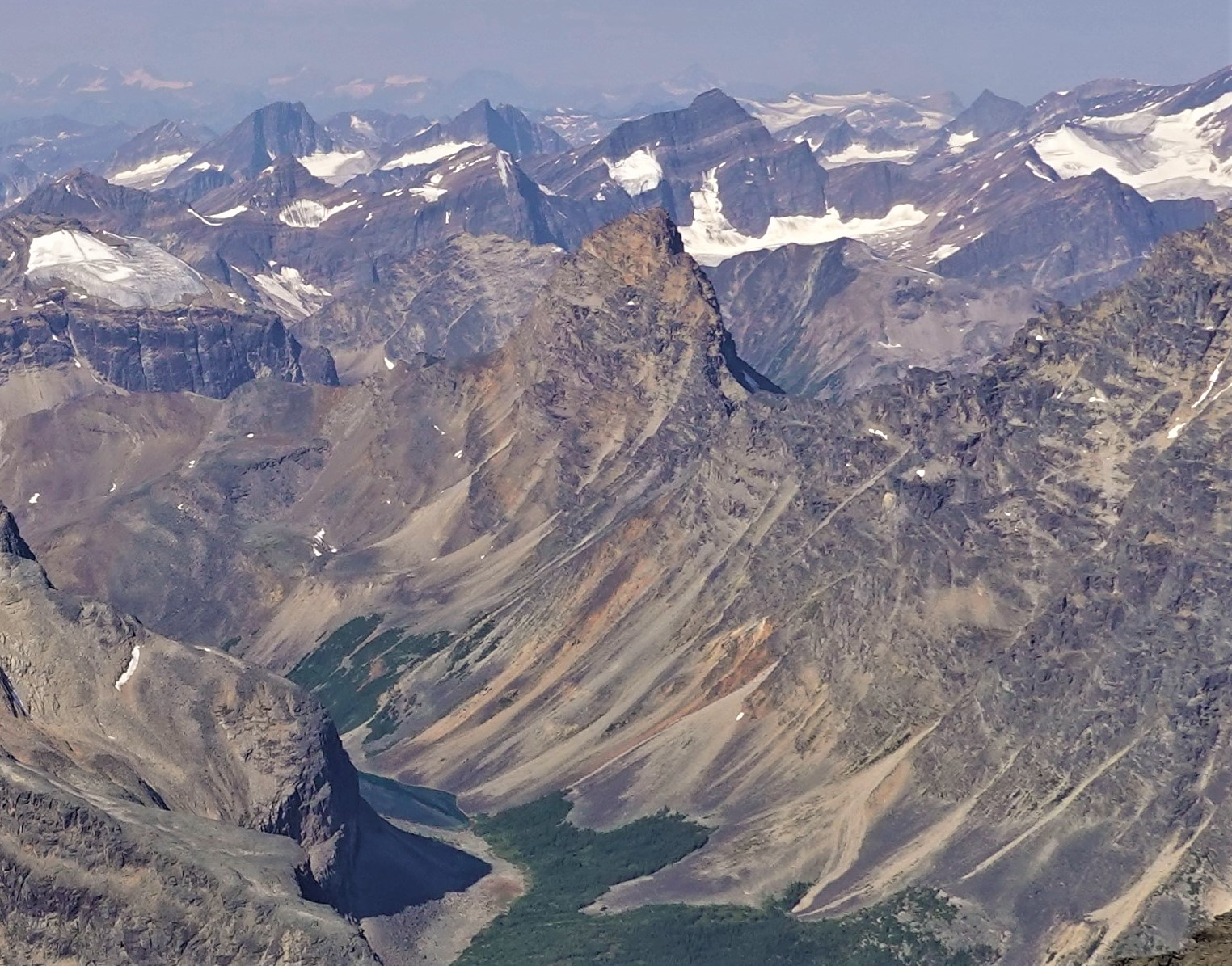
- East aspect, centered

Highest point
- Elevation: 3,000 m (9,800 ft)
- Prominence: 360 m (1,180 ft)
- Parent peak: Throne Mountain (3,120 m)
- Isolation: 1.49 km (0.93 mi)
- Listing: Mountains of Alberta
- Coordinates: 52°39′03″N 118°09′04″W

Geography
- Location within Alberta Location within Canada
- Country: Canada
- Province: Alberta
- Protected area: Jasper National Park
- Parent range: South Jasper Ranges
- Topo map: NTS 83D9 Amethyst Lakes

Geology
- Rock age: Cambrian
- Rock type: Sedimentary rock

Climbing
- First ascent: 1926, Bradley B. Gilman

Blackhorn Peak is a 3,000-metre (9,800-foot) summit in Alberta, Canada.

== Description ==
Blackhorn Peak is located within Jasper National Park in the Canadian Rockies. The town of Jasper is situated 27 kilometres (17 mi) to the north and the Continental Divide is 11 kilometres (6.8 mi) to the west. The nearest higher neighbor is Throne Mountain, 1.57 km (0.98 mi) to the northeast. Precipitation runoff from Blackhorn drains north into the Astoria River via Campus and Verdant creeks. Topographic relief is significant as the summit rises 1,290 m (4,230 ft) above the river in 2.5 km (1.6 mi).

== History ==
The landform's descriptive name was applied in 1916 by Morrison P. Bridgland (1878–1948), a Dominion Land Surveyor who named many peaks in Jasper Park and the Canadian Rockies. The first ascent of the summit was made in 1926 by Bradley Baldwin Gilman, R. Cleveland, and B.G. Jefferson. The mountain's toponym was officially adopted in 1935 by the Geographical Names Board of Canada.

== Geology ==
The mountain is composed of sedimentary rock laid down during the Precambrian to Jurassic periods and pushed east and over the top of younger rock during the Laramide orogeny.

== Climate ==
Based on the Köppen climate classification, Blackhorn is located in a subarctic climate zone with cold, snowy winters, and mild summers. Winter temperatures can drop below −20 °C (−4 °F) with wind chill factors below −30 °C (−22 °F).

== See also ==
- Geography of Alberta
