= Franchère Peak =

Mountain in Alberta, Canada

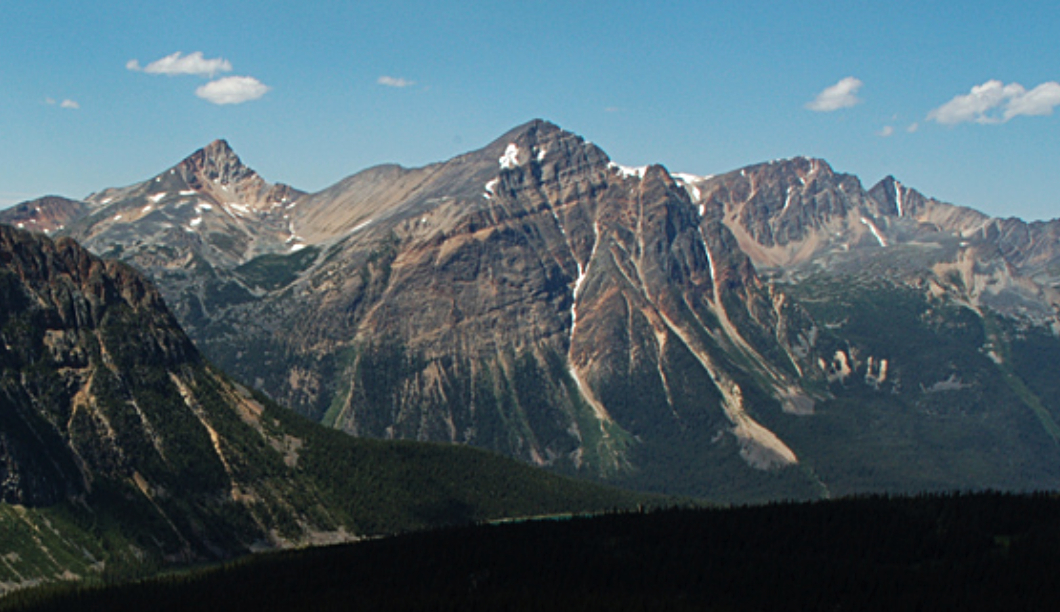
- Franchère Peak (centered) seen from Cavell Meadows

Highest point
- Elevation: 2,805 m (9,203 ft)
- Prominence: 345 m (1,132 ft)
- Parent peak: Aquila Mountain 2840 m
- Listing: Mountains of Alberta
- Coordinates: 52°43′01″N 118°06′00″W

Geography
- Location within Alberta Location within Canada
- Interactive map of Franchère Peak
- Location: Alberta, Canada
- Parent range: Canadian Rockies
- Topo map: NTS 83D9 Amethyst Lakes

Franchère Peak is a 2,805-metre (9,203-foot) mountain summit located in the Astoria River valley of Jasper National Park, in the Canadian Rockies of Alberta, Canada. The mountain was named in 1917 for Gabriel Franchère (1786–1863), a French Canadian author and explorer of the Pacific Northwest who wrote the first account of an 1814 journey over Athabasca Pass. Franchère was a member of John Jacob Astor's Pacific Fur Company and sailed to Fort Astoria on the Tonquin, after which the nearby Tonquin Valley was named. The mountain's name was officially adopted on March 5, 1935 when approved by the Geographical Names Board of Canada. Its nearest higher peak is Aquila Mountain, 2.00 km (1.24 mi) to the north. Mount Edith Cavell is situated immediately south-southeast across the Astoria River valley.

== Climate ==
Based on the Köppen climate classification, Franchère Peak is located in a subarctic climate zone with cold, snowy winters, and mild summers. Winter temperatures can drop below -20 °C with wind chill factors below -30 °C. Precipitation runoff from Franchère Peak drains into Portal Creek and Astoria River which are both tributaries of the Athabasca River.

== Geology ==
The mountain is composed of sedimentary rock laid down during the Precambrian to Jurassic periods and pushed east and over the top of younger rock during the Laramide orogeny.

== Gallery ==
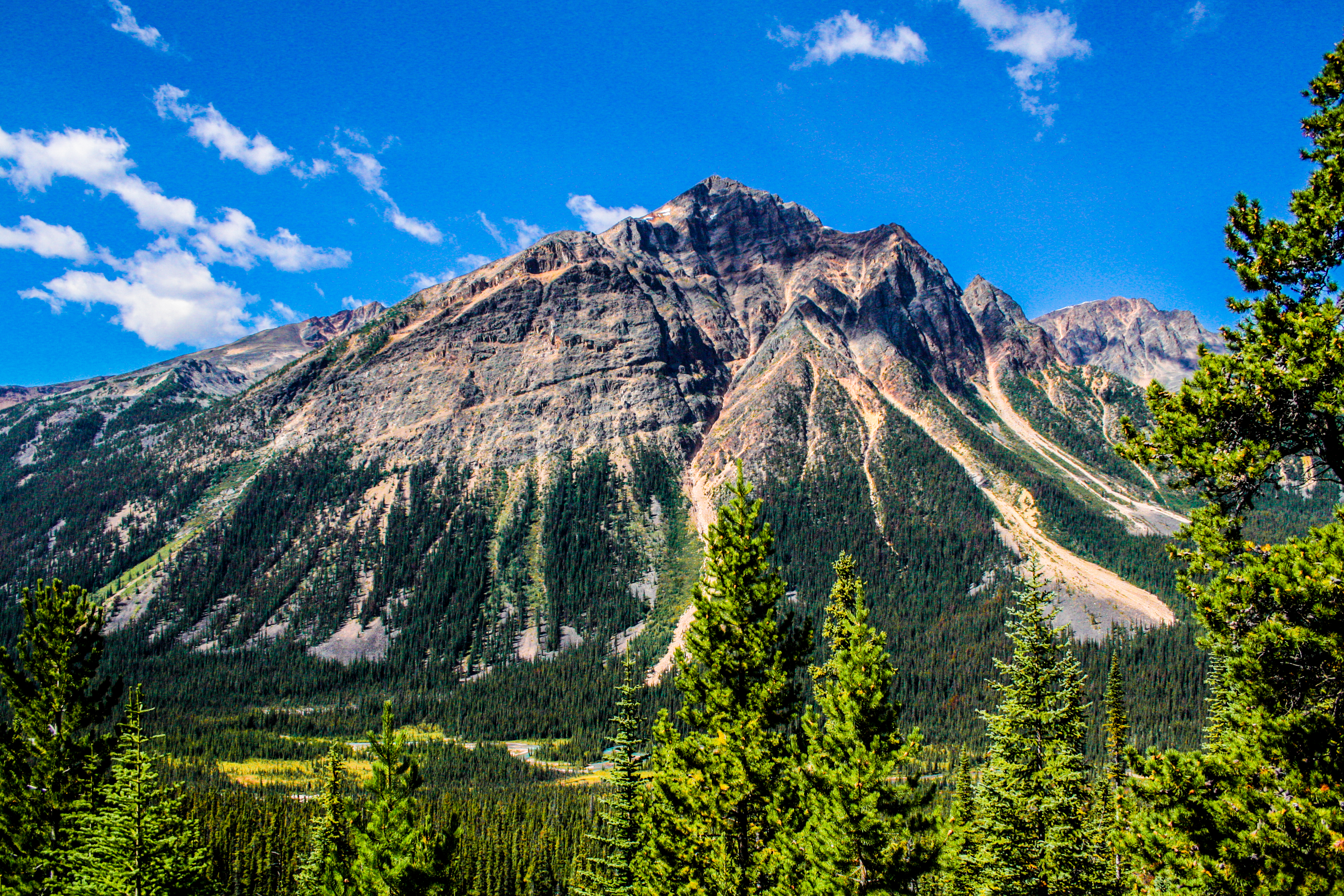
Southeast aspect

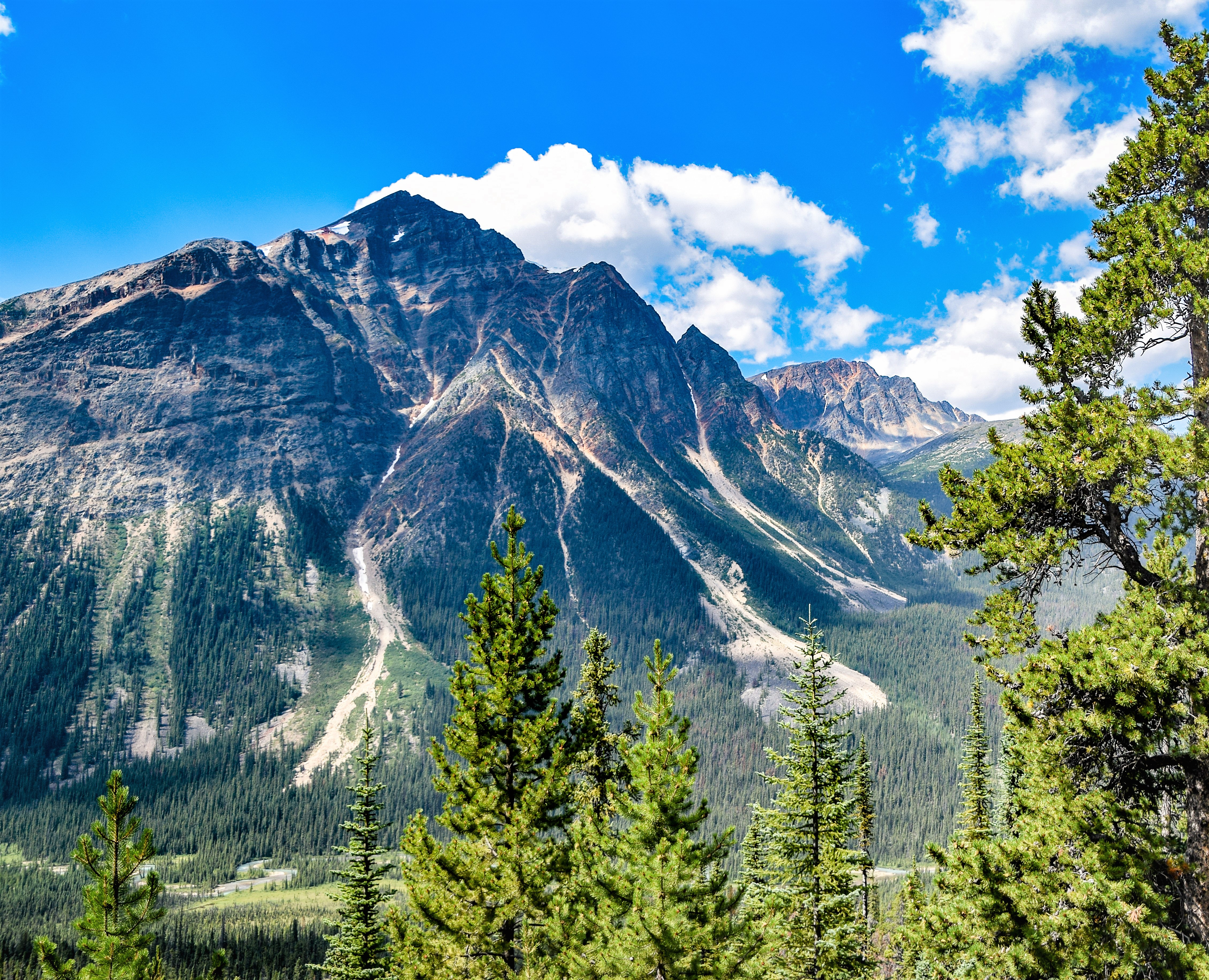
Southeast aspect

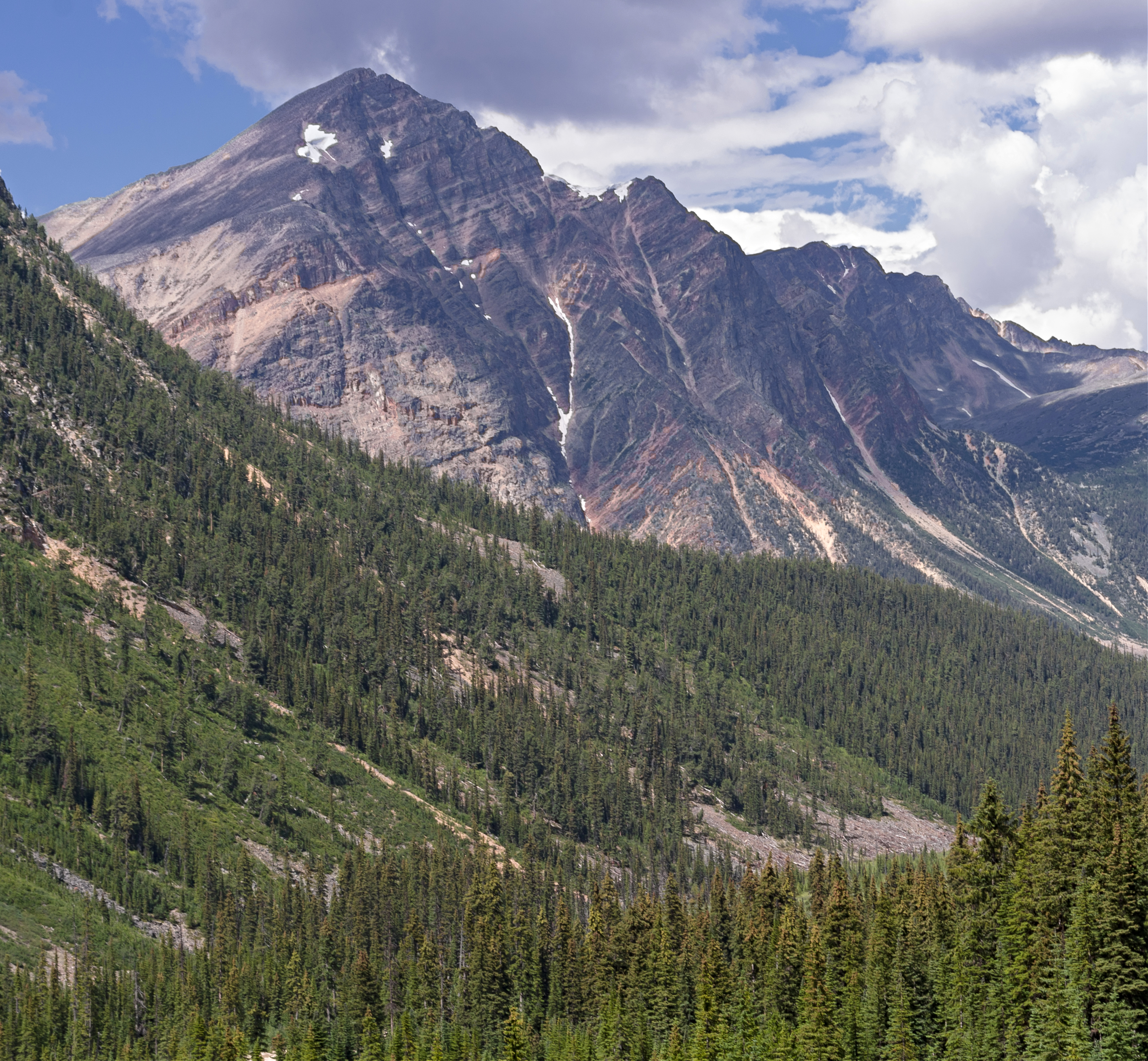
Franchère Peak

== See also ==
- Geography of Alberta
