= Throne Mountain =

Mountain in the country of Canada

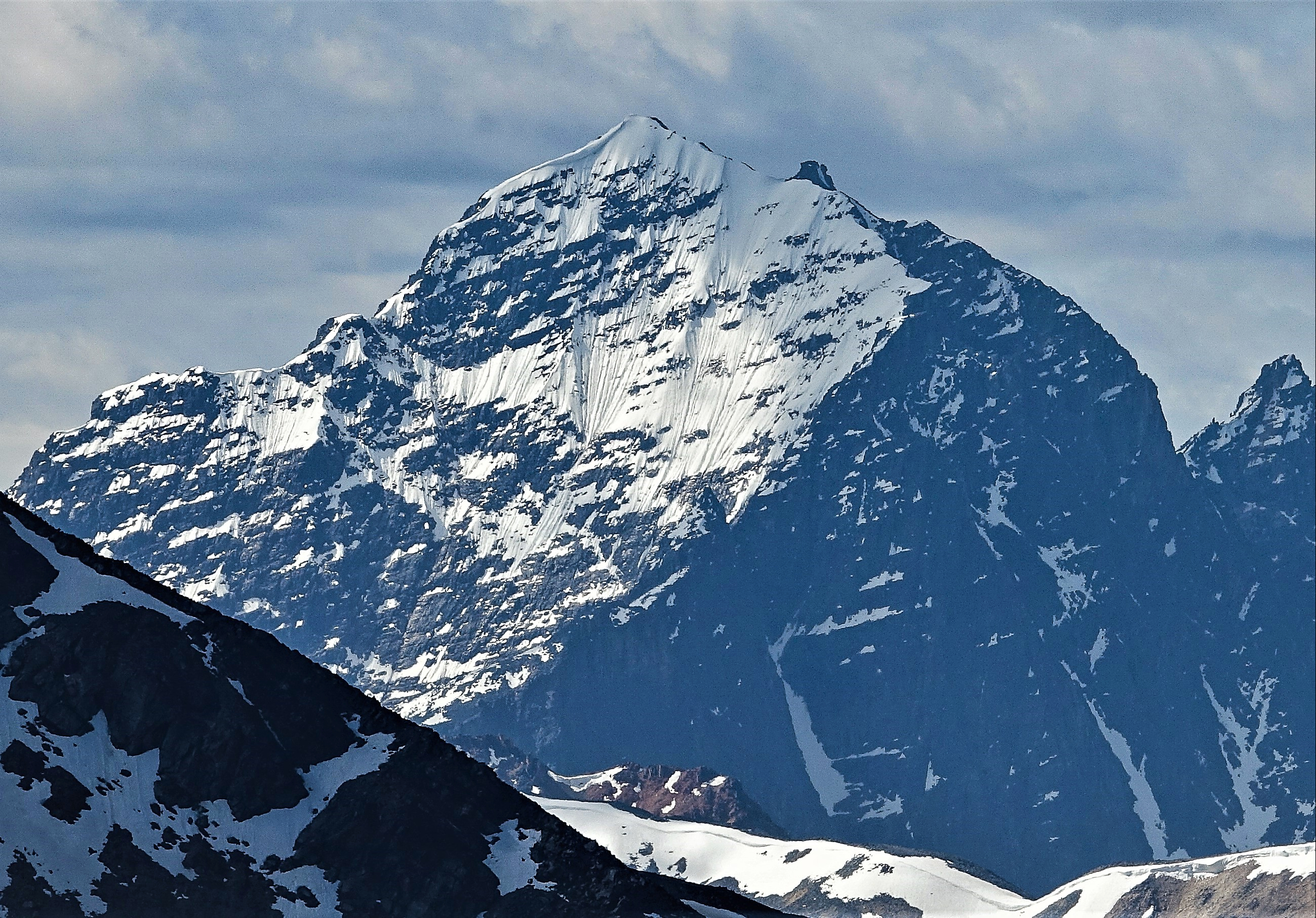
- Throne Mountain, north aspect

Highest point
- Elevation: 3,120 m (10,240 ft)
- Prominence: 880 m (2,890 ft)
- Parent peak: Mount Edith Cavell (3,363 m)
- Isolation: 5.02 km (3.12 mi)
- Listing: Mountains of Alberta
- Coordinates: 52°39′47″N 118°08′21″W

Geography
- Location within Alberta Location within Canada
- Interactive map of Throne Mountain
- Location: Jasper National Park; Alberta, Canada
- Parent range: South Jasper Ranges; Canadian Rockies
- Topo map: NTS 83D9 Amethyst Lakes

Climbing
- First ascent: 1926

Throne Mountain is a prominent 3,120-metre (10,236 ft) mountain summit located in Jasper National Park, in the South Jasper Ranges of the Canadian Rockies of Alberta, Canada. It is situated 24 kilometres (15 mi) south of the town of Jasper, and 8 kilometres (5.0 mi) east of Tonquin Valley. The nearest higher neighbor is Mount Edith Cavell, 5.8 km (3.6 mi) to the east, and Franchère Peak lies 7.0 km (4.3 mi) to the northeast. The peak is composed of sedimentary rock laid down from the Precambrian to the Jurassic periods, that was pushed east and over the top of younger rock during the Laramide orogeny.

== History ==
The peak was named in 1916 by Morrison P. Bridgland because the shape of the mountain resembles a chair. Bridgland (1878–1948), was a Dominion Land Surveyor who named many peaks in Jasper Park and the Canadian Rockies.

The first ascent of Throne Mountain was made in 1926 by J. W. A. Hickson and Howard Palmer, with guide J. Weber.

This mountain's name was officially adopted in 1935 by the Geographical Names Board of Canada.

== Climate ==
Based on the Köppen climate classification, Throne Mountain is located in a subarctic climate zone with cold, snowy winters, and mild summers. Winter temperatures can drop below −20 °C (−4 °F) with wind chill factors below −30 °C (−22 °F). Precipitation runoff from Throne Mountain drains into the Astoria River, thence the Athabasca River.

== Gallery ==
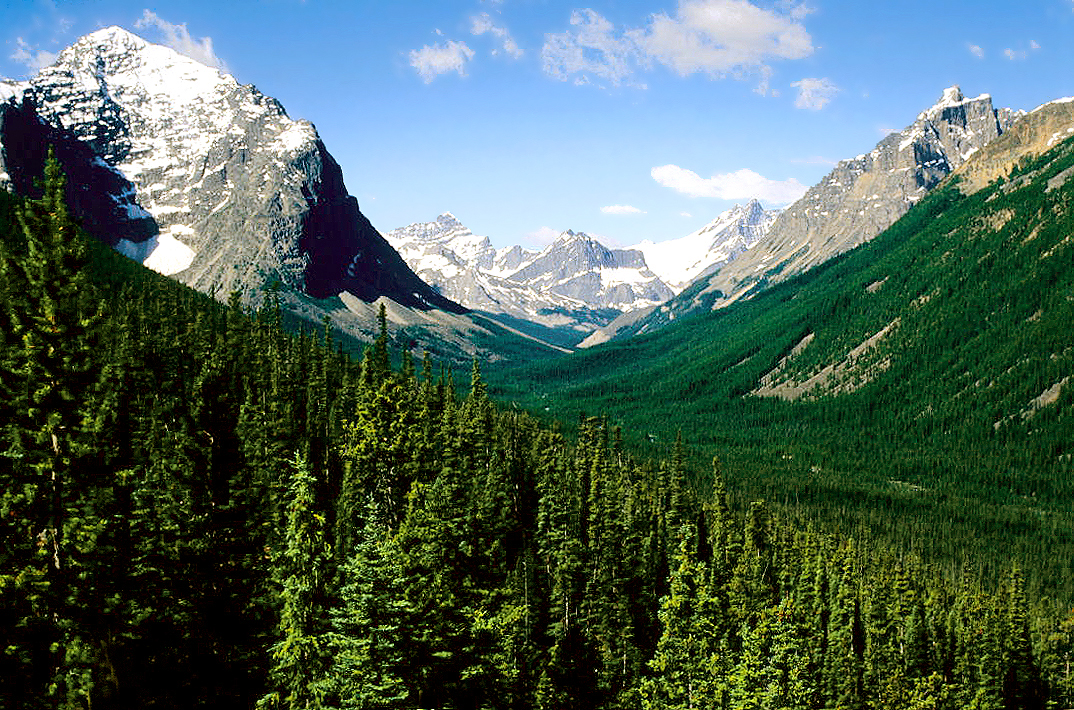
Throne (left), Astoria Valley, Oldhorn (right)

== See also ==
- List of mountains of Canada
- Geography of Alberta
