= Peveril Peak =

Mountain in the country of Canada

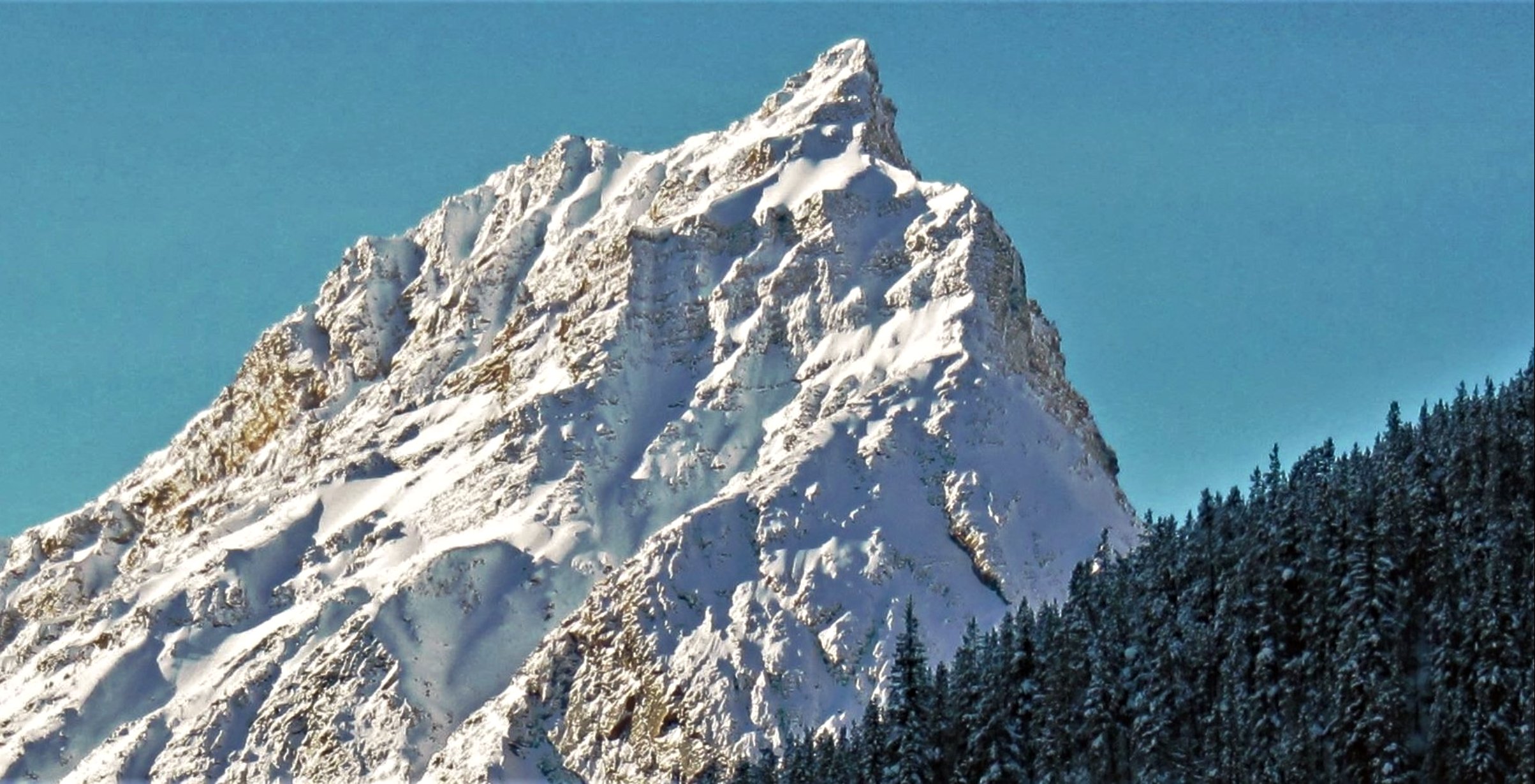
- Northeast aspect

Highest point
- Elevation: 2,686 m (8,812 ft)
- Prominence: 256 m (840 ft)
- Parent peak: Majestic Mountain (3,086 m)
- Isolation: 2.57 km (1.60 mi)
- Listing: Mountains of Alberta
- Coordinates: 52°45′24″N 118°09′01″W

Geography
- Location within Alberta Location within Canada
- Interactive map of Peveril Peak
- Country: Canada
- Province: Alberta
- Protected area: Jasper National Park
- Parent range: Trident Range; Canadian Rockies
- Topo map: NTS 83D16 Jasper

Climbing
- First ascent: 1926
- Easiest route: Scrambling

Peveril Peak is a 2,686-metre (8,812-foot) mountain summit located in Alberta, Canada.

== Description ==
Peveril Peak is set within Jasper National Park, in the Trident Range of the Canadian Rockies. The town of Jasper is situated 14 kilometres (8.7 mi) to the north and the Continental Divide is 13 kilometres (8.1 mi) to the west. The nearest higher neighbor is Terminal Mountain, 2.57 km (1.60 mi) to the north. The peak is visible from the Icefields Parkway to the east. Precipitation runoff from Peveril Peak drains into Portal Creek, a tributary of the Athabasca River. Topographic relief is significant as the summit rises 850 meters (2,790 feet) above the creek in one kilometer (0.6 mile).

== History ==
The summit was first reached in 1926 by Bradley B. Gilman and his crew, who called it "Portal Peak." The peak was named in 1932 after Sir Walter Scott's 1823 novel Peveril of the Peak, and in turn the title refers to Peveril Castle. The mountain's toponym was officially adopted February 7, 1951, by the Geographical Names Board of Canada.

== Climate ==
Based on the Köppen climate classification, Peveril Peak is located in a subarctic climate zone with cold, snowy winters, and mild summers. Winter temperatures can drop below -20 °C with wind chill factors below -30 °C.

== Geology ==
The mountain is composed of sedimentary rock laid down during the Precambrian to Jurassic periods and pushed east and over the top of younger rock during the Laramide orogeny.

== Gallery ==
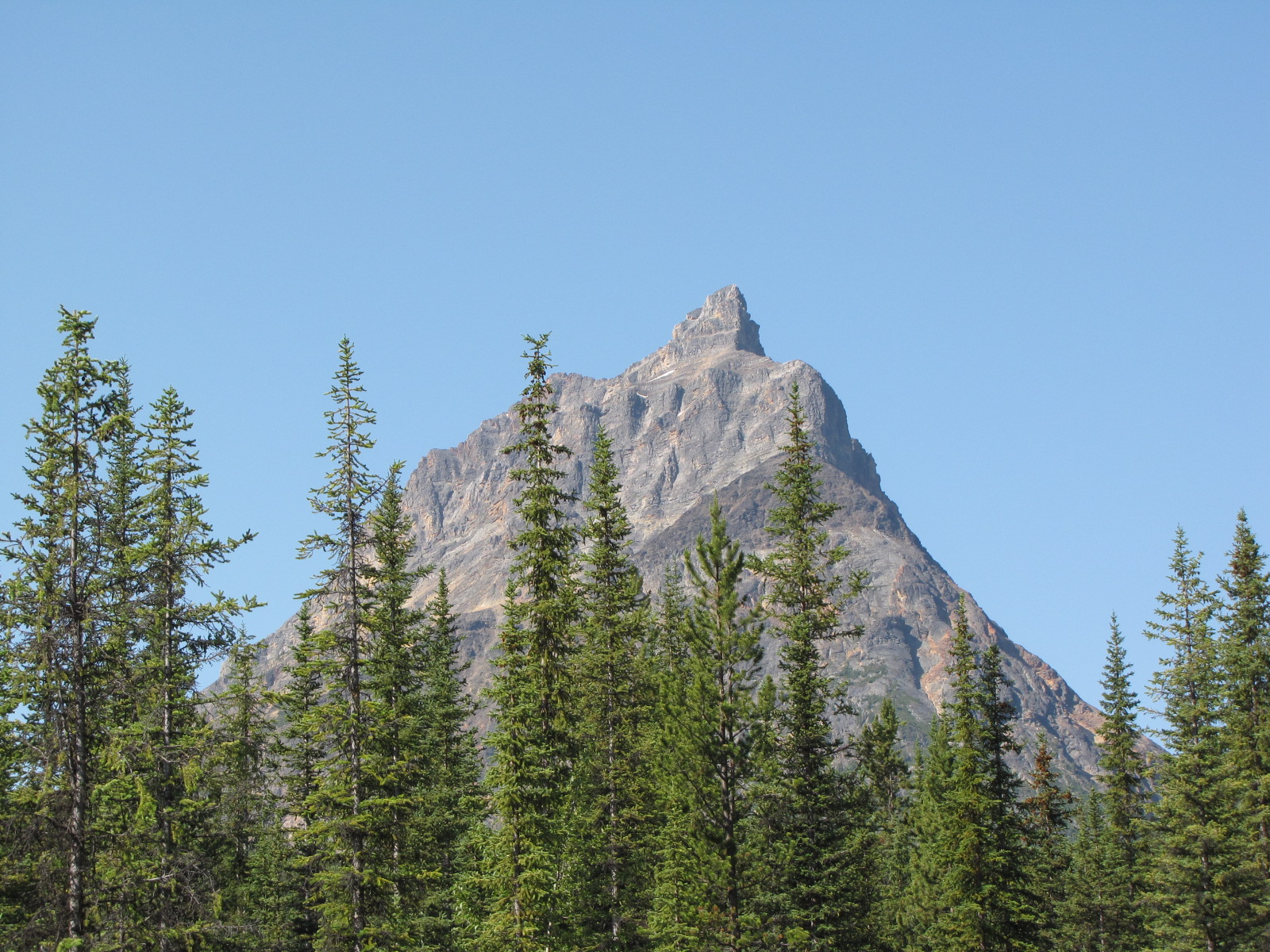

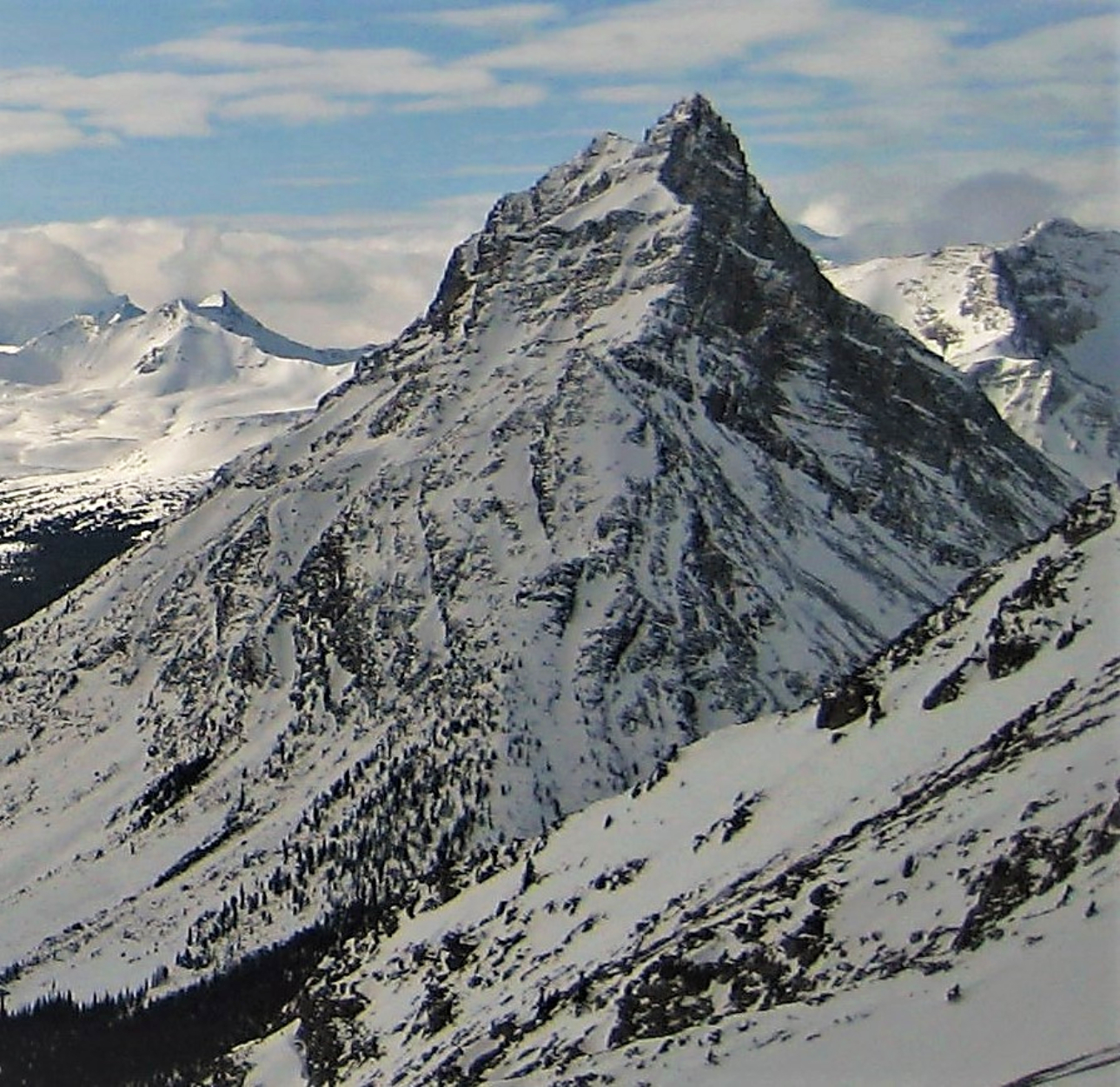

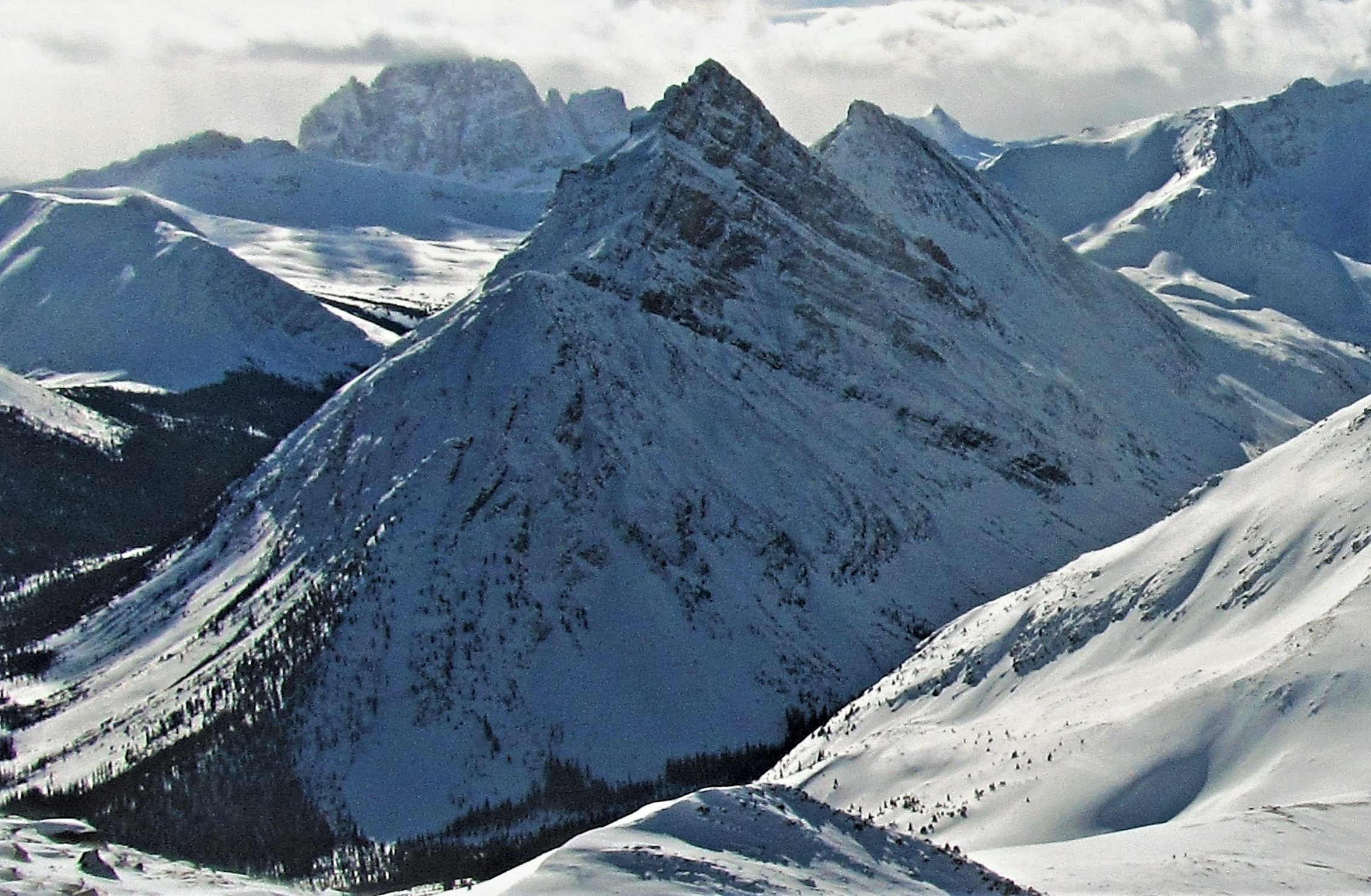

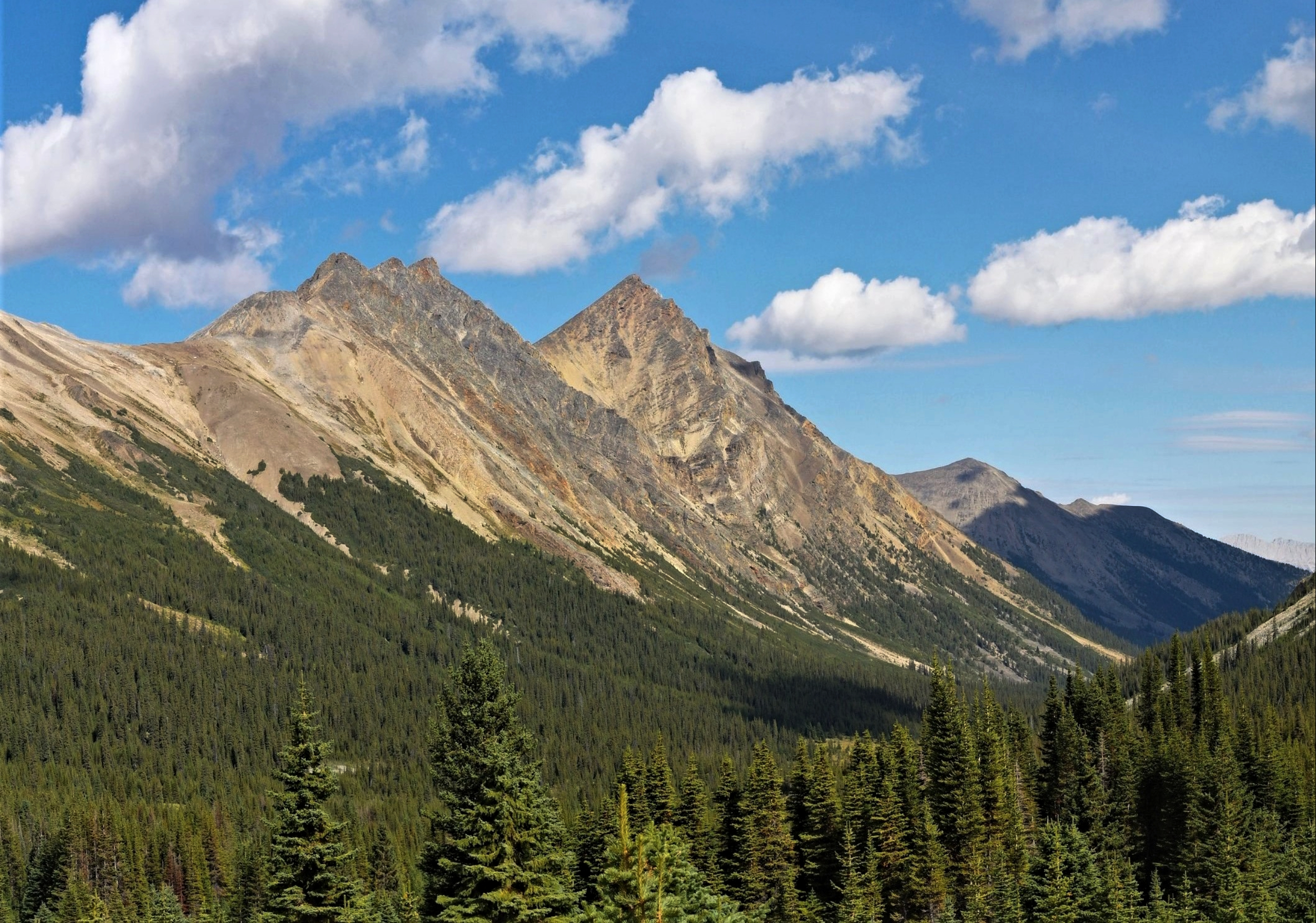
South aspect

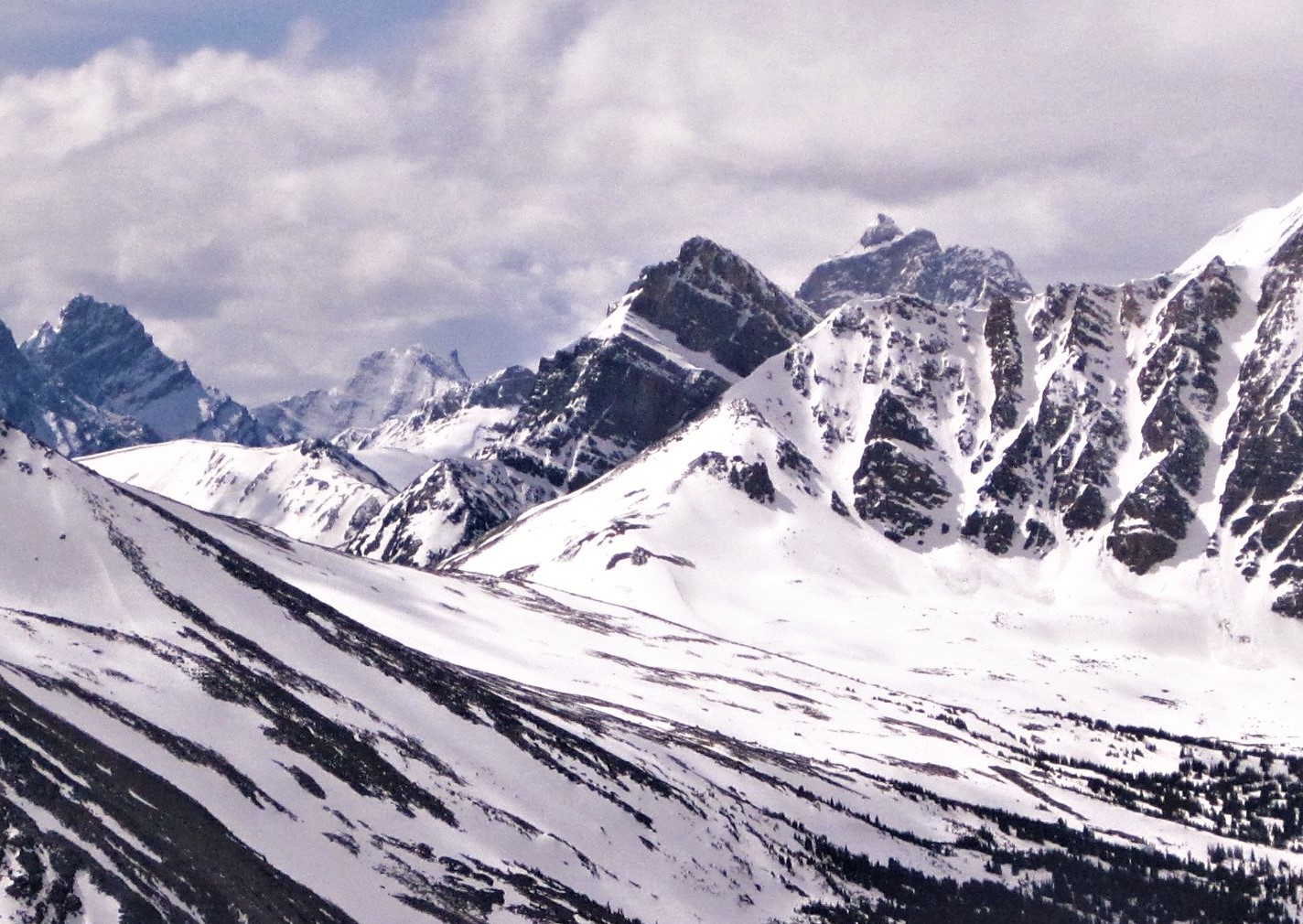
Peveril Peak (centered) with Oldhorn Mountain (behind, right) viewed from The Whistlers.

== See also ==
- Geography of Alberta
