= Oldhorn Mountain =

Mountain in Alberta, Canada

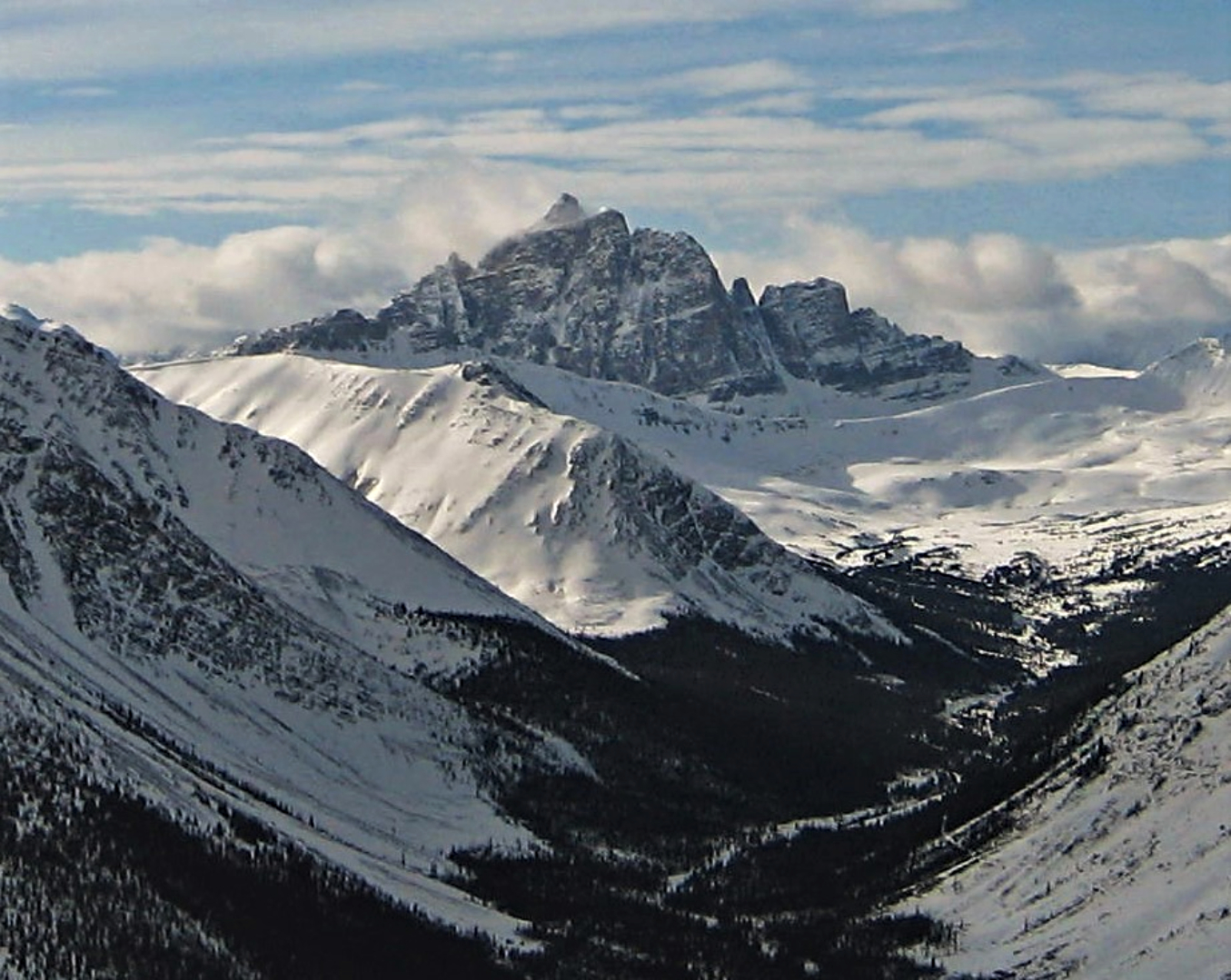
- North aspect

Highest point
- Elevation: 3,000 m (9,843 ft)
- Prominence: 760 m (2,493 ft)
- Parent peak: Majestic Mountain (3,086 m)
- Isolation: 3.95 km (2.45 mi)
- Listing: Mountains of Alberta
- Coordinates: 52°41′23″N 118°10′41″W

Geography
- Location within Alberta Location within Canada
- Country: Canada
- Province: Alberta
- Protected area: Jasper National Park
- Parent range: Trident Range; Canadian Rockies
- Topo map: NTS 83D9 Amethyst Lakes

Geology
- Rock age: Cambrian
- Rock type: Sedimentary rock

Climbing
- First ascent: 1924

Oldhorn Mountain is a 3,000-metre (9,843-foot) summit in Alberta, Canada.

== Description ==
Oldhorn Mountain is located within Jasper National Park, in the Trident Range of the Canadian Rockies. The town of Jasper is situated 20 kilometres (12 mi) to the north-northeast and the Continental Divide is 8 kilometres (5.0 mi) to the west. The nearest higher neighbor is Throne Mountain, 3.95 km (2.45 mi) to the southeast. Precipitation runoff from Oldhorn drains south into the Astoria River and topographic relief is significant as the summit rises 1,320 meters (4,330 feet) above the river in two kilometers (1.2 mile).

== History ==
The landform was named in 1916 by William Pittman Hinton (1871–1955), who attributed the shape of the mountain to that of a horn. The Oldhorn name appeared in print in the 1921 guidebook, "A Climber's Guide to the Rocky Mountains of Canada". The first ascent of the summit was made in 1924 by Lawrence Coolidge (the son of Harold Jefferson Coolidge Sr.), George Higginson, and Joe Johnson, with guide Alfred Streich. The mountain's toponym was officially adopted on March 5, 1935, by the Geographical Names Board of Canada.

== Geology ==
The mountain is composed of sedimentary rock laid down during the Precambrian to Jurassic periods and pushed east and over the top of younger rock during the Laramide orogeny. Specifically, it is Gog quartzite overlaying eroded shale of the Miette Group. Rockslides on the south slope of the mountain have collected into heaps of talus which have been invaded by interstitial ice, thereby turning them into rock glaciers that slowly creep downhill into the Astoria Valley.

== Climate ==
Based on the Köppen climate classification, Oldhorn is located in a subarctic climate zone with cold, snowy winters, and mild summers. Winter temperatures can drop below -20 °C with wind chill factors below -30 °C.

== See also ==
- Geography of Alberta
