= Simon Peak =

Simon Peak may refer to several places:

- Simon Peak (Antarctica)
- Simon Peak (Canada), the highest peak on the Mount Fraser massif on the Alberta/B.C. continental divide
