= Mount Garth =

Mountain in Alberta, Canada

- Location within Alberta

Highest point
- Elevation: 3,043 m (9,984 ft)
- Prominence: 103 m (338 ft)
- Parent peak: Coronation Mountain (3176 m)
- Listing: Mountains of Alberta
- Coordinates: 51°47′56″N 116°54′50″W

Geography
- Country: Canada
- Province: Alberta
- Protected area: Banff National Park
- Parent range: Park Ranges
- Topo map: NTS 82N15 Mistaya Lake

Climbing
- First ascent: 1934 by H.S. Kingman, J. Monroe Thorington, Rudolph Aemmer (guide)

Mount Garth is a summit in Banff National Park, Alberta, Canada located directly south of Coronation Mountain.

Mount Garth was named in 1920 after John McDonald of Garth, a businessman in the fur industry.

== See also ==
- List of mountains in the Canadian Rockies
