= Coronation Mountain =

Mountain in Alberta, Canada

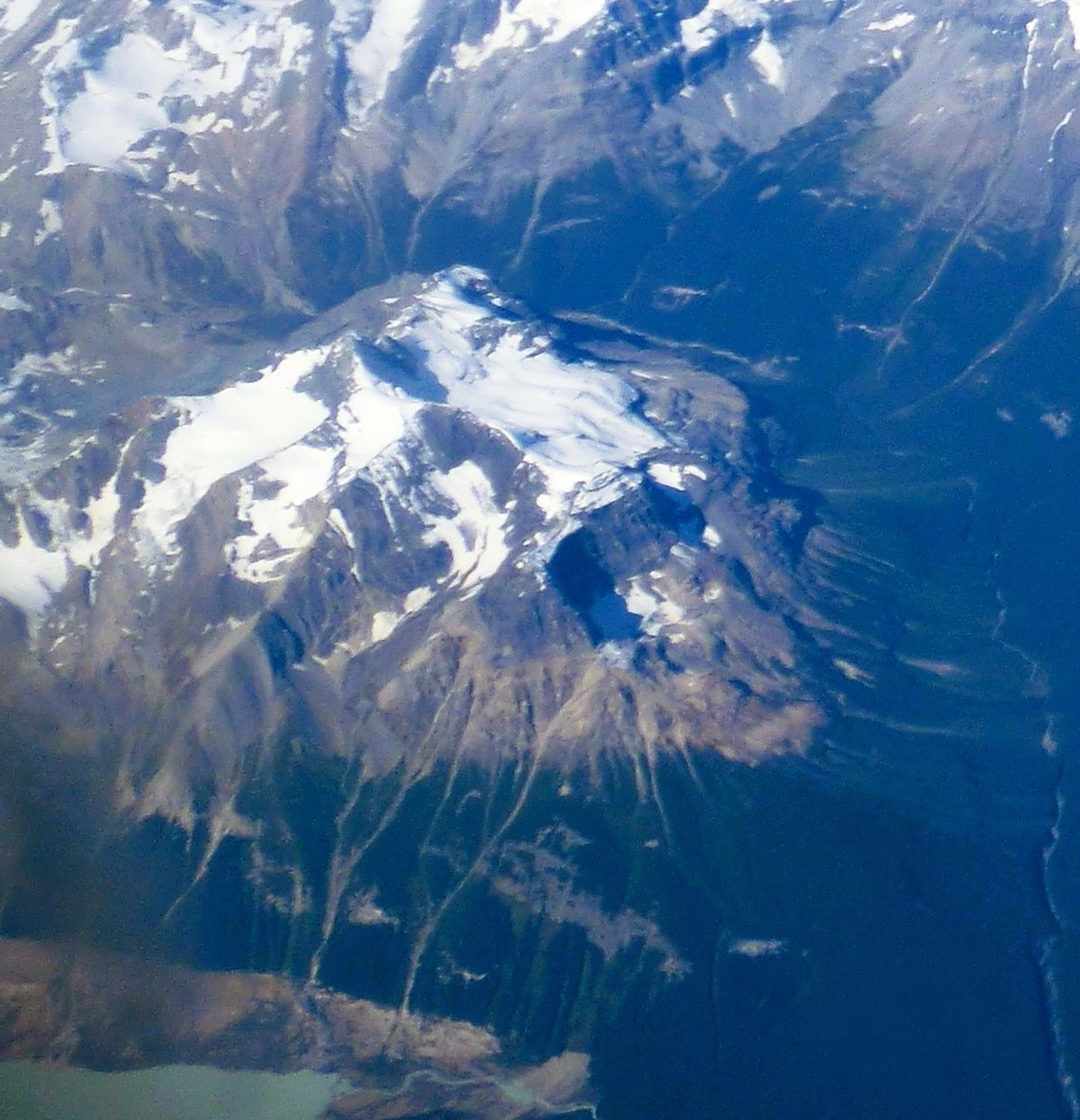
- Airliner view from southeast

Highest point
- Elevation: 3,176 m (10,420 ft)
- Prominence: 436 m (1,430 ft)
- Parent peak: Mount Freshfield (3337 m)
- Listing: Mountains of Alberta
- Coordinates: 51°48′22″N 116°54′31″W

Geography
- Location within Alberta
- Country: Canada
- Province: Alberta
- Protected area: Banff National Park
- Parent range: Park Ranges
- Topo map: NTS 83D9 Amethyst Lakes

Climbing
- First ascent: 1921 by Interprovincial Boundary Commission

Coronation Mountain is a summit in Banff National Park, Alberta, Canada.

Coronation Mountain was named in commemoration of the coronation of King Edward VII and Queen Alexandra.

== Geology ==
Like other mountains in Banff Park, the mountain is composed of sedimentary rock laid down from the Precambrian to Jurassic periods. Formed in shallow seas, this sedimentary rock was pushed east and over the top of younger rock during the Laramide orogeny.

== Climate ==
Based on the Köppen climate classification, Coronation Mountain is located in a subarctic climate zone with cold, snowy winters, and mild summers. Winter temperatures can drop below -20 °C with wind chill factors below -30 °C.
