= Simon Peak (Canada) =

Mountain in the country of Canada

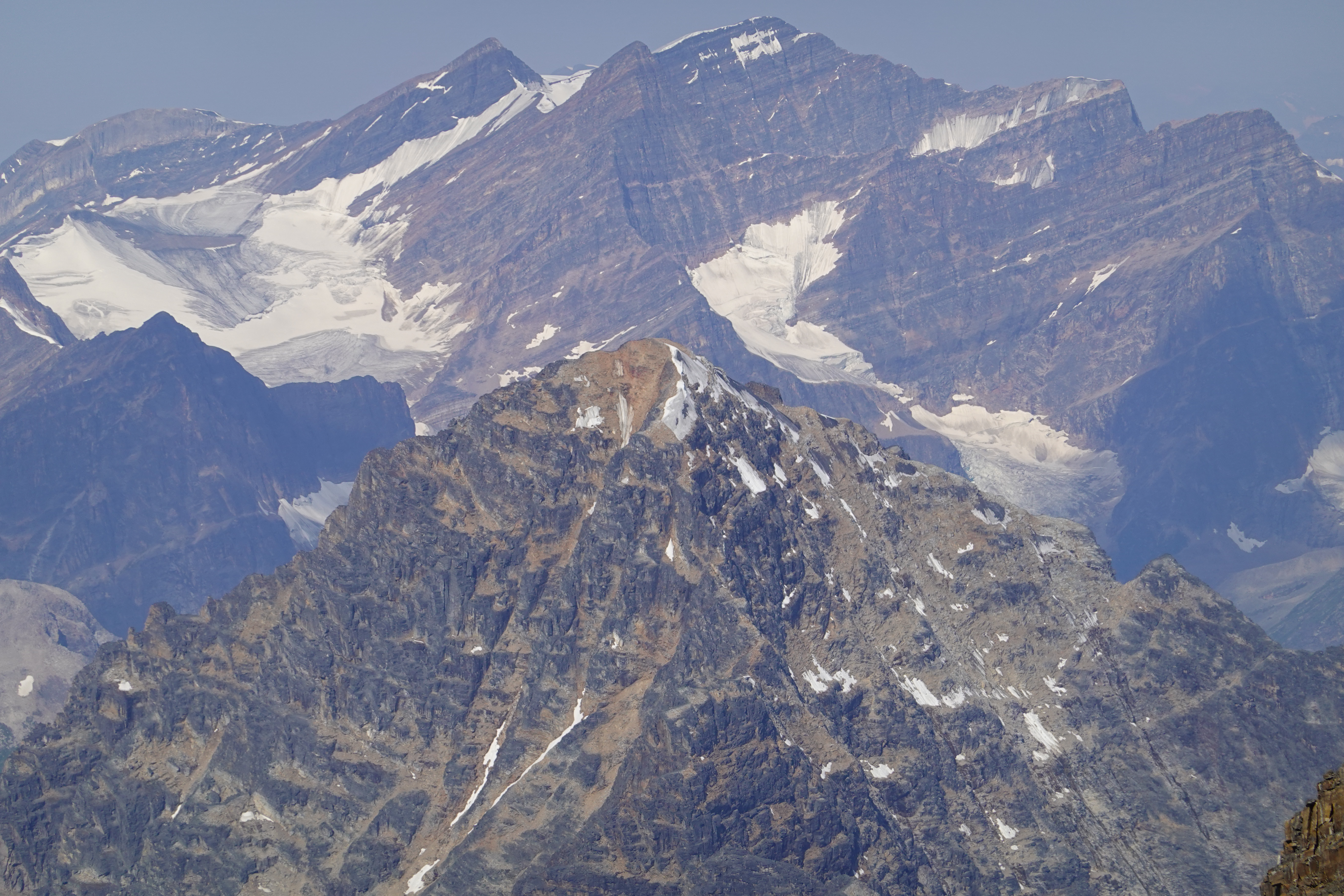
- Simon Peak is highest point at top of frame

Highest point
- Elevation: 3,322 m (10,899 ft)
- Prominence: 1,173 m (3,848 ft)
- Parent peak: Mount Edith Cavell (3363 m)
- Listing: Mountains of Alberta; Mountains of British Columbia
- Coordinates: 52°39′24″N 118°19′06″W

Geography
- Location within Alberta Location within British Columbia Location within Canada
- Country: Canada
- Provinces: Alberta and British Columbia
- Protected areas: Jasper National Park; Mount Robson Provincial Park
- Parent range: Park Ranges
- Topo map: NTS 83D9 Amethyst Lakes

Climbing
- First ascent: 13 July 1924 by Alfred J. Ostheimer, M.M. Strumia, J. Monroe Thorington, Conrad Kain

Simon Peak is located on the border of Alberta and British Columbia, at the Southern end of Mount Robson Provincial Park. It is the highest peak of Mount Fraser. It was named in 1920 by the Alberta-British Columbia Boundary Commission.

== See also ==
- List of peaks on the Alberta–British Columbia border
- List of mountains in the Canadian Rockies
