= Bennington Peak =

Mountain in the country of Canada

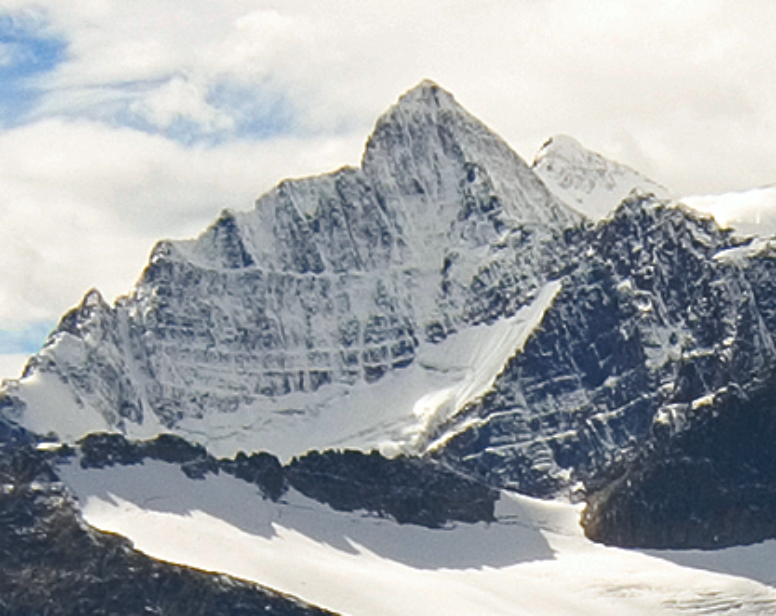

Highest point
- Elevation: 3,260 m (10,700 ft)
- Prominence: 118 m (387 ft)
- Parent peak: McDonnell Peak (3289 m)
- Listing: Mountains of Alberta; Mountains of British Columbia
- Coordinates: 52°39′18″N 118°17′53″W

Geography
- Location within Alberta Location within British Columbia Location within Canada
- Country: Canada
- Provinces: Alberta and British Columbia
- Protected areas: Jasper National Park and Mount Robson Provincial Park
- Parent range: Park Ranges
- Topo map: NTS 83D9 Amethyst Lakes

Climbing
- First ascent: 1926 R.B.M. Bibby, J.H. Hoag, N.W. Spadavecchia
- Easiest route: East Ridge III 5.4; North Face IV 5.7

Bennington Peak is located on the border of Alberta and British Columbia. It was named in 1922 by Arthur O. Wheeler, in commemoration of Bennington, Vermont, the birthplace of explorer Simon Fraser.

== Climate ==
Based on the Köppen climate classification, the mountain is located in a subarctic climate with cold, snowy winters, and mild summers. Temperatures can drop below −20 °C with wind chill factors below −30 °C. In terms of favorable weather, July and August present the best months for climbing. However, these months coincide with mosquito season, which requires effective defenses. Precipitation runoff from the peak drains into tributaries of the Athabasca River on its east side, and the headwaters of the Fraser River from the west side.

== See also ==
- List of peaks on the Alberta–British Columbia border
