= Angel Glacier =

Glacier in Alberta, Canada

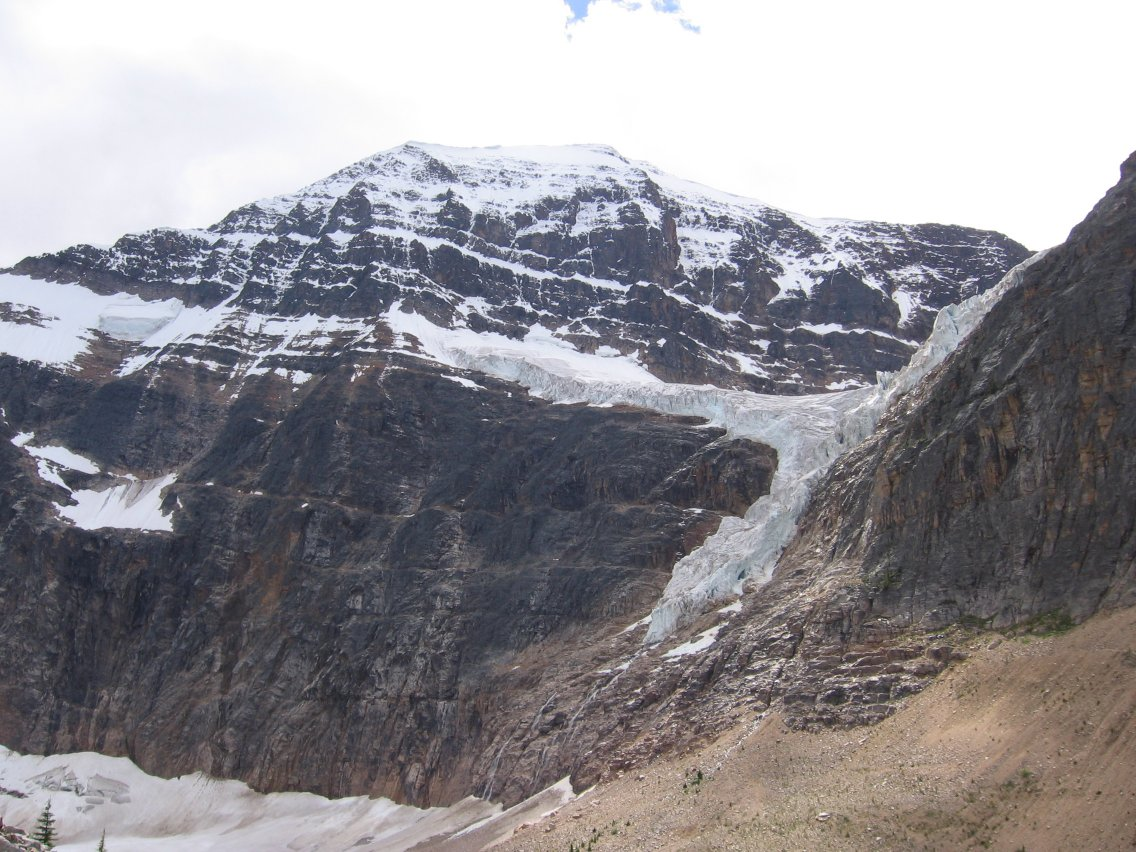
- Angel Glacier on slope of Mount Edith Cavell

- Location within Alberta Location within British Columbia Location within Canada
- Interactive map of Angel Glacier
- Type: Mountain glacier
- Location: Jasper National Park, Alberta, Canada
- Coordinates: 52°40′36″N 118°03′44″W
- Area: 1 square kilometre (0.39 sq mi)
- Length: 1.3 kilometres (0.81 mi)
- Status: Retreating

The Angel Glacier is a hanging glacier which flows down the north face of Mount Edith Cavell in Jasper National Park, Canada. It is named as such because it has the appearance of an angel with out-swept wings.

It was significantly larger when it was named in the 19th century and is melting rapidly. The Angel Glacier used to be continuous with the Cavell Glacier below it. It is expected to continue to recede up the north face of Edith Cavell and most likely disappear. Another hanging glacier on this face, the Ghost Glacier, partially collapsed in August 2012. Falling ice caused a glacial lake to overflow, washing out a parking lot and trails.

All three glaciers are visible from the Cavell Meadows trail.

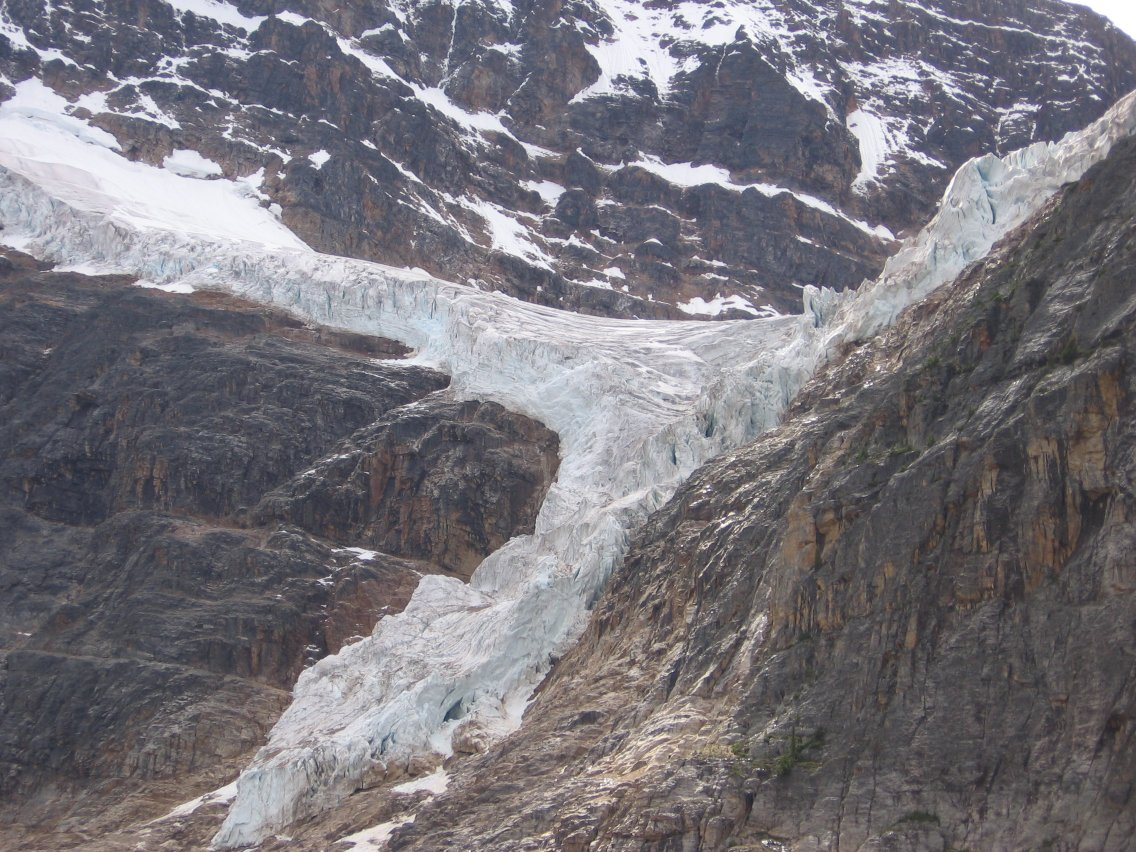
Angel Glacier

== See also ==
- List of glaciers in Canada
