= Tonquin Pass =

Mountain pass in the Canadian Rockies

Coordinates: 52°43′42″N 118°20′22″W

Tonquin Pass, 1948 m (6393 ft), is a mountain pass in the Canadian Rockies, linking Tonquin Valley in Jasper National Park, Alberta, to Mount Robson Provincial Park and adjoining areas of British Columbia. It is at the headwaters of Tonquin Creek, which flows into British Columbia. Located on the interprovincial boundary, it is on the Continental Divide.

Also at the headwaters of Tonquin Creek is Vista Pass.

== See also ==
- List of mountain passes
