= Mountain caribou conservation =

Subspecies of North American reindeer

Boreal woodland caribou (Rangifer tarandus caribou) are a species of caribou and subspecies of North American reindeer. Boreal woodland caribou are also known as southern mountain caribou, woodland caribou, and forest-dwelling caribou. Mountain caribou are uniquely adapted to live in old-growth forests. The mountain caribou diet consists of tree-dwelling lichens predominantly. They are unique in this aspect as in the far northern regions of their habitat zones, the snowpack is shallow enough that the boreal woodland caribou can paw through the snow to eat the ground-dwelling lichens. In the inland Pacific Northwest Rainforests of eastern British Columbia, where the snowpack can reach upwards of five meters, the mountain caribou rely predominantly on the tree-dwelling lichens such as Bryoria spp. and Alectoria spp., hanging above the snowpack. As a result, these mountain caribou are reliant upon the old growth forests, which have been logged for centuries and continue to dwindle.

== History of conservation efforts ==
Conservation efforts began in the mid-50s with the southward expansion of the Wells Gray Provincial Park north of Kamloops, British Columbia and west of Jasper National Park with the focus to protect the dwindling herds of mountain caribou. The areas set aside by further Canadian National Parks – Glacier National Park (Canada), the Purcell Wilderness Conservancy Provincial Park and Protected Area, Valhalla Provincial Park – are not as conducive for the specially adapted caribou as these areas are mostly ice, rock, alpine meadows and sub-alpine parkland and are lacking in the old-growth forests which provide the tree-dwelling lichens pivotal to the mountain caribou diet.

By the 1980s in Canada, the northern areas of the mountain caribou habitat zones had the most remaining mountain caribou as a result of northern forest districts land management programs beginning to set aside old-growth forests specifically for these caribou. In 1983 in the United States, the South Selkirk mountain caribou subpopulation were designated endangered by the Endangered Species Act. Despite these protections afforded to it under the legislation, the mountain caribou declined quickly in number. As the South Selkirk herd languished despite these protections, the US Fish and Wildlife Service augmented the herd from its Canadian brethren in the 1990s, raising population levels to 100. However, the effort was abandoned, and the South Selkirk herd declined again.

In 1994, the Commission on Resources and Environment (CORE), was implemented with the focus on regional planning and implementation of land use while addressing conservation issues. The land use designations were brought together by a synthesis of groups with significant interests in these inland temperate rainforests. The negotiations between public, industrial, and governmental stakeholders forced trade-offs between these various interest groups. There were many interests, with protection of endangered species and forest conservation only constituting two of many. Predominant theory at the time constituted that logging could take place and simultaneously preserve enough of the caribou’s old growth habitat which led to the creation of the Cariboo Mountains Provincial Park amongst others. Despite the focus on protections and conservation of the mountain caribou, herd numbers since the CORE was established have continued to diminish from approximately 2,450 spread across 17 separate isolated subpopulations to 1,900 animals in 15 subpopulations between 1997 and 2002 (Mountain Caribou Technical Advisory Committee, 2002) as a result of the continued logging of old growth in the Kuskanax, Duncan, Lardeau, and Adams River watersheds.

In 2011, following litigation and petitions from multiple environmental conservation organizations, which included the Center for Biological Diversity, the United States Fish and Wildlife Service recommended 375,000 acres for critical habitat protection of the mountain caribou. After opposition from outdoor recreational outfits, mostly snowmobilers who ride on the public lands which would have been set aside for mountain caribou, the US Fish and Wildlife Service scaled back the proposed protected area to 30,000 acres.

In 2019, two local mountain caribou subpopulations, the South Selkirk and South Purcell subspecies, were designated as extinct. In January 2019, the last three survivors of these subpopulations were rounded up by the British Columbian government and sent to a pen near Revelstoke, British Columbia, where the two females and male would join another orphaned mountain caribou named Grace at the pen. The hope and focus would be to allow for continued breeding and eventual release into the wild.

== Environmental threats ==
Erratic weather patterns, an effect of climate change, are having an adverse effect on the mountain caribou. The trend towards more unpredictable and extreme weather patterns and climatic conditions are forcing caribou periodically to leave their safe winter stronghold of the mountains for more marginal lower elevation habitats. The reason being is the constant changes in snowpack – significant snowfall one year to minimal snow the next. The lack of consistency is forcing the caribou to adapt and change their eating patterns to newer growth forests, which lack the lichens that the older growth forests provide for sustenance. Abundant lichens are restricted to forests older than about 100 years.

Moving to these lower elevation habitats force the caribou to move to areas that have been logged historically and allow for increased chances of being killed by [wolves]. Wolves have surged in population in southern British Columbia since 2009 as a result in larger populations of deer and moose that have developed. Wolves focus mostly on deer and moose, however, two mountain caribou from the South Selkirk herd were killed in 2015 by wolves and one caribou has been by a cougar as well.

== Human threats ==
Humans have by and far been the ultimate cause as to why the mountain caribou is now an endangered species. Their habitat has been fragmented into a landscape that cannot provide the security necessary as well as allow for proper food sources as a result of logging, wildfires and floods. British Columbia has been logged since the 1820s, primarily for ship building. The Cariboo Gold Rush in the 1880s opened the interior temperate rainforests to logging which began the destruction of the mountain caribou landscape that continues to this day. As recently as 2019, have new timber permits been designated to continue to log the native habitat of the mountain caribou. With the continued logging of these areas, it provides more conducive breeding ground for deer and moose which in turn attract wolves which are known to kill the caribou.

Forest fires started by loggers and railroaders have also degraded the environment and destruction of the old growth forests. Removal of snow for recreational and industrial purposes, as well as industrial forestry and roads have been shown to impact the predatory behavior as well as winter wolf movements and results in increased kill rates of caribou in previously safe winter areas.

== Current status of conservation ==
Designated as threatened by the Committee on the Status of Endangered Wildlife in Canada in 2011, the historical range of the caribou has shrunk to six different habitat zones, with the Number 1 zone stretching into the Northern Idaho panhandle region with slight overlap in eastern Washington state and far northwestern Montana. The South Selkirk and South Purcell subpopulations were designated as extinct in 2019, as the transboundary South Selkirk herd experienced its local extinction as the last mountain caribou herd in the contiguous United States. As of 2019, estimates state there are less than 1,500 total mountain caribou.
