= Trident Range =

Mountain range in Alberta, Canada

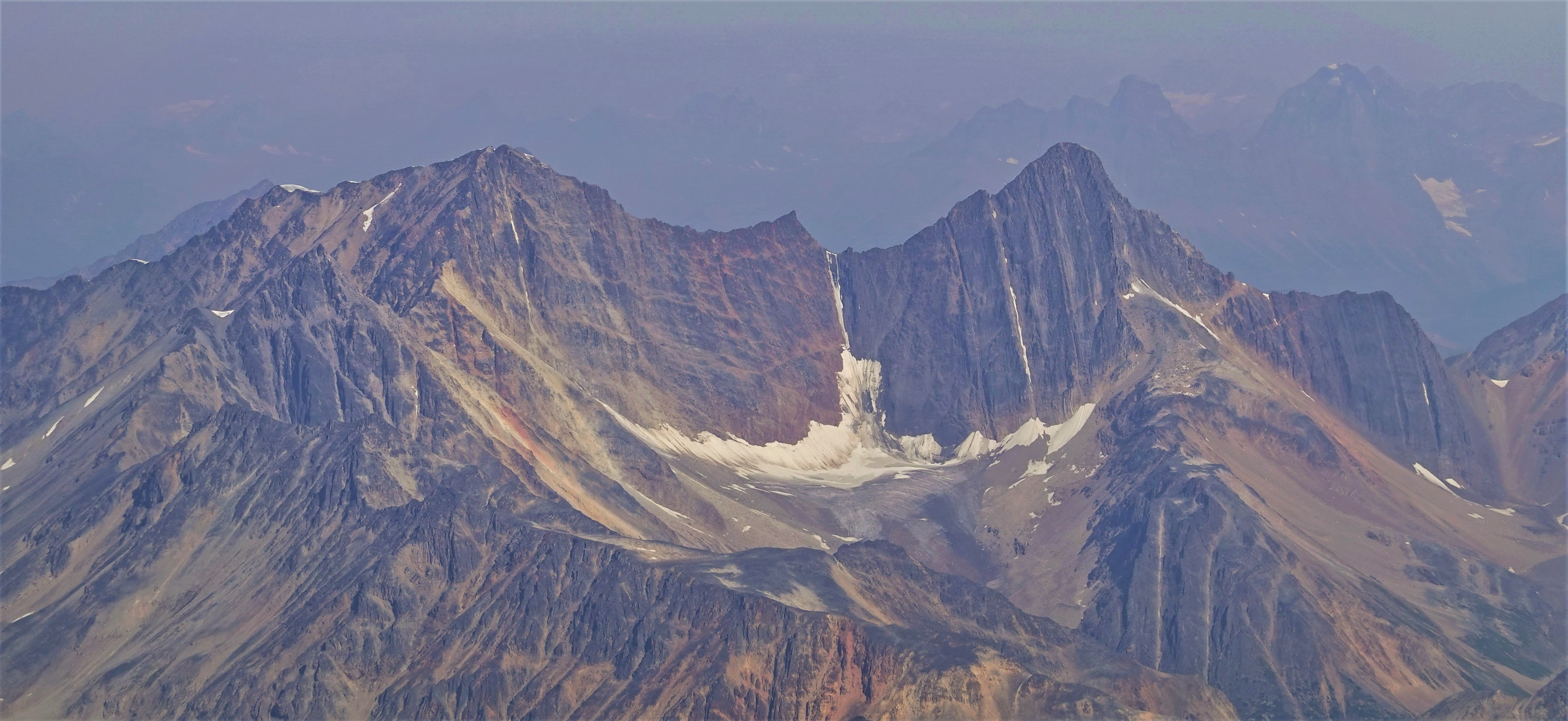
- Majestic Mountain (left) and Mt. Estella (right)

Highest point
- Peak: Majestic Mountain
- Elevation: 3,086 m (10,125 ft)
- Listing: Mountains of Alberta
- Coordinates: 52°40′02″N 118°03′24″W

Geography
- Location within Canada
- Country: Canada
- Province: Alberta
- Range coordinates: 52°45′55″N 118°12′02″W
- Parent range: South Jasper Ranges
- Topo map: NTS 83D16 Jasper

The Trident Range is a sub-range of the South Jasper Ranges in Alberta, Canada.
