= Mount Edith Cavell =

Mountain in Jasper National Park, Alberta, Canada

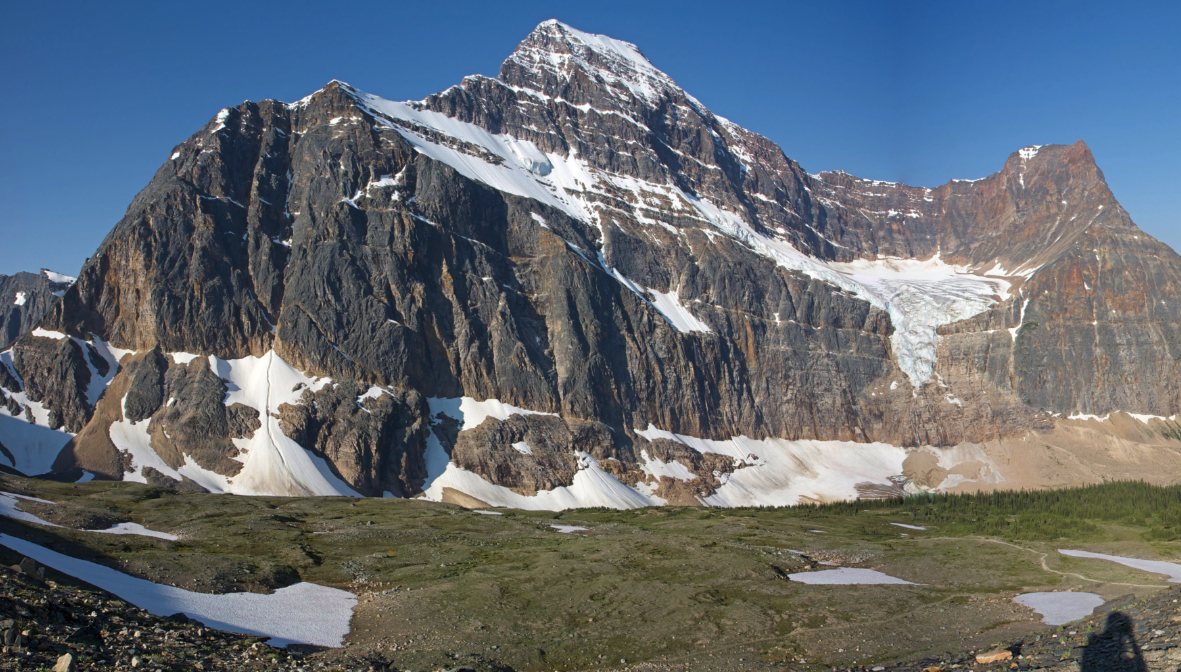
- Mount Edith Cavell and the Angel Glacier

Highest point
- Elevation: 3,363 m (11,033 ft)
- Prominence: 2,007 m (6,585 ft)
- Listing: North America prominent peaks 97th; Canada highest major peaks 49th; Canada most prominent peaks 38th
- Coordinates: 52°40′06″N 118°03′24″W

Geography
- Location within Alberta Location within Canada
- Interactive map of Mount Edith Cavell
- Country: Canada
- Province: Alberta
- Parent range: South Jasper Ranges
- Topo map: NTS 83D9 Amethyst Lakes

Climbing
- First ascent: 1915 by A.J. Gilmour and E.W.D. Holway
- Easiest route: Rock/ice climb, UIAA II

Mount Edith Cavell is a mountain in the Athabasca River and Astoria River valleys of Jasper National Park, and the most prominent peak entirely within Alberta.

The mountain was named in 1916 for Edith Cavell, a British nurse executed by the Germans during World War I for having helped Allied soldiers escape from occupied Belgium to the Netherlands, in violation of German military law. It was previously known as Mount Fitzhugh.

A close-up view of the north face of Mount Edith Cavell is visible after a short hike to Cavell Meadows. The trailhead is by the parking lot at the end of Mount Edith Cavell Road. The trail to the meadows is 3.8 kilometres (2.4 mi) one way, rising 370 metres (1,214 ft) to 2,135 metres (7,005 ft). The Canadian Rockies Trail Guide describes the trail in detail.

The hanging Angel Glacier is visible from Cavell Meadows, which spills over a 300 metres (984 ft) cliff on the north face.

Access to the Tonquin Valley trails can be found about one kilometre before the end of the Mount Edith Cavell Road. There is a parking area across from the Mount Edith Cavell Hostel. A short walk down the gravel path leads to the north end of Cavell Lake. There is small bridge across the stream that empties the lake. From here there are good views with the lake in the foreground and the Mount Edith Cavell massif in the background.

It is believed that one of the world's largest glacial erratics, called Big Rock, near Okotoks, Alberta, was once part of Mount Edith Cavell. The erratic was formed approximately ten thousand years ago when a large portion of quartzite stone was stripped away from the mountain along with the receding Athabasca River Valley glacier.

== Climbing routes ==
There are several popular climbing routes, including:

- West Ridge (normal route): Yosemite Decimal System II
- East Ridge: Yosemite Decimal System III, 5.3
- North Face, East Summit: Yosemite Decimal System IV, 5.8

The North Face route is included as a classic climb in Steck and Roper's Fifty Classic Climbs of North America.

== Notable ascents ==
- 1961 North Face, IV 5.7, First ascent by Yvon Chouinard, Fred Beckey and Dan Doody. July 20–21.
- 1966 North Face, Second ascent by Denny Eberl and Gray Thompson. July 30, 1966.
- 1967 North Face, First solo ascent by Royal Robbins.
- 1981 North Face, Second solo ascent by Dane Burns- North Face, via the Chouinard, Becky, Doody. 7hrs from the parking lot to the summit, with a direct line left of the Angle Glacier on the lower slopes and directly up the shale at the summit.

== In philately ==
Mount Edith Cavell was featured on a $1 Canadian stamp issued on December 4, 1930.

== Climate ==
Based on the Köppen climate classification, the mountain is in a subarctic climate zone with cold, snowy winters, and mild summers. Temperatures can drop below −20 °C with wind chill factors below −30 °C. Precipitation runoff from the mountain drains into tributaries of the Athabasca River.

== Gallery ==
Snow is often evident and the lake begins to freeze over by early October.

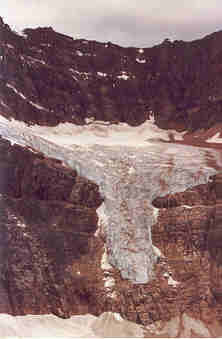
Angel Glacier in 1992

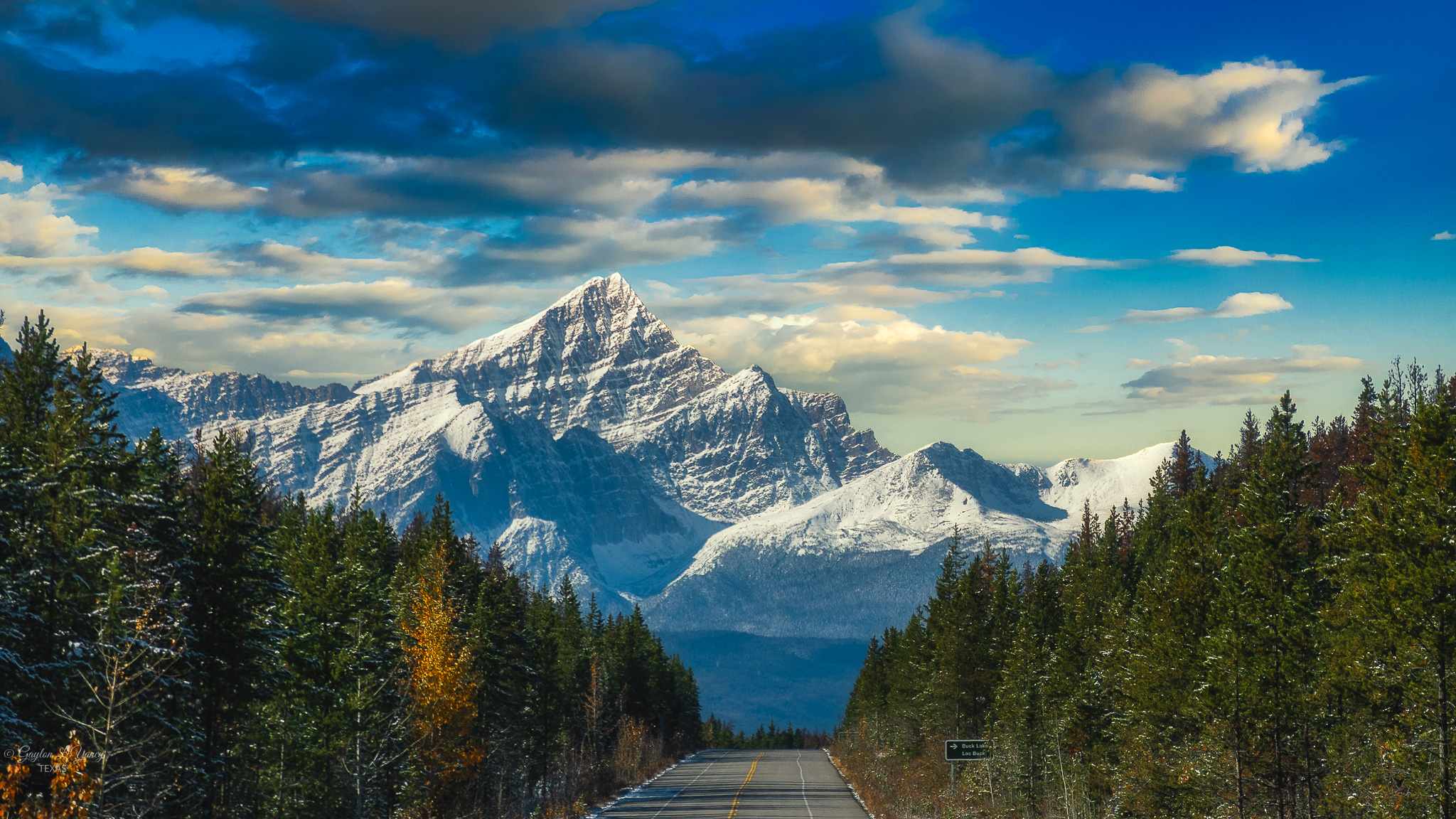
Mount Edith Cavell from Icefields Parkway

== See also ==
- List of mountains of Alberta
- Mountain peaks of Canada
- Mountain peaks of North America
- Mountain peaks of the Rocky Mountains
- Rocky Mountains
