= Astoria River =

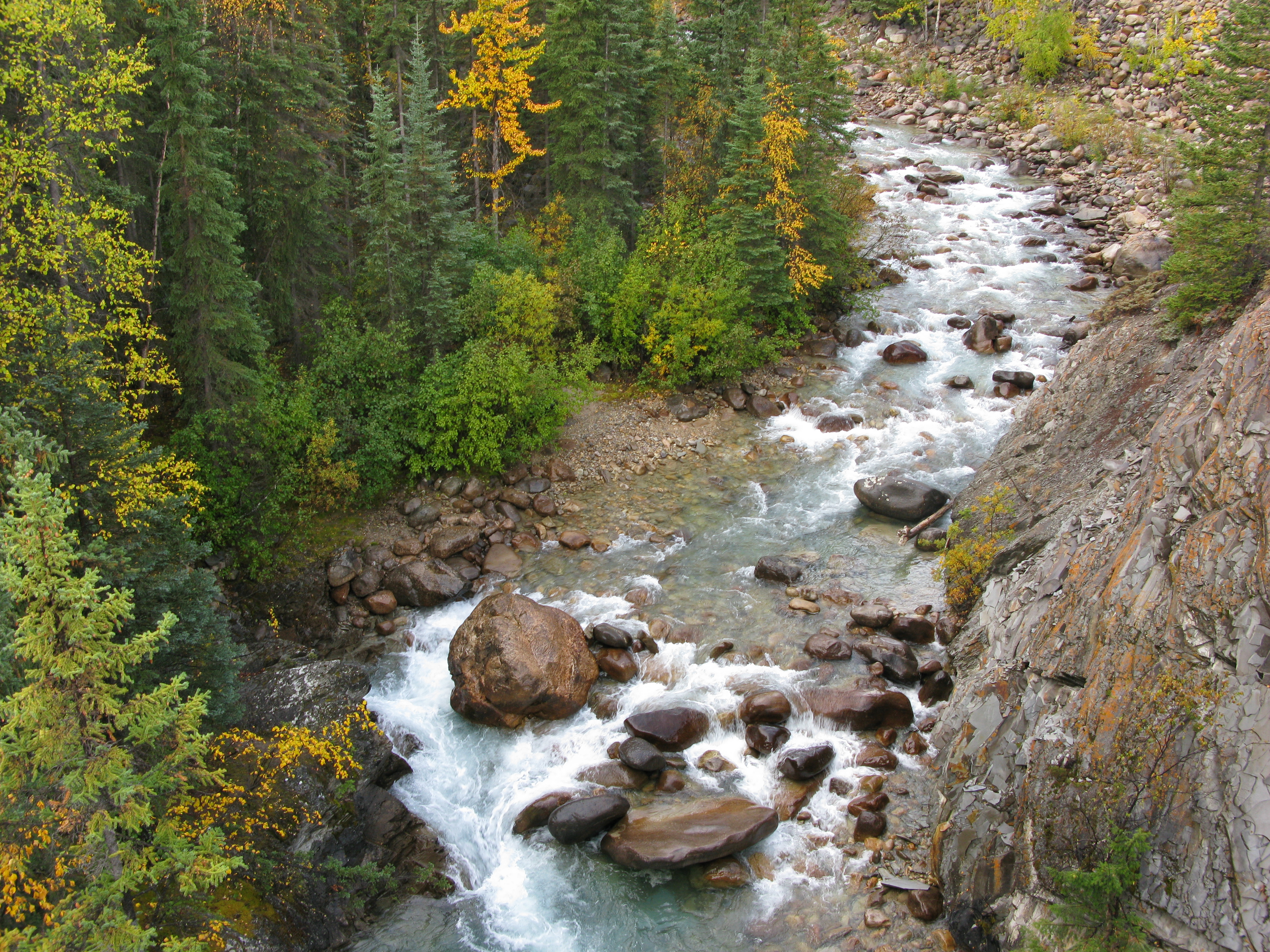
- The Astoria River before its confluence with the Athabasca River

Location
- Country: Canada
- Province: Alberta

Physical characteristics
- Source
  - location: Tonquin Valley
  - coordinates: 52°41′03″N 118°14′59″W
  - elevation: 1,983 m (6,506 ft)
- Mouth
  - location: Athabasca River
  - coordinates: 52°47′57″N 118°01′13″W
  - elevation: 1,080 m (3,540 ft)

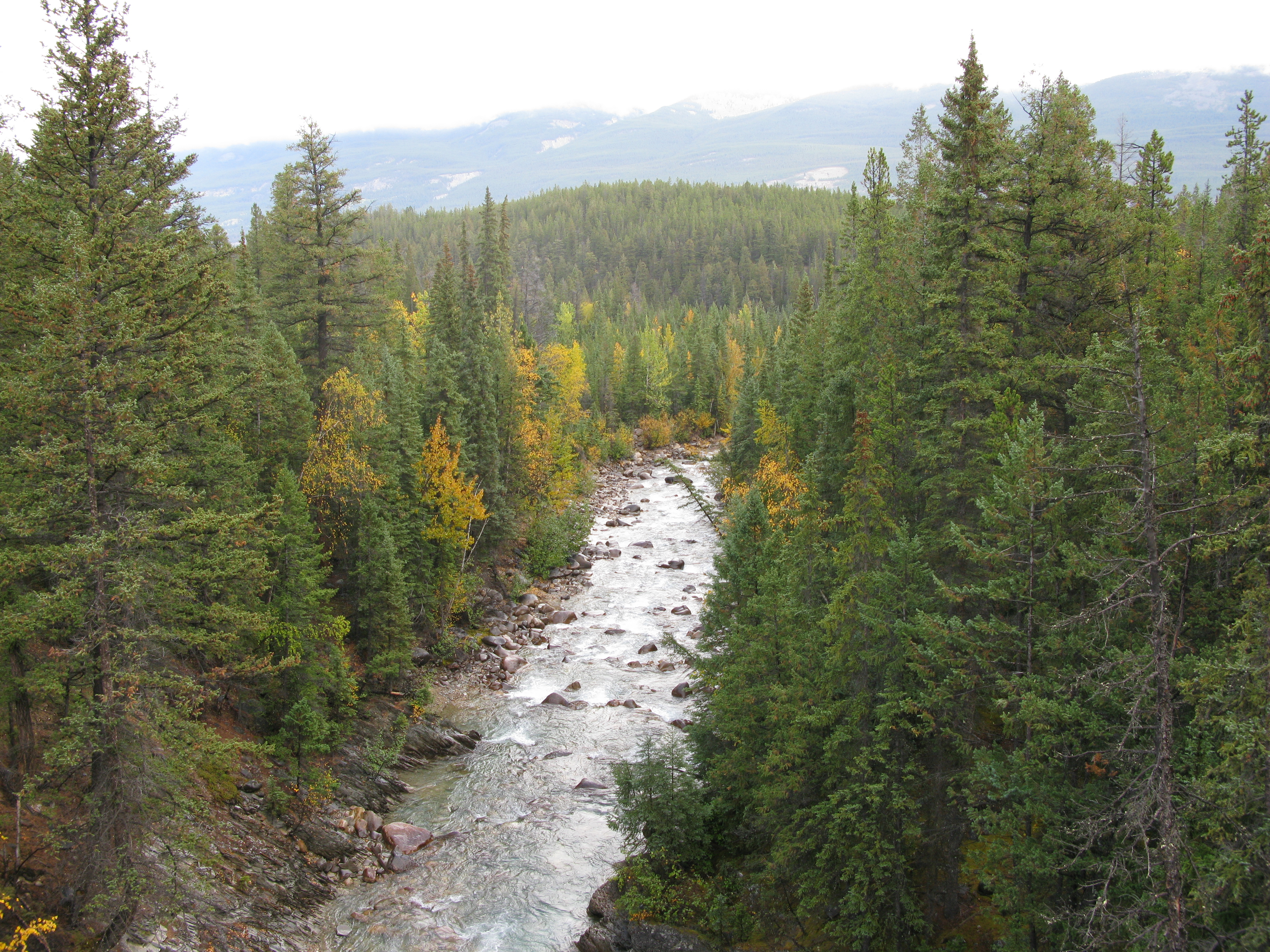
The Astoria in Jasper National Park

The Astoria River is a short river in Jasper National Park, Alberta, Canada. It is an early tributary of the Athabasca River.

The Astoria forms in the Tonquin Valley, collecting meltwater from the Fraser Glacier, The Ramparts, Mount Erebus, Mount Clitheroe, and Oldhorn Mountain.

The Astoria River, as well as nearby Astoria Pass, are named after John Jacob Astor. Fur traders of the American Fur Company, owned by Astor, traveled east over Athabasca Pass from Fort Astoria, at the mouth of the Columbia River.

== Tributaries ==
- Eremite Creek
- Campus Creek
- Verdant Creek

== See also ==
- List of Alberta rivers
