= Tonquin Valley =

Valley in Alberta, Canada

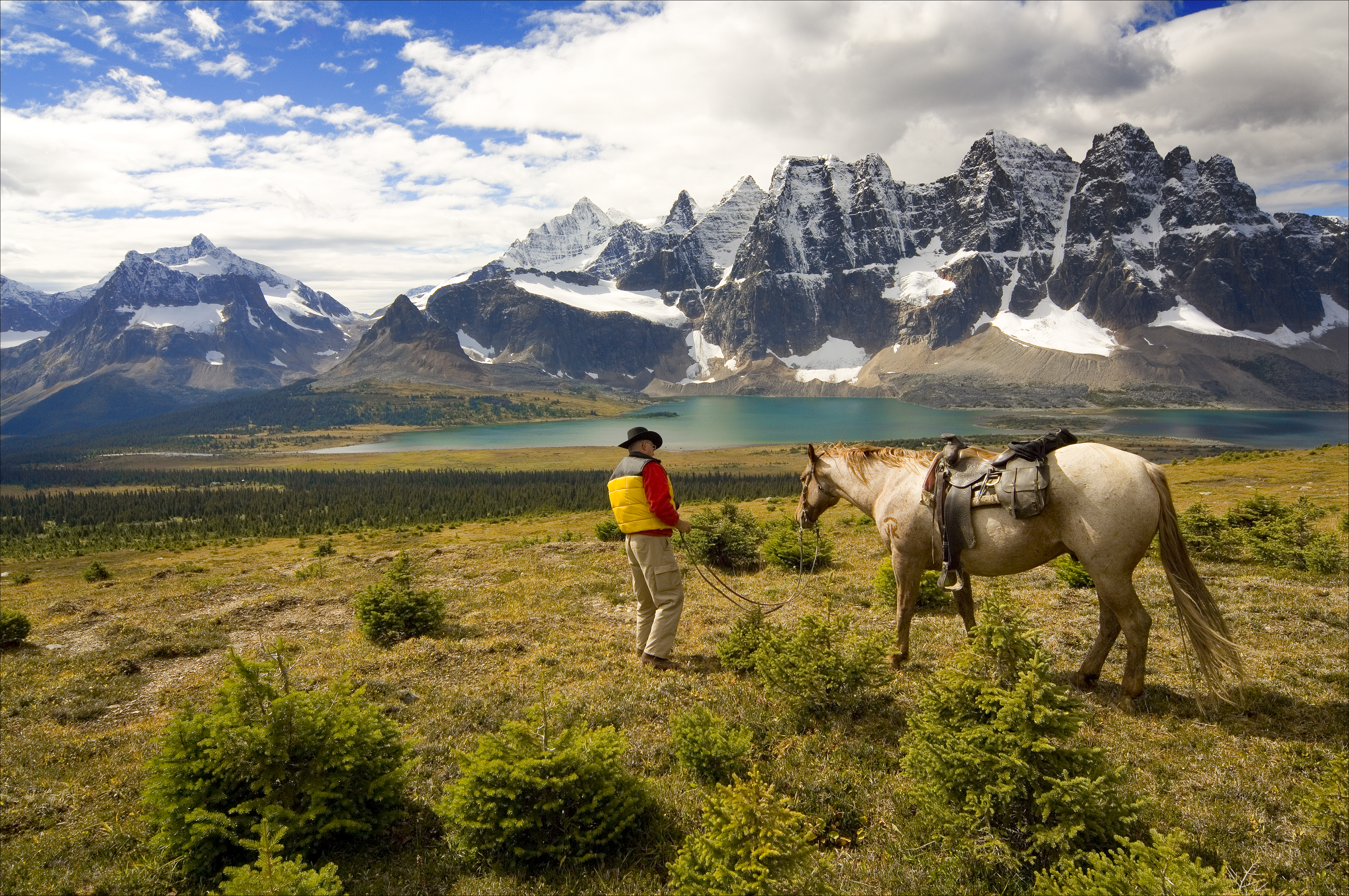
- Horse and rider overlooking Tonquin Valley

- Location within Alberta

Geography
- Country: Canada
- Province: Alberta
- Protected area: Jasper National Park
- Coordinates: 52°43′05″N 118°16′04″W
- Topo map: NTS 83D09

Location

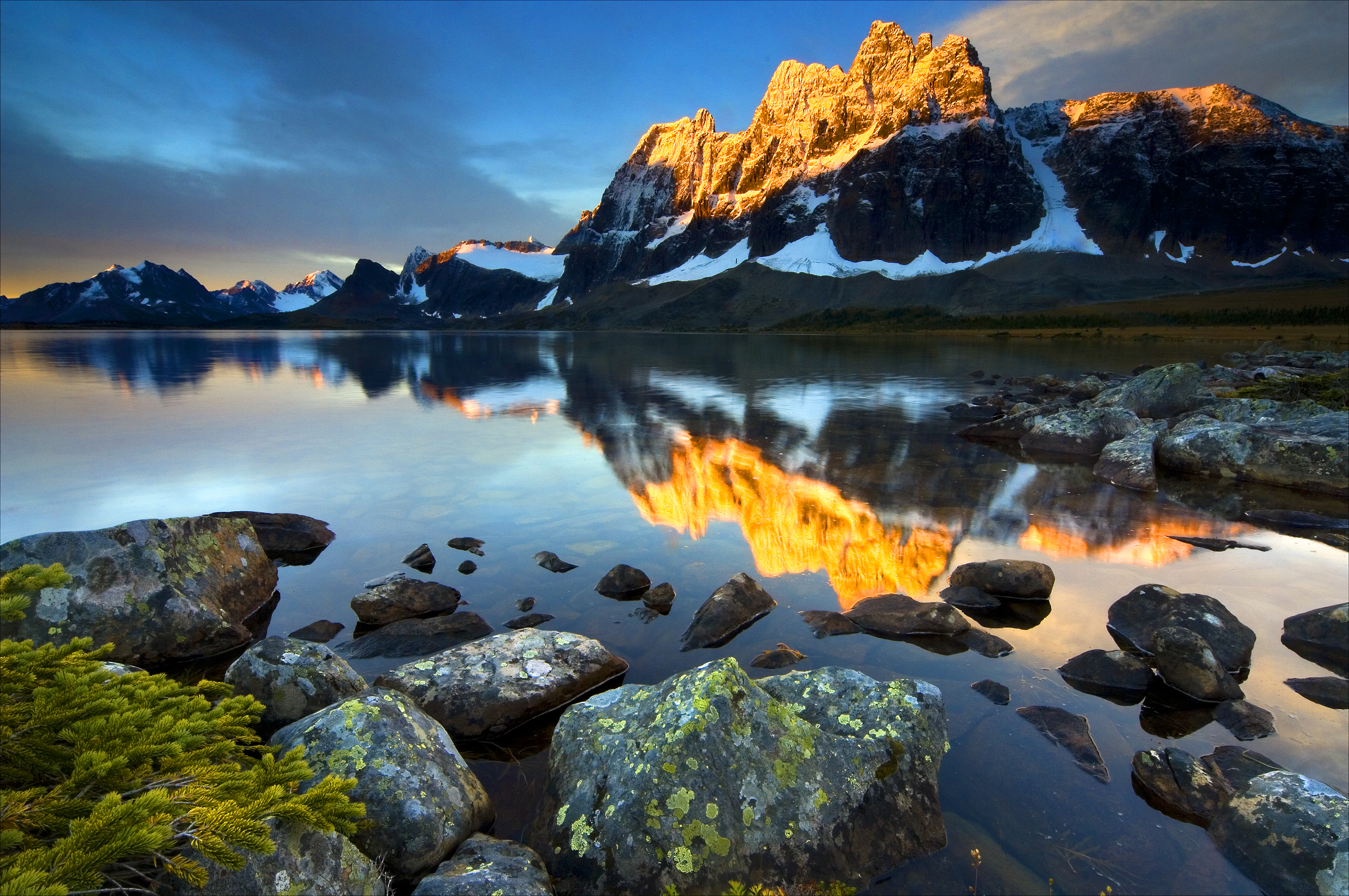
The Rampart Mountains behind Amethyst Lakes at sunrise.

The Tonquin Valley is a backcountry area in Jasper National Park, Alberta, Canada popular for hiking, backpacking, and mountaineering. The Tonquin features views of The Ramparts mountain range, which rises above Amethyst Lakes. It also boasts populations of rare wildlife such as mountain caribou, grizzly bears, and wolverines.

Horseback riding and ski touring were major forms of recreation in the Tonquin Valley since the 1920s, however concerns about the Tonquin caribou herd have largely eliminated these activities in the area. In 2021, Jasper National Park banned recreational horse use in the area and implemented a winter closure between November and mid-February. Starting in 2022, the closure was extended until May 15, effectively eliminating the ski season.

The Tonquin Valley was named after the Pacific Fur Company ship Tonquin, destroyed in Clayoquot Sound in 1811.

== History ==
The valley was explored by Dominion Land Surveyor Morrison P. Bridgland in 1915, via Whistler's Pass. A report from the Department of the Interior describes early tourism to the Tonquin Valley:

The reports of the region early attracted the attention of visitors to the park and soon adventurous spirits took ponies and followed the old Indian trails by way of Whistlers' pass or Astoria valley, returning to say that the rumour of its wonders was only a half-told tale.

Due to the difficulty of these routes (surveyor A. O. Wheeler called the Whistlers route, “the very worst trail the writer knows of”), a new trail up Portal Creek was developed during World War I. In the 1920s, entering by Portal Creek and exiting on a trail down Meadow Creek to the Geike railway station became the standard 33.8 kilometres (21.0 mi) route.

In 1926 the Alpine Club of Canada (ACC) held their 21st General Mountaineering Camp at Moat Lake, their first of many in this area. The 1928 High Trip of the Sierra Club took place in this area, reusing some of the same ACC tents at Moat Lake. Among those who participated were photographer Ansel Adams and Sierra Club director William Colby.

The ACC built the Memorial hut at the south end of Tonquin Valley, on Penstock Creek north of Outpost Lake in 1930. Its foundation gave out in 1947 and the Wates-Memorial hut was built on the shore of Outpost Lake. The current, larger, Wates-Gibson hut replaced it in 1959. Cyril Wates and Rex Gibson were active alpinists in the area.

Local guide and outfitter Fred Brewster established one of his Rocky Mountain Camps on Amethyst Lakes in 1935, bringing in tourists for ski and horseback trips. He sold his Tonquin Valley camp to Tom Vinson in 1956, and it continued to operate under various owners as Tonquin Valley Adventures until being bought out and closed by Parks Canada in October 2022.

== Recreation ==
=== Hiking and Backpacking ===
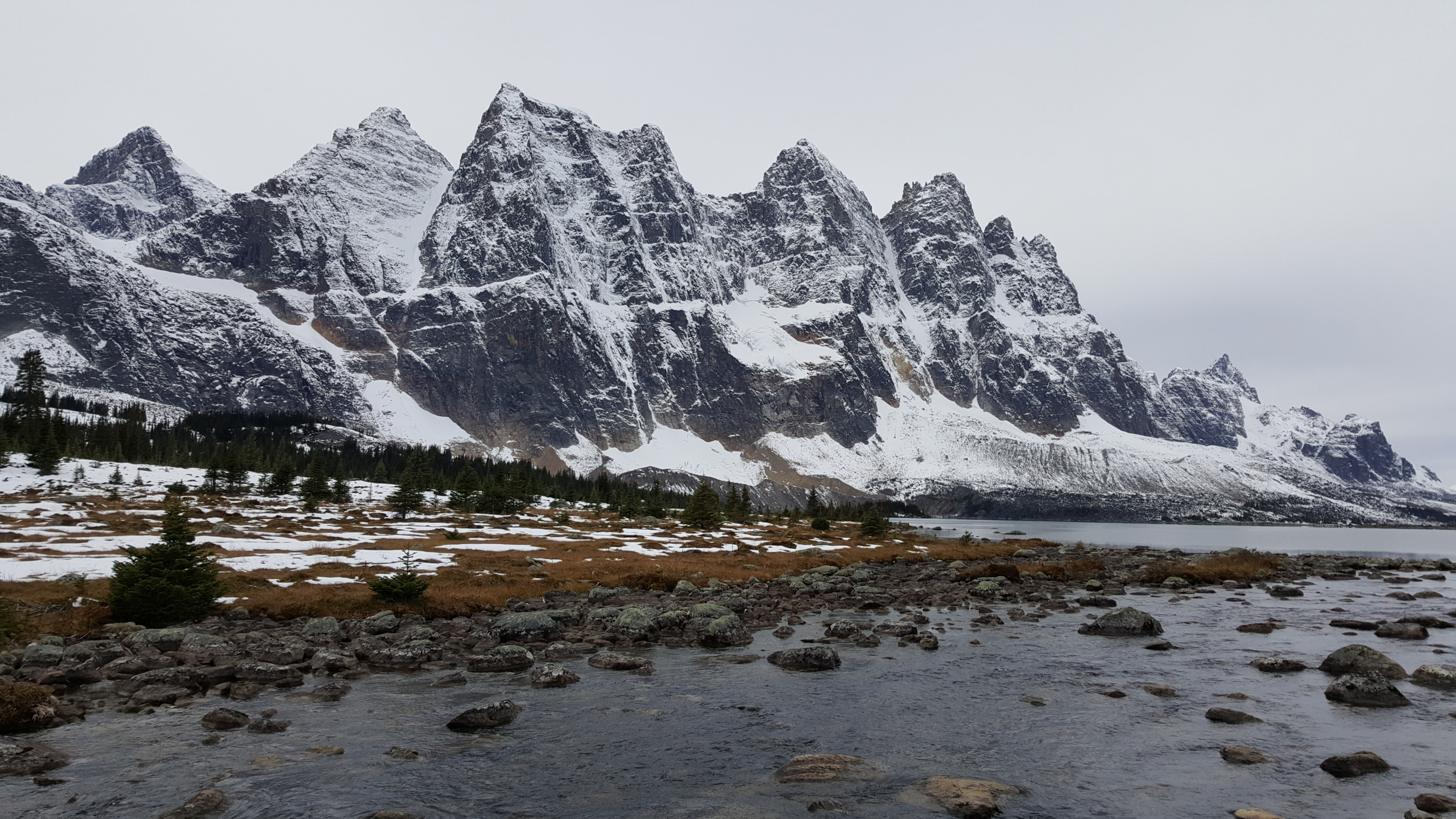
The Ramparts from the south end of Amethyst Lake

The main Tonquin Valley Loop trail (#105) is 43.1 kilometres (26.8 mi) and U-shaped, with trailheads at Portal Creek on the Marmot Road and Astoria River on the Cavell Road. It is designated by Jasper National Park as High Priority, which means that it should receive regular inspections and repairs as soon as issues are reported. The area is open from May 16 through October 31. No dogs or fires are permitted.

The other official trails are:

- Chrome Lake (#106), a connector between the main Loop near Astoria campground to Surprise Point campground via the junction at Chrome Lake,
- Wates-Gibson ACC Hut (#107), a short trail from Chrome Lake to the ACC hut,
- Tonquin Valley Backcountry Lodge (#108) which crosses the meadow north of Amethyst Lakes to the site of the former private lodge,
- Maccarib lookout (#109) ascends from Maccarib campground to a viewpoint overlooking the valley.

There are also unofficial routes of varying difficulty to features such as Moat Lake, Tonquin Hill, Eremite Valley, Campus Pass, and Verdant Pass.

=== Mountaineering ===
As of 2025, the Alpine Club of Canada has held 8 of their annual General Mountaineering Camps in the Tonquin Valley area, most recently in 1985. The Ramparts are a frequent target; the 1926 camp reported attempts on nearby Mount Geike, Redoubt Peak, and Turret Peak and classic routes are still regularly climbed.

=== Backcountry Skiing ===
Ski touring has been a popular activity in the Tonquin Valley going back to the 1930s when the ACC began hosting ski camps. There are a variety of routes in low-avalanche risk terrain. Prior to 2022, a popular day trip took the Portal Creek trail up to Maccarib Pass for runs down moderate grade slopes with options for steeper lines. Longer trips to Eremite Valley, Fraser Pass, Amethyst Lakes, and Moat Lake were facilitated by two backcountry lodges and an ACC hut.

In order to reduce unnatural levels of predator access to the endangered Tonquin caribou herd, Jasper National Park began winter closures of the Tonquin Valley in 2021. Since 2022, the area is closed between November 1 and May 15.

== Amenities ==
Within the valley, Parks Canada maintains 7 backcountry campgrounds, which provide tent pads, picnic tables, bear lockers, and open-air barrel or pit toilets:

Campground	Distance from Astoria River Trailhead	Distance from Portal Creek Trailhead	Elevation	Tent pads
Astoria	7.1 kilometres (4.4 mi)	36 kilometres (22 mi)	1,690 metres (5,540 ft)	4
Switchback	13.6 kilometres (8.5 mi)	29.5 kilometres (18.3 mi)	2,067 metres (6,781 ft)	8
Clitheroe	16.9 kilometres (10.5 mi)	26.2 kilometres (16.3 mi)	2,080 metres (6,820 ft)	8
Surprise Point	19.1 kilometres (11.9 mi)	28.4 kilometres (17.6 mi)	1,978 metres (6,490 ft)	4
Amethyst	20.1 kilometres (12.5 mi)	23 kilometres (14 mi)	1,985 metres (6,512 ft)	8
Maccarib	23.5 kilometres (14.6 mi)	19.6 kilometres (12.2 mi)	2,012 metres (6,601 ft)	8
Portal	34.4 kilometres (21.4 mi)	8.7 kilometres (5.4 mi)	1,979 metres (6,493 ft)	4

The Alpine Club of Canada runs the Wates-Gibson hut at Outpost Lake, approximately 19 kilometres (12 mi) from the Astoria River trailhead. The lower level has tables, benches, propane lamps and ranges, a wood stove, and kitchen utensils. The upstairs has mattresses for up to 26 people. There is a nearby outhouse.

In 2021, both the hostel near the Astoria River trailhead and the ACC hut announced that they would voluntarily close all winter to support caribou conservation.

There were two private backcountry lodges on Amethyst Lake: Tonquin Valley Adventures on the south shore and Tonquin Valley Backcountry Lodge on the north shore. They were bought out by Parks Canada and closed in the fall of 2022.

== Geography ==
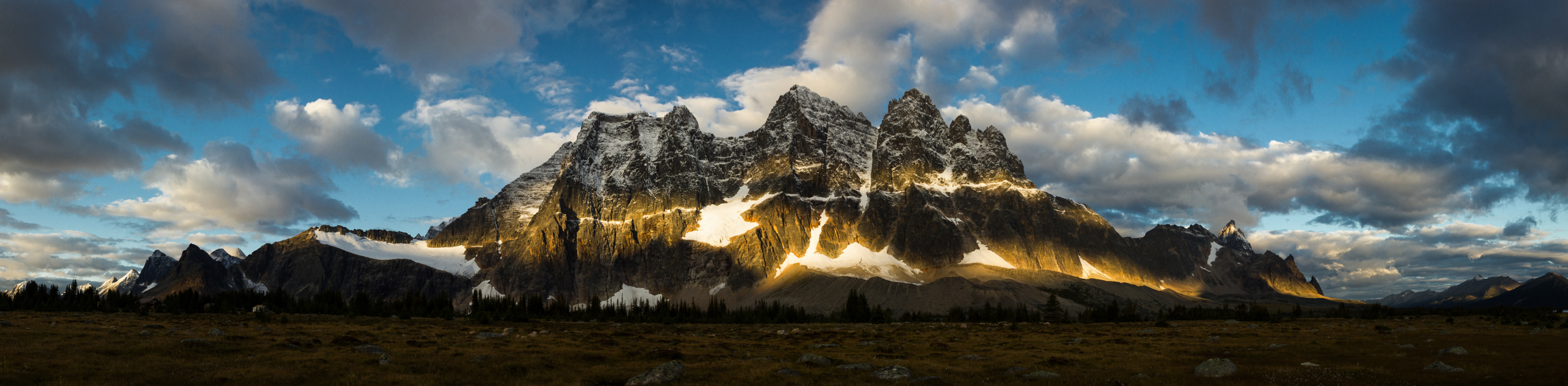
Sunrise and cloud shadows on the Tonquin Valley ramparts

The Tonquin Valley, which cradles Amethyst Lakes, runs roughly north–south, parallel to the 1,000-metre (3,300 ft) Precambrian quartzite wall of the Ramparts, part of the South Jasper Range. Tonquin Pass and Moat Lake form a gap into British Columbia between the north end of the Ramparts and Tonquin Hill.

Tonquin Valley abuts the boundary between Jasper National Park and Mount Robson Provincial Park in British Columbia, which is also the continental divide. Tonquin Creek flows northwest from Tonquin Pass into British Columbia, and empties into the Pacific Ocean via the Fraser River. The Astoria River drains from the south end of Amethyst Lakes into the Athabasca River and then on to the Arctic Ocean.

== Wildlife ==
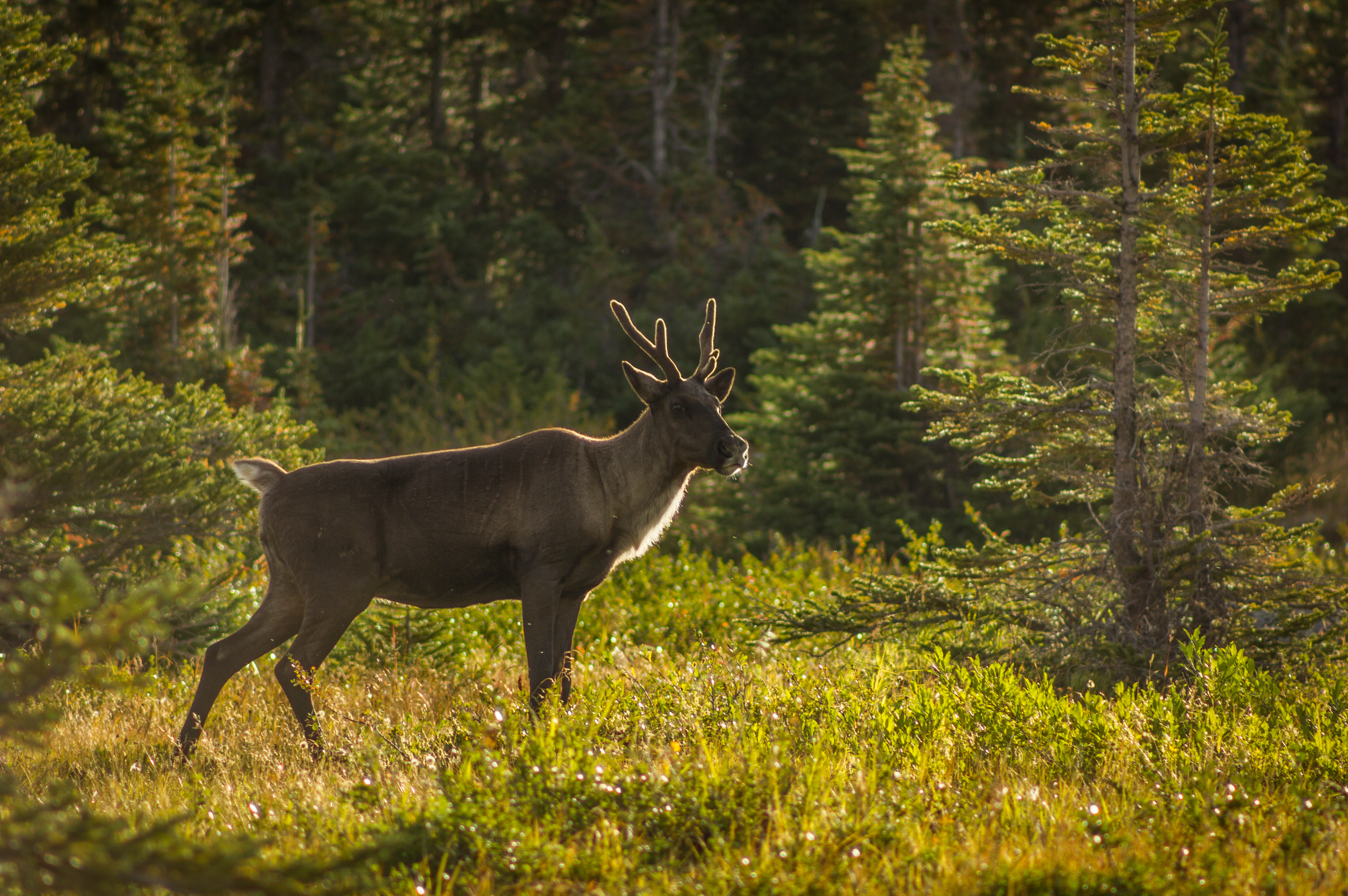
Southern mountain caribou in the Tonquin Valley

The Tonquin Valley area is high quality habitat for grizzly bears, black bears, and mountain caribou, as well as other animals. Amethyst and Moat lakes were stocked with rainbow trout in the 1930s.

=== Tonquin Caribou Herd ===
Jasper National Park's fall 2023 survey estimated a herd size of 45, but with just 10 reproductive females. The park believes this is too few to recover the Tonquin herd naturally, and puts the population at risk of extirpation by predation, disease, or avalanches. Historically, the herd numbered in the hundreds but management practices and human disturbance caused a rapid decline beginning in the 1970s.
