= Geikie =

Geikie is a surname. Notable people with the surname include:

- Archibald Geikie (1835–1924), Scottish geologist and writer
- Georgina Geikie (born 1984), British sport shooter
- James Geikie (1839–1915), Scottish geologist
- John Cunningham Geikie (1824–1906), Scottish Presbyterian minister and writer
- Walter Geikie (1795–1837), Scottish painter

== See also ==
- Geikie Gorge, Western Australia
- Geikie, Alberta, Canada
- Geikie River, Saskatchewan, Canada
- Mount Geikie (Canada)
