= Bastion Peak (Canada) =

Mountain on Alberta/British Columbia boundary in Canada

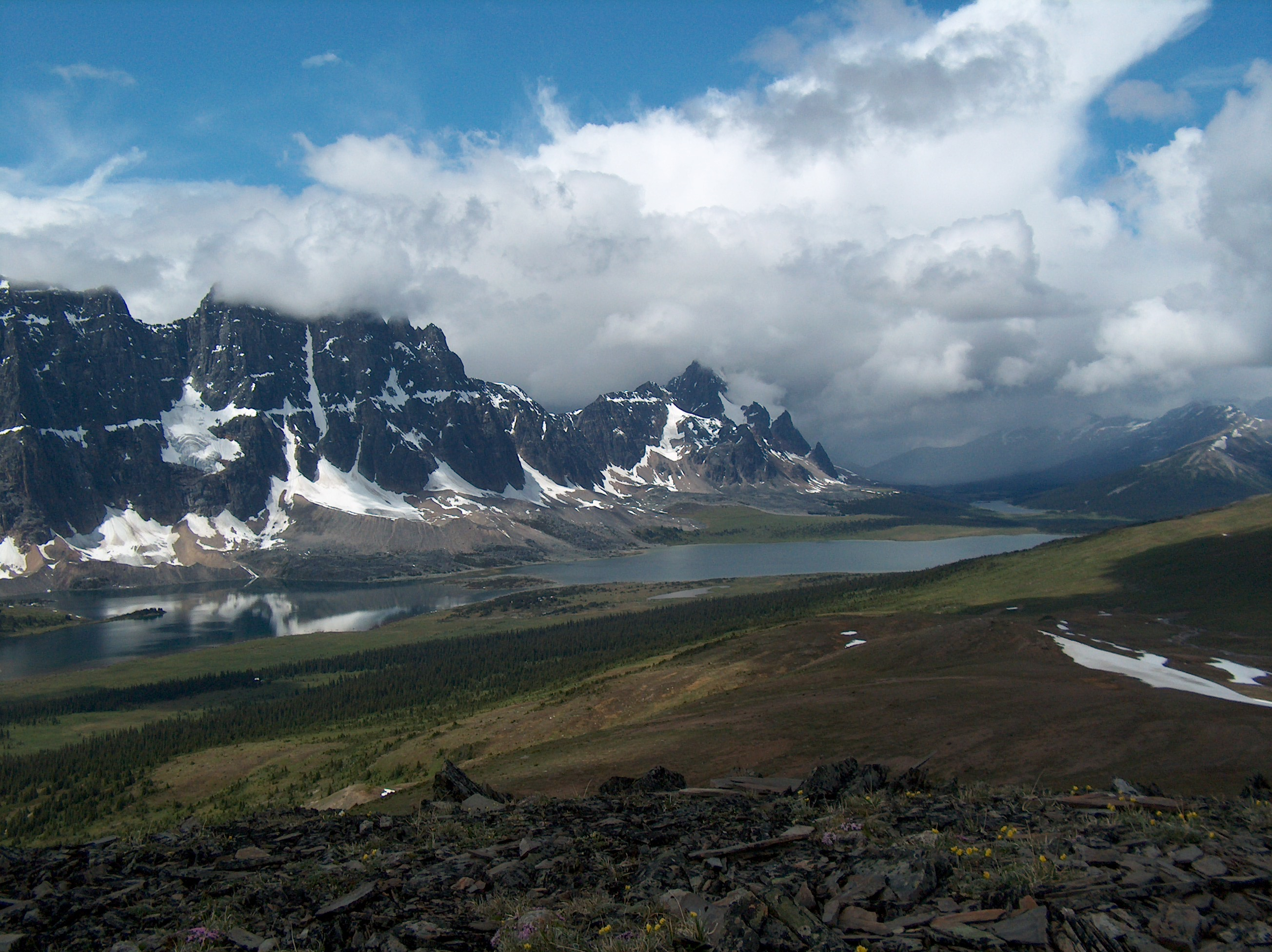
- Bastion Peak in the very center of frame with Dungeon Peak and Redoubt Peak of The Ramparts to left

Highest point
- Elevation: 2,994 m (9,823 ft)
- Prominence: 447 m (1,467 ft)
- Parent peak: Mount Geikie (3298 m)
- Listing: Mountains of Alberta; Mountains of British Columbia
- Coordinates: 52°42′32″N 118°20′41″W

Geography
- Location within Alberta Location within British Columbia Location within Canada
- Country: Canada
- Provinces: Alberta and British Columbia
- Parent range: Park Ranges; Canadian Rockies
- Topo map: NTS 83D9 Amethyst Lakes

Climbing
- First ascent: 1925 J.W.A. Hickson, Howard Palmer, H. Kohler
- Easiest route: East Face IV 5.7

Bastion Peak is a 2,994-metre (9,823 ft) mountain summit located on the shared border of Jasper National Park in Alberta, and Mount Robson Provincial Park in British Columbia, Canada. It is situated in the Tonquin Valley of the Canadian Rockies. It was named in 1916 by Édouard-Gaston Deville because it has an appearance similar to that of a bastion on a castle. Its nearest higher peak is Turret Mountain, 1.6 km (0.99 mi) to the west, and its greater parent is Mount Geikie 3 km (1.9 mi) to the west.

== Climate ==
Based on the Köppen climate classification, Bastion Peak is located in a subarctic climate with cold, snowy winters, and mild summers. Temperatures can drop below −20 °C (−4 °F) with wind chill factors below −30 °C (−22 °F). Precipitation runoff from Bastion Peak drains into tributaries of the Athabasca River on its east side, and tributaries of the Fraser River from the west side.

== See also ==
- List of peaks on the Alberta–British Columbia border
