= Outpost Peak =

Mountain in Alberta, Canada

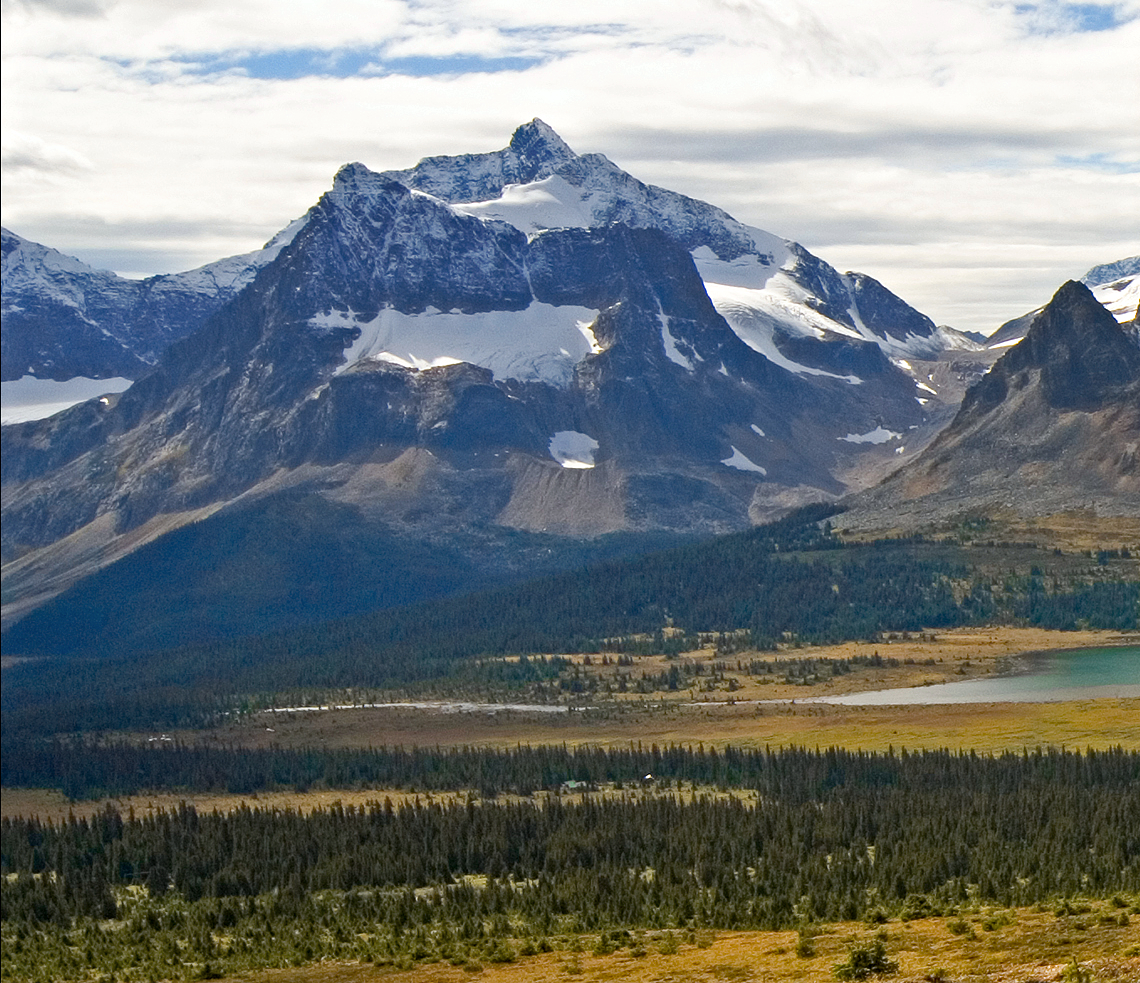
- Outpost Peak seen in front of Mt. Erebus

Highest point
- Elevation: 2,880 m (9,450 ft)
- Prominence: 160 m (520 ft)
- Parent peak: Mount Erebus (3112 m)
- Listing: Mountains of Alberta
- Coordinates: 52°38′57″N 118°15′14″W

Geography
- Location within Alberta Location within Canada
- Country: Canada
- Province: Alberta
- Protected area: Jasper National Park
- Parent range: Park Ranges; Canadian Rockies
- Topo map: NTS 83D9 Amethyst Lakes

Geology
- Rock age: Cambrian
- Rock type: Sedimentary rock

Climbing
- Easiest route: Mountaineering

Outpost Peak is a 2,880-metre (9,450-foot) double peak mountain located in the Tonquin Valley of Jasper National Park in Alberta, Canada. The northeast peak is identified on some maps as Outpost Peak, but the southwest peak is higher. Outpost Peak is composed of sedimentary rock laid down during the Cambrian period, then was pushed east and over the top of younger rock during the Laramide orogeny. Its nearest higher peak is Mount Erebus, 1.0 km (0.62 mi) to the south. The Continental Divide lies 3 km (1.9 mi) to the west, Angle Peak is situated 5.5 km (3.4 mi) to the southeast, and The Ramparts are 4.0 km (2.5 mi) to the north. The mountain's descriptive name was applied in 1921 by the Interprovincial Boundary Survey in keeping with the castle theme of the Ramparts area. The mountain's name was officially adopted in 1935 when approved by the Geographical Names Board of Canada.

== Climate ==
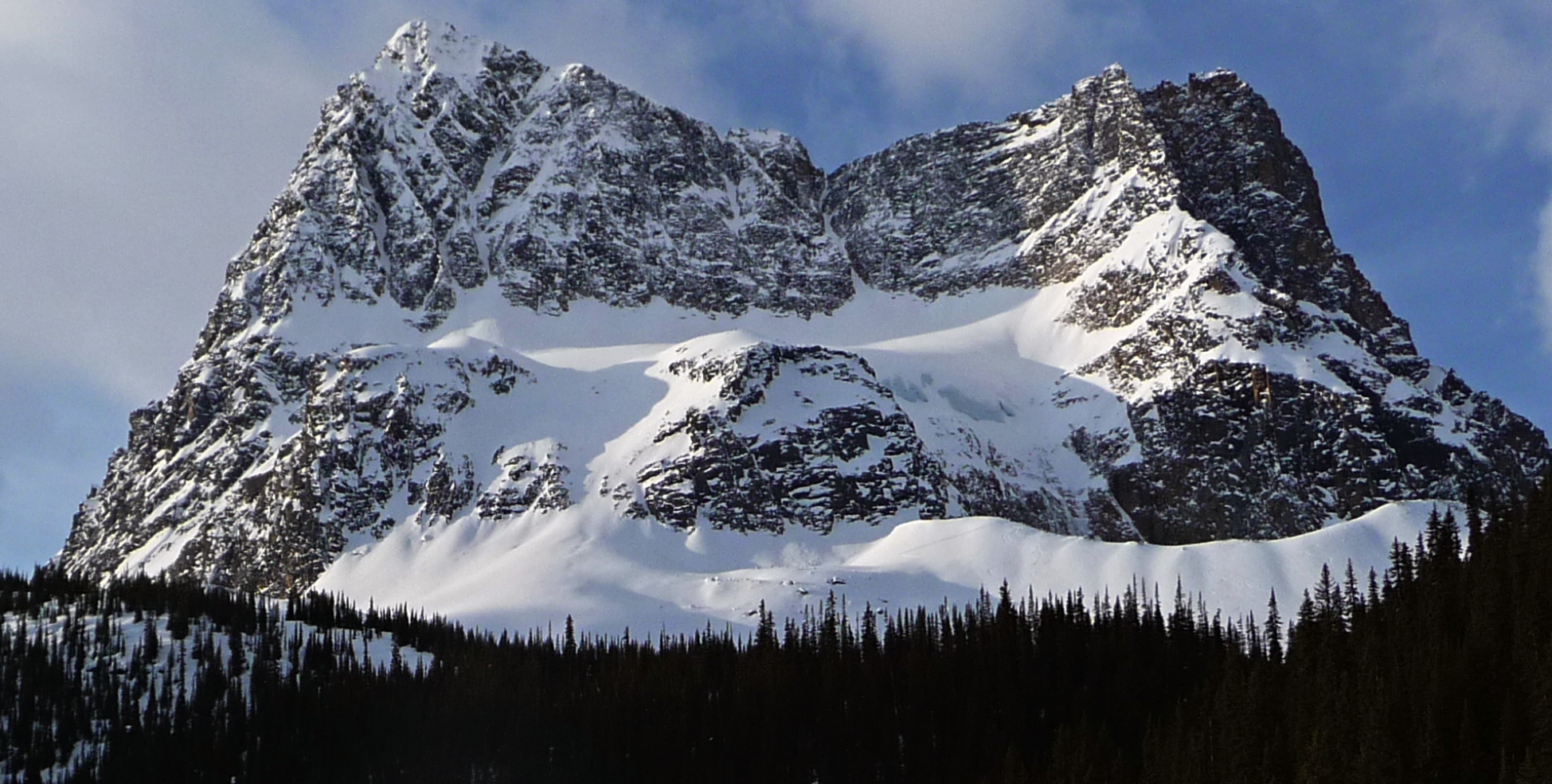
Outpost Peak in winter

Based on the Köppen climate classification, Outpost Peak is located in a subarctic climate zone with cold, snowy winters, and mild summers. Temperatures can drop below −20 °C (−4 °F) with wind chill factors below −30 °C (−22 °F). This climate supports a small glacier on the north slope, the Eremite Glacier on the south aspect, and the Fraser Glacier to the west. In terms of favorable weather, July and August present the best months for climbing. Precipitation runoff from Outpost Peak drains into the Astoria River, a tributary of the Athabasca River.

== See also ==
- List of mountains in the Canadian Rockies
- Geology of the Rocky Mountains
