= Mount Erebus (Canada) =

Mountain in the country of Canada

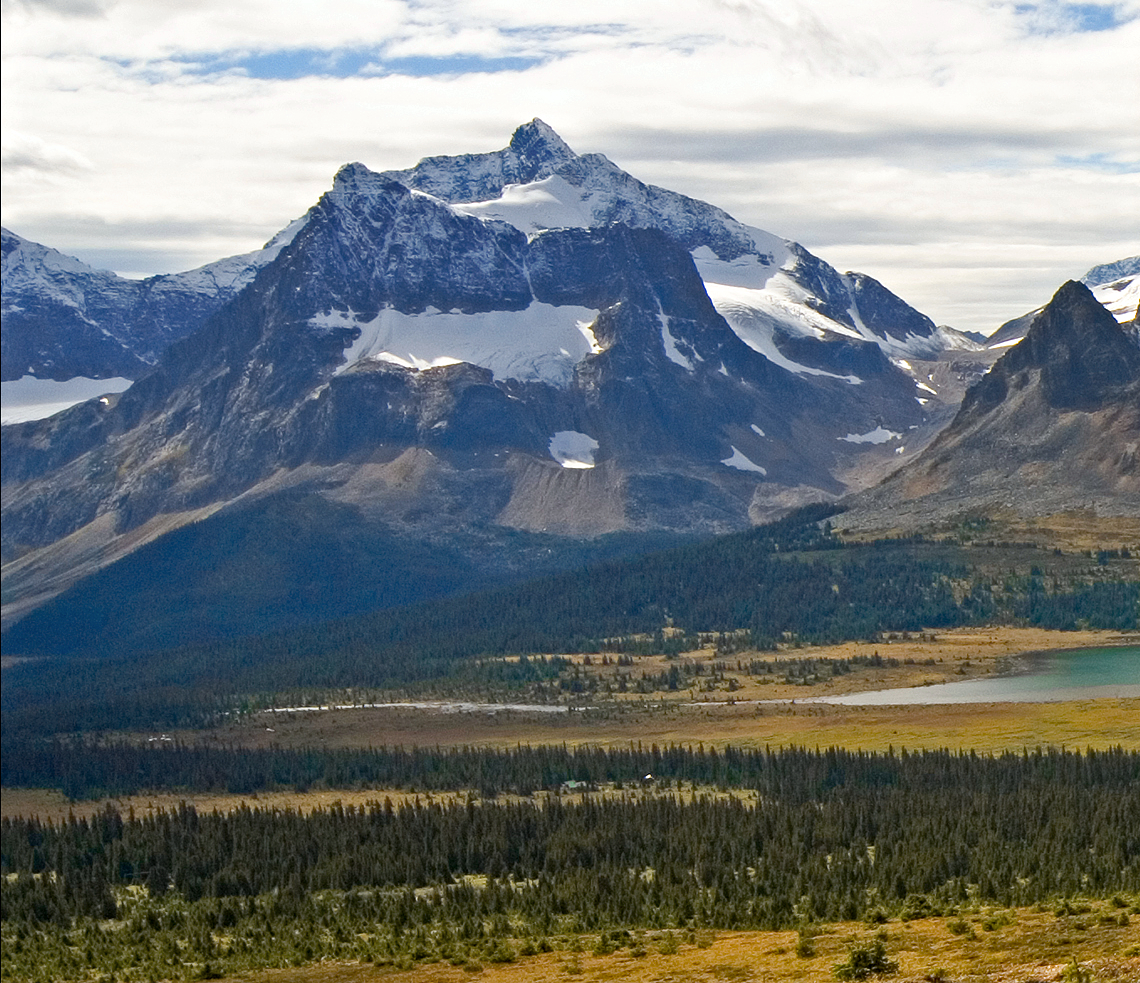
- Mount Erebus behind outlier Outpost Peak

Highest point
- Elevation: 3,112 m (10,210 ft)
- Prominence: 722 m (2,369 ft)
- Parent peak: Mount Fraser (3313 m)
- Listing: Mountains of Alberta
- Coordinates: 52°37′58″N 118°16′02″W

Geography
- Location within Alberta Location within Canada
- Location: Jasper National Park; Alberta, Canada
- Parent range: Park Ranges; Canadian Rockies
- Topo map: NTS 83D9 Amethyst Lakes

Geology
- Rock age: Cambrian
- Rock type: Sedimentary rock

Climbing
- First ascent: 1924 by L. Coolidge, G. Higginsnon, J.E. Johnson, A. Streich

Mount Erebus is a 3,112-metre (10,210-foot) mountain summit located near the Tonquin Valley of Jasper National Park in Alberta, Canada. Mount Erebus is composed of sedimentary rock laid down during the Cambrian period, then was pushed east and over the top of younger rock during the Laramide orogeny. Its nearest higher peak is Mount Fraser, 4.0 km (2.5 mi) to the northwest. The Continental Divide lies 3 km (1.9 mi) to the west, Angle Peak is situated 4.5 km (2.8 mi) to the southeast, and The Ramparts are 5.0 km (3.1 mi) to the north. The mountain's north ridge terminates at Outpost Peak.

== History ==
The mountain's name was applied in 1916 by Morrison P. Bridgland (1878–1948), a Dominion Land Surveyor who named many peaks in Jasper Park and the Canadian Rockies. Bridgland was impressed with the dark colored cliffs of the northeast face of the mountain. The Greek word for darkness is erebus. Bridgland would have also known about HMS Erebus and Franklin's lost expedition. The mountain is located at the west margin of the Tonquin Valley, which is also named for another ill-fated ship, Tonquin.

The first ascent of the mountain was made in 1924 by L. Coolidge (the son of Harold Jefferson Coolidge Sr.), G. Higginsnon, J. E. Johnson, and guide A. Streich.

The mountain's name was officially adopted in 1935 when approved by the Geographical Names Board of Canada.

== Climate ==
Based on the Köppen climate classification, Mount Erebus is located in a subarctic climate zone with cold, snowy winters, and mild summers. Temperatures can drop below −20 °C (−4 °F) with wind chill factors below −30 °C (−22 °F). This climate supports the Fraser Glacier on the northwest slope, and the Eremite Glacier on the northeast slope. In terms of favorable weather, July and August present the best months for climbing. Precipitation runoff from Mount Erebus drains into the Astoria River and Whirlpool River, both tributaries of the Athabasca River.
