= Majestic Mountain (Alberta) =

Mountain in Jasper National Park, Alberta, Canada

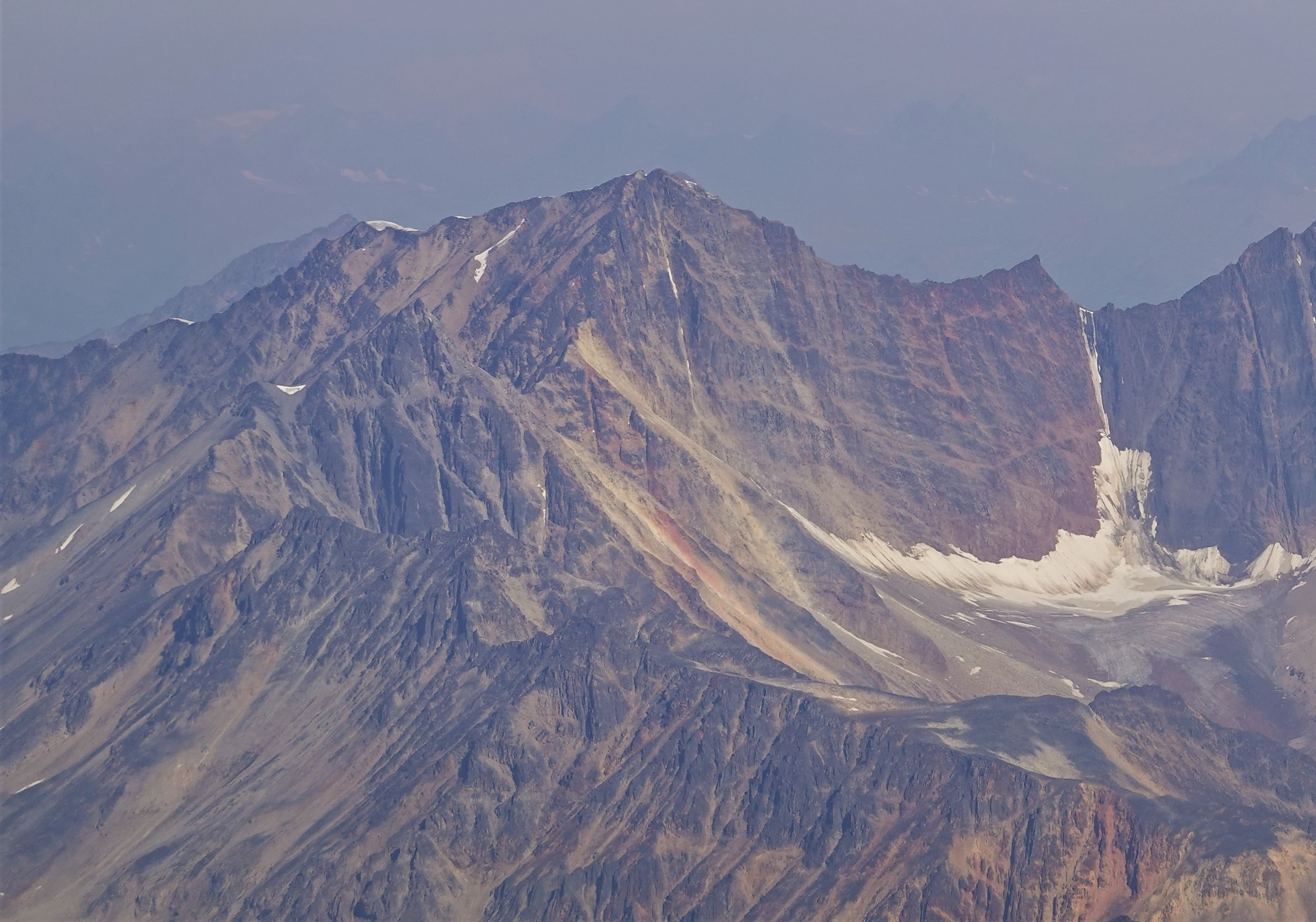
- Southeast aspect, from Mt. Edith Cavell

Highest point
- Elevation: 3,086 m (10,125 ft)
- Prominence: 1,120 m (3,675 ft)
- Parent peak: Redoubt Peak (3,115 m)
- Isolation: 9.45 km (5.87 mi)
- Listing: Mountains of Alberta
- Coordinates: 52°45′27″N 118°12′56″W

Geography
- Location within Alberta Location within Canada
- Interactive map of Majestic Mountain
- Country: Canada
- Province: Alberta
- Protected area: Jasper National Park
- Parent range: Canadian Rockies; Trident Range
- Topo map: NTS 83D16 Jasper

Geology
- Rock age: Cambrian
- Rock type: Sedimentary rock

Climbing
- First ascent: 1926

Majestic Mountain is a 3,086-metre (10,125-foot) summit in Alberta, Canada.

== Description ==
Majestic Mountain is located within Jasper National Park and is the highest point of the Trident Range in the Canadian Rockies. The town of Jasper is situated 17 km (11 mi) to the northeast and the Continental Divide is 11 km (6.8 mi) to the west. The nearest higher neighbor is Redoubt Peak, 9 km (5.6 mi) to the southwest. Precipitation runoff from Majestic Mountain's east slope drains to the Athabasca River via Portal Creek and the west slope drains to the Miette River via Meadow Creek. Topographic relief is significant as the summit rises 1,100 m (3,600 ft) above Circus Valley in 2.5 km (1.6 mi).

== History ==
The first ascent of the summit was made in 1915 by Morrison P. Bridgland. The mountain's name was also applied in 1916 by Morrison P. Bridgland, a Dominion Land Surveyor who named many peaks in this area and was impressed by this one. The "Mt. Majestic" name appeared in the publication of a climbing guide book in 1921, which identified the peak as the highest in the Trident group. The mountain's toponym was officially adopted in 1951 by the Geographical Names Board of Canada.

== Geology ==
The mountain is composed of sedimentary rock laid down during the Precambrian to Jurassic periods and pushed east and over the top of younger rock during the Laramide orogeny.

== Climate ==
Based on the Köppen climate classification, Majestic Mountain is located in a subarctic climate zone with cold, snowy winters, and mild summers. Winter temperatures can drop below −20 °C (−4 °F) with wind chill factors below −30 °C (−22 °F).

== Gallery ==
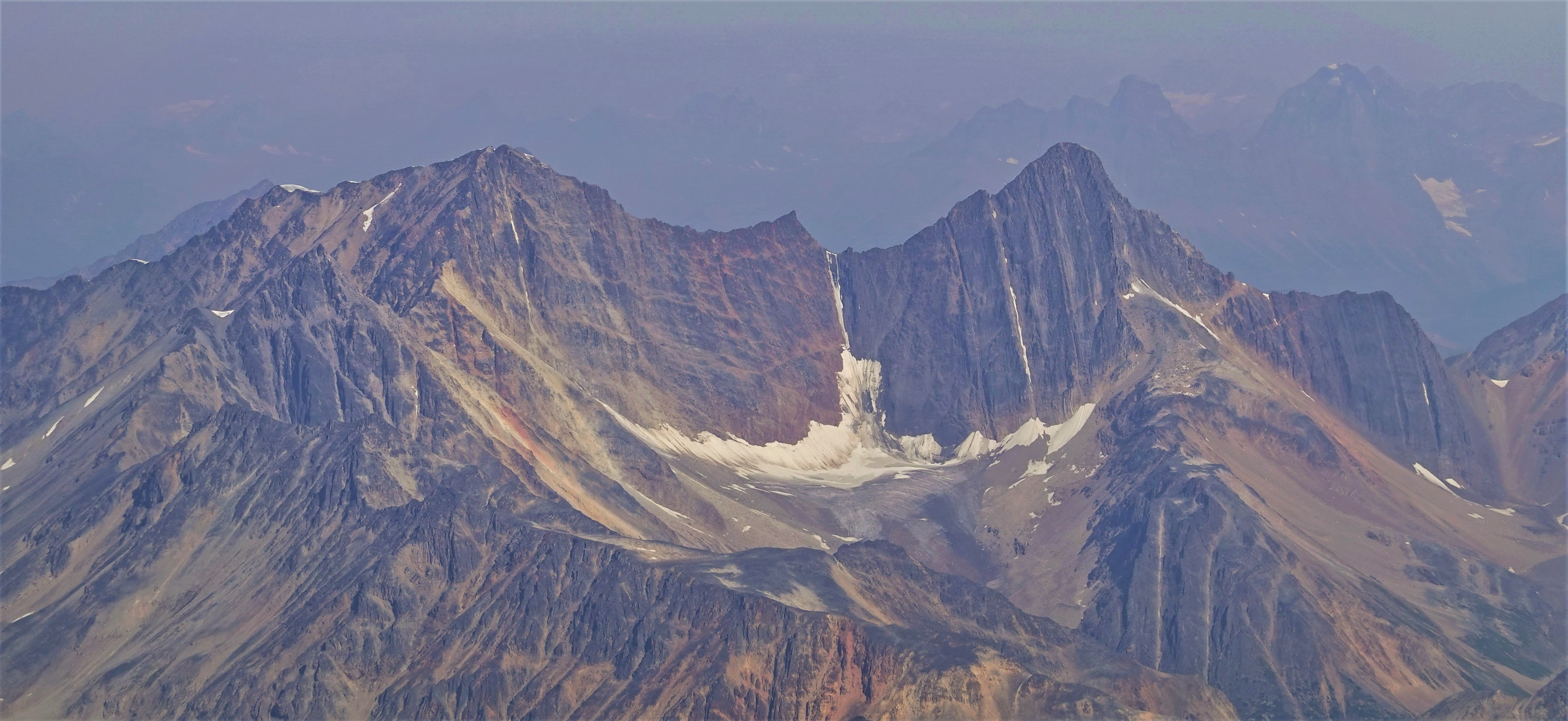
Majestic Mountain (left) and Mount Estella (right)

== See also ==
- List of mountains in the Canadian Rockies
- Geography of Alberta
