= Angle Peak =

Angle Peak may refer to:

- Angle Peak (Alberta), a mountain in Canada
- Angle Peak (Antarctica), a mountain in Palmer Land, Antarctica
