= Oubliette Mountain =

Mountain summit in British Columbia, Canada

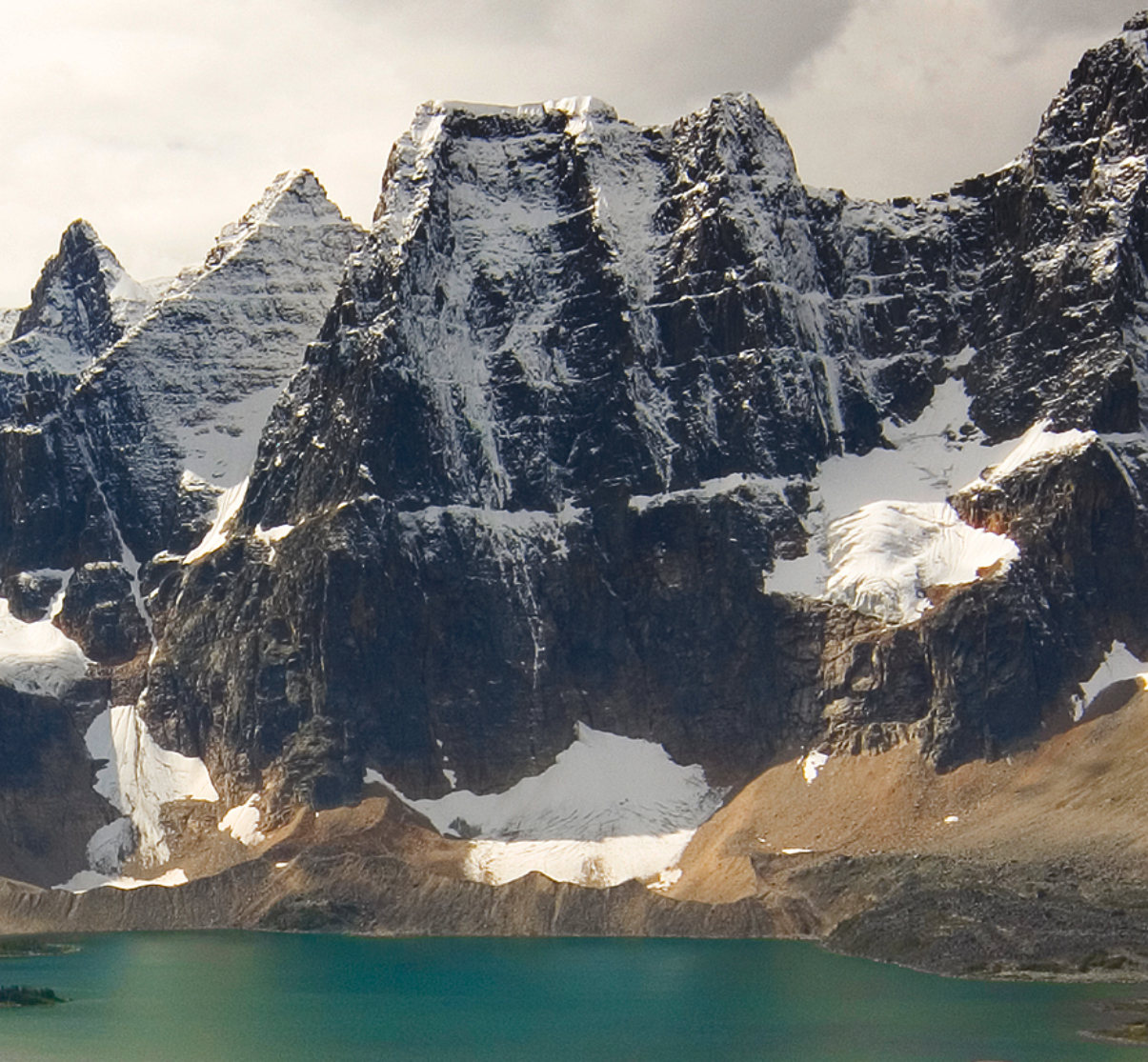
- Oubliette Mountain above Amethyst Lakes

Highest point
- Elevation: 3,070 m (10,070 ft)
- Prominence: 160 m (520 ft)
- Parent peak: Dungeon Peak (3129 m)
- Listing: Mountains of Alberta; Mountains of British Columbia
- Coordinates: 52°40′40″N 118°17′15″W

Geography
- Location within Alberta Location within British Columbia Location within Canada
- Interactive map of Oubliette Mountain
- Country: Canada
- Provinces: Alberta and British Columbia
- Protected areas: Jasper National Park; Mount Robson Provincial Park
- Parent range: Park Ranges; Canadian Rockies
- Topo map: NTS 83D9 Amethyst Lakes

Geology
- Rock age: Cambrian
- Rock type: Quartzite

Climbing
- First ascent: 1932 W.R. Hainsworth, M.M. Strumia, Hans Fuhrer

Oubliette Mountain is a 3,070-metre (10,072 ft) mountain summit located on the shared border of Jasper National Park in Alberta, and Mount Robson Provincial Park in British Columbia, Canada. Situated in the Tonquin Valley, Oubliette Mountain is part of The Ramparts in the Canadian Rockies. The nearest higher neighbor is Dungeon Peak, 1.0 km (0.62 mi) to the northwest. Not coincidentally, an oubliette is a secret dungeon with access only through a trapdoor in its ceiling. The mountain's descriptive name was coined by Cyril G. Wates.

== History ==
The first ascent was made in July 1932 by William Hainsworth and Max Strumia, with guide Hans Fuhrer.

The first ascent of the East Buttress was made July 27, 1962 by Fred Beckey, Brian Greenwood, and Don Gordon. This climbing route is included in Beckey's book titled "Fred Beckey's 100 Favorite North American Climbs".

== Climate ==
Based on the Köppen climate classification, Oubliette Mountain is located in a subarctic climate zone with cold, snowy winters, and mild summers. Winter temperatures can drop below -20 °C with wind chill factors below -30 °C. In terms of favorable weather, July and August present the best months for climbing. However, these months coincide with mosquito season, which requires effective defenses. Precipitation runoff from Oubliette Mountain drains into tributaries of the Athabasca River on its east side, and the headwaters of the Fraser River from the west side.

== Geology ==
Oubliette Mountain is composed of quartzite laid down during the Cambrian period. This rock was pushed east and over the top of younger rock during the Laramide orogeny.

== See also ==
- List of peaks on the British Columbia–Alberta border

== Gallery ==
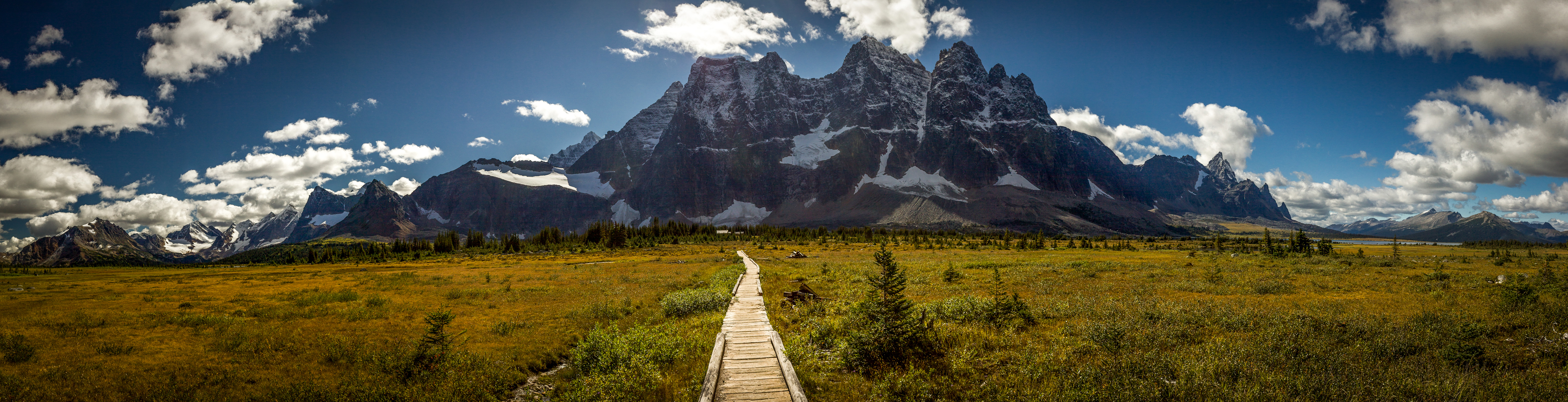
The Ramparts in Tonquin Valley with trail pointed at Oubliette Mountain

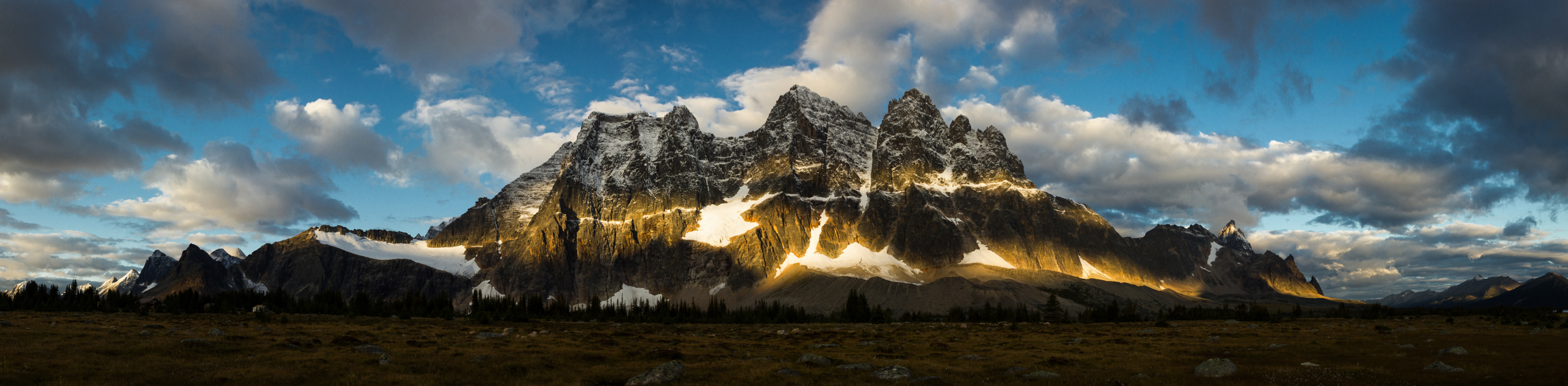
Sunrise and cloud shadows on the Tonquin Valley Ramparts. Oubliette (left), Dungeon Peak (middle), Redoubt Peak (right)
