= Joseph E. Johnson (government official) =

American government official

- Born: 30 April 1906; Longdale, Virginia
- Died: 24 October 1990 (aged 84); Lynchburg, Virginia
- Education: Harvard University
- Occupation: US State Department official
- Known for: President of the Carnegie Endowment for International Peace

Joseph Esrey Johnson III (April 30, 1906 – 1990) was an American government official who served with both the United States Department of State and the United Nations. He was a grandson of another Joseph Esrey Johnson, an officer in the Union Army and Virginian industrialist.

== Early life and education ==
Joseph E. Johnson III was born in Longdale, Virginia to mining and metallurgical engineer Joseph E. Johnson Jr. (himself a son of a director of the Longdale Iron Co.) who managed various iron and steel plants before turning to consultancy work in New York, and Margaret Hill (Hilles) Johnson, alumna of Bryn Mawr College, who married his father in 1902. He had an older brother with the same name who died in infancy in 1903, and his father was fatally run over by a car 48 years old in 1919.

He grew up in Scarsdale, New York. At Harvard University, he earned his bachelor's, master's and doctoral degrees.

Johnson joined the American Alpine Club in 1925, his climbing companions included Henry S. Hall Jr. and Sir Douglas Busk. He was a serious and devoted mountaineer climbing both in the Alps and the Canadian Rockies and his ascents include the first traverse of Mount Edith Cavell, the first ascents of Oldhorn, Erebus, Keystone and Casemate, but he gave up serious climbing after a long illness in the late 1920s.

== University career and US State Department ==
His first teaching position was at Bowdoin College where he was professor of history (1934–1935). In 1936 he moved to Williams College, becoming associate professor in 1938 and full professor from 1947 to 1950, after the period he spent in the US State Department.

He took leave in 1942 to join the wartime State Department. He became chief of the department's Division of International Security Affairs 1945–1947, having served as acting chief from 1944.

At the State Department, he was adviser for the U.S. delegation at the Dumbarton Oaks Conference (1944), which paved the way for postwar international cooperation, the creation of the United Nations and decided the basic structure of the UN. In 1945 he was adviser for the U.S. delegation at the Mexico City Inter-American Conference on Problems of War and Peace. He was a member of the U.S. delegation for the San Francisco United Nations Conference on International Organization in 1945, at which the United Nations effectively came into being. In the following years he was adviser to the U.S. delegation at the First session of the United Nations General Assembly (London and New York, 1946) and also adviser to the U.S. representative on the United Nations Security Council (London and New York, 1946).

== Career with the Carnegie Endowment for International Peace ==
From 1950 to 1971 he was President of the Carnegie Endowment for International Peace and was a strong believer in making efforts towards international cooperation. He was a member of the board of trustees of the World Peace Foundation in the early 1950s.

During 1952–53 he was one of five members of the State Department Panel of Consultants on Disarmament and played a significant role in the panel's stark report about the dangers of nuclear weapons and relations with the Soviet Union.

From 1954, he was inaugural American secretary of the annual Bilderberg conference, which discusses matters relating to European-American relations.

He was special representative for the United Nations Conciliation Commission for Palestine (August 1961-February 1963) and in that role he presented a plan to address the Palestinian refugee crisis.

In 1969, he served as an alternate delegate on the US delegation to the United Nations, working under Ambassador Charles W. Yost.

Johnson was vice president of the International Institute for Strategic Studies from 1965 to 1981.
