= Postern Mountain =

Peak in British Columbia

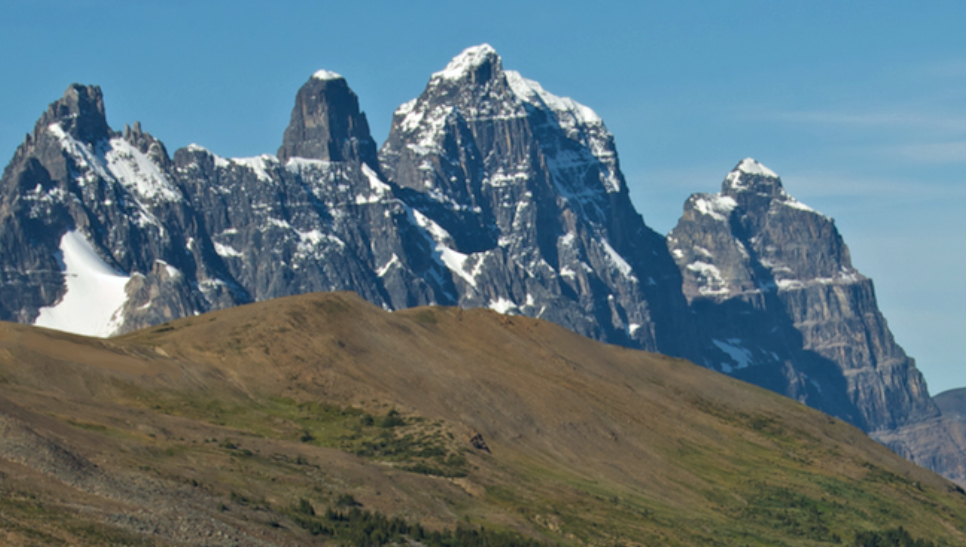
- Photo of the Ramparts taken in 2011

Highest point
- Elevation: 2,944 m (9,659 ft)
- Prominence: 324 m (1,063 ft)
- Parent peak: Casemate Mountain (3103 m)
- Listing: Mountains of British Columbia
- Coordinates: 52°41′16″N 118°21′45″W

Geography
- Location within British Columbia
- Country: Canada
- Province: British Columbia
- District: Cariboo Land District
- Protected area: Mount Robson Provincial Park
- Parent range: the Ramparts
- Topo map: NTS 83D9 Amethyst Lakes

Climbing
- First ascent: 1927 by Rex Gibson and E. Niederer

Postern Mountain is a 2,944-metre (9,659 ft) mountain located on the SE side of Mount Robson Provincial Park in the Canadian Rockies, British Columbia, Canada. It is a part of the Ramparts range and is adjacent to Geikie Creek, a small stream connected to the Fraser River. It is notable for its steep cliff faces and abundance of quartzite, unusual for the majority-limestone mountains that surround it. These factors make it, along with the rest of the Ramparts, an attractive destination for mountain climbers.
