= Longdale, Virginia =

Unincorporated community in Virginia, United States

Coordinates: 37.833461°N 79.7756039°W

Longdale is an unincorporated community in Alleghany County, Virginia, United States.

It is placed near the North Mountain Subdivision of the Chesapeake and Ohio Railway. In the 19th century a station existed with the same name, and a road called Longdale Station (Virginia State Route 639) still runs through the hamlet.

The community is not to be confused with the larger Longdale Furnace to the east.
