= Joseph E. Johnson (soldier) =

American soldier and recipient of the Medal of Honor

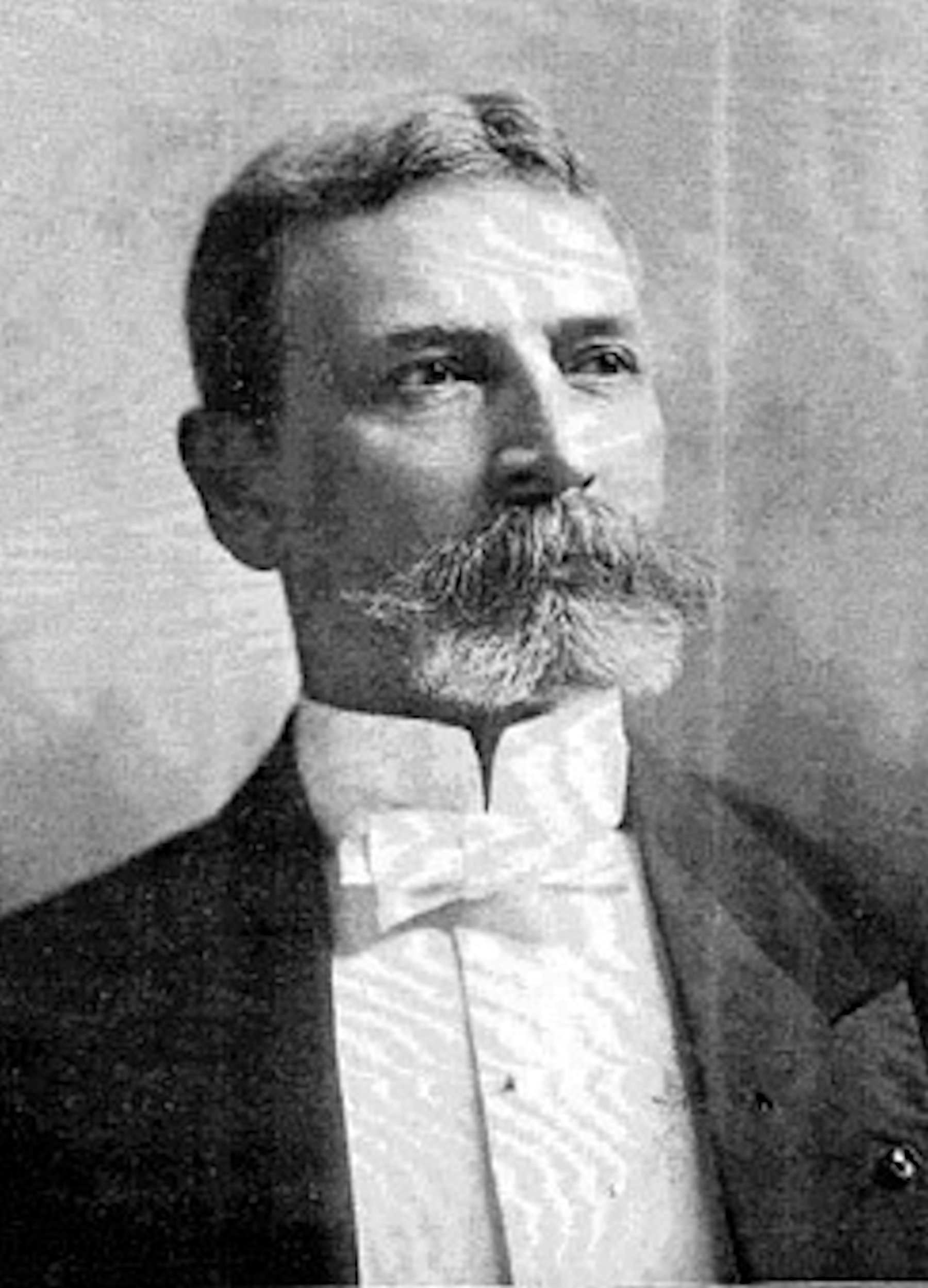
Joseph Esrey Johnson c1898. This photograph is in the public domain.

Joseph Esrey Johnson (February 5, 1843 – April 30, 1911) was an American soldier and recipient of the Medal of Honor who earned the award for his actions in the American Civil War. He later worked as a manager and director in an iron company in Virginia. He is grandfather of Joseph Esrey Johnson III, a notable American diplomat.

== Biography ==
Johnson was born in Lower Merion, Pennsylvania on February 5, 1843. He served as a first lieutenant with Company A of the 58th Pennsylvania Infantry. He earned his medal in action at Fort Harrison, Virginia on September 29, 1864. By the end of the war, Johnson had reached the rank of brevet major.

In the early 1870s he joined William Firmstone as superintendent in the Longdale Iron Company, and they converted blast furnace iron production from charcoal to coke. He moved to the board of directors in 1900 and retired in 1909. His son Joseph Esrey Johnson Jr. worked as an engineer in the same industry, and his grandson Joseph Esrey Johnson III became a successful US diplomat.

His medal was issued on April 1, 1898. Johnson died on April 30, 1911, and is now buried in Arlington National Cemetery, Virginia.

== Medal of Honor citation ==
For extraordinary heroism on 29 September 1864, in action at Fort Harrison, Virginia. Though twice severely wounded while advancing in the assault, First Lieutenant Johnson disregarded his injuries and was among the first to enter the fort, where he was wounded for the third time.
