= Dorsa Geikie =

Wrinkle ridge on the Moon

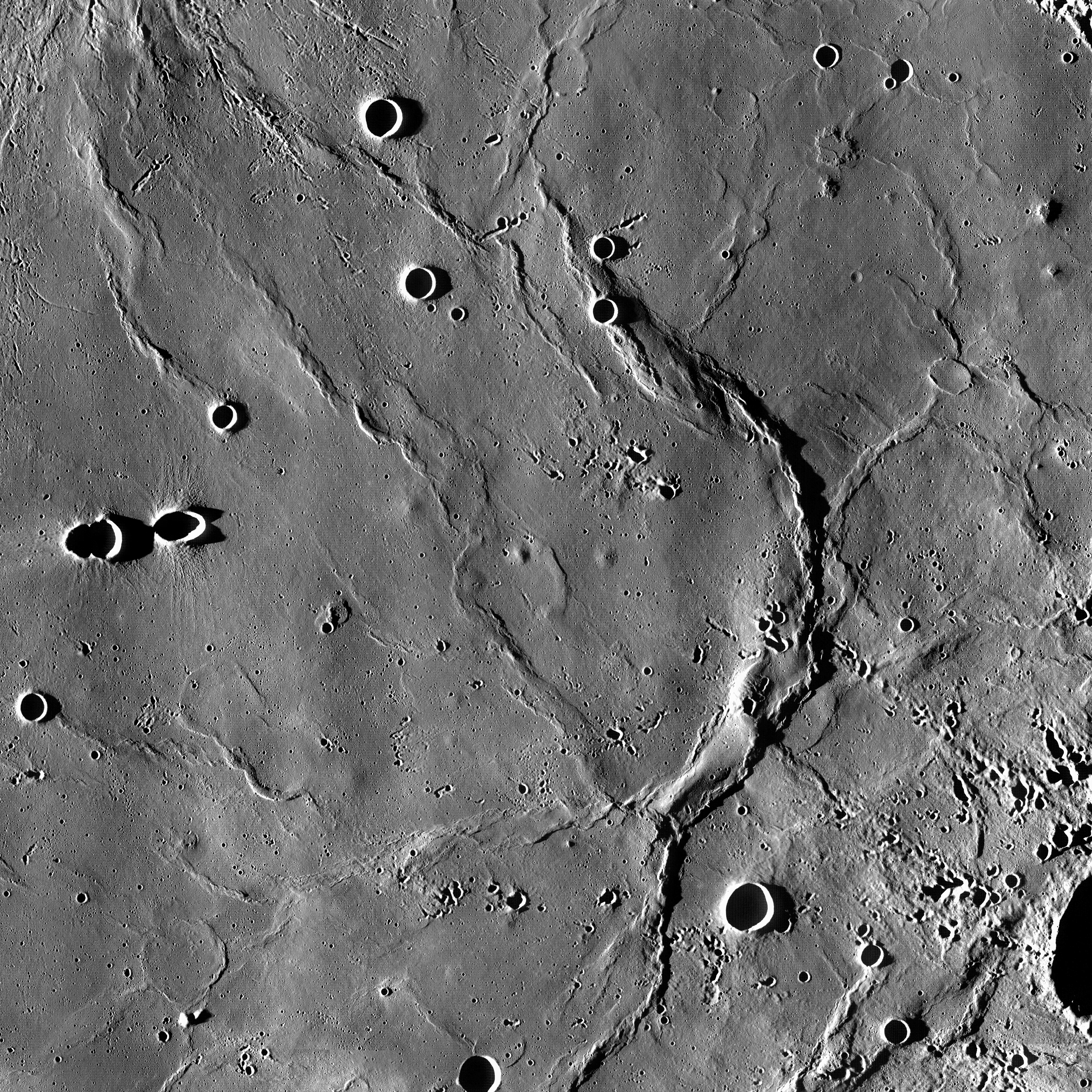
Dorsa Geikie is the curved ridge at center. LRO mosaic.

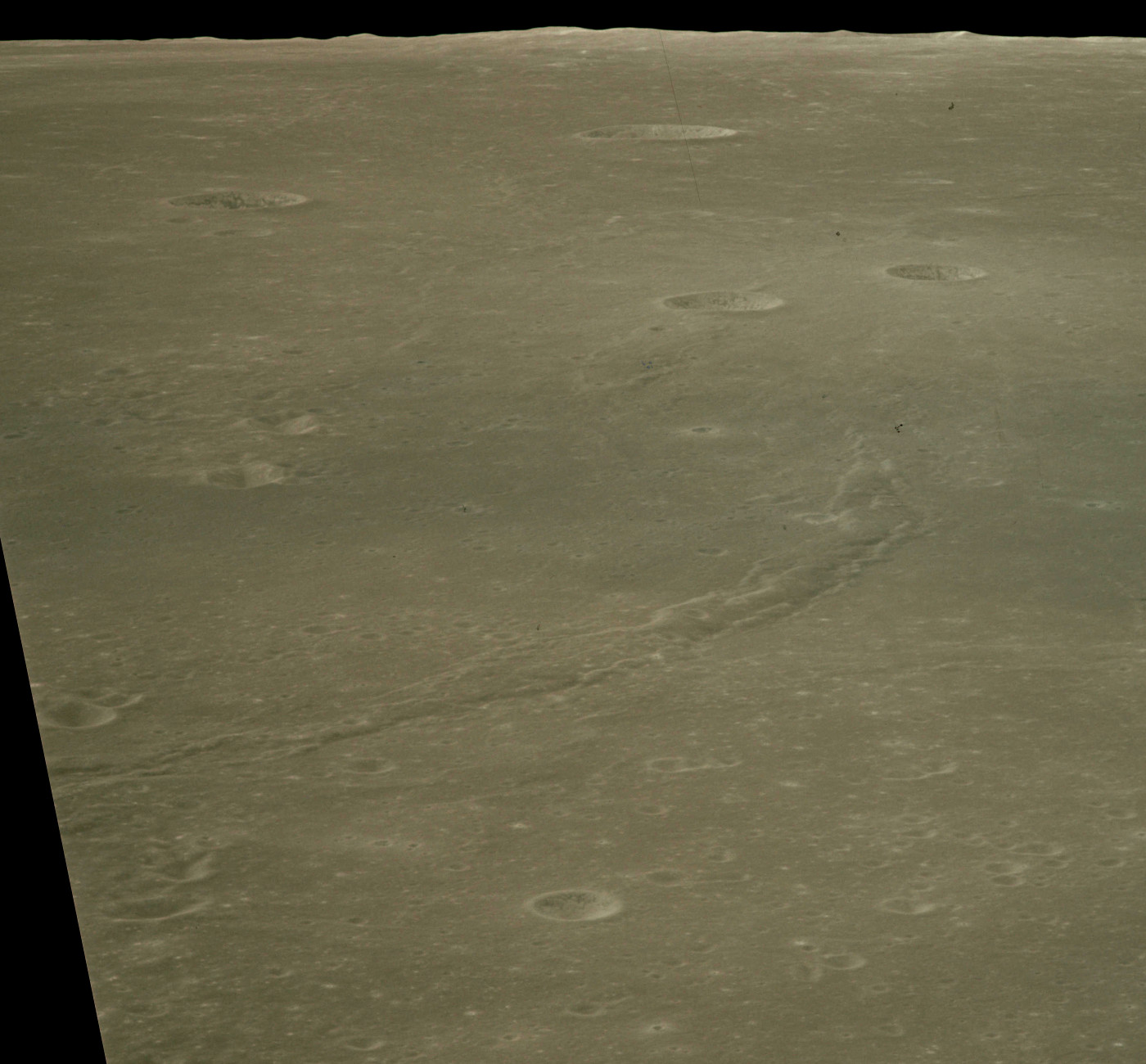
Oblique view of the northern portion of the Dorsa, from Apollo 15

Dorsa Geikie is a wrinkle ridge in Mare Fecunditatis on the Moon, at 4.6°S 52.5°E.

It is approximately 220 km long and was named after Scottish geologist Sir Archibald Geikie in 1976 by the IAU.
