= Geikie, Alberta =

Coordinates: 52.86671°N 118.26909°W

Location of Geikie, Alberta

Geikie is a locality in Alberta, Canada.

The locality takes its name from Mount Geikie.
