= James Stuart Geikie =

Scottish musician

- Born: c. 1812
- Died: 1884; Ormiston

James Stuart (or Stewart) Geikie (1811 – 1883) was a Scottish wig-maker and perfumer remembered as an amateur musician and composer, and as father of two eminent geologists, James and Archibald Geikie. He composed the song "My heather hills", served as choirmaster at St Augustine Church in Edinburgh, and was music critic at The Scotsman for 28 years.

He ran a wig shop and perfumery from 35 North Bridge in Edinburgh's Old Town,
