= Mount Estella =

Mountain in Alberta, Canada

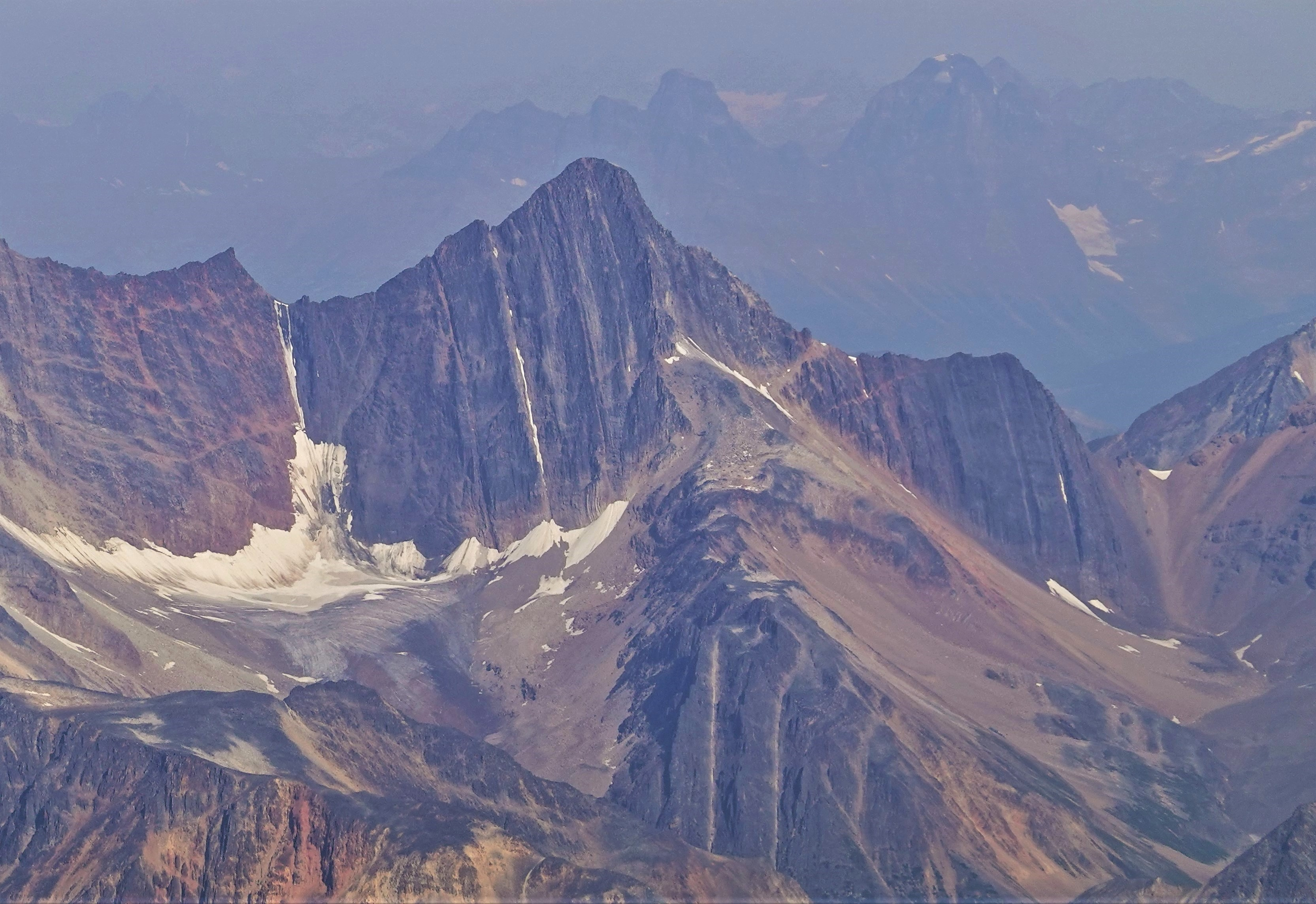
- Southeast aspect, from Mt. Edith Cavell

Highest point
- Elevation: 3,069 m (10,069 ft)
- Prominence: 179 m (587 ft)
- Parent peak: Majestic Mountain (3,086 m)
- Isolation: 1.08 km (0.67 mi)
- Listing: Mountains of Alberta
- Coordinates: 52°46′01″N 118°12′41″W

Geography
- Location within Alberta Location within Canada
- Country: Canada
- Province: Alberta
- Protected area: Jasper National Park
- Parent range: Canadian Rockies; Trident Range
- Topo map: NTS 83D16 Jasper

Geology
- Rock age: Cambrian
- Rock type: Sedimentary rock

Climbing
- First ascent: 1930, N.D. Waffl

Mount Estella is a 3,069-metre (10,069-foot) mountain summit in Alberta, Canada.

== Description ==
Mount Estella is located within Jasper National Park and is the second-highest peak in the Trident Range of the Canadian Rockies. The town of Jasper is situated 16 kilometres (9.9 mi) to the northeast and the Continental Divide is 11 kilometres (6.8 mi) to the west. The nearest higher neighbor is Majestic Mountain, 1.08 km (0.67 mi) to the south. Precipitation runoff from Estella's east slope drains to the Athabasca River via Portal Creek and the west slope drains to the Miette River via Crescent and Meadow creeks. Topographic relief is significant as the summit rises 1,100 m (3,600 ft) above Circus Valley in two kilometres (1.2 mile).

== History ==
The mountain's name first appeared in 1916 when Morrison P. Bridgland, a Dominion Land Surveyor was naming many peaks in this area, but the namesake was not recorded. The name appeared in publications as early as 1917. The mountain's toponym was officially adopted in 1951 by the Geographical Names Board of Canada.

The first ascent of the summit was made in 1930 by Newman Diefendorf Waffl. He would perish later that same year on Mount Robson.

== Geology ==
The mountain is composed of sedimentary rock laid down during the Precambrian to Jurassic periods and pushed east and over the top of younger rock during the Laramide orogeny. The strata of this peak have been tilted from horizontal orientation to nearly vertical.

== Climate ==
Based on the Köppen climate classification, Mt. Estella is located in a subarctic climate zone with cold, snowy winters, and mild summers. Winter temperatures can drop below -20 °C with wind chill factors below -30 °C.

== Gallery ==
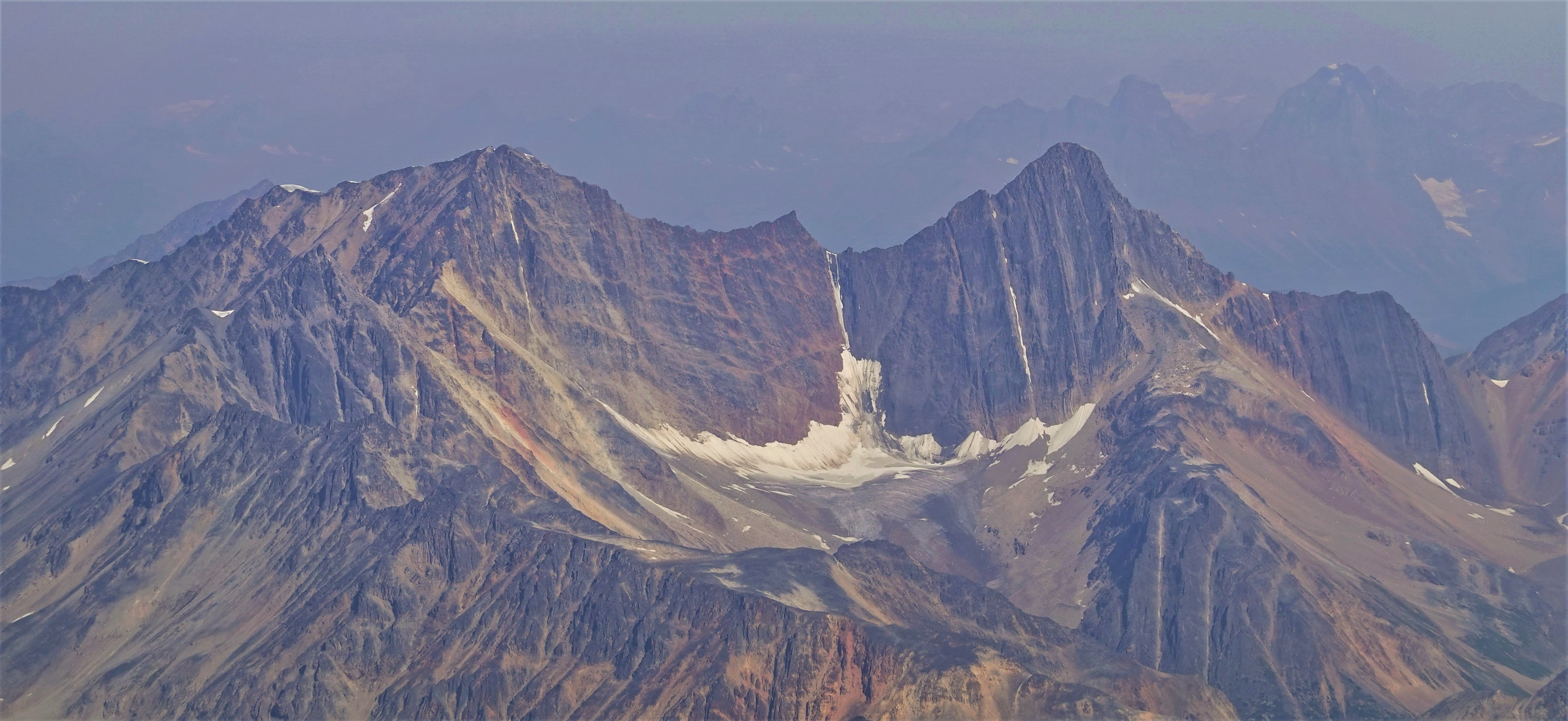
Majestic Mountain (left) and Mount Estella (right)

== See also ==
- List of mountains in the Canadian Rockies
- Geography of Alberta
