= Archibald Geikie =

Scottish geologist and writer

Sir Archibald Geikie OM KCB FRS FRSE
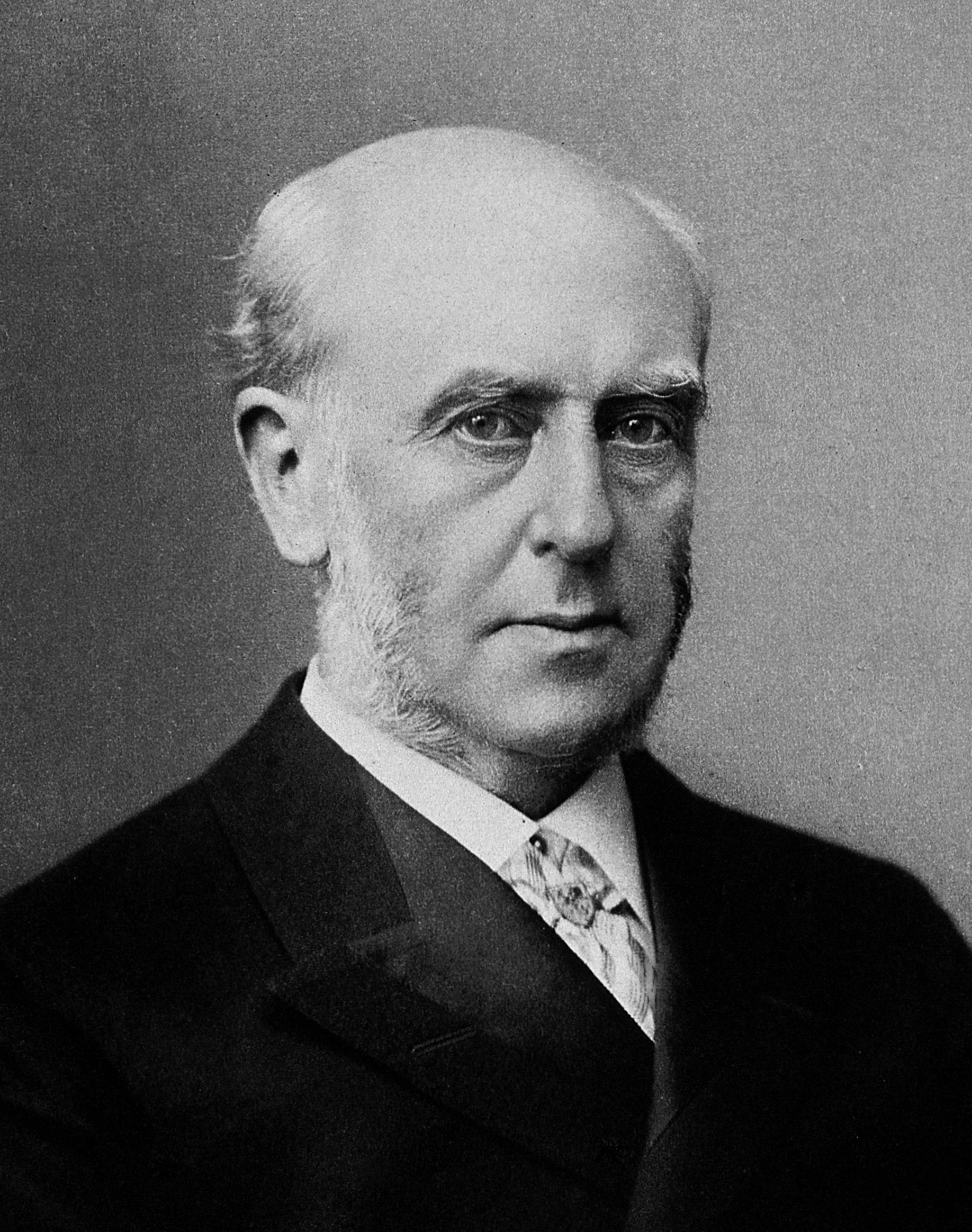
- Sir Archibald Geikie, by Wener & Son.
- Born: 28 December 1835; Edinburgh, Scotland
- Died: 10 November 1924 (aged 88); Haslemere, England
- Awards: Murchison Medal (1881); Wollaston Medal (1895); Royal Medal (1896); Hayden Memorial Geological Award (1902)
- Scientific career
- Fields: Geology

Sir Archibald Geikie OM KCB FRS FRSE (28 December 1835 – 10 November 1924) was a Scottish geologist and writer.

== Early life ==
Geikie was born in Edinburgh in 1835, the eldest son of Isabella Thom and her husband James Stuart Geikie, a musician and music critic. The elder brother of James Geikie, he was educated at Edinburgh High School and University of Edinburgh.

== Career ==
In 1855 Geikie was appointed an assistant with the British Geological Survey. Among his early publications for a popular audience was The Story of a Boulder; or, Gleanings from the Note-Book of a Geologist (1858). His ability at once attracted the notice of his chief, Sir Roderick Murchison, with whom he formed a lifelong friendship, and whose biographer he subsequently became.

Geikie completed some early geological mapping with Murchison on complicated regions of schists in the Scottish Highlands; and they jointly published a new geological map of Scotland in 1862. Geikie completed a larger map in 1892. In 1863 he published an important essay "On the Phenomena of the Glacial Drift of Scotland", in Transactions of the Geological Society of Glasgow, in which the effects of ice action in that country were for the first time clearly and connectedly delineated.

In 1865 Geikie's Scenery of Scotland (3rd edition, 1901) was published, which was, he claimed, the first attempt to elucidate in some detail the history of the topography of a country. In the same year he was elected a Fellow of the Royal Society. At this time the Edinburgh school of geologists, prominent among them Sir Andrew Ramsay, with his Physical Geology and Geography of Great Britain were maintaining the supreme importance of denudation in the configuration of land surfaces, and particularly the erosion of valleys by the action of running water. Geikie's book, based on extensive personal knowledge of the country, was an able contribution to the doctrines of the Edinburgh school, of which he himself soon began to rank as one of the leaders. In 1880, he was elected as a member of the American Philosophical Society.

== Geological Survey ==
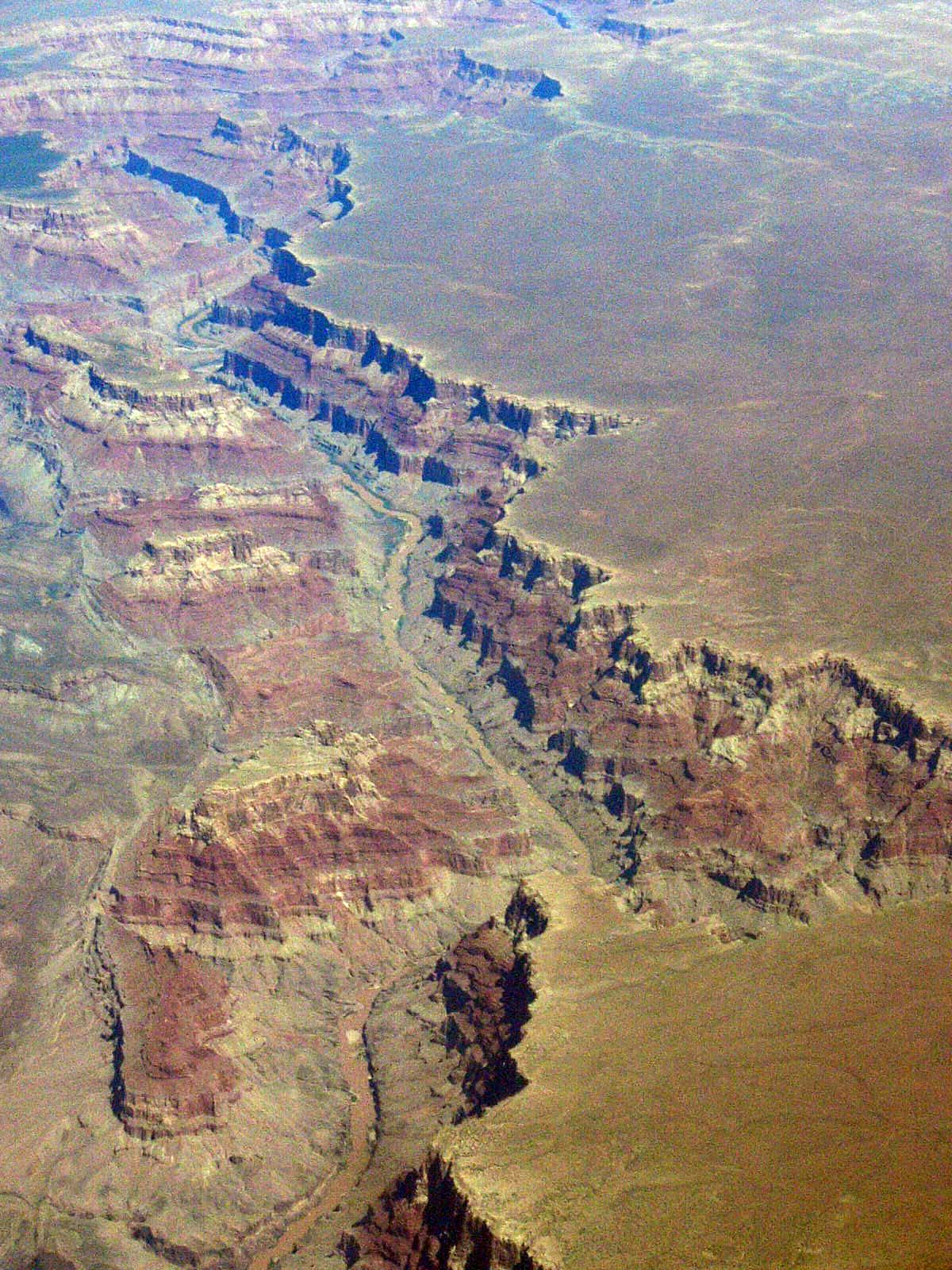
The Grand Canyon, Arizona, at the confluence of the Colorado and Little Colorado rivers

In 1867, when a separate branch of the Geological Survey was established for Scotland, he was appointed director. On the foundation of the Murchison professorship of geology and mineralogy at the University of Edinburgh in 1871, he became the first occupant of the chair. He continued to hold these two appointments until 1881. In that year, he was awarded the Murchison Medal of the Geological Society of London and he succeeded Sir Andrew Ramsay in the joint offices of Director-General of the Geological Survey of the United Kingdom and Director of the Museum of Practical Geology, London, from which he retired in February 1901. A feature of his tenure of office was the impetus given to microscopic petrography, a branch of geology to which he had devoted special study, by a splendid collection of thin sections of British rocks. Later he wrote two Survey Memoirs, The Geology of Central and Western Fife and Kinross (1900), and The Geology of Eastern Fife (1902).

From the outset of his career, when he started to investigate the geology of Skye and other of the Western Isles, he took a keen interest in volcanic geology, and in 1871 he brought before the Geological Society of London an outline of the Tertiary volcanic history of Britain. Many difficult problems, however, remained to be solved. Here he was greatly aided by his extensive travels not only throughout Europe, but in western America. While the canyons of the Colorado River confirmed his long-standing views on erosion, the volcanic regions of Wyoming, Montana and Utah supplied him with valuable data in explanation of volcanic phenomena. The results of his further research were given in an essay entitled "The History of Volcanic Action during the Tertiary Period in the British Isles," in Transactions of the Royal Society of Edinburgh (1888). His views on volcanic geology were delivered in his presidential addresses to the Geological Society of London in 1891 and 1892 and afterward embodied in his book The Ancient Volcanoes of Great Britain (1897). Other results of his travels are collected in Geological Sketches at Home and Abroad (1882).

== Writings ==
Geikie wrote a biography of Edward Forbes (with G Wilson), and biographies of his predecessors Sir Roderick Impey Murchison (two volumes, 1875) and Sir Andrew Crombie Ramsay (1895). His book Founders of Geology consists of the inaugural course of lectures (founded by Mrs George Huntington Williams) at Johns Hopkins University, Baltimore, delivered in 1897.

In 1897 he issued a Geological Map of England and Wales, with Descriptive Notes. In 1898 he delivered the Romanes Lectures, which was published under the title of Types of Scenery and their Influence on Literature. The study of physical geography in Great Britain improved largely due to his efforts. Among his works on this subject is The Teaching of Geography (1887). His other books include Scottish Reminiscences (1904) and Landscape in History and other Essays (1905). His Birds of Shakespeare was published in 1916.

He was the editor of The Geological Structure of the North-West Highlands of Scotland (1907, His Majesty's Stationery Office), written by B. N. Peach, John Horne, William Gunn (1837–1902), C. T. Clough, L. W. Hinxman, and J. H. H. Teall.

== Honours and awards ==
Geikie was elected Fellow of the Royal Society in 1865. Geikie was Foreign Secretary of the Royal Society from 1890 to 1894, Joint Secretary from 1903 to 1908 and elected president in 1909 and awarded their Royal Medal in 1896. He was President of the Geological Society of London in 1891 and 1892, and again in 1906 and 1907. He was also President of the British Association in 1892.

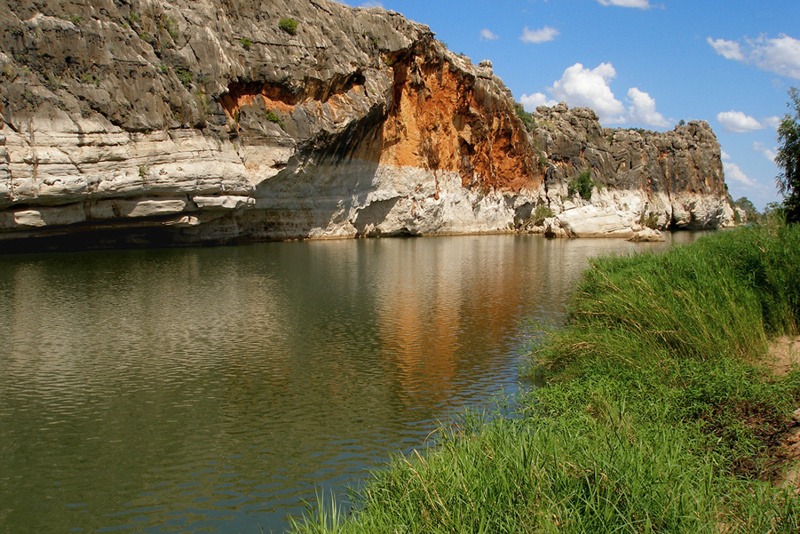
Geikie Gorge National Park, Fitzroy River, 2007

He received the honorary Doctor of Laws (LL.D) from the University of Glasgow in June 1901.

He received a knighthood in 1891, the Knight Commander of the Most Honourable Order of the Bath in 1907 and the Order of Merit in 1914. In 1905 he received the RSGS Livingstone Medal.

Dorsa Geikie, a wrinkle ridge system on the Moon, and the mineral geikielite, a magnesium-titanium oxide, are both named after him, as is Geikie Gorge in the Napier Range in the Kimberley region of Western Australia, Mount Geikie in the Canadian Rockies, Mount Geikie in Wyoming, Geikie Peak in the Grand Canyon, and the Geikie Slide in the Atlantic Ocean northwest of Scotland.

== Death ==
He died at his home, "Shepherd's Down" in Haslemere, Surrey and is buried there in the village churchyard.

== Family ==
In 1871, Geikie married Alice Gabrielle Anne Marie Pignatel, daughter of Eugene Pignatel of Lyons. They had a son Roderick (killed in early life) and three daughters, Lucie, Elsie and Gabrielle.

== The Sir Archibald Geikie Archive ==
The Geikie Archive at Haslemere Educational Museum, in Surrey, consists of letter books, artwork, field notebooks, geological specimens, letters, personal items, manuscripts and photographs. Part of the archive is displayed in its own room at the museum.

Geikie, who moved to Haslemere in 1901, was a patient of Museum founder Sir Jonathan Hutchinson. After Hutchinson's death, Geikie set up a board of trustees to run the museum, of which he became the first chairman.

== Gallery ==
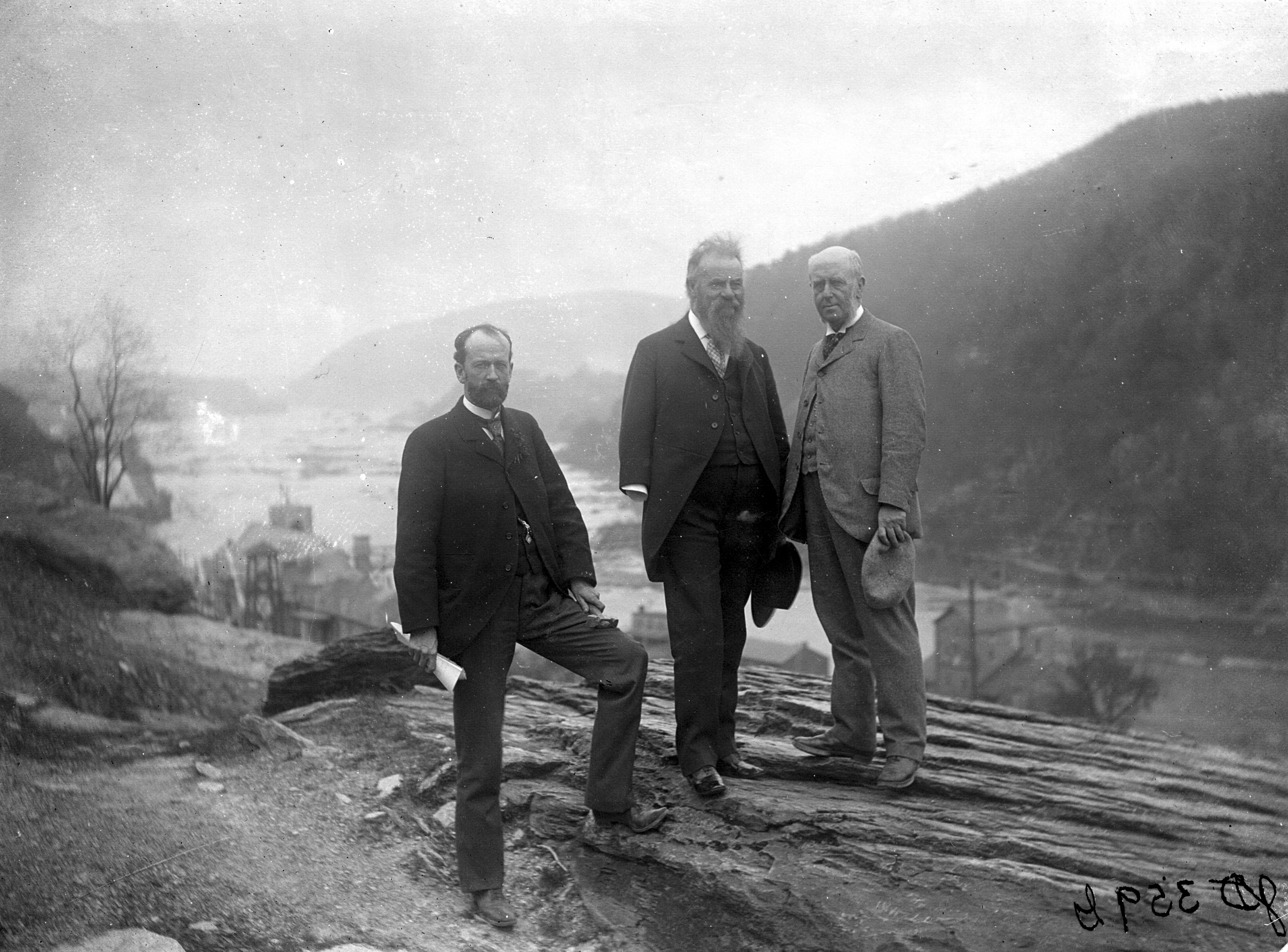
Charles Doolittle Walcott, John Wesley Powell, and Sir Archibald Geikie on a geological field excursion to Harpers Ferry, West Virginia, May 1897, following the George Huntington Williams Memorial Lectures delivered by Sir Archibald Geikie at Johns Hopkins University

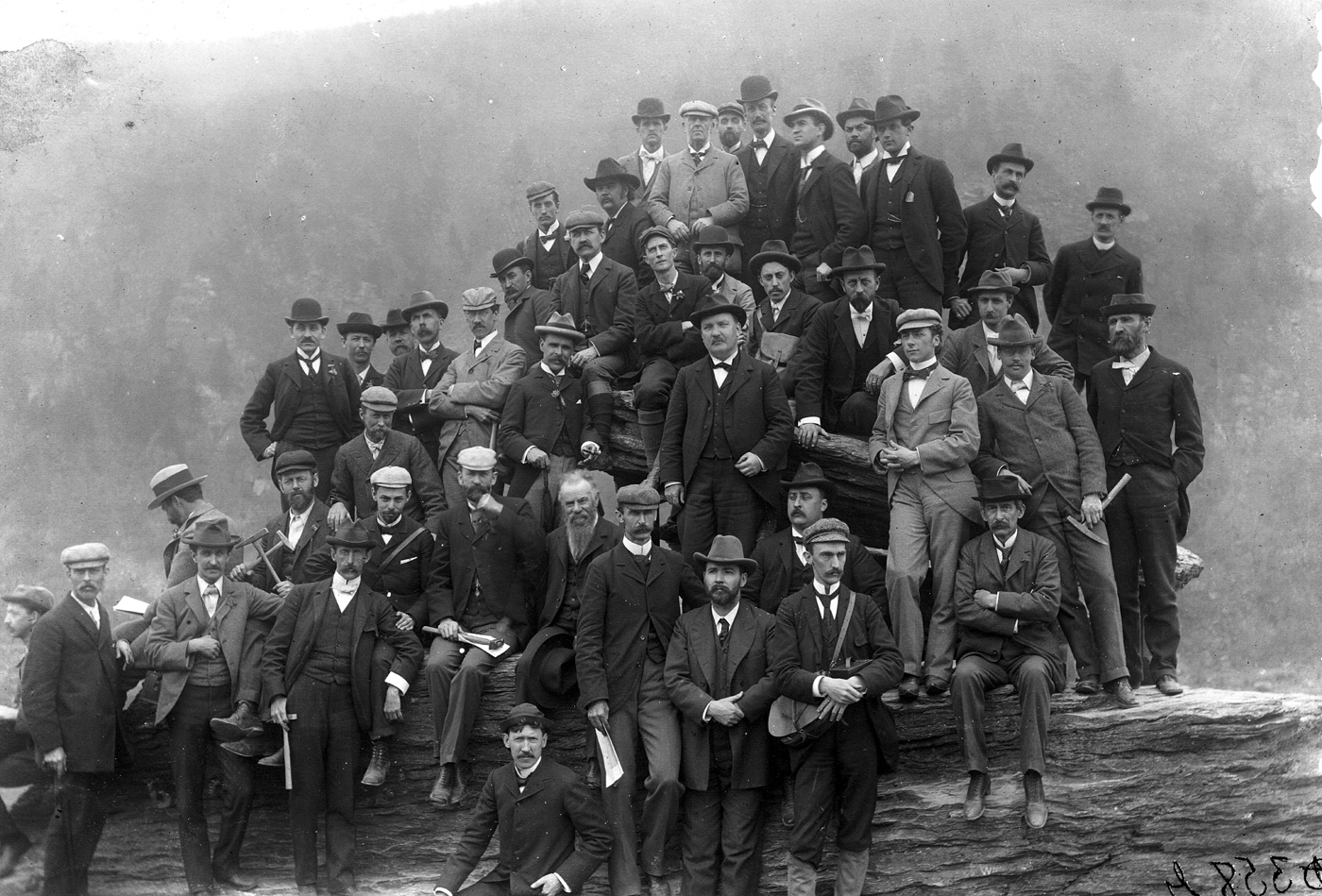
Group photo taken during the aforementioned geological field excursion to Harpers Ferry, West Virginia, May 1897. Sir Archibald Geikie is in the top row, second from the left, wearing a light-colored jacket.

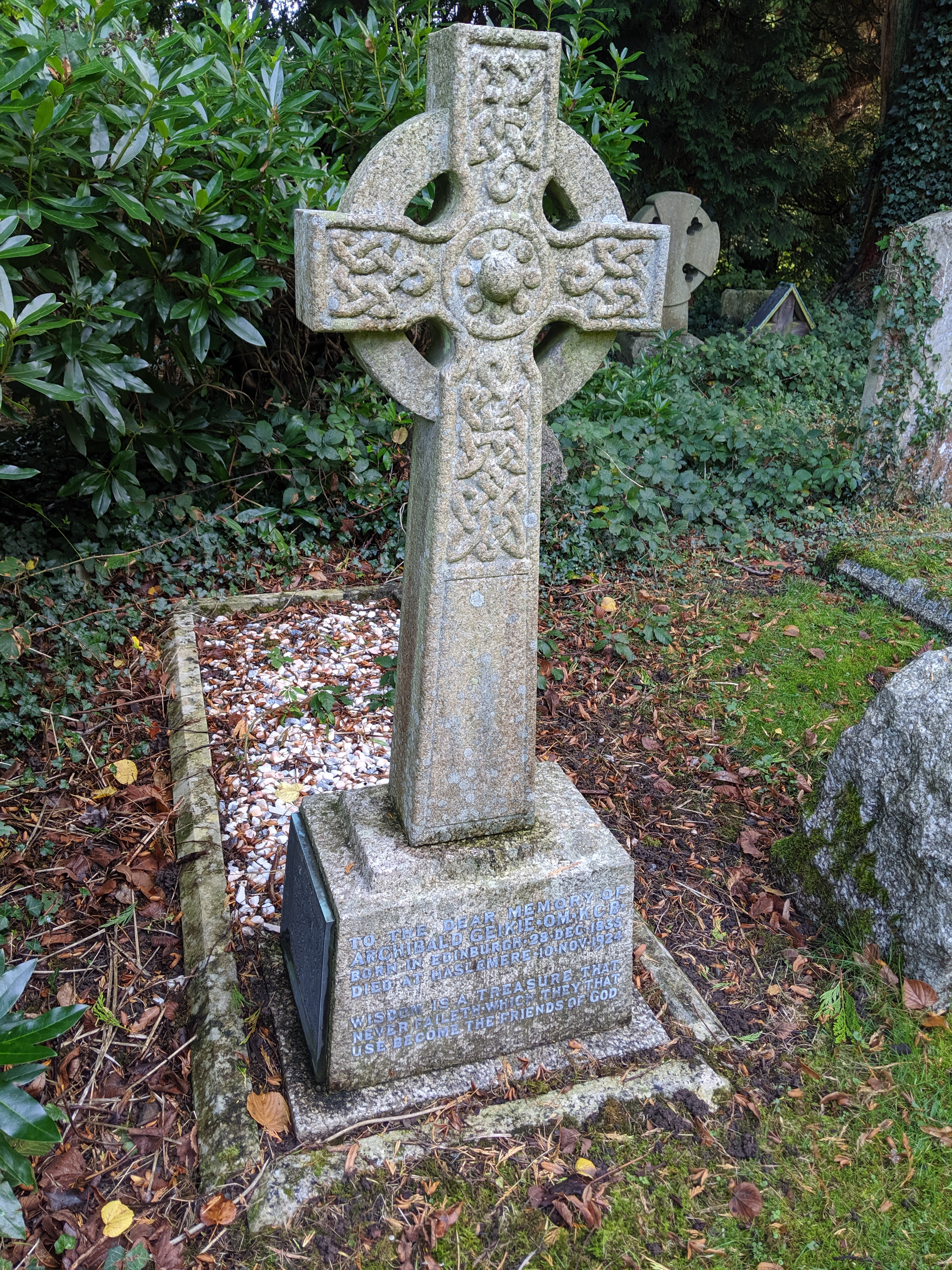
Geikie's gravestone in St Bartholomew's churchyard, Haslemere, Surrey U.K. The inscription reads: "To the dear memory of Archibald Geikie OM KCB Born in Edinburgh 28 Dec 1835 Died at Haslemere 10 Nov 1924. Wisdom is a treasure that never faileth, Which they that use become the friends of God"

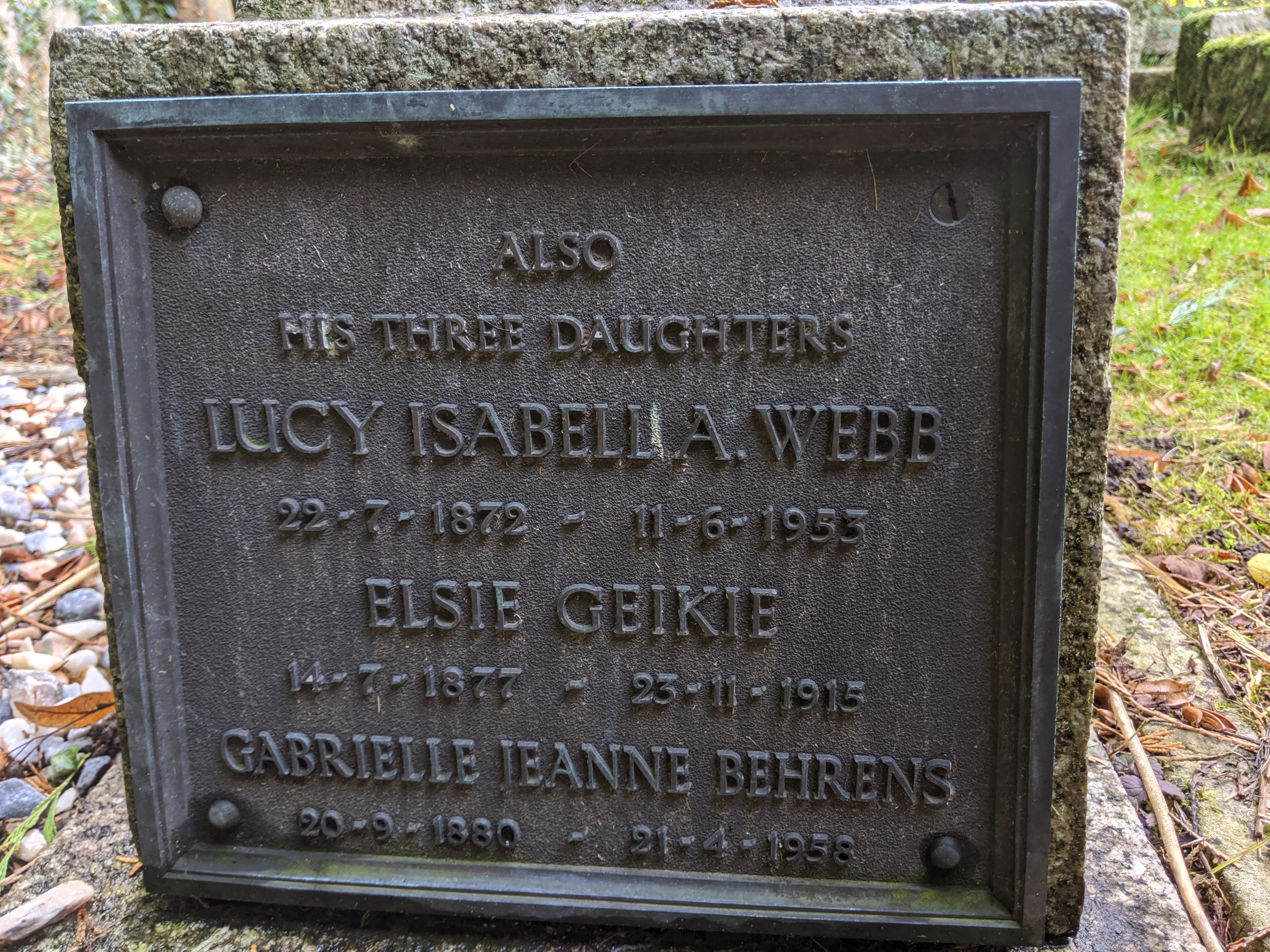
Attachment to Geikie's gravestone in memory of his daughters

== Selected bibliography ==
- The Story of a Boulder: Or Gleanings from a Note-book of a Field Geologist (1858)
- Physical Geography (1877)
- Textbook of Geology – First edition (1882) – Second edition (1885) – Third edition (1893)
- Geological Sketches at Home and Abroad (1882)
- An Elementary Geography of the British Isles (1888)
- Memoir of Sir Andrew Crombie Ramsay (1895)
- The Ancient Volcanoes of Britain, 2 volumes (1897) vol. 1 vol. 2
- Types of Scenery and Their Influence on Literature (1898)
- The Founders of Geology – First edition (1897) – Second edition (1905)
- Elementary Lessons in Physical Geography (1903)
- Scottish Reminiscences (1904)
- Landscape in History and Other Essays (1905)
- Annals of the Royal Society Club (1917)

== See also ==
- List of presidents of the Royal Society

Professional and academic associations
Preceded by Lord Rayleigh	40th President of the Royal Society; 1908–1913	Succeeded by William Crookes
