= James Geikie =

Scottish geologist (1839–1915)

Signature
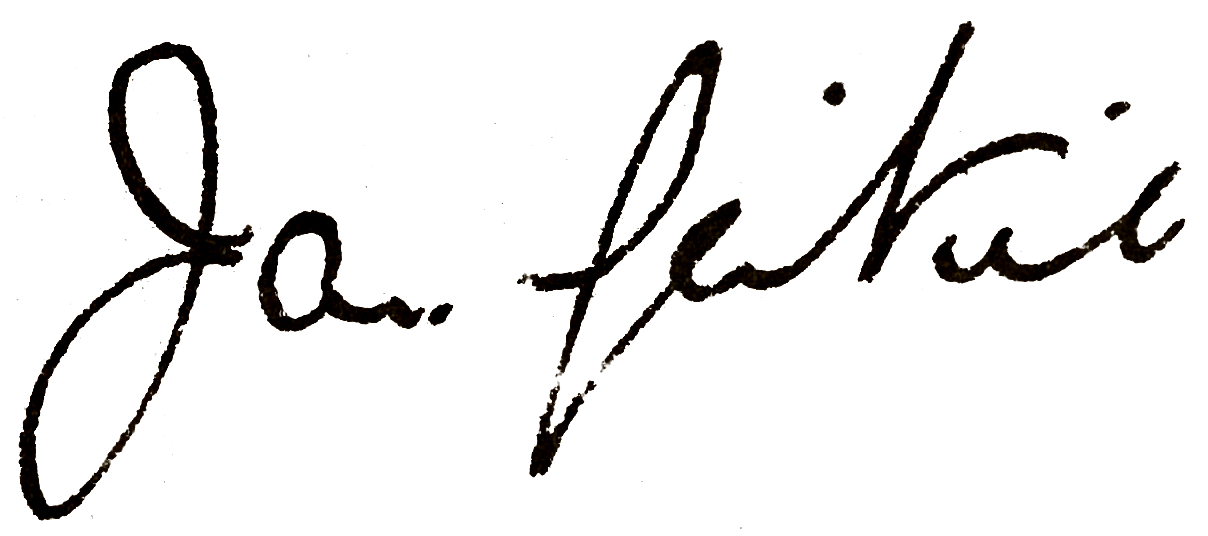

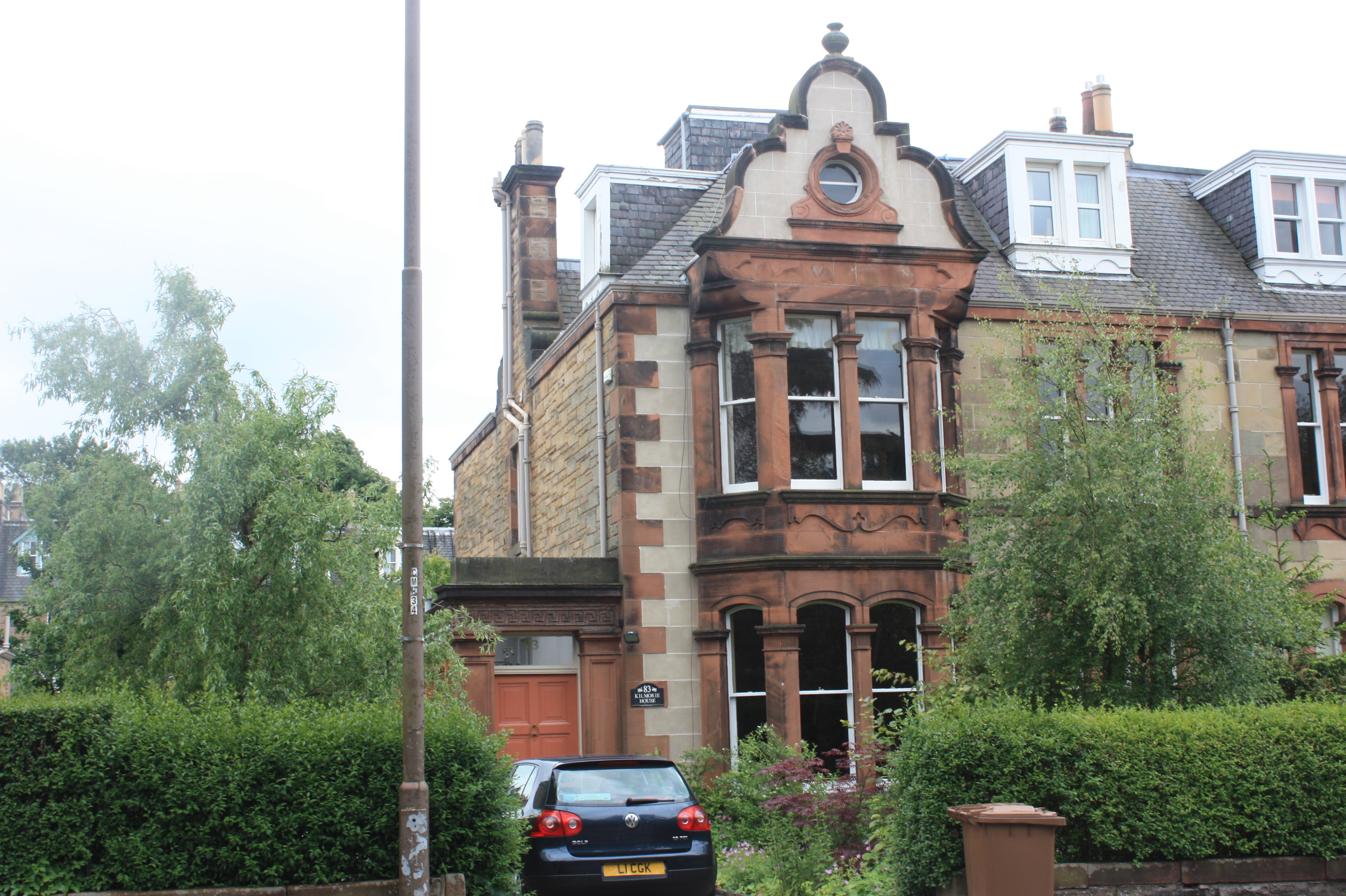
Geikie's final home at 83 Colinton Road, Edinburgh

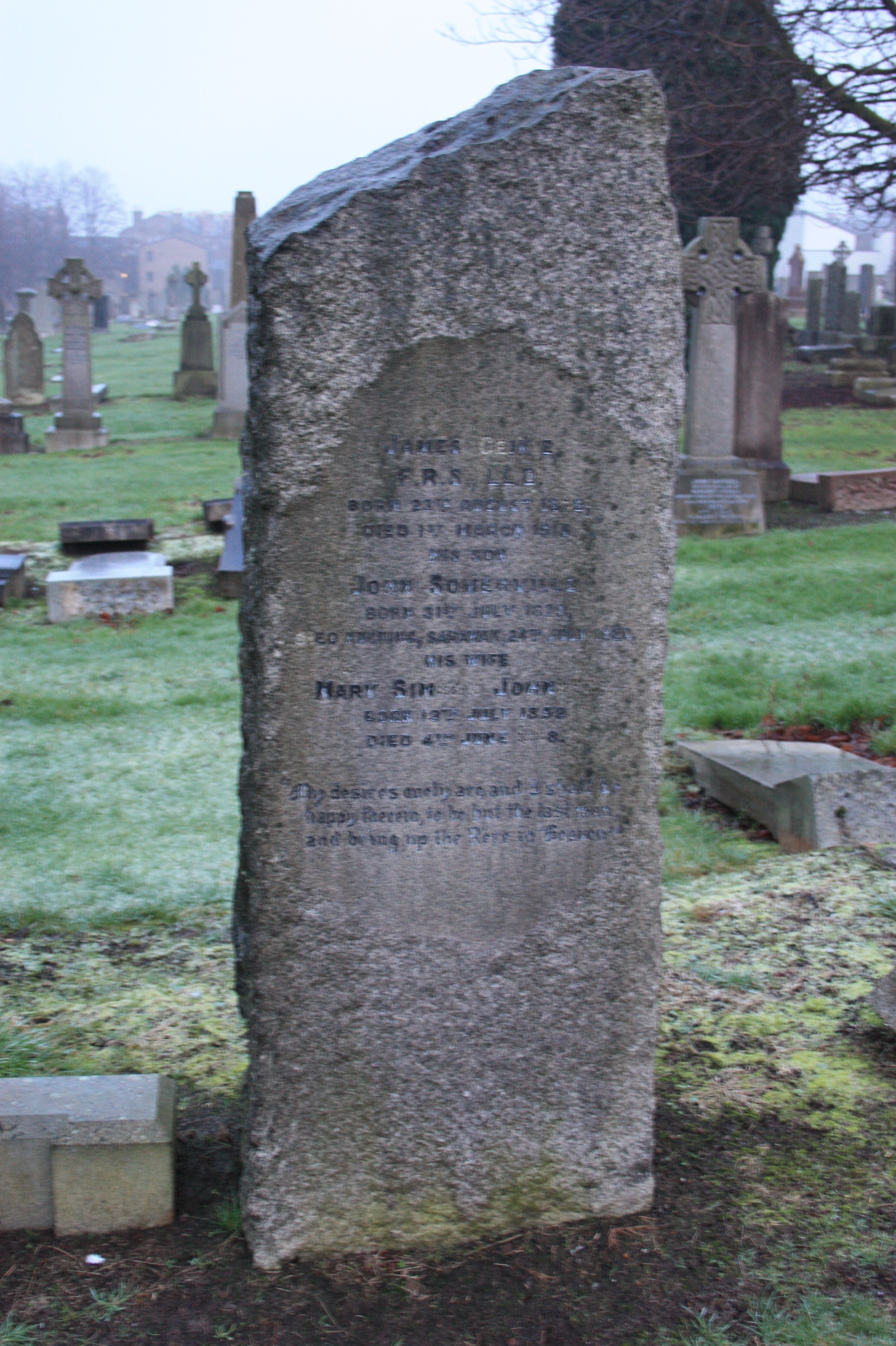
The grave of James Geikie, Morningside Cemetery, Edinburgh

James Murdoch Geikie PRSE FRS LLD (23 August 1839 – 1 March 1915) was a Scottish geologist. He was professor of geology at the University of Edinburgh from 1882 to 1914.

== Early life ==
He was born in Edinburgh, the son of James Stuart Geikie and Isabella Thom, and younger brother of Sir Archibald Geikie. His father was a wig-maker and perfumer in Edinburgh operating from 35 North Bridge. James was educated at the Royal High School, Edinburgh and initially apprenticed as a printer to Archibald Constable and Company before going to University of Edinburgh to study geology.

== Career ==
He served on the Geological Survey from 1862 until 1882, when he succeeded his brother as Murchison professor of geology and mineralogy at the University of Edinburgh. He took as his special subject of investigation the origin of surface-features, and the part played in their formation by glacial action. His views are embodied in his chief work, The Great Ice Age and its Relation to the Antiquity of Man (1874; 3rd ed., 1894).

In 1871 he was elected a fellow of the Royal Society of Edinburgh. His proposer was his brother, Archibald Geikie. He served twice as vice-president (1892–97 and 1900–05) and once as president (1913–15).

He was elected a fellow of the Royal Society in 1875, his candidacy citation reading

Author of "The Great Ice Age and its relation to the Antiquity of Man" "On the Changes of Climate during the Glacial Epoch" "On the Glacial Phenomena of the Outer Hebrides" (Quart Journ Geol Soc) and of various papers on Palaeozoic, Glacial and Post-Tertiary Geology in the Transactions of the Royal Society of Edinburgh; the Quarterly Journal of the Geological Society of London; the Transactions of the North of England Institute of Mining and Mechanical Engineers; the Journal of the Iron and Steel Institute; the Transactions of the Glasgow Geological Society; and the Geological Magazine; District Surveyor on the Geological Survey in Scotland for years, during which time he has surveyed, and drawn many sections through, large areas in the Central and Southern districts of Scotland which he has described in the published "Explanations" issued by the Geological Survey.

In 1876, he was elected as a member to the American Philosophical Society.

From 1861 he lived at 16 Duncan Street in Edinburgh. In 1882 he moved to London, returning to Edinburgh only in later life.

Geikie became the leader of the school that upholds the all-important action of land-ice, as against those geologists who assign chief importance to the work of pack ice and icebergs. Continuing this line of investigation in his Prehistoric Europe (1881), he maintained the hypothesis of five inter-Glacial periods in Great Britain, and argued that the palaeolithic deposits of the Pleistocene period were not post- but inter- or pre-Glacial. His Fragments of Earth Lore: Sketches and Addresses, Geological and Geographical (1893) and Earth Sculpture (1898) are mainly concerned with the same subject. His Outlines of Geology (1886), a standard textbook of its subject, reached its third edition in 1896; and in 1905 he published an important manual on structural and field geology.

In 1887 he displayed another side of his activity in a volume of Songs and Lyrics by H. Heine and other German Poets, done into English Verse. From 1888 he was honorary editor of the Scottish Geographical Magazine. In 1889, he was awarded the Murchison Medal of the Geological Society of London. In 1910 he was awarded the Gold Medal of the Royal Scottish Geographical Society.

In 1904 he was elected president of the Royal Scottish Geographical Society and held this role until 1910.

In later life he lived at "Kilmorie", 83 Colinton Road in south-west Edinburgh, it then being a new house by the architect Edward Calvert.

== Death ==
Geikie died at home on 1 March 1915 and is buried on the western side of Morningside Cemetery, Edinburgh.

John Muir named a glacier in Alaska after Geikie.

== Publications ==
- The Great Ice Age (1874)
- Prehistoric Europe (1880)
- Fragments of Earth Lore (1893)
- Earth Sculpture: The Origin of Land Forms (1913)
- Mountains: Their Origin Growth and Decay (1913)
- The Antiquity of Man in Europe (1914)

== See also ==
- Ordnance Gazetteer of Scotland: A Graphic and Accurate Description of Every Place in Scotland (Geikie contributed its section on Scotland's leading physical features)
