= Redoubt Peak =

Mountain on Alberta/British Columbia border in Canada

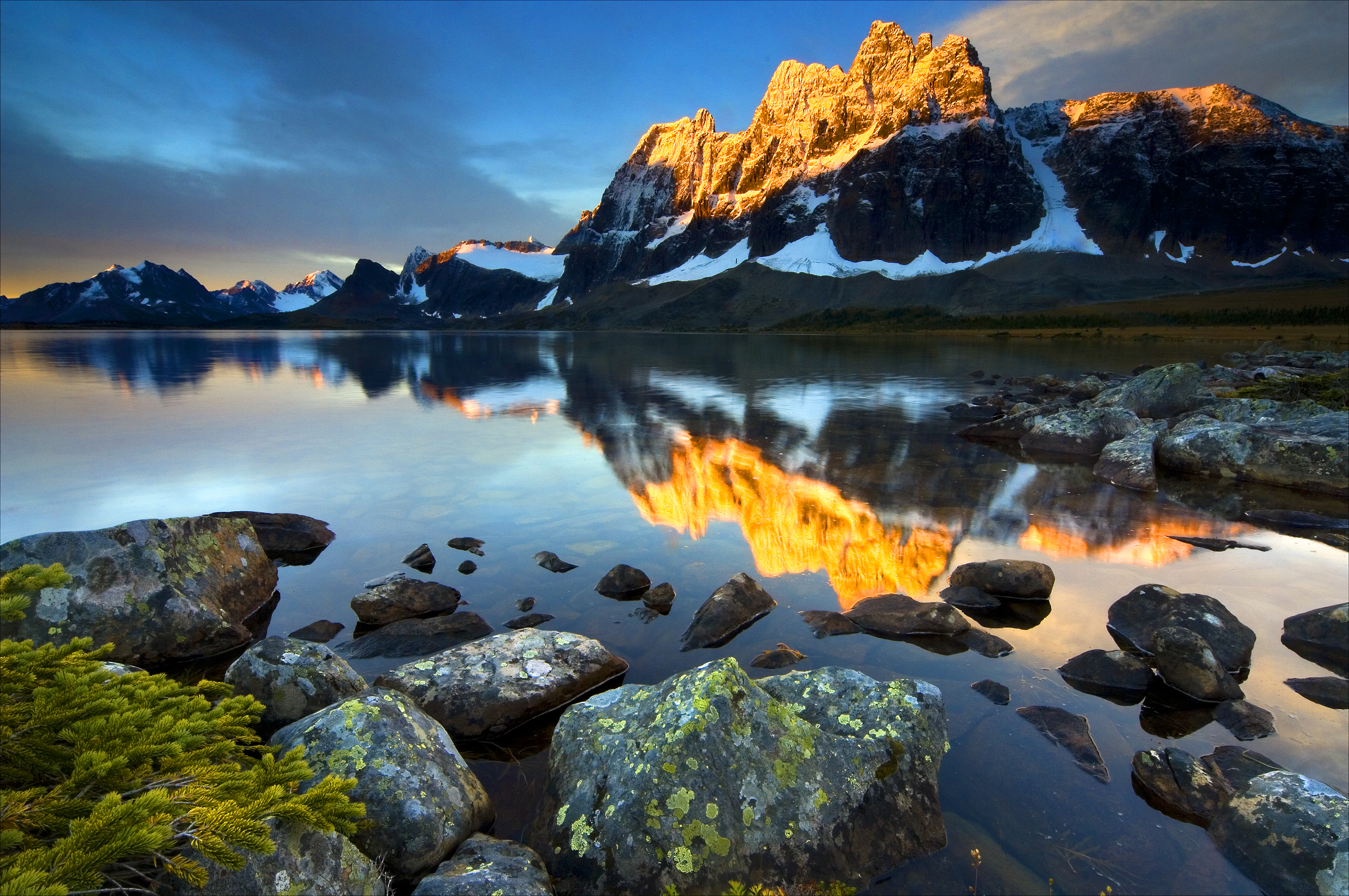
- Redoubt Peak seen from Amethyst Lakes at sunrise

Highest point
- Elevation: 3,109 m (10,200 ft) (Note: Other sources state 3115 m.)
- Prominence: 179 m (587 ft)
- Listing: Mountains of Alberta; Mountains of British Columbia
- Coordinates: 52°41′22″N 118°17′57″W

Geography
- Location within Alberta Location within British Columbia Location within Canada
- Interactive map of Redoubt Peak
- Country: Canada
- Provinces: Alberta and British Columbia
- Protected areas: Jasper National Park; Mount Robson Provincial Park
- Parent range: Park Ranges; Canadian Rockies
- Topo map: NTS 83D9 Amethyst Lakes

Climbing
- First ascent: 1927 F. H. Slark; F. Rutishauser
- Easiest route: North-West Ridge III 5.6; East Face IV 5.7

Redoubt Peak is a 3,109-metre (10,200 ft) mountain summit located on the shared border of Jasper National Park in Alberta, and Mount Robson Provincial Park in British Columbia, Canada. Redoubt Peak is part of The Ramparts in the Canadian Rockies. It was named in 1920 because it has an appearance similar to that of a redoubt on a castle. Its nearest higher peak is Dungeon Peak, 0.6 km (0.37 mi) to the southeast.

== History ==
The first ascent was made in 1927 by F. H. Slark and F. Rutishauser, who both perished on the descent. The following summer (1928), Douglas Busk and J.E. Johnson made the second ascent with Hans Fuhrer. On a ledge Fuhrer found "Slark’s rucksack with a pair of mountain boots in addition to the rest of the stuff; these were small boots, and from his size Slark must have had big feet, so I think it probable that Rutis was climbing in stockinged feet on the cliffs directly below the summit when they fell. It was a place we looked at in horror, and circumnavigated. I am firmly convinced that they fell and were not struck by falling stones", on the summit they found a tin containing the names of the missing climbers. The 1928 party inferred that Slark and Rutishauser ascended the W. ridge and were trying to descend the S. face when the accident occurred.

The mountain's name became official in 1935 by the Geographical Names Board of Canada.

== Climate ==
Based on the Köppen climate classification, Redoubt Peak is located in a subarctic climate zone with cold, snowy winters, and mild summers. Temperatures can drop below -20 °C with wind chill factors below -30 °C. Precipitation runoff from Redoubt Peak drains into the Athabasca River on its east side, and the Fraser River from the west side.

== Gallery ==
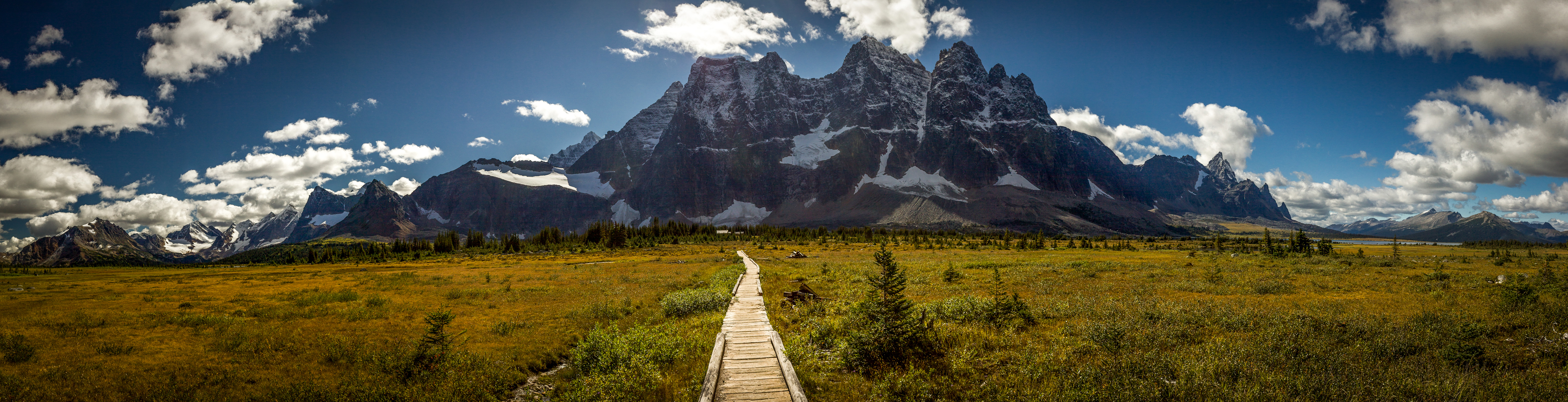
The Ramparts in Tonquin Valley with Redoubt on right

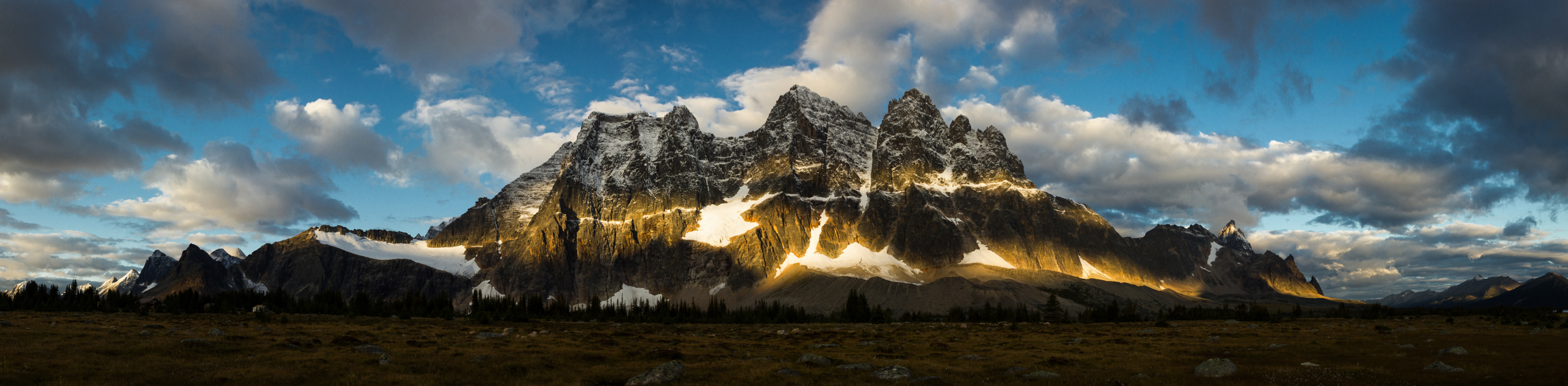
Sunrise and cloud shadows on the Tonquin Valley Ramparts. Oubliette Mountain (left), Dungeon Peak (middle), Redoubt Peak (right)

== See also ==
- List of mountains in the Canadian Rockies
- List of peaks on the Alberta–British Columbia border
