= Dungeon Peak =

Mountain in the country of Canada

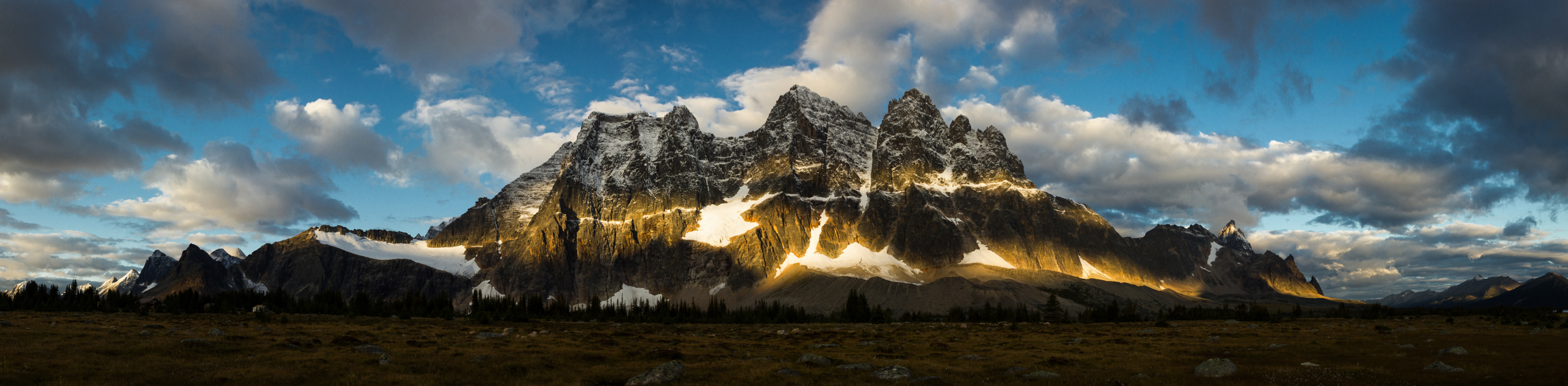
- Dungeon Peak centered, with Oubliette Mountain (left), and Redoubt Peak to right

Highest point
- Elevation: 3,129 m (10,266 ft)
- Prominence: 489 m (1,604 ft)
- Parent peak: Bennington Peak (3260 )
- Listing: Mountains of Alberta; Mountains of British Columbia
- Coordinates: 52°41′06″N 118°17′44″W

Geography
- Location within Alberta Location within British Columbia Location within Canada
- Country: Canada
- Provinces: Alberta and British Columbia
- Parent range: Park Ranges
- Topo map: NTS 83D9 Amethyst Lakes

Climbing
- First ascent: 1933 by Rex Gibson, R.C. Hind, E.L. Woolf
- Easiest route: East Face IV 5.7

Dungeon Peak is a 3,129-metre (10,266 ft) mountain summit located on the shared border of Jasper National Park in Alberta, and Mount Robson Provincial Park in British Columbia, Canada. Dungeon Peak is part of The Ramparts in the Tonquin Valley. The descriptive name was applied in 1916 by Morrison P. Bridgland (1878-1948), a Dominion Land Surveyor who named many peaks in Jasper Park and the Canadian Rockies. The mountain's name was made official in 1935 by the Geographical Names Board of Canada.

== Climate ==
Based on the Köppen climate classification, Dungeon Peak is located in a subarctic climate zone with cold, snowy winters, and mild summers. Temperatures can drop below -20 °C with wind chill factors below -30 °C.

== See also ==
- List of peaks on the British Columbia–Alberta border
- Tonquin Valley
- The Ramparts
