= Angle Peak (Alberta) =

Mountain in Jasper NP, Alberta, Canada

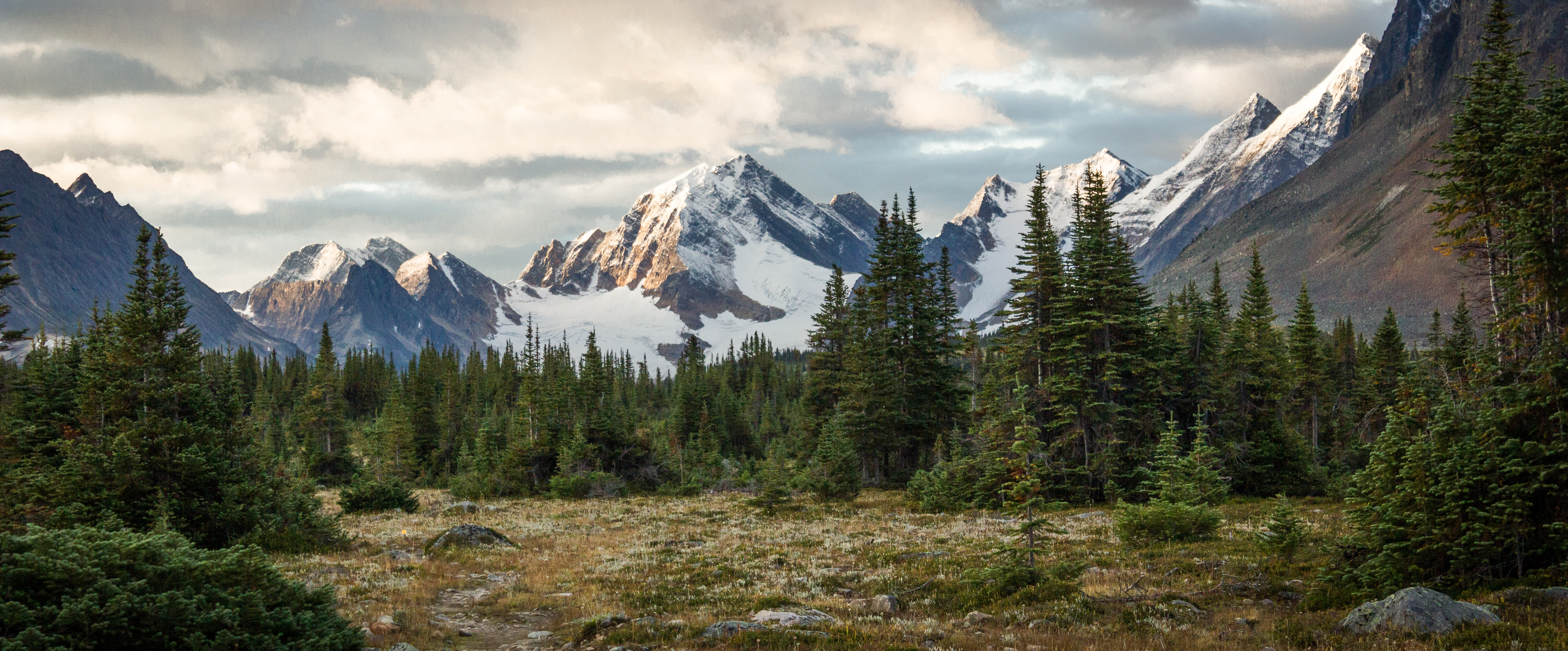
- Angle Peak centered

Highest point
- Elevation: 2,910 m (9,550 ft)
- Prominence: 370 m (1,210 ft)
- Listing: Mountains of Alberta
- Coordinates: 52°36′36″N 118°12′43″W

Geography
- Location within Alberta Location within Canada
- Country: Canada
- Province: Alberta
- Protected area: Jasper National Park
- Parent range: Park Ranges
- Topo map: NTS 83D9 Amethyst Lakes

Climbing
- First ascent: 1934

Angle Peak is a 2,910-metre (9,547 ft) mountain summit located in Jasper National Park, in the Canadian Rockies of Alberta, Canada. Angle Peak was named for the fact it stands where the ridge makes a bend. The descriptive name was applied in 1916 by Morrison P. Bridgland (1878–1948), a Dominion Land Surveyor who named many peaks in Jasper Park and the Canadian Rockies. The mountain's name was made official in 1935 by the Geographical Names Board of Canada. The mountain is situated in the Tonquin Valley, with Angle Glacier on its north slope, Alcove Mountain to its immediate west, The Ramparts 10 km (6.2 mi) to the northwest, and Mount Edith Cavell 12 km (7.5 mi) to the northeast.

== Climate ==
Based on the Köppen climate classification, Angle Peak is located in a subarctic climate with cold, snowy winters, and mild summers. Temperatures can drop below −20 °C with wind chill factors below −30 °C.

== See also ==
- Tonquin Valley
- Geography of Alberta
