= Longdale Furnace, Virginia =

Unincorporated community in Virginia, United States

- Longdale Furnace Historic District
- U.S. National Register of Historic Places
- U.S. Historic district
- Virginia Landmarks Register
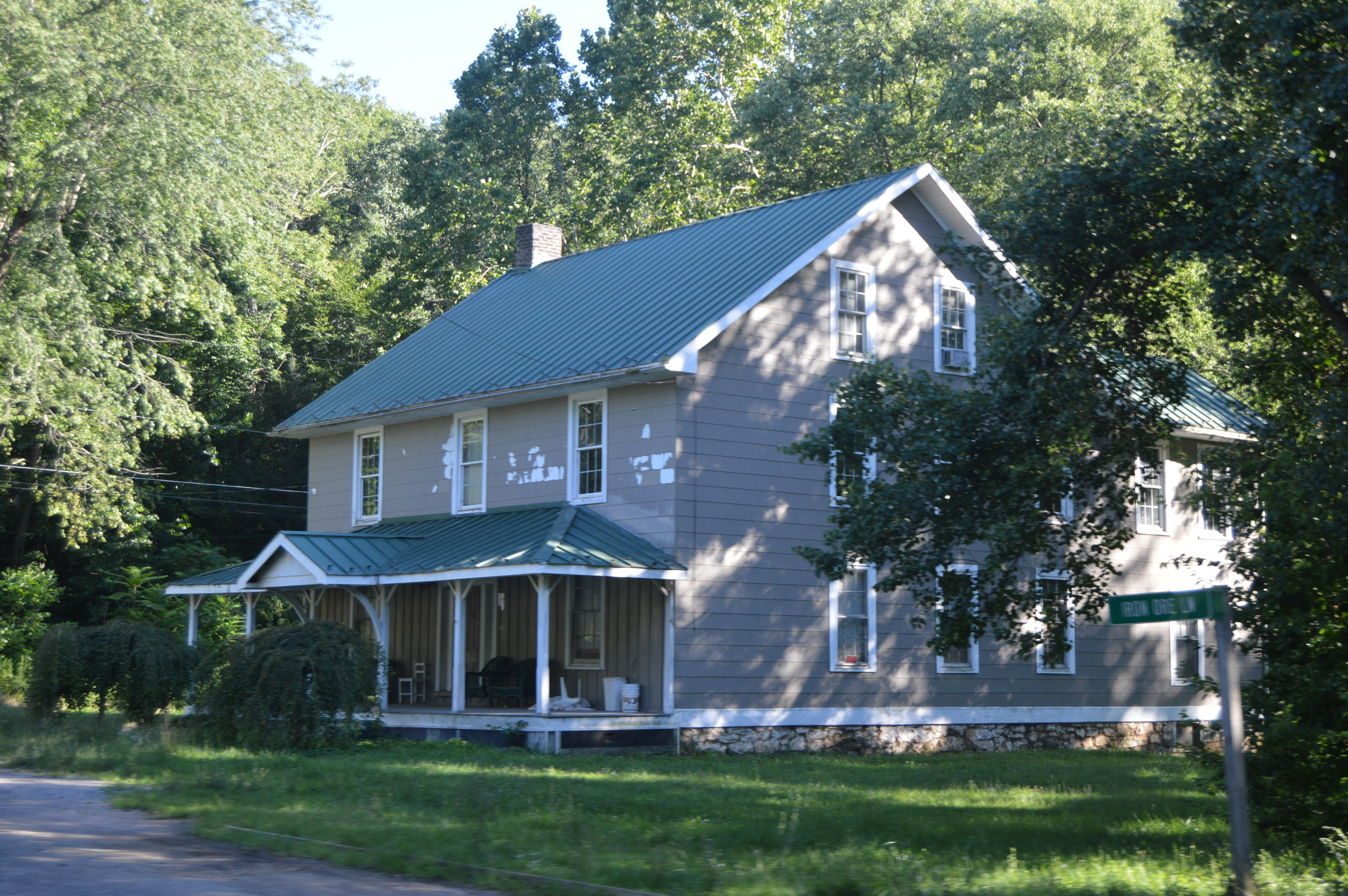
- House on State Route 269

- Location within Virginia Location within the United States
- Location: Roughly, along Longdale Furnace Rd., Iron Ore Ln., Church Rd. and Conner Ln., near Clifton Forge, Virginia
- Coordinates: 37°48′33″N 79°41′04″W
- Area: 50 acres (20 ha)
- Built: 1827
- Architectural style: Queen Anne, Federal
- NRHP reference No.: 95000898
- VLR No.: 003-0338

Significant dates
- Added to NRHP: August 3, 1995
- Designated VLR: April 28, 1995

Longdale Furnace is an unincorporated community located east of Clifton Forge in Alleghany County, Virginia, United States.

Much of the community was designated a national historic district and added to the National Register of Historic Places in 1998. The district encompasses 27 contributing buildings, eight contributing sites and three contributing structures historically associated with the Longdale Iron Company foundries' operations and personnel. It includes the original stone furnace stack (1827), two-story Longdale Iron Company Office (late-1820s), Longdale Iron Company Laboratory, two tall cylindrical brick chimneys, brick machine shop, Firmstone-Johnson House (1870s–1880s), the Queen Anne-style Assistant Manager's House (1870s–1880s), and the Company Doctor's Office.
