= Mount Geikie (Canada) =

Mountain in British Columbia, Canada

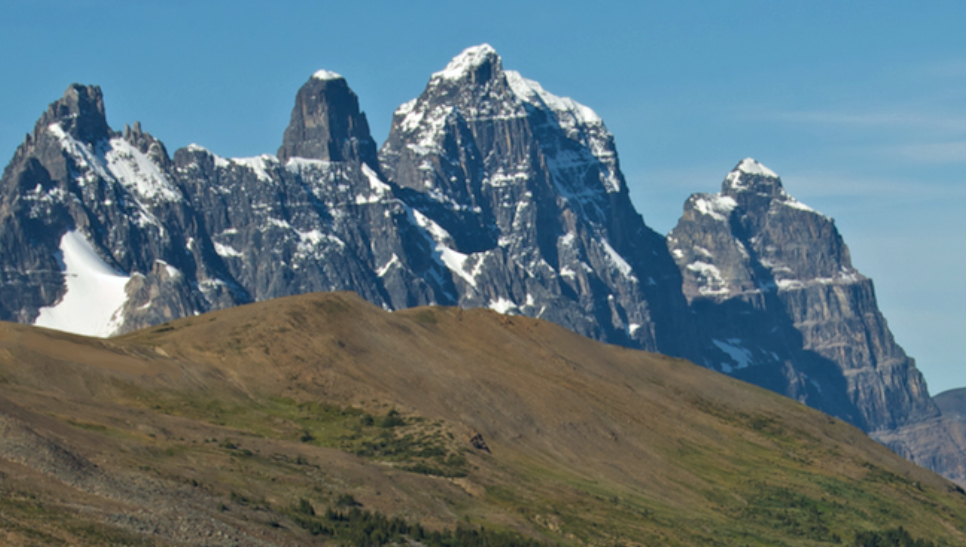
- Mount Geikie centered, flanked by Barbican Peak to right, Bastion Peak and Turret Peak to left

Highest point
- Elevation: 3,298 m (10,820 ft)
- Prominence: 808 m (2,651 ft)
- Parent peak: Mount Fraser (3313 m)
- Listing: Mountains of British Columbia
- Coordinates: 52°42′50″N 118°23′29″W

Geography
- Location within British Columbia Location within Canada
- Interactive map of Mount Geikie
- Country: Canada
- Province: British Columbia
- District: Cariboo Land District
- Protected Area: Mount Robson Provincial Park
- Parent range: The Ramparts; Canadian Rockies
- Topo map: NTS 83D9 Amethyst Lakes

Geology
- Rock age: Cambrian
- Rock type: Quartzite

Climbing
- First ascent: 1924 by V.A. Fynn, M.D. Geddes, C.G. Wates

Mount Geikie, pronounced like "geeky", is a 3,298-metre (10,820-foot) mountain summit located in Mount Robson Provincial Park in British Columbia, Canada. Situated 28 km (17 mi) southwest of Jasper near the Tonquin Valley, Mount Geikie is the highest peak of The Ramparts in the Canadian Rockies. Its nearest higher peak is Mount Fraser, 8.0 km (5.0 mi) to the southeast, and the Continental Divide lies 3.0 km (1.9 mi) to the east. Mount Geikie is composed of quartzite of the Cambrian period. This rock was pushed east and over the top of younger rock during the Laramide orogeny. The vertical wall of its north face is over 1,500-metre (4,900-foot) high, and has been compared to the other great north faces of the Canadian Rockies such as North Twin, Alberta, and Kitchener.

== History ==
Mount Geikie was named in 1898 by J. E. McEvoy of the Geological Survey of Canada for Scottish geologist Sir Archibald Geikie (1835–1924), who was the director-general of the British Geological Survey from 1882 to 1901. The mountain was labelled on Arthur O. Wheeler's 1911 topographic map of the Mount Robson area. The mountain's name was officially adopted in 1951 when approved by the Geographical Names Board of Canada.

== Climbing ==
The first ascent of Mount Geikie was made in 1924 by Val Fynn, M.D. Geddes, and Cyril G. Wates via a southwest route. The normal climbing route is the Southeast Face (IV, 5.5).

North Face

The first ascent of the north face was accomplished in August 1967 by John R. Hudson and Royal Robbins (class 5.9). Hudson died in 1969 while scouting a new route on Huascarán. The first solo ascent was made in August 2017 by Tony McLane of Canada. Other routes include:

- Lowe/Hannibal (class 5.10b) in August 1979 by George Lowe and Dean Hannibal.
- Hesse-Shilling (5.10) by Mark Hesse and Brad Shilling in August 1994.
- Honky Tonquin (VI+ 5.10 A3) by Seth Shaw and Scott Simper in July 1999.

== Climate ==
Based on the Köppen climate classification, Mount Geikie is located in a subarctic climate zone with cold, snowy winters, and mild summers. Winter temperatures can drop below -20 °C with wind chill factors below -30 °C. The months July and August offer the most favorable weather months for climbing. However, these months coincide with mosquito season, which requires effective defenses for the days-long approach to reach the mountain. Precipitation runoff from Mount Geikie drains into Geikie Creek and Tonquin Creek, both tributaries and headwaters of the Fraser River.

== See also ==
- Geography of British Columbia
