= The Ramparts (Canada) =

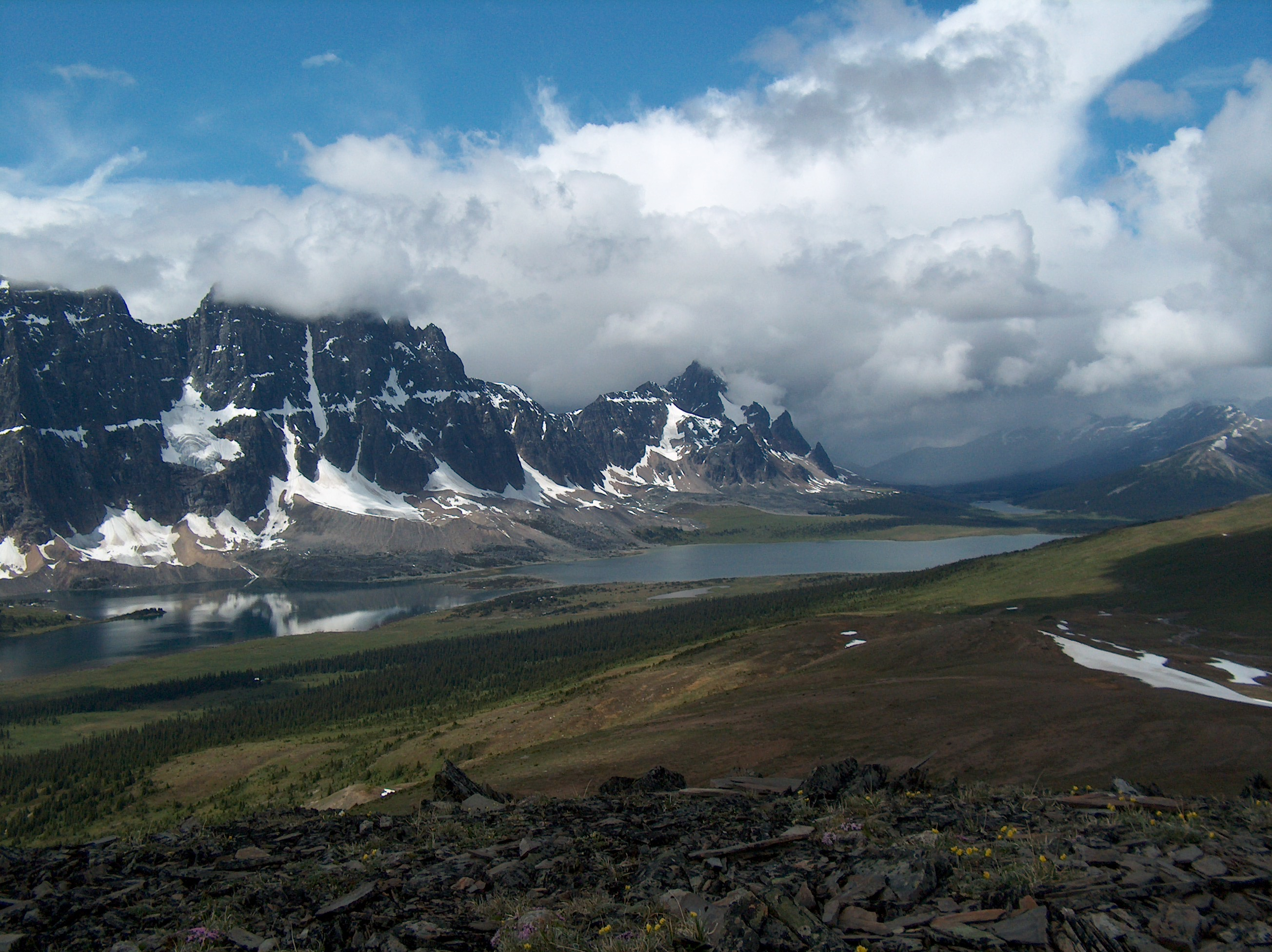
- The Ramparts and Amethyst Lake in Jasper National Park

Highest point
- Peak: Mount Geikie
- Elevation: 3,298 m (10,820 ft)
- Listing: Ranges of the Canadian Rockies
- Coordinates: 52°42′50″N 118°23′29″W

Dimensions
- Area: 83 km^{2} (32 mi^{2})

Geography
- Location within Alberta Location within British Columbia Location within Canada
- Country: Canada
- Provinces: Alberta and British Columbia
- Range coordinates: 52°42′34″N 118°21′33″W
- Parent range: Continental Ranges
- Topo map: NTS 83D9 Amethyst Lakes

The Ramparts are a mountain range in the Canadian Rockies. Part of the Park Ranges, they straddle the Continental Divide and lie partly within Jasper National Park in Alberta and Mount Robson Provincial Park in British Columbia.

There are 10 named summits in the group, the highest of which is Mount Geikie. Most were named by the Alpine Club of Canada and carry military engineering themed names such as Bastion, Parapet, Redoubt, Postern, and Dungeon. They form a western boundary for the Tonquin Valley. Amethyst Lake lies to the east, while the headwaters of the Fraser River bound it to the west.
