= Mount Muir (disambiguation) =

Mount Muir is a peak in the Sierra Nevada of California, United States.

Mount Muir may also refer to:

- Mount Muir (Alaska), United States
- Mount Muir (High Rock Range), a mountain in Alberta/British Columbia, Canada
- Mount Muir (Vancouver Island), a mountain in British Columbia, Canada
