= Mount Helen =

Mount Helen may refer to:

- Mount Helen (British Columbia) in British Columbia, Canada
- Mount Helen (Montana) in Montana, USA
- Mount Helen (Wyoming) in Wyoming, USA
- Mount Helen, Victoria in Ballarat, Australia
