= Serendipity Spire =

Mountain in British Columbia, Canada

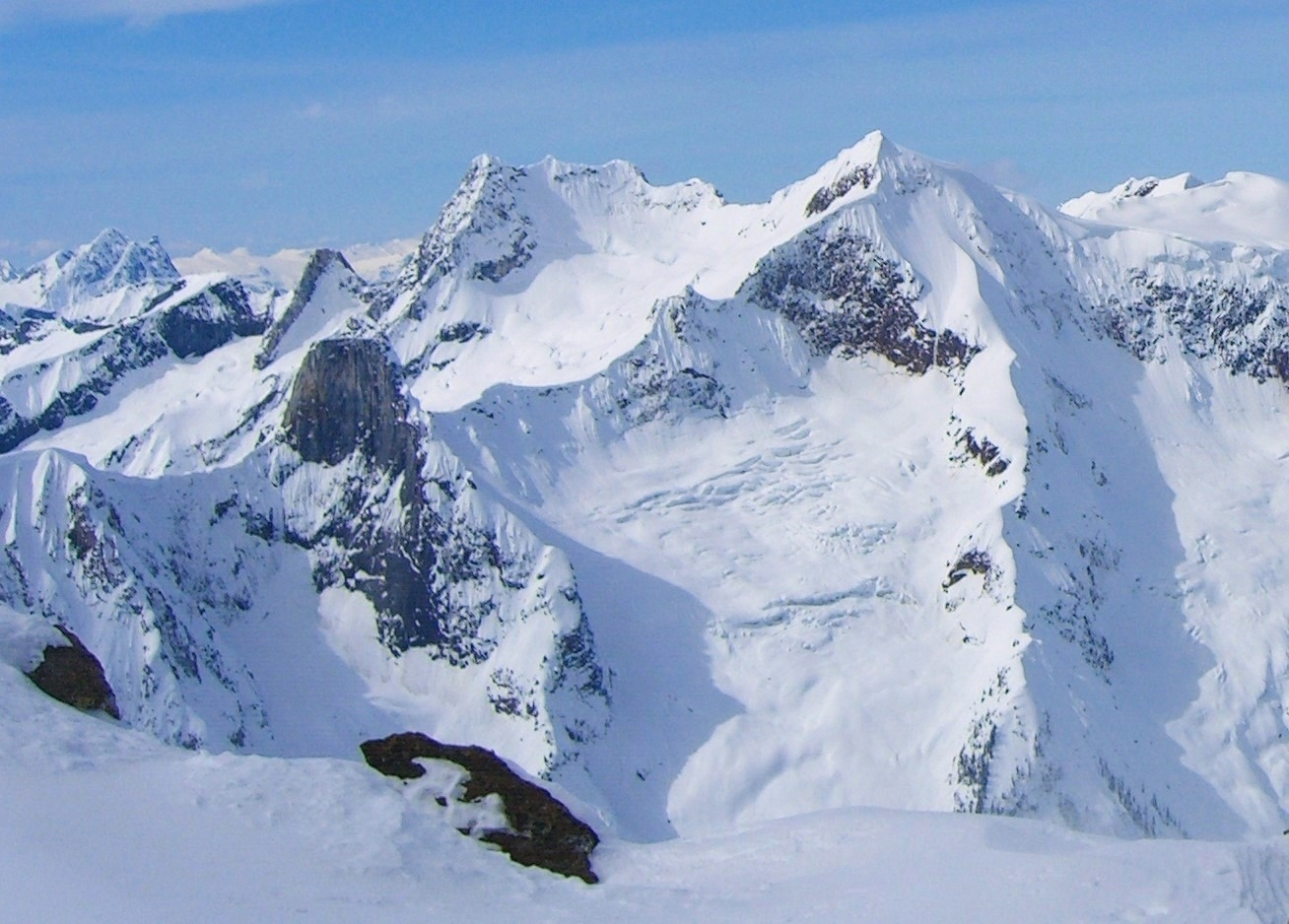
- East aspect, to the right

Highest point
- Elevation: 2,857 m (9,373 ft)
- Prominence: 747 m (2,451 ft)
- Isolation: 4.02 km (2.50 mi)
- Listing: Mountains of British Columbia
- Coordinates: 51°44′41″N 118°00′55″W

Naming
- Etymology: Serendipity

Geography
- Location within British Columbia Location within Canada
- Interactive map of Serendipity Spire
- Country: Canada
- Province: British Columbia
- District: Kootenay Land District
- Parent range: Selkirk Mountains
- Topo map: NTS 82M9 Goldstream River

Serendipity Spire is a 2,857-metre (9,373-foot) mountain in British Columbia, Canada.

== Description ==
Serendipity Spire is located 88 km (55 mi) northwest of Golden in the Selkirk Mountains. Serendipity Spire is surrounded by glaciers, the largest of which is the OK Glacier to the northwest. Precipitation runoff and glacial meltwater from the peak's slopes drains into tributaries of the Columbia River. Topographic relief is significant as the summit rises 1,457 metres (4,780 ft) above Austerity Creek in approximately 2 km (1.2 mi). The peak was so named by American mountaineer William Lowell Putnam III "...because the mountain was inspiring to look at," which was a Putnam malapropism since serendipity is finding something valuable or agreeable, that hadn't been sought. The mountain's toponym was officially adopted on January 23, 1973, by the Geographical Names Board of Canada.

== Climate ==
Based on the Köppen climate classification, Serendipity Spire is located in a subarctic climate zone with cold, snowy winters, and mild summers. Winter temperatures can drop below −20 °C with wind chill factors below −30 °C. This climate supports several glaciers surrounding the peak.

== See also ==
- Geography of British Columbia
