= Upright Mountain =

Mountain in Alberta and British Columbia, Canada

- Location within Alberta Location within British Columbia Location within Canada

Highest point
- Elevation: 2,978 m (9,770 ft)
- Prominence: 760 m (2,490 ft)
- Listing: Mountains of Alberta; Mountains of British Columbia
- Coordinates: 53°11′16″N 118°51′42″W

Geography
- Country: Canada
- Provinces: Alberta and British Columbia
- Parent range: Front Ranges
- Topo map: NTS 83E2 Resplendent Creek

Climbing
- First ascent: 1911 by Conrad Kain

Upright Mountain is located east of the head of the Moose River at the NE side of Mount Robson Provincial Park on the Continental Divide marking the Alberta-British Columbia border. Arthur O. Wheeler named the mountain in 1911 as the strata of the mountain have been upheaved to an almost vertical position.

== See also ==
- List of peaks on the Alberta–British Columbia border
