= Aries Peak =

Mountain in Alberta and British Columbia, Canada

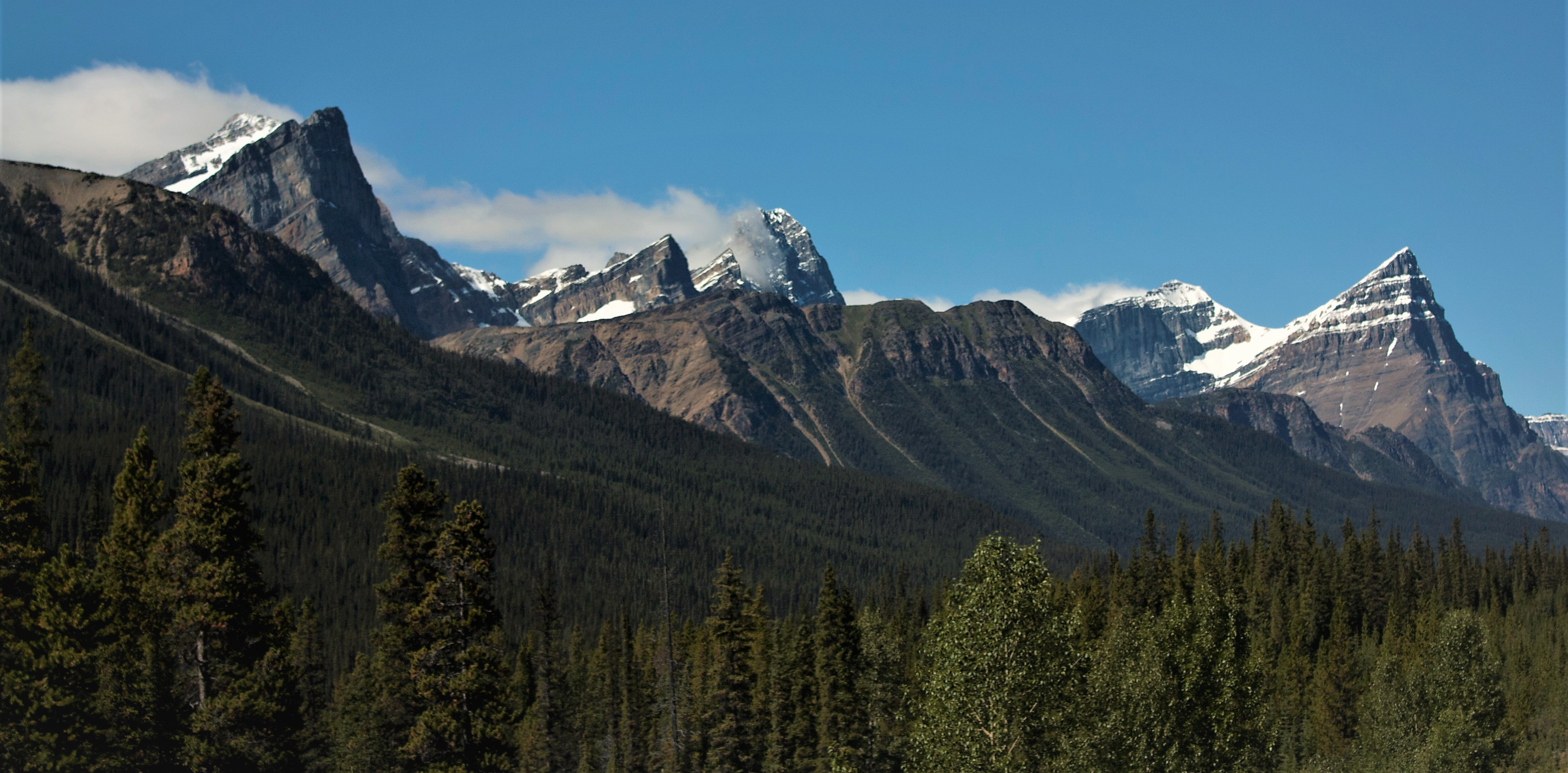
- Aries Peak (far left)

Highest point
- Elevation: 3,012 m (9,882 ft)
- Prominence: 227 m (745 ft)
- Parent peak: Howse Peak (3295 m)
- Listing: Mountains of Alberta; Mountains of British Columbia
- Coordinates: 51°47′18″N 116°38′47″W

Geography
- Location within Alberta Location within British Columbia Location within Canada
- Country: Canada
- Provinces: Alberta and British Columbia
- District: Kootenay Land District
- Protected area: Banff National Park
- Parent range: Waputik Mountains
- Topo map: NTS 82N15 Mistaya Lake

Climbing
- First ascent: 1944 Mr. and Mrs. D.W. Measuroll, John Monroe Thorington, Edward Feuz jr.

Aries Peak is a mountain in the Waputik Mountains, a subrange of the Canadian Rockies. It is located 5 km (3 mi) west of the Icefields Parkway, above Chephren Lake, on the continental divide between Alberta and British Columbia.

Aries Peak was named in 1918 by Arthur O. Wheeler for the sheep (also known as Aries) seen on its slopes.

== Climate ==
Based on the Köppen climate classification, Aries Peak is located in a subarctic climate zone with cold, snowy winters, and mild summers. Temperatures can drop below −20 °C with wind chill factors below −30 °C.
