= Treadmill Ridge =

Ridge in Alberta and British Columbia, Canada

- Location within Alberta Location within British Columbia Location within Canada

Highest point
- Elevation: 2,716 m (8,911 ft)
- Prominence: 760 m (2,490 ft)
- Listing: Mountains of Alberta; Mountains of British Columbia
- Coordinates: 53°12′24″N 118°53′25″W

Geography
- Country: Canada
- Provinces: Alberta and British Columbia
- District: Cariboo Land District
- Parent range: Front Ranges
- Topo map: NTS 83E2 Resplendent Creek

Treadmill Ridge is a mountain ridge located at the northern end of Mount Robson Provincial Park, on the Alberta/British Columbia border. It is Alberta's 98th most prominent mountain. It was named in 1923 by Arthur O. Wheele who believed that the mountain resembled a treadmill.

== See also ==
- List of peaks on the Alberta–British Columbia border
