= Mount Alpha Centauri =

Mountain in British Columbia, Canada

- Location within British Columbia Location within Canada

Highest point
- Elevation: 3,102 m (10,177 ft)
- Prominence: 102 m (335 ft)
- Listing: Mountains of British Columbia
- Coordinates: 50°36′22″N 116°31′54″W

Geography
- Location: British Columbia, Canada
- District: Kootenay Land District
- Parent range: Purcell Mountains
- Topo map: NTS 82K10 Howser Creek

Climbing
- First ascent: 1969 by K. Rinehart, M. & Robert C. West

Mount Alpha Centauri is a 3,102-metre (10,177 ft) mountain in southeastern British Columbia, Canada. Named in 1969 by Robert West in association with North Star Peak. Alpha Centauri lies almost directly opposite of the North Star.
