= Alnus Peak =

Mountain on the Alberta/British Columbia boundary in Canada

- Location within Alberta Location within British Columbia Location within Canada

Highest point
- Elevation: 2,968 m (9,738 ft)
- Prominence: 533 m (1,749 ft)
- Listing: Mountains of Alberta; Mountains of British Columbia
- Coordinates: 52°29′15″N 118°00′26″W

Geography
- Country: Canada
- Provinces: Alberta and British Columbia
- District: Kootenay Land District
- Protected areas: Jasper National Park; Hamber Provincial Park
- Parent range: Park Ranges
- Topo map: NTS 83D8 Athabasca Pass

Climbing
- First ascent: 1920 Boundary Commission

Alnus Peak is located on the Canadian provincial boundary between Alberta and British Columbia. It was named in 1921 by Arthur O. Wheeler; alnus is the Latin name of the Alder tree. The name may refer to the dense stands of Red Alder found in the area.

== See also ==
- List of peaks on the Alberta–British Columbia border
