= Mount Trutch =

Mountain in Alberta and British Columbia, Canada

- Location within Alberta Location within British Columbia Location within Canada

Highest point
- Elevation: 3,258 m (10,689 ft)
- Prominence: 206 m (676 ft)
- Parent peak: Mount Barnard (3339 m)
- Listing: Mountains of Alberta; Mountains of British Columbia
- Coordinates: 51°42′16″N 116°52′55″W

Geography
- Country: Canada
- Provinces: Alberta and British Columbia
- Parent range: Park Ranges
- Topo map: NTS 82N10 Blaeberry River

Climbing
- First ascent: July 14, 1922 by Howard Palmer, J. Monroe Thorington, Edward Feuz Jr.

Mount Trutch is a mountain located on the border of Alberta and British Columbia, Canada. It was named in 1920 after Sir Joseph Trutch, a Canadian politician who was the first Lieutenant Governor of British Columbia.

== See also ==
- List of peaks on the British Columbia–Alberta border
