= Stairway Peak =

Mountain in Alberta and British Columbia, Canada

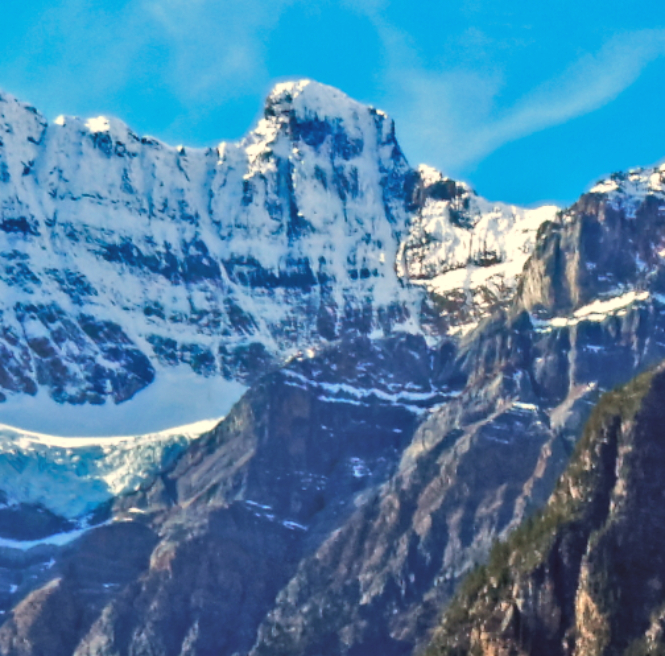

Highest point
- Elevation: 2,999 m (9,839 ft)
- Prominence: 105 m (344 ft)
- Parent peak: Howse Peak (3295 m)
- Listing: Mountains of Alberta; Mountains of British Columbia
- Coordinates: 51°47′36″N 116°39′22″W

Geography
- Location within Alberta Location within British Columbia Location within Canada
- Country: Canada
- Provinces: Alberta and British Columbia
- Protected area: Banff National Park
- Parent range: Waputik Mountains
- Topo map: NTS 82N15 Mistaya Lake

Climbing
- First ascent: 1944 Mr. and Mrs. D.W. Measuroll, J. Monroe Thorington, Edward Feuz jr.

Stairway Peak is a 3,006 metres (9,862 ft) mountain summit located on the Continental Divide, on the shared border of Alberta and British Columbia in the Canadian Rockies. It is also on the shared border between Banff National Park and Yoho National Park, and can be seen from the Icefields Parkway. It was named in 1918 by Arthur O. Wheeler.

== Geology ==
Stairway Peak is composed of sedimentary rock laid down during the Precambrian to Jurassic periods. Formed in shallow seas, this sedimentary rock was pushed east and over the top of younger rock during the Laramide orogeny.

== Climate ==
Based on the Köppen climate classification, Stairway Peak is located in a subarctic climate zone with cold, snowy winters, and mild summers. Temperatures can drop below −20 °C with wind chill factors below −30 °C. Precipitation runoff from the peak drains east to the Mistaya River, or west into tributaries of the Blaeberry River.

== Gallery ==
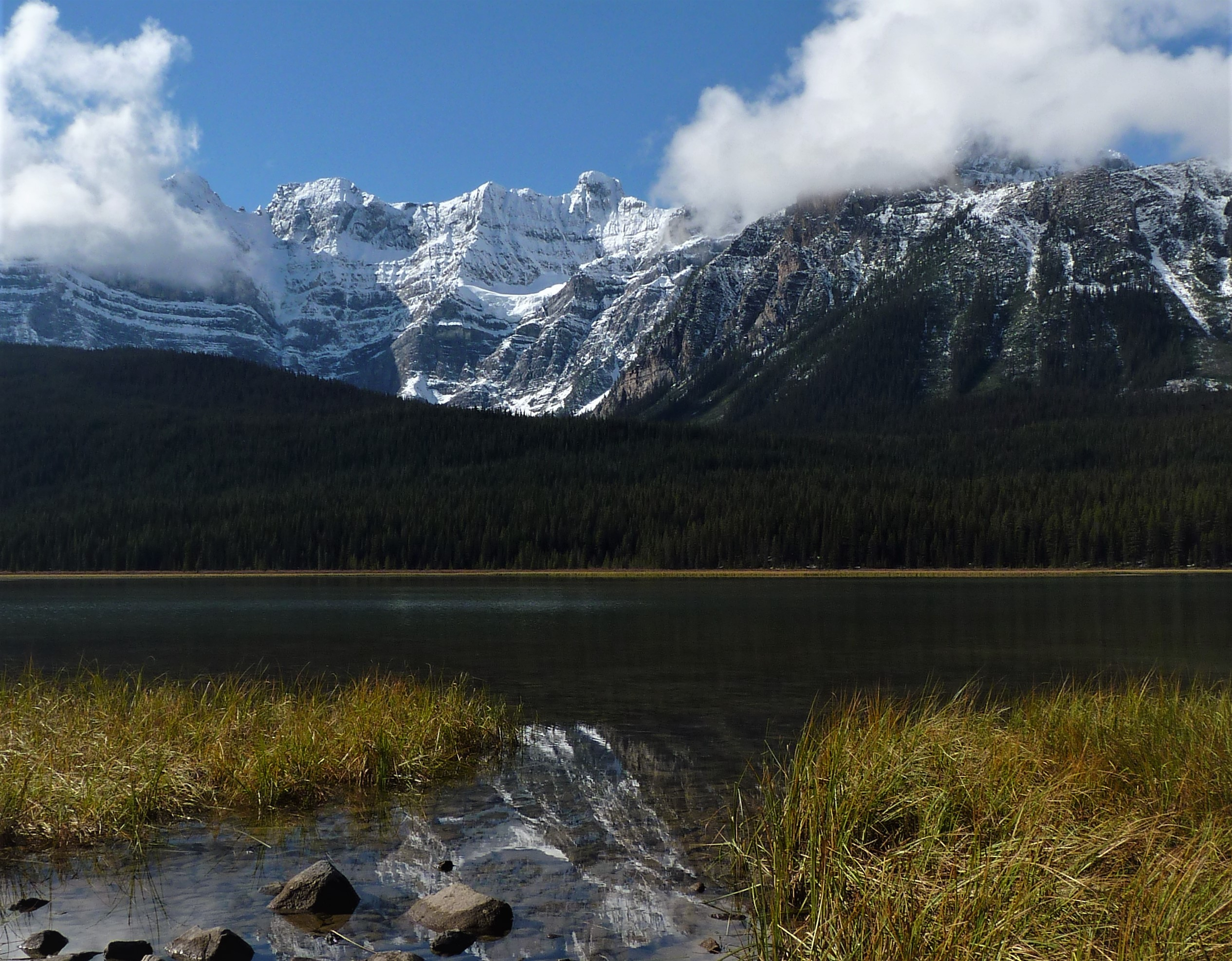
Stairway Peak viewed from Waterfowl Lakes

== See also ==
- List of peaks on the British Columbia–Alberta border
