= Purity Mountain =

Mountain in British Columbia, Canada

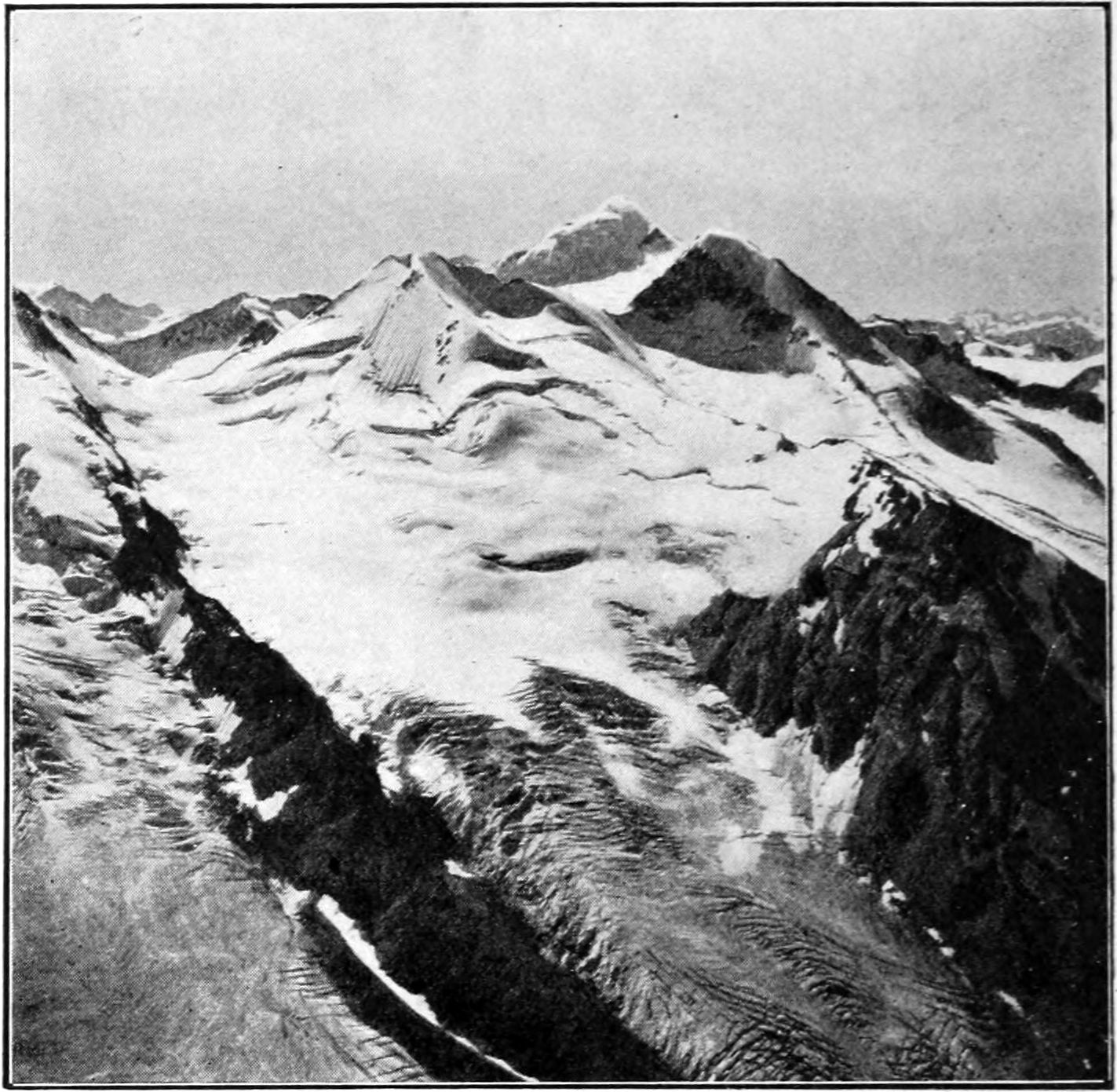
- North aspect, 1912

Highest point
- Elevation: 3,149 m (10,331 ft)
- Prominence: 497 m (1,631 ft)
- Parent peak: Mount Wheeler (3,336 m)
- Isolation: 3.89 km (2.42 mi)
- Listing: Mountains of British Columbia
- Coordinates: 51°05′41″N 117°28′09″W

Geography
- Location within British Columbia Location within Canada
- Interactive map of Purity Mountain
- Country: Canada
- Province: British Columbia
- District: Kootenay Land District
- Protected area: Glacier National Park
- Parent range: Selkirk Mountains; Purity Range
- Topo map: NTS 82N3 Mount Wheeler

Climbing
- First ascent: 1890

Purity Mountain is a 3,149-metre (10,331-foot) summit in British Columbia, Canada.

== Description ==
Purity Mountain is located along the southern boundary of Glacier National Park, and is the westernmost peak of the compact Purity Range, a subrange of the Selkirk Mountains. Purity is an attractive peak surrounded on three sides by névés, with no less than six glaciers radiating from it. On every side there is a wilderness of snow and ice above the rich green forests of the valleys. Precipitation runoff from the mountain drains north into Van Horne Brook, and southeast into Battle Brook which are both tributaries of the Incomappleux River. Purity Mountain is more notable for its steep rise above local terrain than for its absolute elevation. Topographic relief is significant as the summit rises 1,650 m (5,410 ft) above Van Horne Brook in 3 km (1.9 mi).

== History ==
The mountain was named in August 1890 by Harold Ward Topham of the Alpine Club of England who saw it from Donkin Pass. The mountain's toponym was officially adopted on May 29, 1901, by the Geographical Names Board of Canada.

The first ascent of the summit was made in 1890 by Harold Ward Topham, Emil Huber, and Harold Forster.

== Climate ==
Based on the Köppen climate classification, Purity Mountain is located in a subarctic climate zone with cold, snowy winters, and mild summers. Winter temperatures can drop below −20 °C with wind chill factors below −30 °C. This climate supports the Van Horne Névé on the south slope, Odin Glacier on the east slope, and Purity Glacier to the north of the peak.

== See also ==
- Geography of British Columbia
