= Wallace Peak =

Mountain in British Columbia, Canada

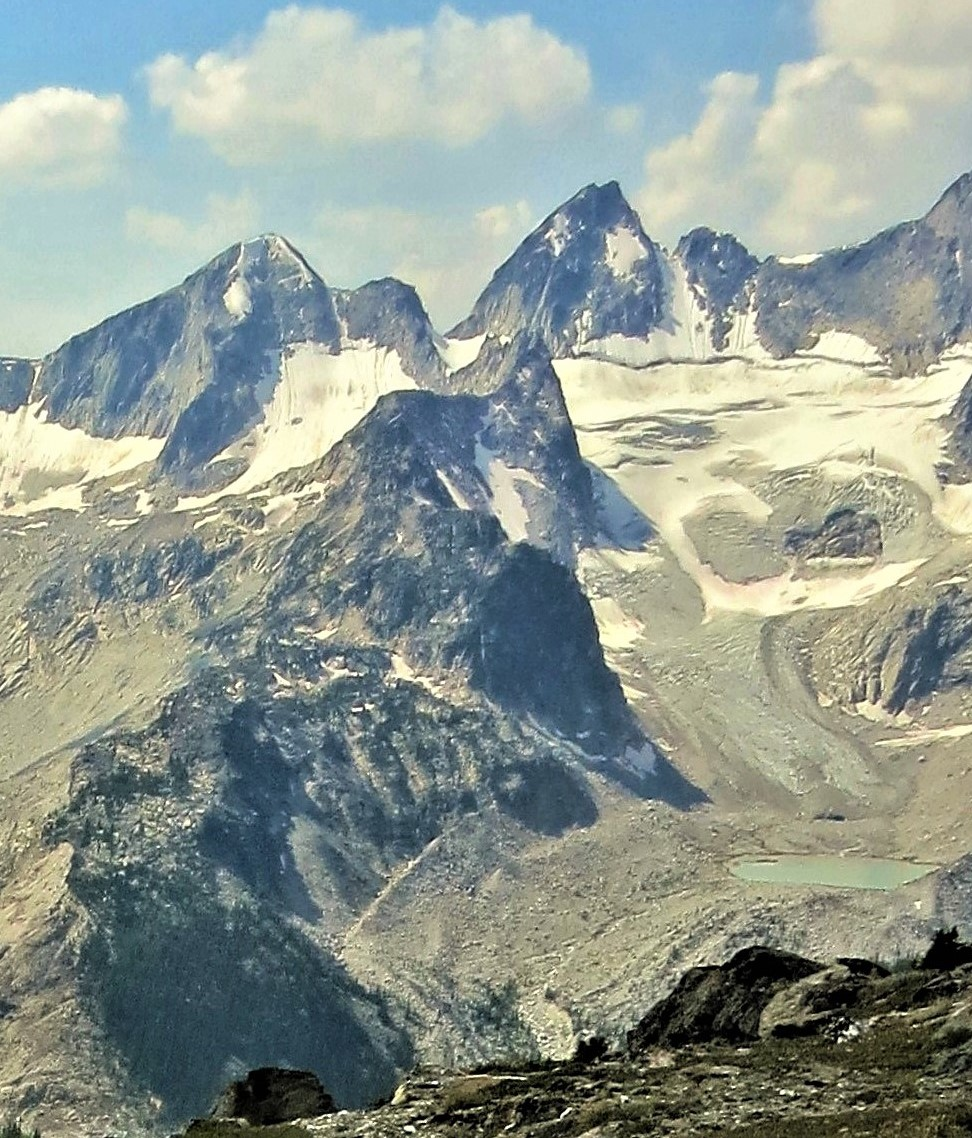
- East aspect

Highest point
- Elevation: 2,940 m (9,646 ft)
- Prominence: 130 m (427 ft)
- Parent peak: Spear Spire (2,983 m)
- Isolation: 0.6 km (0.37 mi)
- Listing: Mountains of British Columbia
- Coordinates: 50°46′05″N 116°48′50″W

Naming
- Etymology: James Nevin Wallace

Geography
- Location within British Columbia Location within Canada
- Interactive map of Wallace Peak
- Country: Canada
- Province: British Columbia
- District: Kootenay Land District
- Protected area: Bugaboo Provincial Park
- Parent range: Purcell Mountains; The Bugaboos
- Topo map: NTS 82K15 Bugaboo Creek

Geology
- Rock age: 135 Million years ago
- Rock type: Granodiorite

Climbing
- First ascent: August 10, 1952

Wallace Peak is a 2,940-metre (9,650-foot) summit in British Columbia, Canada.

== Description ==
Wallace Peak is located in The Bugaboos, at the head of Vowell Creek in Bugaboo Provincial Park. Precipitation runoff from Wallace Peak's east slope drains into the headwaters of Vowell Creek → Bobbie Burns Creek → Spillimacheen River → Columbia River; and from the west slope to Duncan River via East Creek. Wallace Peak is more notable for its steep rise above local terrain than for its absolute elevation as topographic relief is significant with the summit rising over 1,200 meters (3,937 ft) above Vowell Creek in less than 4 km (2.5 mi). The nearest higher neighbor is Mount Kelvin, 0.6 km (0.37 mi) to the north.

== History ==
The first ascent of the summit was made on August 10, 1952, by Peter Robinson, Bob Collins, Bill Briggs, and John Briggs.

The peak was then named by the same Peter Robinson to honor James Nevin Wallace (1870–1941), a prominent Canadian surveyor, historian, and geologist. The toponym was officially adopted on June 9, 1960, by the Geographical Names Board of Canada.

== Climate ==
Based on the Köppen climate classification, Wallace Peak is located in a subarctic climate zone with cold, snowy winters, and mild summers. Winter temperatures can drop below −20 °C with wind chill factors below −30 °C. This climate supports the Vowell Glacier south of the peak and an unnamed glacier on the peak's west slope.

== See also ==
- The Bugaboos
- Geography of British Columbia
