= Mount Ermatinger =

Mountain in the country of Canada

- Location within Alberta Location within British Columbia Location within Canada

Highest point
- Elevation: 3,060 m (10,040 ft)
- Prominence: 264 m (866 ft)
- Parent peak: Mount Oates (3120 m)
- Listing: Mountains of Alberta; Mountains of British Columbia
- Coordinates: 52°25′03″N 118°02′48″W

Geography
- Country: Canada
- Provinces: Alberta and British Columbia
- Protected areas: Jasper National Park; Hamber Provincial Park
- Parent range: Park Ranges
- Topo map: NTS 83D8 Athabasca Pass

Climbing
- First ascent: January 1, 1928 by W.R. Hainsworth, J.G. Hillhouse, M.M. Strumia, J. Monroe Thorington

Mount Ermatinger is located on the border of Alberta and British Columbia, NE of Kinbasket Lake.

== History ==
It was named in 1920 by Arthur O. Wheeler for Edward Ermatinger.

== See also ==
- List of peaks on the British Columbia–Alberta border
- List of mountains in the Canadian Rockies
