= Stein Mountain =

Mountain in British Columbia, Canada

- Location within British Columbia

Highest point
- Elevation: 2,761 m (9,058 ft)
- Prominence: 312 m (1,024 ft)
- Listing: Mountains of British Columbia
- Coordinates: 50°20′21″N 121°45′57″W

Geography
- Country: Canada
- Province: British Columbia
- District: Kamloops Division Yale Land District
- Parent range: Lillooet Ranges
- Topo map: NTS 92I5 Stein River

Stein Mountain, elev. 2761 m (9058 feet), is a mountain in the Lillooet Ranges of southwestern British Columbia, Canada, located northwest of the confluence of the Stein and Fraser Rivers, which is just upstream from the town of Lytton. Its name derives from that of the Stein River.
