= Basement Peak =

Mountain in British Columbia, Canada

- Location within British Columbia
- Interactive map of Basement Peak

Highest point
- Elevation: 2,706 m (8,878 ft)
- Prominence: 1,566 m (5,138 ft)
- Parent peak: Buckwell Peak (2721 m)
- Listing: Mountains of British Columbia
- Coordinates: 59°35′50.0″N 137°16′16.7″W

Geography
- Location: Northern British Columbia
- Parent range: Alsek Ranges
- Topo map: NTS 114P6 Pentice Ridge

Basement Peak is a mountain in British Columbia, Canada, located 24 km (15 mi) northeast of Buckwell Peak and 42 km (26 mi) northeast of Pleasant Camp. The name is not official, and is not recognized by the CGNDB.
