= Mount McCord =

Mountain in Alberta and British Columbia, Canada

- Location within Alberta Location within British Columbia Location within Canada

Highest point
- Elevation: 2,511 m (8,238 ft)
- Prominence: 217 m (712 ft)
- Parent peak: Salient Mountain (2810 m)
- Listing: Mountains of Alberta; Mountains of British Columbia
- Coordinates: 53°02′35″N 118°40′03″W

Geography
- Country: Canada
- Provinces: Alberta and British Columbia
- District: Cariboo Land District
- Protected areas: Jasper National Park; Mount Robson Provincial Park
- Parent range: Park Ranges
- Topo map: NTS 83E2 Resplendent Creek

Mount McCord is located at the northern end of Miette Pass, NE side of Mount Robson Provincial Park on the Continental Divide marking the Alberta-British Columbia border. It was named in 1923 after W.C. McCord, a surveyor who led a Canadian Pacific Railway trail-making party in 1872.

== See also ==
- List of peaks on the Alberta–British Columbia border
