= Mount Dorman =

Mountain in British Columbia, Canada

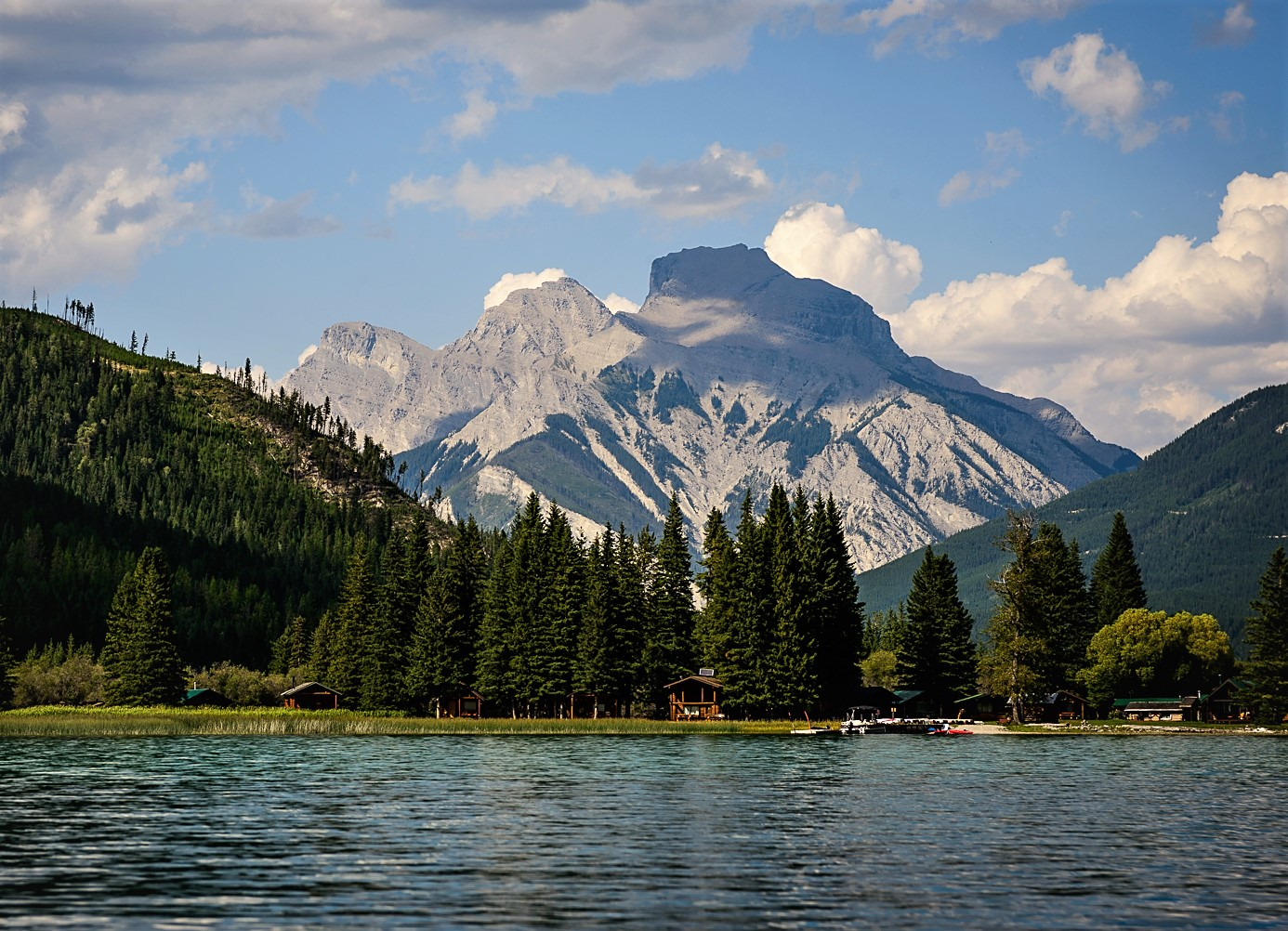
- South aspect, from Whiteswan Lake

Highest point
- Elevation: 2,825 m (9,268 ft)
- Prominence: 605 m (1,985 ft)
- Isolation: 10.46 km (6.50 mi)
- Listing: Mountains of British Columbia
- Coordinates: 50°17′06″N 115°25′39″W

Naming
- Etymology: Bill Dorman

Geography
- Location within British Columbia Location within Canada
- Interactive map of Mount Dorman
- Country: Canada
- Province: British Columbia
- District: Kootenay Land District
- Parent range: Rocky Mountains
- Topo map: NTS 82J6 Mount Abruzzi

Mount Dorman is a 2,825-metre (9,268-foot) mountain summit located in British Columbia, Canada. Precipitation runoff from the mountain drains west to the White River via Elk Creek, principally. Mount Dorman is more notable for its steep rise above local terrain than for its absolute elevation as topographic relief is significant with the summit rising over 1,600 metres (5,200 feet) above Elk Creek in 3 km (1.9 mi).

== Etymology ==
The mountain was presumably named in the mid-1950s by the Forest Service after Bill Dorman, trapper along the nearby White River from the early 1900s through the 1920s. The mountain's toponym was officially adopted March 3, 1960, by the Geographical Names Board of Canada.

== Climate ==
Based on the Köppen climate classification, Mount Dorman is located in a subarctic climate zone with cold, snowy winters, and mild summers. Winter temperatures can drop below −20 °C with wind chill factors below −30 °C.

== See also ==
- Geography of British Columbia
