= Paragon Peak =

Mountain in the country of Canada

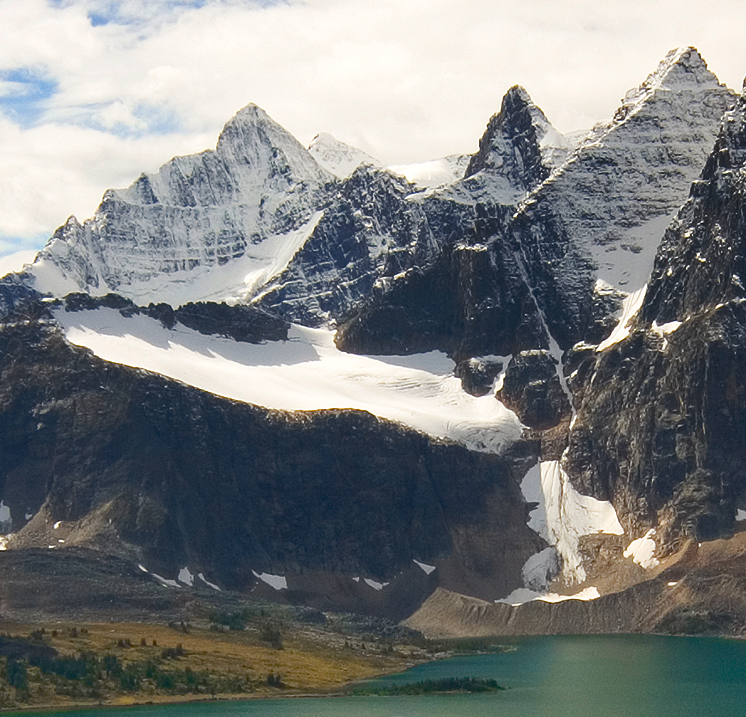
- Paragon Peak farthest to right (Bennington Peak and Parapet Peak to left)

Highest point
- Elevation: 3,030 m (9,940 ft)
- Prominence: 161 m (528 ft)
- Parent peak: Oubliette Mountain (3070 m)
- Listing: Mountains of Alberta; Mountains of British Columbia
- Coordinates: 52°40′29″N 118°17′19″W

Geography
- Location within Alberta Location within British Columbia Location within Canada
- Country: Canada
- Provinces: Alberta and British Columbia
- Parent range: Park Ranges
- Topo map: NTS 83D9 Amethyst Lakes

Climbing
- First ascent: 1919 A. Carpe, Howard Palmer
- Easiest route: East Ridge I

Paragon Peak is located at the southern end of Mount Robson Provincial Park on the border of Alberta and British Columbia in Canada. It was named in 1921 by Howard Palmer.

== See also ==
- List of peaks on the British Columbia–Alberta border
- List of mountains in the Canadian Rockies
