= Mount Poland =

Mountain in the country of Canada

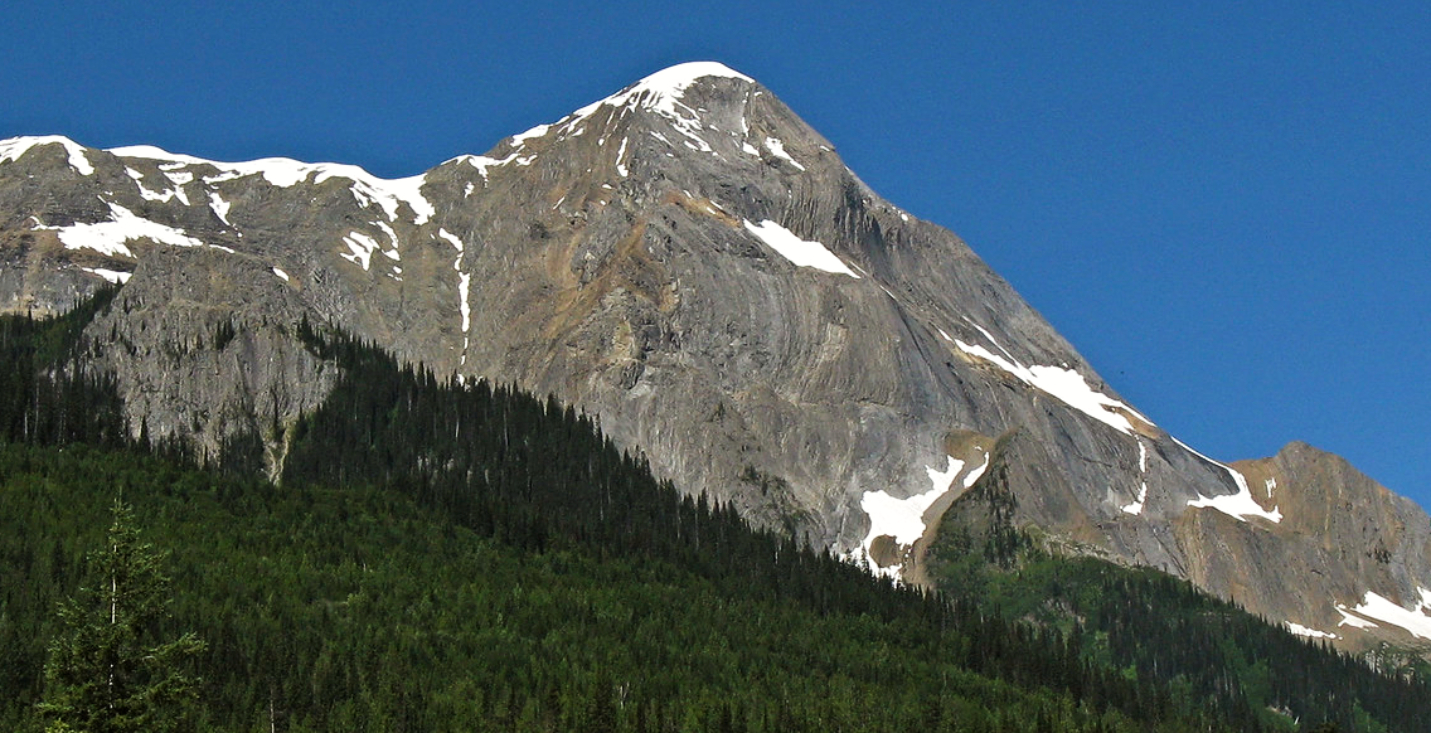
- Mount Poland, east aspect

Highest point
- Elevation: 2,840 m (9,320 ft)
- Prominence: 273 m (896 ft)
- Parent peak: Mount Mummery (3328 m)
- Listing: Mountains of British Columbia
- Coordinates: 51°38′28″N 116°48′17″W

Geography
- Location within British Columbia Location within Canada
- Location: British Columbia, Canada
- District: Kootenay Land District
- Parent range: Park Ranges ← Canadian Rockies
- Topo map: NTS 82N10 Blaeberry River

Geology
- Rock age: Cambrian
- Rock type: Sedimentary

Climbing
- First ascent: 1958

Mount Poland is a 2,853-metre (9,360 ft) mountain summit located in the Canadian Rockies of British Columbia, Canada. The mountain is situated 40 km (25 mi) north of Golden in the Blaeberry Valley, 4 km (2.5 mi) southeast of Mount Mummery. The mountain was named after Canadian Army Private Herbert J. Poland of Golden, BC, who was killed in 1944 World War II action. The mountain's name was officially adopted July 5, 1961, when approved by the Geographical Names Board of Canada. The first ascent of the mountain was made in 1958 by J. Owen, E. Pigou, and guide A. Bitterlich.

== Climate ==
Based on the Köppen climate classification, Mount Poland is located in a subarctic climate with cold, snowy winters, and mild summers. Temperatures can drop below −20 °C with wind chill factors below −30 °C. Precipitation runoff from the mountain drains into Blaeberry River and Waitabit Creek, which are both tributaries of the Columbia River.

== See also ==
- Geology of the Rocky Mountains
- List of mountains in the Canadian Rockies
