= Klowa Mountain =

Mountain in British Columbia, Canada

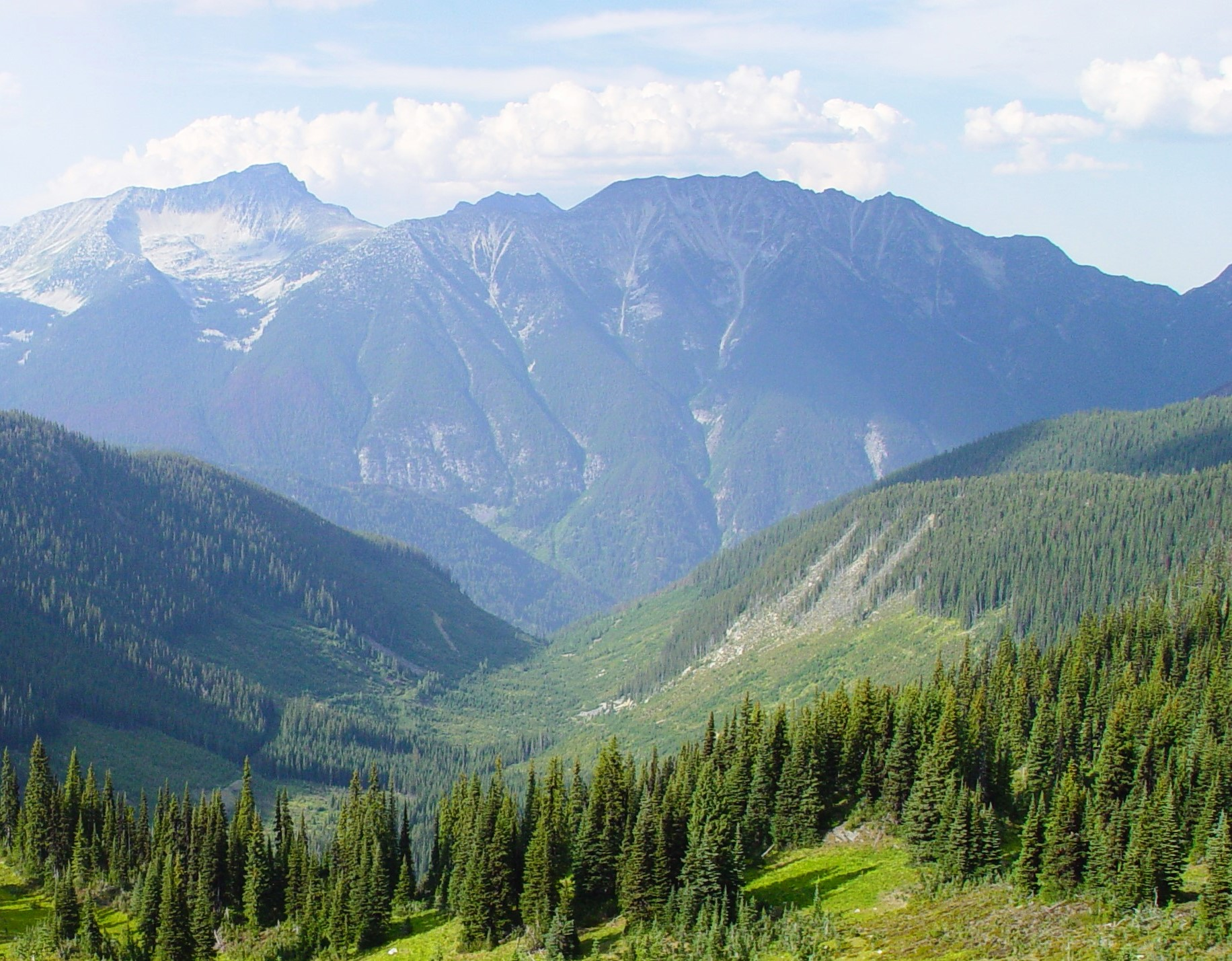
- South aspect of Klowa Mountain (Nikaia Mountain to left)

Highest point
- Elevation: 2,527 m (8,291 ft)
- Prominence: 271 m (889 ft)
- Parent peak: Skihist Mountain (2,968 m)
- Isolation: 2.33 km (1.45 mi)
- Listing: Mountains of British Columbia
- Coordinates: 50°09′52″N 121°41′30″W

Geography
- Location within British Columbia Location within Canada
- Interactive map of Klowa Mountain
- Country: Canada
- Province: British Columbia
- District: Kamloops Division Yale Land District
- Parent range: Lillooet Ranges; Coast Mountains
- Topo map: NTS 92I4 Lytton

Klowa Mountain is a 2,527-metre (8,291-foot) summit in British Columbia, Canada.

== Description ==
Klowa Mountain is located 11 kilometres (6.8 mi) southwest of Lytton in the Lillooet Ranges of the Coast Mountains. Precipitation runoff from the peak's south slope drains to Kwoiek Creek, whereas the north slope drains to Nikaia Creek, and both are tributaries of the nearby Fraser River. Topographic relief is significant as the summit rises 1,725 metres (5,660 ft) above Kwoiek Creek in approximately three kilometres (1.9 mi). The toponym was officially adopted on January 17, 1958, by the Geographical Names Board of Canada and is an indigenous word meaning "green."

== Climate ==
Based on the Köppen climate classification, Klowa Mountain is located in a subarctic climate zone of western North America. Most weather fronts originate in the Pacific Ocean, and travel east toward the Coast Mountains where they are forced upward by the range (orographic lift), causing them to drop their moisture in the form of rain or snowfall. As a result, the Coast Mountains experience high precipitation, especially during the winter months in the form of snowfall. Winter temperatures can drop below −20 °C with wind chill factors below −30 °C. The months July through September offer the most favorable weather for climbing Klowa Mountain.

== See also ==
- Geography of British Columbia
- Cantilever Range
