= List of mountains of British Columbia =

List of mountains of British Columbia is a list of mountains in the Canadian province of British Columbia.

== List of mountains ==
Name	Height (m)	Height (ft)	Range	Remarks
Abbl	2,012	6,601	Misinchinka Ranges	Named for a Canadian soldier killed in WWII
Adamant	3,345	10,974	Selkirk Mountains → Adamant Range	
Addenbroke	1,591	5,220	Pacific Ranges	Discovery Islands archipelago
Adrian	1,870	6,140	Vancouver Island Ranges	
Afton	2,553	8,376	Selkirk Mountains → Duncan Ranges	
Aiguille	2,999	9,839	Waputik Range	Named for French word Aiguille, meaning needle
Akamina	2,600	8,500	Clark Range	
Akasik	2,450	8,040	Lillooet Ranges → Cantilever Range	Name means "leap" or "jump" in the language of the Nlaka'pamux First Nations people
Albert	3,045	9,990	Selkirk Mountains → Duncan Ranges	
Albert	2,552	8,373	Coast Mountains	
Albert Edward	2,093	6,867	Vancouver Island Ranges	
Albreda	3,052	10,013	Monashee Mountains → Malton Range	
Alexis	2,123	6,965	Hart Ranges → Misinchinka Ranges	Named for Canadian soldier killed in World War II
Alcantara	3,029	9,938	Blue Range	
Alfred	2,420	7,940	Pacific Ranges	
Alice	1,798	5,899	Pacific Ranges	Named for Princess Alice
Allen	3,310	10,860	Sundance Range	Part of the Valley of the Ten Peaks
Allison	2,646	8,681	High Rock Range	Named for a law enforcement agent
Alnus	2,968	9,738	Park Ranges	Alnus is Latin name for Alder tree
Alpaca	2,083	6,834	North Cascades	
Alpha	2,302	7,552	Pacific Ranges → Tantalus Range	
Alpha Centauri	3,102	10,177	Purcell Mountains	Named for Alpha Centauri
Ambition	2,953	9,688		
Amicus	2,510	8,230	Coast Mountains	
Anahim	1,897	6,224		
Anarchist	1,491	4,892	Monashee Mountains	
Anchor Cone	647	2,123	Kitimat Ranges → Countess of Dufferin Range	
Anne-Alice	2,941	9,649	Park Ranges	
Anniversary	2,947	9,669	Purcell Mountains → The Bugaboos	
Antimony	2,668	8,753	Lillooet Ranges	
Apex	3,246	10,650	Park Ranges	
Aquila	2,860	9,380	Ottertail Range	Aquila is the Latin term for eagle
Aragorn	2,435	7,989	Coast Mountains → Cadwallader Range	
Archduke	3,135	10,285	Purcell Mountains	
Argus	1,994	6,542	Vancouver Island Ranges	Named after newspaper whose editor attempted the mountain in 1931
Aries Peak	3,012	9,882	Waputik Mountains	Named for the sheep found on its slopes
Armour	2,674	8,773	Saint Elias Mountains	Named for a Chief Justice of Canada
Armstrong	2,823	9,262	High Rock Range	Named for Canadian soldier killed in WWI
Arras	3,090	10,140	Canadian Rockies	
Arrowhead	2,185	7,169	Lillooet Ranges	
Arrowsmith	1,819	5,968	Vancouver Island Ranges	
Arthur Meighen	3,205	10,515	Cariboo Mountains → Premier Range	Named for ninth PM of Canada
Asgard	2,825	9,268	Selkirk Mountains → Valhalla Ranges	
Ashlu	2,561	8,402	Elaho Jervis Divide → Pacific Ranges	
Asperity	3,723	12,215	Pacific Ranges → Waddington Range	
Assiniboine	3,618	11,870	Canadian Rockies	
Atlin	2,046	6,713	Coast Mountains	
Atna	2,724	8,937	Howson Range	
Aurora	2,790	9,150	Blue Range	
Austerity	3,337	10,948	Selkirk Mountains → Adamant Range	
Avalanche	2,861	9,386	Selkirk Mountains → Duncan Ranges	
Aye	3,243	10,640	Park Ranges	On the Continental Divide
Ayesha	3,065	10,056	Waputik Mountains	
Aylesworth	2,830	9,280	Saint Elias Mountains	Named for a Canadian lawyer
Azu	1,648	5,407	Hart Ranges → Misinchinka Ranges	Named for nearby lake
Baby Munday	2,250	7,380	Cheam Range	
Bagot	2,181	7,156	Coast Mountains	Named for Charles Bagot
Baker	3,180	10,430	Waputik Mountains	
Baldface	1,798	5,899	Chilcotin Plateau	Volcanic cone
Ball	3,311	10,863	Ball Range	Highest peak in the range
Barbette	3,072	10,079	Waputik Mountains	
Barbour	2,290	7,510	Coast Mountains	
Barlow	3,120	10,240	Park Ranges	Named for a GSC cartographer who died in a maritime disaster
Barnard (Canada)	3,339	10,955	Park Ranges	Named for a Lt. Governor of B.C.
Barnard (Canada/USA)	2,491	8,173	Alsek Ranges	
Basement	2,706	8,878	Alsek Ranges	
Bastion	2,994	9,823	Park Ranges	
Battisti	3,155	10,351	The Italian Group	
Battle	2,369	7,772	Monashee Mountains → Shuswap Highland	
Bayard	1,999	6,558	Coast Mountains → Boundary Ranges	
Beartooth	1,903	6,243	Coast Mountains	
Beatrice	3,125	10,253	Ball Range	
Beatty	3,004	9,856	Park Ranges	
Beaver	3,212	10,538	Selkirk Mountains → Battle Range	
Begbie	2,733	8,967	Monashee Mountains → Gold Range	
Bell	3,269	10,725	Pacific Ranges → Waddington Range	
Bennington	3,260	10,700	Park Ranges	
Benson	1,023	3,356	Vancouver Island Ranges	
Bennington	3,260	10,700	Park Ranges	
Benvolio	2,613	8,573	Garibaldi Ranges → Fitzsimmons Range	
Bess	3,203	10,509	Front Ranges	
Big Snow	2,357	7,733	Coast Mountains	
Big White	2,315	7,595	Okanagan Highland	
Birkenhead	2,506	8,222	Coast Mountains	
Bishop	2,850	9,350	Elk Range	
Blackhorn	3,022	9,915	Coast Mountains → Niut Range	
Black Prince	2,742	8,996	Selkirk Mountains → Valhalla Ranges	
Blanshard	1,550	5,090	Garibaldi Ranges	
Bolton	2,706	8,878	High Rock Range	Named for Canadian soldier killed in World War I
Bonny	3,100	10,200	Selkirk Mountains → Duncan Ranges	
Boom	2,760	9,060	Bow Range	Named after Boom Lake
Boswell	2,454	8,051	Border Ranges	
Botanie	2,077	6,814	Clear Range	
Boucherie	758	2,487		
Bravo	3,105	10,187	Pacific Ranges → Waddington Range	
Breaker	3,058	10,033	Waputik Range	
Brown	2,791	9,157	Canadian Rockies	
Bryce	3,507	11,506	Canadian Rockies	
Bullock	629	2,064	Pacific Ranges	
Bulyea	3,332	10,932	Park Ranges	Named after first Lieutenant-Governor of Alberta
Burgess	2,599	8,527	Canadian Rockies	
Burnham	2,869	9,413	Monashee Mountains → Gold Range	
Burwell	1,541	5,056	Pacific Ranges → North Shore Mountains	
Bute	2,810	9,220	Coast Mountains	
Butters	3,141	10,305	Selkirk Mountains → Battle Range	
Cairnes	3,081	10,108	Canadian Rockies	
Cambrai	3,165	10,384	Park Ranges	Named for Battle of Cambrai (1917)
Canadian Border	2,291	7,516	North Cascades	
Canoe Mountain	2,651	8,698	Malton Range	
Capilano	1,692	5,551	Britannia Range	Named for a Squamish Chief
Carcajou	2,239	7,346	Coast Mountains → McBride Range	
Carnarvon	3,046	9,993	Waputik Mountains → President Range	
Carr	2,590	8,500	Coast Mountains	
Cartier	2,610	8,560	Selkirk Mountains → Duncan Ranges	
Castle	2,546	8,353	Flathead Range	
Catamount	2,733	8,967	Selkirk Mountains → Hermit Range	
Cathedral	3,189	10,463	Canadian Rockies	
Cathedral	1,737	5,699	North Shore Mountains	
Cautley	2,880	9,450	Park Ranges	Named for a surveyor
Cayley	2,385	7,825	Pacific Ranges	
Cayoosh	2,561	8,402	Lillooet Ranges → Cayoosh Range	
Celeste	2,045	6,709	Vancouver Island Ranges	
Centre	2,601	8,533	Flathead Range	
Chaba	3,212	10,538	Park Ranges	Chaba is the Nakoda word for beaver
Chancellor	3,266	10,715	Park Ranges → Ottertail Range	
Chatsquot	2,365	7,759	Coast Mountains → Kitimat Ranges	
Cheakamus	2,588	8,491	Garibaldi Ranges → Fitzsimmons Range	
Cheops	2,581	8,468	Selkirk Mountains → Hermit Range	
Chief Pascall	2,206	7,238	Pacific Ranges → Lillooet Ranges	
Chikoida	1,927	6,322	Taku Plateau	
Chimney	3,002	9,849	Bow Range	Named for chimney feature on climbing route
Chisel	3,046	9,993	Park Ranges	
Christian	3,406	11,175	Park Ranges	Named for Swiss mountain guide
Churchill	1,996	6,549	Coast Mountains	
Chutine	2,910	9,550	Coast Mountains → Boundary Ranges	
Cinnamon	2,727	8,947	Park Ranges	
Cirque	2,531	8,304	Lillooet Ranges → Cayoosh Range	
Clague	1,349	4,426	Coast Mountains → Kitimat Ranges	
Claimpost	2,671	8,763	Lillooet Ranges	
Clairvaux	2,690	8,830	Park Ranges	French word meaning "clear valleys"
Clemenceau	3,664	12,021	Park Ranges	
Cloudburst	1,871	6,138	Coast Mountains	
Cloudraker	2,385	7,825	Coast Mountains	
Collie	3,143	10,312	Waputik Mountains	
Colonel Foster	2,134	7,001	Vancouver Island Ranges → Elk River Mountains	
Coliseum	1,401	4,596	Pacific Ranges → North Shore Mountains	Subpeak of Mt. Burwell
Columbia	3,747	12,293	Park Ranges → Winston Churchill Range	
Combatant	3,762	12,343	Waddington Range	
Commander	3,371	11,060	Purcell Mountains	
Cond	2,801	9,190	Columbia Mountains	
Conrad	3,279	10,758	Purcell Mountains	
Conway	3,098	10,164	Park Ranges	Named for a British mountaineer
Cook	2,676	8,780	Garibaldi Ranges	
Cooper	3,094	10,151	Selkirk Mountains → Slocan Ranges	
Copeland	2,556	8,386	Monashee Mountains	Named for English astronomer
Cordonnier	3,012	9,882	Park Ranges	Named for a French army general
Corrie	2,263	7,425	Coast Mountains	
Côté	2,391	7,844	Front Ranges	Named for a Canadian politician
Courcelette	3,044	9,987	High Rock Range	Named for Courcelette, France where a WWI battle took place
Crossover	2,175	7,136	North Cascades → Skagit Range	
Cronin	2,396	7,861	Babine Range	
Crown	1,504	4,934	Pacific Ranges → North Shore Mountains	North Vancouver
Crown	1,846	6,056	Vancouver Island Ranges → Elk River Mountains	Vancouver Island
Crysdale	2,427	7,963	Hart Ranges → Misinchinka Ranges	
Cypress	2,083	6,834	Pacific Ranges	
Darling	2,310	7,580	Coast Mountains	
Darrah	2,755	9,039	Flathead Range	Named for an astronomer
Davidson	2,516	8,255	Garibaldi Ranges	
Deception	2,233	7,326	Coast Mountains	
Decker	2,421	7,943	Garibaldi Ranges → Spearhead Range	
Deltaform	3,424	11,234	Park Ranges → Bow Range	
Deluge	2,789	9,150	Purcell Mountains	
Dennis	2,549	8,363	Park Ranges	
Dent	3,267	10,719	Park Ranges	Named after an English mountaineer
Denver	2,746	9,009	Selkirk Mountains → Valhalla Ranges	
Deserters	2,274	7,461	Muskwa Ranges	
Devils Couch	2,749	9,019	Selkirk Mountains → Valhalla Ranges	
Devils Dome	2,769	9,085	Selkirk Mountains → Valhalla Ranges	
Devils Paw	2,616	8,583	Coast Mountains → Boundary Ranges	
Diavolo	2,569	8,428	Garibaldi Ranges → Fitzsimmons Range	
Dieppe	2,853	9,360	Muskwa Ranges	
Dione	2,589	8,494	Pacific Ranges → Tantalus Range	
Donkin	2,940	9,650	Selkirk Mountains	
Doom	787	2,582	Refugium Range	
Dorman	2,825	9,268	Rocky Mountains	
Douai	3,120	10,240	Park Ranges	Named for a village in France
Doubletop	2,667	8,750	Selkirk Mountains → Adamant Range	
Downie	2,926	9,600	Selkirk Mountains	
Drinnan	2,584	8,478	Selkirk Mountains → Valhalla Ranges	
Drysdale	2,932	9,619	Vermilion Range	
Duchesnay	2,927	9,603	Park Ranges → Bow Range	
Duffey	2,219	7,280	Lillooet Ranges → Joffre Group	
Duke	2,379	7,805	Pacific Ranges → Lillooet Ranges	
Duncan	3,202	10,505	Selkirk Mountains → Battle Range	
Dungeon	3,129	10,266	Park Ranges	
Dunn	2,636	8,648	Columbia Mountains	
Eagle	2,846	9,337	Selkirk Mountains → Duncan Ranges	
Earl Grey	3,149	10,331	Purcell Mountains	
Eaton	2,117	6,946	North Cascades → Skagit Range	
Eden	3,180	10,430	Park Ranges	
Edziza	2,780	9,120	Tahltan Highland	
El Piveto	1,960	6,430	Vancouver Island Ranges	
Eliza	2,954	9,692	Fairweather Range	
Elkhorn	2,194	7,198	Vancouver Island Ranges → Elk River Mountains	
Elliott	1,557	5,108	Vancouver Island Ranges	
Emerald	2,566	8,419	Waputik Mountains → President Range	
Emperor	3,127	10,259	Purcell Mountains	
English	2,680	8,790	Monashee Mountains → Gold Range	
Ennis	3,122	10,243	Park Ranges → Ottertail Range	Named for the manager of a shipping line
Ermatinger	3,060	10,040	Park Ranges	
Ernest	3,498	11,476	Park Ranges	Highest peak of Mt. Lyell
Ethelbert	3,176	10,420	Purcell Mountains	
Etherington	2,877	9,439	High Rock Range	
Evans	2,250	7,380	Coast Mountains	
Evans	1,132	3,714	Garibaldi Ranges	
Exploration	2,665	8,743	Battle of Britain Range	
Extinguisher Tower	2,433	7,982	Rainbow Range	
Eyebrow	3,362	11,030	Purcell Mountains	
Face	2,485	8,153	Coast Mountains	
Fairmont	2,628	8,622	Kootenay Ranges	
Fairweather	4,671	15,325	Saint Elias Mountains → Fairweather Range	Highest summit in British Columbia
Farnham	3,493	11,460	Purcell Mountains – Farnham Group	
Farquhar	1,679	5,509	Coast Mountains	King Island High Point
Farrow	2,890	9,480	Coast Mountains	
Fay	3,235	10,614	Bow Range	
Field	2,643	8,671	Waputik Mountains → President Range	
Finlayson	419	1,375	Vancouver Island Ranges → Gowlland Range	
Fisher	2,843	9,327	Hughes Range	
Fissile Peak	2,439	8,002	Garibaldi Ranges → Fitzsimmons Range	
Fitzsimmons	2,603	8,540	Garibaldi Ranges → Fitzsimmons Range	
Fitzwilliam	2,901	9,518	Continental Ranges → Park Ranges	
Flattop	3,063	10,049	Purcell Mountains → The Bugaboos	
Floe	3,006	9,862	Vermilion Range	
Foch	3,194	10,479	Park Ranges	On the Continental Divide
Forddred	2,169	7,116	North Cascades → Skagit Range	
Forde	2,098	6,883	Saint Elias Mountains → Fairweather Range	
Foremast	2,697	8,848	Selkirk Mountains → Battle Range	
Forger	2,423	7,949	Coast Mountains → McBride Range	
Forget	2,121	6,959	Front Ranges	Named for a Canadian politician
Forum	2,415	7,923	Border Ranges	Named for lake at its base
Foster	3,204	10,512	Vermilion Range	
Fox	2,973	9,754	Park Ranges	Named for an English engineer
Fox	3,196	10,486	Selkirk Mountains	Named for an English adventurer
Fraser	3,322	10,899	Park Ranges	Named for explorer of British Columbia
Freshfield	3,336	10,945	Park Ranges	Named for a British climber
Fresnoy	3,240	10,630	Park Ranges	Named for a village in France
Fromme	1,185	3,888	Pacific Ranges → North Shore Mountains	
Frosty	2,426	7,959	North Cascades → Hozameen Range	
Fusilier	2,747	9,012	Tower of London Range	
Gamuza	1,944	6,378	North Cascades	
Gandalf	2,391	7,844	Coast Mountains → Cadwallader Range	
Gardiner	2,406	7,894	Lillooet Ranges → Cayoosh Range	
Garibaldi	2,678	8,786	Garibaldi Ranges	
Garnet	2,876	9,436	Cariboo Mountains	
Geikie	3,298	10,820	The Ramparts	
Gemse	1,890	6,200	North Cascades	
Gentian	2,197	7,208	Coast Mountains	
George V	1,884	6,181	Vancouver Island Ranges	
Ghost	3,203	10,509	Park Ranges	
Ghost	2,500	8,200	Selkirk Mountains → Duncan Ranges	
Gilgit	3,090	10,140	Park Ranges	Named for Gilgit, Pakistan
Gimli	2,744	9,003	Selkirk Mountains → Valhalla Ranges	
Gimli Peak	2,806	9,206	Selkirk Mountains → Valhalla Ranges	
Glacier	3,302	10,833	Park Ranges	Named for glacier on north side
Gladsheim	2,830	9,280	Selkirk Mountains → Valhalla Ranges	
Gloria	2,908	9,541	Park Ranges	Named for lake on northern side
Goat (Vancouver)	1,401	4,596	Pacific Ranges → Howe Sound Group	
Goat	2,473	8,114	Coast Mountains	
Golden Hinde	2,195	7,201	Vancouver Island Ranges	highest summit of Vancouver Island
Good Hope	3,242	10,636	Pacific Ranges	
Goodsir	3,567	11,703	Park Ranges → Ottertail Range	
Gordon	3,161	10,371	Wapta Icefield → Waputik Range	
Gorman	2,380	7,810	Northern Rocky Mountains	Named for a DLS surveyor
Grant	2,180	7,150	North Cascades → Skagit Range	
Gray	2,886	9,469	Vermilion Range	
Green	2,692	8,832	Selkirk Mountains → Duncan Ranges	
Gregorio	2,605	8,547	Selkirk Mountains → Valhalla Ranges	
Grenelle	3,047	9,997	Pacific Ranges → Waddington Range	
Grimface	2,635	8,645	North Cascades → Okanogan Range	
Grizzly	2,754	9,035	Selkirk Mountains → Hermit Range	
Grouse	1,231	4,039	Pacific Ranges → North Shore Mountains	
Guanaco	2,127	6,978	North Cascades	
Guard	2,177	7,142	Coast Mountains	
Habel	3,073	10,082	Waputik Mountains	Named for a German geographer
Habrich	1,792	5,879	North Shore Mountains	
Hagen	2,635	8,645	Park Ranges	
Hagwilget	2,076	6,811	Hazelton Mountains → Rocher Déboulé Range	
Haiduk	2,920	9,580	Ball Range	
Haig	2,610	8,560	Clark Range	Named for a British astronomer
Hall	3,048	10,000	Purcell Mountains	Named for soldier killed in World War II
Handcar	2,338	7,671	Pacific Ranges	
Hanover	1,748	5,735	Britannia Range	
Harkin	2,979	9,774	Mitchell Range	
Hartzell	2,615	8,579	Lillooet Ranges → Joffre Group	
Hatfield	2,227	7,306	North Cascades → Hozameen Range	
Haynon	2,493	8,179	Lillooet Ranges	
Helen	2,549	8,363	Muskwa Ranges	
Helmcken	328	1,076	Vancouver Island Ranges	
Helmer	3,030	9,940	Park Ranges	Named for father and son killed in World War I
Helmet	318	1,043	Kitimat Ranges	
Hermit	3,050	10,010	Selkirk Mountains → Hermit Range	
Hermitage	2,313	7,589	Tower of London Range	
Hewitt	3,066	10,059	Vermilion Range	
Hkusam	1,671	5,482	Vancouver Island Ranges → Prince of Wales Range	
Holcroft	2,713	8,901	High Rock Range	Named for soldier killed in World War I
Hoodoo	1,850	6,070	Coast Mountains → Boundary Ranges	
Hooker	3,287	10,784	Park Ranges	Named for an English botanist
Horribilis	2,654	8,707	Pacific Ranges	
Hosmer	2,500	8,200	Front Ranges	
Houdini Needles	2,663	8,737	Selkirk Mountains → Adamant Range	
Hour	2,329	7,641	Coast Mountains	
Howard	2,551	8,369	Lillooet Ranges → Joffre Group	
Howse	3,295	10,810	Waputik Mountains	
Howser Peak	3,094	10,151	Purcell Mountains → The Bugaboos	
Howser Spire	3,412	11,194	Purcell Mountains → The Bugaboos	Highest in the Bugaboos range
Howson	2,759	9,052	Hazelton Mountains → Howson Range	
Huber	3,348	10,984	Park Ranges → Bow Range	
Hudson Bay	2,589	8,494	Hazelton Mountains → Bulkley Ranges	
Hugh Neave	2,829	9,281	Cariboo Mountains	
Hungabee	3,492	11,457	Park Ranges → Bow Range	
Hunter	2,032	6,667	Hart Ranges → Murray Range	
Hurd	3,000	9,800	Park Ranges → Ottertail Range	Named for a CPR engineer
Ibex	2,039	6,690	North Cascades	
Ice	2,526	8,287	Tahltan Highland	
Iceberg	1,982	6,503	Vancouver Island Ranges	
Icecap	2,435	7,989	Coast Mountains	
Icefall	3,195	10,482	Park Ranges	
Ida	3,192	10,472	Hart Ranges	
Indian	2,992	9,816	Mitchell Range	
In-SHUCK-ch	2,386	7,828	Coast Mountains	
International	3,099	10,167	Purcell Mountains	
Intersection	2,452	8,045	Front Ranges	Intersection where BC/Alberta border diverges from 120th Meridian
Ipsoot	2,576	8,451	Coast Mountains	
Isabelle	2,934	9,626	Ball Range	
Isolated	2,845	9,334	Waputik Mountains	
Isosceles	2,488	8,163	Coast Mountains	
Jackass	2,006	6,581	North Cascades	
James Turner	2,703	8,868	Garibaldi Ranges	Named for a pioneer minister
Jimmy Jimmy	2,208	7,244	Pacific Ranges	
Joffre	3,450	11,320	Elk Range	
Joffre	2,721	8,927	Lillooet Ranges → Joffre Group	
John Oliver	3,123	10,246	Premier Range	
Jubilee	2,751	9,026	Pacific Ranges → Waddington Range	
Judge Howay	2,262	7,421	Pacific Ranges	
Jumbo	3,437	11,276	Purcell Mountains	
Kain	2,863	9,393	Park Ranges → Rainbow Range	
Karnak	3,411	11,191	Purcell Mountains	
Kates Needle	3,053	10,016	Coast Mountains → Boundary Ranges	
Kimsquit Peak	2,268	7,441	Coast Mountains → Kitimat Ranges	
Kindersley	2,697	8,848	Kootenay Ranges	
King	2,868	9,409	Park Ranges → Van Horne Range	
King Albert	2,987	9,800	Park Ranges	Named for King Albert of Belgium
King Edward	3,490	11,450	Park Ranges → Columbia Icefield	
King Edward	2,789	9,150	Flathead Range	
Kings	2,061	6,762	Vancouver Island Ranges → Elk River Mountains	
King George	3,413	11,198	The Royal Group	
Kispiox	2,096	6,877	Hazelton Mountains → Kispiox Range	
K'iyán Mountain	2,107	6,913	Tagish Highland	
Klapperhorn	2,301	7,549	Selwyn Range	
Klowa	2,527	8,291	Lillooet Ranges → Cantilever Range	Indigenous name means "green"
Knight	2,235	7,333	Cheam Range	
Kumkan	2,742	8,996	Lillooet Ranges	
Kwoiek Needle	2,625	8,612	Lillooet Ranges	Kwoiek is a Thompson Indian word meaning "gouged out"
Kwoiek Peak	2,736	8,976	Lillooet Ranges	
Lambe	3,182	10,440	Park Ranges	Named for a Canadian palaeontologist
Laussedat	3,052	10,013	Park Ranges	
Lavender	2,306	7,566	Coast Mountains → Boundary Ranges	
La Coulotte Peak	2,438	7,999	Flathead Range	
La Coulotte Ridge	2,438	7,999	Flathead Range	Named for area in France where Canadian troops fought in WWI
Lefroy	3,423	11,230	Park Ranges → Bow Range	Named for an English astronomer
Leman	2,730	8,960	Park Ranges	Named for Belgian General of WWI
Leval	2,713	8,901	Blue Range	Named for lawyer who represented Edith Cavell in her WWI trial
Lester Pearson	3,086	10,125	Cariboo Mountains → Premier Range	Named for fourteenth PM of Canada
Level	2,190	7,190	Nahlin Plateau	Includes the Level Mountain Range
Limestone	2,878	9,442	Vermilion Range	
Lindeman	2,312	7,585	Cascade Range	
Little	3,134	10,282	Bow Range	Named for member of the first ascent party
Lloyd George	2,938	9,639	Muskwa Ranges	Named for British Prime Minister
Locomotive	2,340	7,680	Pacific Ranges	
Lodge	3,215	10,548	Fairweather Range	
Loki	2,779	9,117	Purcell Mountains	
Longworth	2,091	6,860	McGregor Range	
Loomis	2,798	9,180	Elk Range	Named for Canadian army general who served in World War I
Low	3,090	10,140	Park Ranges	Named for a Canadian geologist
Lowe	2,194	7,198	Whitemantle Range	
Lucifer	2,726	8,944	Selkirk Mountains → Valhalla Ranges	
Luna	2,470	8,100	Pacific Ranges	Named for Luna, goddess of the Moon in Roman mythology
Lunette	3,428	11,247	Park Ranges	Directly SE of Mount Assiniboine
Lyall	2,950	9,680	High Rock Range	Named for a Scottish botanist
Lydia	2,100	6,900	Pacific Ranges → Tantalus Range	Named for Lydia in Greek mythology
Lyell	3,498	11,476	Central Icefields	Consists of five distinct peaks
Lynx	3,192	10,472	Rainbow Range	Named for Lynx bones found on nearby Coleman Glacier
Macbeth	2,639	8,658	Garibaldi Ranges → Spearhead Range	Named to commemorate the 400th anniversary of William Shakespeare's birth
Macdonald	2,883	9,459	Selkirk Mountains → Duncan Ranges	
Macduff	3,009	9,872	Purcell Mountains → MacBeth Group	
MacFarlane	2,090	6,860	North Cascades → Skagit Range	
Machray	2,749	9,019	Park Ranges	Named for an American bishop
Mackenzie	2,461	8,074	Selkirk Mountains → Duncan Ranges	
Mackenzie King	3,234	10,610	Cariboo Mountains → Premier Range	Named for tenth PM of Canada
Maclaren	2,843	9,327	High Rock Range	Named for a general of the Canadian army in World War I
Macleod	2,176	7,139	North Cascades → Hozameen Range	
Macoun	3,030	9,940	Selkirk Mountains → Duncan Ranges	Named for Canadian botanist
Macpherson	2,427	7,963	Monashee Mountains → Gold Range	Named for Canadian businessman/politician
Mainmast	2,863	9,393	Selkirk Mountains → Battle Range	
Maple	506	1,660	Vancouver Island Ranges	
Marmot	2,103	6,900	North Cascades → Skagit Range	
Matheson	292	958	Vancouver Island Ranges	
Matier	2,783	9,131	Lillooet Ranges → Joffre Group	Highest peak of the Joffre Group
McArthur	3,021	9,911	Wapta Icefield → Park Ranges	Named for Canadian surveyor/mountaineer
McBride	2,083	6,834	Vancouver Island Ranges	Named for Canadian politician
McCord	2,511	8,238	Park Ranges	Named for a surveyor
McGladrey	2,638	8,655	Flathead Range	
McGuire	2,008	6,588	North Cascades → Skagit Range	
McHarg	2,888	9,475	Spray Mountains	Named for Canadian army officer killed in WWI
McKirdy	2,586	8,484	Selwyn Range	
McLean	2,427	7,963	Coast Mountains	
McNair	1,784	5,853	Lillooet Ranges	
McNaughton	2,905	9,531	Park Ranges	Named for Margaret McNaughton
McPhail	2,886	9,469	Elk Range	Named for Canadian soldier killed in WWI
Meager	2,650	8,690	Pacific Ranges	Site of a 2010 landslide
Merrick	1,749	5,738	Solitude Range	Named for a Canadian soldier killed in WWII
Meslilloet	1,990	6,530	Coast Mountains	
Mica	2,855	9,367	Cariboo Mountains	
Michael	2,701	8,862	Waputik Mountains → President Range	
Midgard	2,807	9,209	Selkirk Mountains → Valhalla Ranges	
Milburn	2,019	6,624	Hart Ranges → Murray Range	Named for Canadian pilot killed in WWII
Mistaya	3,078	10,098	Waputik Mountains	
Moby Dick	3,154	10,348	Selkirk Mountains → Battle Range	
Moe	2,664	8,740	Coast Mountains	
Monica	3,072	10,079	Purcell Mountains	Named after mother of a member of the first ascent party
Monarch	3,555	11,663	Pacific Ranges	
Monmouth	3,182	10,440	Pacific Ranges	
Moresby	1,164	3,819	Queen Charlotte Mountains	Highest summit of Moresby Island and the Queen Charlotte Islands
Morkill	2,286	7,500	Front Ranges	Named for a BC land surveyor
Muir	2,758	9,049	High Rock Range	Named for Canadian poet/songwriter
Muir (Vancouver Island)	880	2,890		
Mumm	2,962	9,718	Park Ranges	Named for English mountaineer who completed FA
Mummery	3,331	10,928	Park Ranges → Freshfield Icefield Ranges	Named for Albert F. Mummery who died on Nanga Parbat in 1895
Munday	3,356	11,010	Pacific Ranges → Waddington Range	Named for first ascent party
Nadina	2,111	6,926	Nechako Plateau	Nadina means "standing up alone" in the Babine-Witsuwitʼen language
Nahlin	1,972	6,470	Interior Mountains	
Nanga Parbat	3,240	10,630	Park Ranges	Named for Nanga Parbat
Narao	2,974	9,757	Bow Range	
Nasswald	3,042	9,980	Park Ranges	Named for a town in Austria
Nautilus	3,130	10,270	Selkirk Mountains → Battle Range	
Neal	2,552	8,373	Coast Mountains	
Needle	2,095	6,873	North Cascades	
Nelles	2,531	8,304	Coast Mountains → Boundary Ranges → Juneau Icefield	Named for Canadian Engineer
Nelson	3,313	10,869	Purcell Mountains	Named for a British naval officer
Nemo	2,901	9,518	Selkirk Mountains → Battle Range	
Neptuak	3,233	10,607	Bow Range	Part of the Valley of the Ten Peaks
Nestor	2,972	9,751	Mitchell Range	Named for a World War I destroyer
Niles	2,967	9,734	Waputik Range	Named for American Geology professor
Niobe	2,021	6,631	Pacific Ranges → Tantalus Range	Named for Niobe in Greek mythology
Nivalis	2,569	8,428	Coast Mountains → McBride Range	
Nivelle	3,256	10,682	Park Ranges	Named for a French general of World War I
Noel	2,541	8,337	Pacific Ranges	Named for local prospectors
Normandy	2,849	9,347	Muskwa Ranges	Named for Allied invasion at Normandy in WW II
North Albert	2,934	9,626	Selkirk Mountains → Duncan Ranges	
Northover	3,048	10,000	Park Ranges	Named for Canadian army officer who earned the Military Cross
Northpost	2,911	9,551	Purcell Mountains → The Bugaboos	
Nub	2,746	9,009	Park Ranges	
Oates	3,120	10,240	Park Ranges	Named for British army officer who perished in Antarctica
O'Beirne	2,637	8,652	Park Ranges	
Octopus	2,932	9,619	Mitchell Range	
Odaray	3,137	10,292	Park Ranges → Bow Range	Odaray means "many waterfalls" in the Stoney language
Odin	2,971	9,747	Monashee Mountains → Gold Range	
Odium	2,716	8,911	Elk Range	Named for Canadian army general who served during World War I
Og	2,874	9,429	Park Ranges	Named for a Biblical reference
Ogden	2,702	8,865	Waputik Range	Named for railway vice president
Ogilvie	2,398	7,867	Coast Mountains	Named for William Ogilvie
Old Glory	2,376	7,795	Rossland Range	
Olds	2,542	8,340	Lillooet Ranges → Cayoosh Range	
Oleg	2,587	8,488	Lillooet Ranges → Cayoosh Range	
Olive	3,126	10,256	Park Ranges	
Omega	1,918	6,293	Pacific Ranges → Tantalus Range	
Omega	3,060	10,040	Park Ranges	In Jasper National Park
Omoo	2,674	8,773	Selkirk Mountains → Battle Range	
Onderdonk	2,685	8,809	Selkirk Mountains	
Oppy	3,335	10,942	Park Ranges	Named for a village in France
Orion	2,254	7,395	Hazelton Mountains → Bulkley Ranges	
Oscar	2,336	7,664	Kitimat Ranges	
Ossa	2,261	7,418	Pacific Ranges → Tantalus Range	
Otter	2,693	8,835	Coast Mountains	
Oubliette	3,070	10,070	Park Ranges	
Outlier	2,422	7,946	Coast Mountains → McBride Range	
Outram	2,461	8,074	North Cascades → Hozameen Range	
Outrigger	2,850	9,350	Selkirk Mountains → Battle Range	
Overlander	2,687	8,816	Selwyn Range	
Overlord	2,625	8,612	Garibaldi Ranges → Fitzsimmons Range	
Owen	3,083	10,115	Park Ranges → Bow Range	
Packhorse	2,412	7,913	Clark Range	
Paragon	3,030	9,940	Park Ranges	
Parapet	2,463	8,081	Coast Mountains	
Parapet	3,030	9,940	Park Ranges	
Park	2,951	9,682	Park Ranges → Bow Range	
Parkhurst	2,494	8,182	Garibaldi Ranges	
Pauline	2,653	8,704	Park Ranges	Named for a Canadian politician
Payne	2,468	8,097	North Cascades → Skagit Range	
Pelion	2,312	7,585	Pacific Ranges → Tantalus Range	
Pelly	2,048	6,719	Omineca Mountains → Russel Range	
Pelops	2,015	6,611	Pacific Ranges → Tantalus Range	
Peneplain	1,707	5,600	Coast Mountains	
Pengelly	2,586	8,484	Flathead Range	
Penrose	2,634	8,642	Chilcotin Ranges → Dickson Range	
Pequod	2,979	9,774	Selkirk Mountains → Battle Range	
Perren	3,051	10,010	Bow Range	Named for a climbing guide
Perseus	2,553	8,376	Cariboo Mountains → Quesnel Highland	
Unnamed (formerly Pétain)	3,196	10,486	Park Ranges	On the Continental Divide
Petlushkwohap	2,939	9,642	Cantilever Range	
Phalanx	2,441	8,009	Coast Mountains	
Phillips	3,246	10,650	Park Ranges	Named for a Jasper area outfitter and guide
Phyllis's Engine	2,517	8,258	Coast Mountains	
Pierre Elliott Trudeau	2,650	8,690	Cariboo Mountains → Premier Range	Named for 15th PM of Canada
Pilkington	3,285	10,778	Park Ranges	Named for a British mountaineer
Pilot	995	3,264		
Pioneer	3,245	10,646	Selkirk Mountains → Adamant Range	
Pitt	2,487	8,159	Coast Mountains → McBride Range	Named for prime minister of Great Britain
Poilus	3,161	10,371	Waputik Mountains	Named for the Poilu, French infantrymen of WW I
Poland	2,853	9,360	Park Ranges	Named for Canadian soldier killed in World War II
Pollinger	2,816	9,239	Waputik Mountains	Named for Swiss mountain guide
Popes	3,163	10,377	Bow Range	Named for a Canadian politician
Postern	2,944	9,659	The Ramparts	
President	3,123	10,246	President Range	
Prestley	2,732	8,963	Selkirk Mountains → Valhalla Ranges	Named for Canadian soldier killed in World War II
Prevost	788	2,585	Vancouver Island Ranges	
Price	2,052	6,732	Garibaldi Ranges	
Priestley	2,366	7,762	Coast Mountains → Kitimat Ranges	
Prince Henry	3,219	10,561	The Royal Group	Named for Prince Henry
Prior	3,276	10,748	Park Ranges	Named for a Lt-Governor of B.C.
Proteus	3,198	10,492	Selkirk Mountains → Battle Range	
Ptolemy	2,815	9,236	Flathead Range	Highest in the range
Pukeashun	2,301	7,549	Monashee Mountains → Shuswap Highland	Name means "white rock" in the Secwepemc language
Purity	3,149	10,331	Selkirk Mountains	
Pyramid	2,158	7,080	Coast Mountains	
Pyramid	2,199	7,215	Tahltan Highland	
Quadra	3,173	10,410	Bow Range	Named for its four peaks
Quartz	2,580	8,460	Park Ranges	Top composed mainly of quartz
Quéant	3,120	10,240	Park Ranges	Named for a village in France
Queen Bess	3,298	10,820	Pacific Ranges	Named for Elizabeth I
Queen Elizabeth	2,850	9,350	Park Ranges	Named for Queen Elisabeth of Belgium
Quincy Adams	4,150	13,620	Saint Elias Mountains → Fairweather Range	Named for sixth President of the United States
Rainey	1,983	6,506	Coast Mountains	
Raleigh	3,132	10,276	Pacific Ranges	Named for Walter Raleigh
Rambler	2,092	6,864	Vancouver Island Ranges → Elk River Mountains	Named for local mountaineering club that made the first ascent
Ratz	3,090	10,140	Coast Mountains → Boundary Ranges → Stikine Icecap	
Razorback	3,183	10,443	Coast Mountains → Niut Range	
Razorback	2,605	8,547	Park Ranges	
Rearguard	2,744	9,003	Park Ranges → Rainbow Range	Guards Mount Robson when approached from the rear
Record	2,113	6,932	Rossland Range	
Red	2,072	6,798	Monashee Mountains	Site of ski resort
Redoubt	3,109	10,200	Park Ranges	Name for its appearance to a redoubt
Redtop	3,156	10,354	Purcell Mountains	
Remote	3,038	9,967	Pacific Ranges → Waddington Range	
Rethel	2,408	7,900	Garibaldi Ranges	Named for a train station
Rexford	2,329	7,641	North Cascades → Skagit Range	Named for an early local settler
Reynolds	2,004	6,575	Murray Range	
Rhododendron	2,523	8,278	Coast Mountains	
Rhondda	3,062	10,046	Waputik Mountains	Named for a Welsh politician
Rideout	2,445	8,022	North Cascades → Skagit Range	
Ringrose	3,292	10,801	Bow Range	
Roberts	1,991	6,532	Rossland Range	Named for Lord Roberts
Robson	3,954	12,972	Park Ranges → Rainbow Range	Highest summit of the Canadian Rocky Mountains
Rogers	3,169	10,397	Selkirk Mountains → Hermit Range	Named for American surveyor who discovered Rogers Pass
Rohr	2,423	7,949	Lillooet Ranges → Cayoosh Range	
Ronayne	2,290	7,510	Coast Mountains	
Rostrum	3,284	10,774	Park Ranges	Named for resemblance to a rostrum
Rugged	1,861	6,106	Vancouver Island Ranges → Haihte Range	
Russell	1,742	5,715	Vancouver Island Ranges	
Saint Nicholas	2,938	9,639	Waputik Mountains	
Salloomt Peak	1,873	6,145	Kitimat Ranges	
Sam	2,871	9,419	Mitchell Range	
Sampson	2,811	9,222	Coast Mountains → Thiassi Range	
Saugstad	2,908	9,541	Pacific Ranges	
Scarp	3,000	9,800	Park Ranges	
Scarpe	2,591	8,501	Clark Range	Named for river in France
Schaffer	2,691	8,829	Park Ranges → Bow Range	
Scott	3,300	10,800	Park Ranges	Named for Captain Robert Falcon Scott
Scylla	2,920	9,580	Selkirk Mountains → Battle Range	
Sedgwick	2,082	6,831	Pacific Ranges → Tantalus Range	
Selkirk	2,930	9,610	Omineca Mountains → Mitchell Range	
Selwyn	3,335	10,942	Selkirk Mountains → Duncan Ranges	
Sentinel	2,992	9,816	Selkirk Mountains → Adamant Range	
Sentinel	2,513	8,245	Hart Ranges → Misinchinka Ranges	
Sentry	3,257	10,686	Ottertail Range	
Serendipity	2,857	9,373	Selkirk Mountains	
Sessel	2,746	9,009	Coast Mountains → Thiassi Range	Named for resemblance to a sessel, the German word for "armchair"
Seven O'clock	2,341	7,680	Coast Mountains	
Seven Sisters	2,747	9,012	Hazelton Mountains → Bulkley Ranges	Massif consists of seven named peaks
Seymour	1,449	4,754	Coast Mountains → Fannin Range	Named for governor of colonial B.C.
Shackleton	3,327	10,915	Park Ranges	Named for Ernest Shackleton
Shadowfax	2,315	7,595	Coast Mountains → Cadwallader Range	
Shanks	2,838	9,311	Ball Range	
Sharktooth	2,668	8,753	Cassiar Mountains → Stikine Ranges	
Shedin	2,588	8,491	Skeena Mountains → Atna Range	
Sheer	1,752	5,748	North Shore Mountains	
Shudder	2,671	8,763	Garibaldi Ranges → Spearhead Range	
Sicker	718	2,356		
Sifton	2,922	9,587	Selkirk Mountains → Hermit Range	Named for a Canadian politician
Silvertip	2,596	8,517	North Cascades	
Silverthrone	2,864	9,396	Pacific Ranges	
Simon	3,322	10,899	Park Ranges	Named for explorer Simon Fraser
Sinclair	2,662	8,734	Kootenay Ranges	
Sir Alexander	3,275	10,745	Continental Ranges	Named for Sir Alexander Mackenzie
Sir Allan MacNab	2,297	7,536	Cariboo Mountains → Premier Range	Named for premier of colonial Canada
Sir Douglas	3,406	11,175	Park Ranges	Named for a British Army officer
Sir Richard	2,681	8,796	Coast Mountains → McBride Range	Named for premier of British Columbia
Sir Sandford	3,519	11,545	Selkirk Mountains → Sir Sandford Range	Highest summit of the Selkirk Mountains
Sir Wilfrid Laurier	3,516	11,535	Cariboo Mountains → Premier Range	Highest summit of the Cariboo Mountains
Sisqa	2,357	7,733	Coast Mountains	
Siwhe Mountain	2,843	9,327	Pacific Ranges → Lillooet Ranges	
Skihist	2,968	9,738	Lillooet Ranges → Cantilever Range	
Sky Pilot	2,031	6,663	Britannia Range	Named after a boat
Slalok	2,653	8,704	Lillooet Ranges → Joffre Group	
Slesse	2,439	8,002	North Cascades → Skagit Range	Name means "fang" in the Halkomelem language
Slhanay	665	2,182	Pacific Ranges	
Slide	2,105	6,906	Coast Mountains	
Sloan	2,720	8,920	Coast Mountains → Thiassi Range	Named for a mining engineer
Smythe	2,759	9,052	Muskwa Ranges	
Snow Dome	3,456	11,339	Park Ranges → Winston Churchill Range	A Hydrological apex of North America
Sophist	3,001	9,846	Canadian Rockies → Kitchen Range	
Spatsizi	2,056	6,745	Spatsizi Plateau	
Spearman	3,365	11,040	Pacific Ranges → Waddington Range	
Spetch	2,579	8,461	Lillooet Ranges → Joffre Group	Named for a local businessman
Spire	2,279	7,477	Coast Mountains	
Spring-Rice	3,275	10,745	Park Ranges	Named for a British diplomat
St. Julien	3,090	10,140	Park Ranges	Named for battle in World War I
Stairway	2,999	9,839	Waputik Mountains	Named for rock formations resembling a stairway
Stanley	3,155	10,351	Ball Range	Named for sixth Governor-General of Canada
Stanley Baldwin	3,256	10,682	Cariboo Mountains → Premier Range	Named for PM of the United Kingdom
Stawamus Chief	702	2,303	Pacific Ranges	Popular rock climbing and slacklining destination
Stein	2,761	9,058	Lillooet Ranges	
Steinbok	2,012	6,601	North Cascades	Named for the steinbok (antelope)
Stephen	3,199	10,495	Park Ranges	Named for 1st president of the Canadian Pacific Railway
Stephens	1,592	5,223	Pacific Ranges	Named for a British politician
Stephenson	2,037	6,683	Hart Ranges → Solitude Range	Named for Canadian soldier killed in WW II
Stonerabbit	1,857	6,093	Coast Mountains	
Strachan	2,682	8,799	High Rock Range	Named for Canadian army officer, recipient of the VC
Stupendous	2,682	8,799	Coast Mountains	
Sunburst	2,849	9,347	Park Range	Named for a lake
Sun God	2,421	7,943	Coast Mountains	
Swanzy	2,891	9,485	Selkirk Mountains → Duncan Ranges	
Swiderski	3,133	10,279	The Italian Group	
Synge	2,972	9,751	Waputik Mountains	Named for a British army officer
Tabor	1,247	4,091	Columbia Mountains	
Talbot	2,373	7,785	Front Ranges	Named for a Canadian politician
Talchako	3,037	9,964	Pacific Ranges	
Tantalus	2,608	8,556	Pacific Ranges → Tantalus Range	Highest in the Tantalus Range
Taseko	3,063	10,049	Pacific Ranges → Chilcotin Ranges	
Tatlow	3,063	10,049	Pacific Ranges → Chilcotin Ranges	
Taurus	2,972	9,751	Purcell Mountains	
Taylor	2,318	7,605	Lillooet Ranges → Joffre Group	
Tenquille	2,391	7,844	Coast Mountains	
Tent	2,210	7,250	Flathead Range	
Terminal	2,997	9,833	Selkirk Mountains → Duncan Ranges	
Terrapin	2,954	9,692	Park Ranges	On the Continental Divide
Terry Fox	2,845	9,334	Selwyn Range	Named for Terry Fox
Thar	1,940	6,360	North Cascades	Named for thar
The Black Tusk	2,319	7,608	Garibaldi Ranges	
The Castle	510	1,670	Pacific Ranges	
The Four Squatters	3,072	10,079	Purcell Mountains	
The Helmet	3,420	11,220	Rainbow Range	Peak on the Mt. Robson massif
The Lecture Cutters	2,524	8,281	Coast Mountains → McBride Range	
The Lieutenants	3,270	10,730	Purcell Mountains	
The Marshall	3,180	10,430	Park Ranges	
The Monarch	2,895	9,498	Ball Range	
The Steeples	2,843	9,327	Hughes Range	
The Table	2,021	6,631	Garibaldi Ranges	
The Virgin	2,886	9,469	Purcell Mountains	
The Volcano	1,656	5,433	Coast Mountains → Boundary Ranges	
Thiassi	2,772	9,094	Coast Mountains → Thiassi Range	Named for Thiassi, god of storms in Norse mythology
Thyestes	1,697	5,568	Pacific Ranges → Tantalus Range	Named for Thyestes, a king in Greek mythology
Thomlinson	2,451	8,041	Babine Range	
Tiedemann	3,838	12,592	Pacific Ranges → Waddington Range	
Tilley	2,649	8,691	Monashee Mountains → Gold Range	Named for Canadian politician
Tinniswood	2,606	8,550	Coast Mountains	
Titkana	2,827	9,275	Rainbow Range	Titkana is the Stoney Indian word for "bird"
Tod	2,155	7,070	Monashee Mountains	
Tolkien	2,380	7,810	Coast Mountains → Cadwallader Range	Named for J. R. R. Tolkien
Tonquin	2,396	7,861	South Jasper Ranges	
Tonsa	3,053	10,016	Bow Range	Stoney Indian word for the number four
Topham	2,872	9,423	Selkirk Mountains → Duncan Ranges	Named for an English mountaineer who explored and mapped the Selkirks
Tornado	3,090	10,140	High Rock Range	
Tower	2,269	7,444	Muskwa Ranges	
Treadmill	2,716	8,911	Front Ranges	Named for similarity to a treadmill
Tremor	2,691	8,829	Garibaldi Ranges → Spearhead Range	
Triad	3,048	10,000	Park Ranges	
Trolltinder	2,912	9,554	Wapta Icefield → Waputik Range	Named for resemblance to Store Trolltind in Norway
Trophy	2,577	8,455	Monashee Mountains → Shuswap Highland	
Trorey	2,461	8,074	Garibaldi Ranges → Spearhead Range	
Troubridge	1,304	4,278	Pacific Ranges	Sunshine Coast
Truce	3,262	10,702	Purcell Mountains	
Trutch	3,258	10,689	Park Ranges	Named for first Lieutenant Governor of B.C.
Tsaydaychuz	2,758	9,049	Hazelton Mountains → Pattullo Rangee	
Tsitsutl	2,495	8,186	Rainbow Range	Tsitsutl means "painted mountains"
Tuchodi	2,900	9,500	Northern Rocky Mountains	Named for the Tuchodi River
Tumbling	3,145	10,318	Vermilion Range	
Turner	2,640	8,660	Saint Elias Mountains → Fairweather Range	
Twin Goat	2,128	6,982	Lillooet Ranges → Joffre Group	
Typee	2,897	9,505	Selkirk Mountains → Battle Range	
Tyrwhitt	2,974	9,757	Elk Range	Named for a British admiral
Tzoonie	2,123	6,965	Coast Mountains	
Ulysses	3,024	9,921	Muskwa Ranges	Named for Ulysses, a king in Greek mythology
Unicorn	3,010	9,880	Selkirk Mountains → Adamant Range	
Unnecessary	1,548	5,079	Pacific Ranges → North Shore Mountains	
Upright Mountain	2,978	9,770	Front Ranges	FA 1911
Ursus Major	2,705	8,875	Selkirk Mountains → Hermit Range	
Ursus Minor	2,749	9,019	Selkirk Mountains → Hermit Range	
Uto	2,927	9,603	Selkirk Mountains	
Valenciennes	3,150	10,330	Park Ranges	Named for Valenciennes
Vantage	2,235	7,333	Lillooet Ranges → Joffre Group	
Vaux	3,310	10,860	Park Ranges → Ottertail Range	
Verendrye	3,086	10,125	Vermilion Range	Named for Pierre de La Vérendrye
Vermilion	2,647	8,684	Ball Range	
Vetter	2,100	6,900	Kitimat Ranges	
Victoria	3,464	11,365	Bow Range	Named for Queen Victoria
Victoria	2,088	6,850	Pacific Ranges	Named for Queen Victoria
Victoria	2,163	7,096	Vancouver Island Ranges → Sutton Range	
Vicuna	2,126	6,975	North Cascades	Named for the Vicuña, a camel species in the Andes
Vista	2,795	9,170	Park Ranges	Named for its views at the top
Waddington	4,019	13,186	Pacific Ranges → Waddington Range	Highest summit of the Coast Mountains
Waitabit	3,090	10,140	Park Ranges	Named for Waitabit Creek
Wales	3,109	10,200	Park Ranges	Named for a British astronomer
Wallace	2,940	9,650	Purcell Mountains → The Bugaboos	Named for a Canadian surveyor
Walter	3,401	11,158	Park Ranges	Fourth highest subpeak of Mt. Lyell (3498 m)
Wapta	2,778	9,114	Waputik Mountains → President Range	Wapta means "river" in the Stoney language
Warburton Pike	401	1,316		
Warden	1,970	6,460	Vancouver Island Ranges	
Wardle	2,805	9,203	Vermilion Range	
Watchman	3,009	9,872	Park Ranges	FA 1918
Warrior	2,973	9,754	Park Ranges	Named for a British warship heavily damaged in the Battle of Jutland
Watson	2,955	9,695	Park Ranges	Named for a Canadian army general
Watson	1,923	6,309	Solitude Range	Named for a Canadian soldier killed in WWII
Weart	2,835	9,301	Garibaldi Ranges	
Webb	2,164	7,100	Cascade Range	
Wedge	2,895	9,498	Garibaldi Ranges	Named for its wedge like shape
Wedgwood	3,024	9,921	Park Ranges	Named for an English mountaineer who was killed in World War I
Welch	2,431	7,976	North Cascades → Skagit Range	Named for a business owner who operated a nearby mine
Whaleback	2,627	8,619	Waputik Mountains	
Wheeler	3,336	10,945	Selkirk Mountains → Duncan Ranges	Named for first president of the Alpine Club of Canada
Whirlwind	2,427	7,963	Garibaldi Ranges → Fitzsimmons Range	
Whitecap	2,918	9,573	Bendor Range	
Whitecrow	2,881	9,452	Park Ranges	Named for white crows seen on peak by FA party
Whiteaves	3,145	10,318	Park Ranges	Named for a British palaeontologist
White-Fraser	2,331	7,648	Coast Mountains → Boundary Ranges	Named for a member of the International Boundary Survey
Whitehorn	3,399	11,152	Park Ranges	
Whitesaddle	2,990	9,810	Coast Mountains → Niut Range	
Whiteshield	2,684	8,806	Park Ranges	Named for snow and ice on eastern side
Whitford	1,987	6,519	Hart Ranges → Misinchinka Ranges	Named for a Canadian soldier
Whiting	2,524	8,281	Coast Mountains → Boundary Ranges	
Whymper (Frederick)	1,539	5,049	Vancouver Island Ranges	Named for a British explorer
Wilkie	2,699	8,855	Selkirk Mountains → Lardeau Range	
Williams	2,741	8,993	Park Ranges	
Williams	2,123	6,965	North Cascades → Skagit Range	
Wiwaxy	2,706	8,878	Park Ranges	
Work	449	1,473	Vancouver Island Ranges → Gowlland Range	Vancouver Island
Worthington	2,915	9,564	Spray Range	Named for Canadian army officer killed in WW II
Wrong	2,869	9,413	Selkirk Mountains → Battle Range	
Yak Peak	2,039	6,690	North Cascades	
Ygdrasil	2,960	9,710	Selkirk Mountains → Adamant Range	
Yellowhead	2,458	8,064	Victoria Cross Ranges	
Youngs	2,815	9,236	Selkirk Mountains → Duncan Ranges	
Ymir	2,398	7,867	Selkirk Mountains → Nelson Range	Named for the Norse god
Younghusband	3,170	10,400	Chaba Icefield	Named for a British army officer
Yukness	2,851	9,354	Park Ranges	Named for the Stoney language expression for "sharpened with a knife"
Zupjok	1,835	6,020	North Cascades	Named for the zupjok, the male progeny of a male cow and a female yak

== See also ==
- Geography of British Columbia
- List of mountains of Canada
- Mountain peaks of Canada
- List of mountain peaks of North America
- List of mountain peaks of the Rocky Mountains
