= Hour Peak =

Mountain in the country of Canada

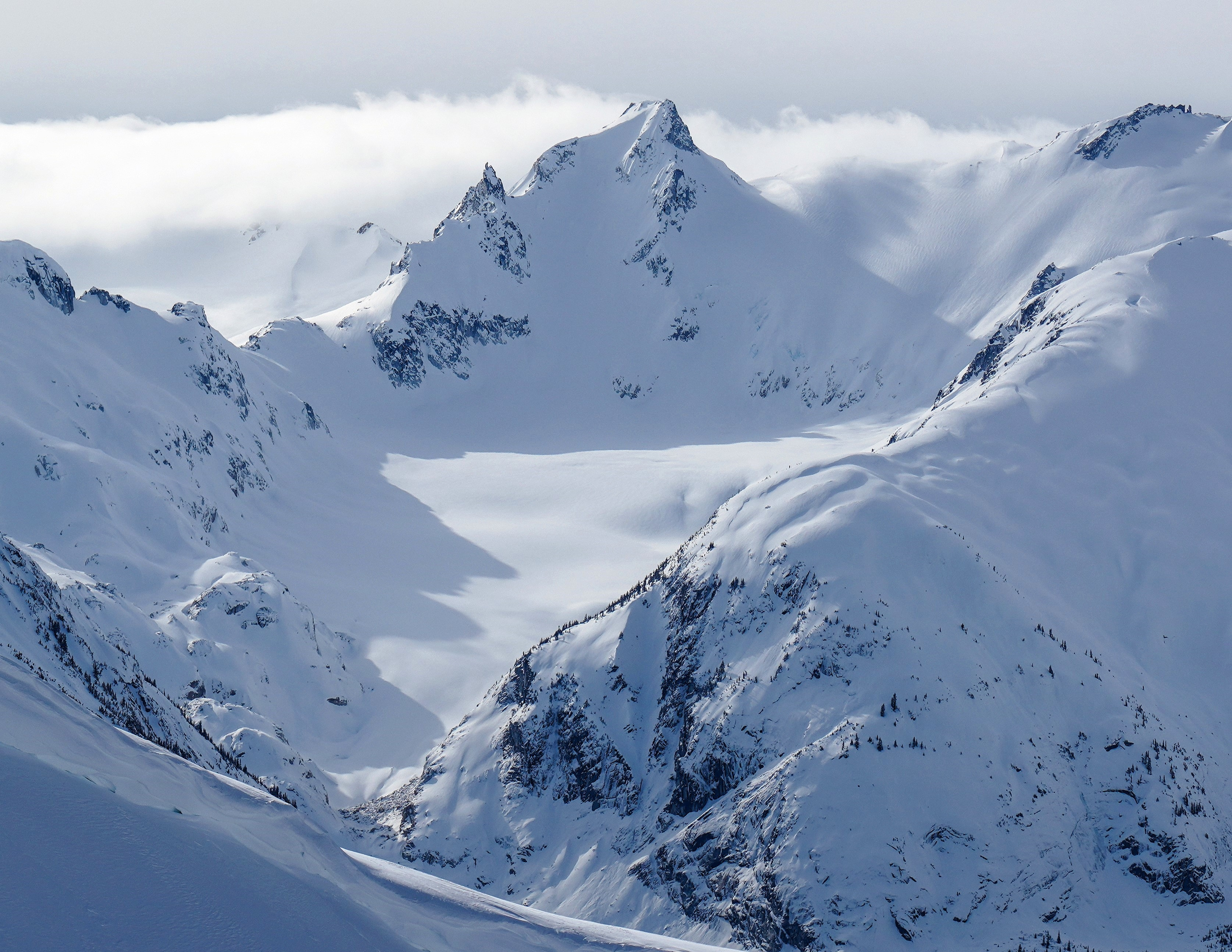
- North aspect

Highest point
- Elevation: 2,329 m (7,641 ft)
- Prominence: 112 m (367 ft)
- Parent peak: Isosceles Peak
- Isolation: 0.79 km (0.49 mi)
- Listing: Mountains of British Columbia
- Coordinates: 49°53′36″N 122°53′06″W

Geography
- Location within British Columbia Location within Canada
- Interactive map of Hour Peak
- Country: Canada
- Province: British Columbia
- District: New Westminster Land District
- Protected area: Garibaldi Provincial Park
- Parent range: Garibaldi Ranges; Coast Mountains
- Topo map: NTS 92G15 Mamquam Mountain

Hour Peak is a 2,329-metre (7,641-foot) mountain summit located in British Columbia, Canada.

== Description ==
Hour Peak is set within Garibaldi Provincial Park and is part of the Garibaldi Ranges of the Coast Mountains. It is situated 67 km (42 mi) north of Vancouver and 1.35 km (1 mi) southeast of Isosceles Peak, the nearest higher neighbor. Precipitation runoff and glacial meltwater from the south side of the peak drains to the Pitt River, whereas the northern slope drains to Cheakamus Lake via Isosceles Creek. Topographic relief is significant as the summit rises 1,630 meters (5,348 feet) above Pitt River in 3 kilometers (1.9 miles). The mountain's toponym was officially adopted on June 21, 1978, by the Geographical Names Board of Canada.

== Climate ==
Based on the Köppen climate classification, Hour Peak is located in the marine west coast climate zone of western North America. Most weather fronts originate in the Pacific Ocean, and travel east toward the Coast Mountains where they are forced upward by the range (orographic lift), causing them to drop their moisture in the form of rain or snowfall. As a result, the Coast Mountains experience high precipitation, especially during the winter months in the form of snowfall. Winter temperatures can drop below −20 °C with wind chill factors below −30 °C. This climate supports the Isosceles Glacier on the north slope and unnamed glaciers surrounding the peak.

== See also ==
- Geography of British Columbia
