= Mount Loki =

Mountain in British Columbia, Canada

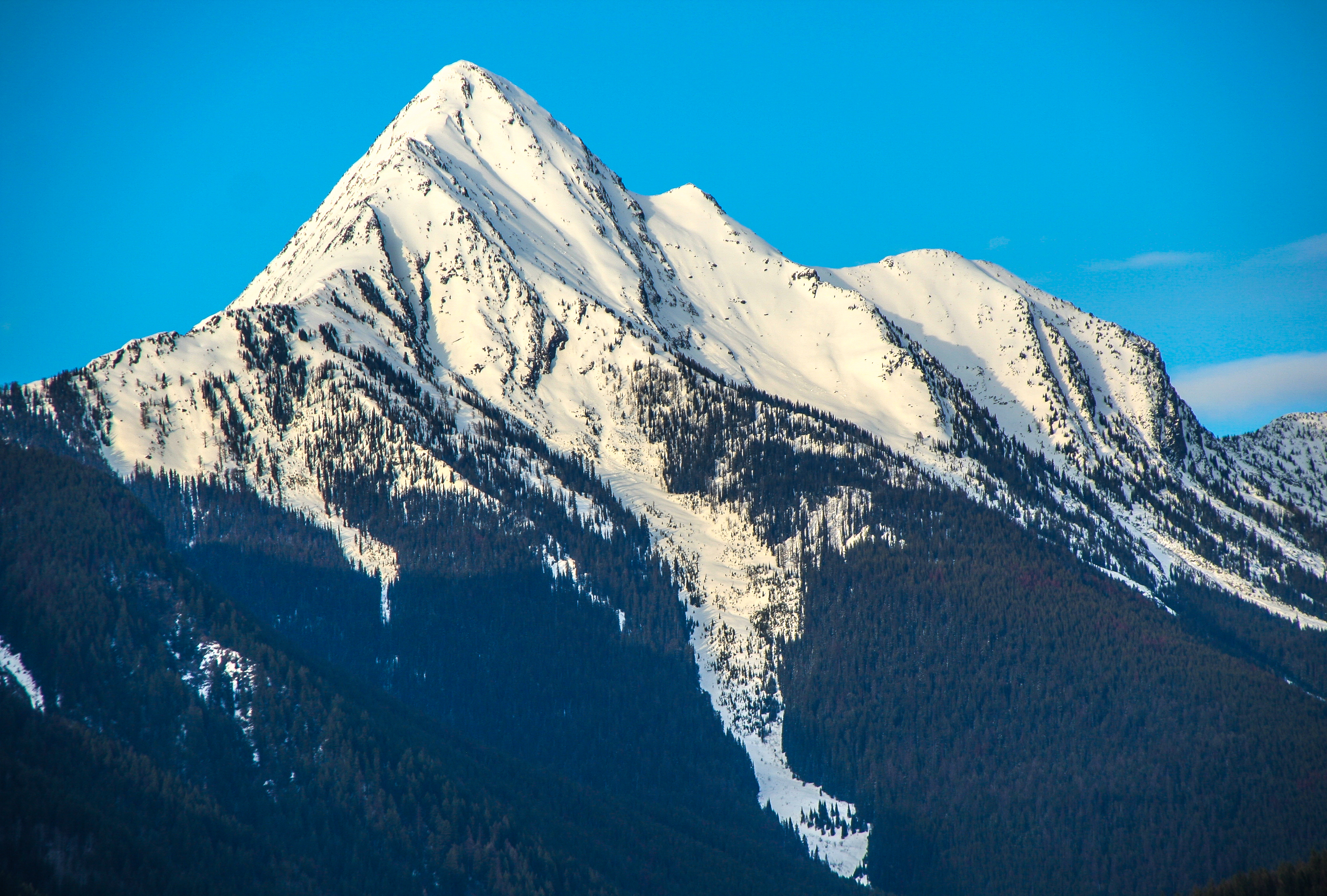
- West aspect, from Highway 31

Highest point
- Elevation: 2,779 m (9,117 ft)
- Prominence: 609 m (1,998 ft)
- Parent peak: Mount Findlay (3,162 m)
- Isolation: 5.47 km (3.40 mi)
- Listing: Mountains of British Columbia
- Coordinates: 49°50′30″N 116°45′10″W

Naming
- Etymology: Loki

Geography
- Location within British Columbia Location within Canada
- Interactive map of Mount Loki
- Country: Canada
- Province: British Columbia
- District: Kootenay Land District
- Parent range: Purcell Mountains
- Topo map: NTS 82F15 Kaslo

Climbing
- Easiest route: Climbing trail

Mount Loki is a 2,779-metre (9,117-foot) mountain summit located in British Columbia, Canada.

== Description ==
This prominent peak is situated 13 km (8 mi) southeast of Kaslo on the eastern side of Kootenay Lake. It is part of the Purcell Mountains and the nearest higher neighbor is Mount Baldr, 5.5 km (3 mi) to the northeast. Precipitation runoff from the peak's slopes drains west to Kootenay Lake via Loki and Bernard creeks. Topographic relief is significant as the summit rises 1,480 metres (4,855 ft) above Loki Creek in approximately 2.5 km (1.6 mi) and 2,250 metres (7,382 ft) above Kootenay Lake in 7 km (4.3 mi). The peak can be seen from Highway 31.

== Etymology ==
The mountain is named for Loki, a mischievous character in Norse mythology able to change his shape and engage in sight-deceiving magic. The toponym was officially adopted on December 7, 1937, by the Geographical Names Board of Canada as originally labelled on George Mercer Dawson's Geological Survey of Canada map published in 1890. Dawson applied names derived from Scandinavian mythology to several of the mountain ranges and peaks in Southern Kootenay.

== Climate ==
Based on the Köppen climate classification, Mount Loki is located in a subarctic climate zone of western North America. Winter temperatures can drop below −20 °C with wind chill factors below −30 °C. The months July through September offer the most favorable weather for climbing Mount Loki.

== See also ==
- Geography of British Columbia
