= Hall Peak (British Columbia) =

Mountain in British Columbia, Canada

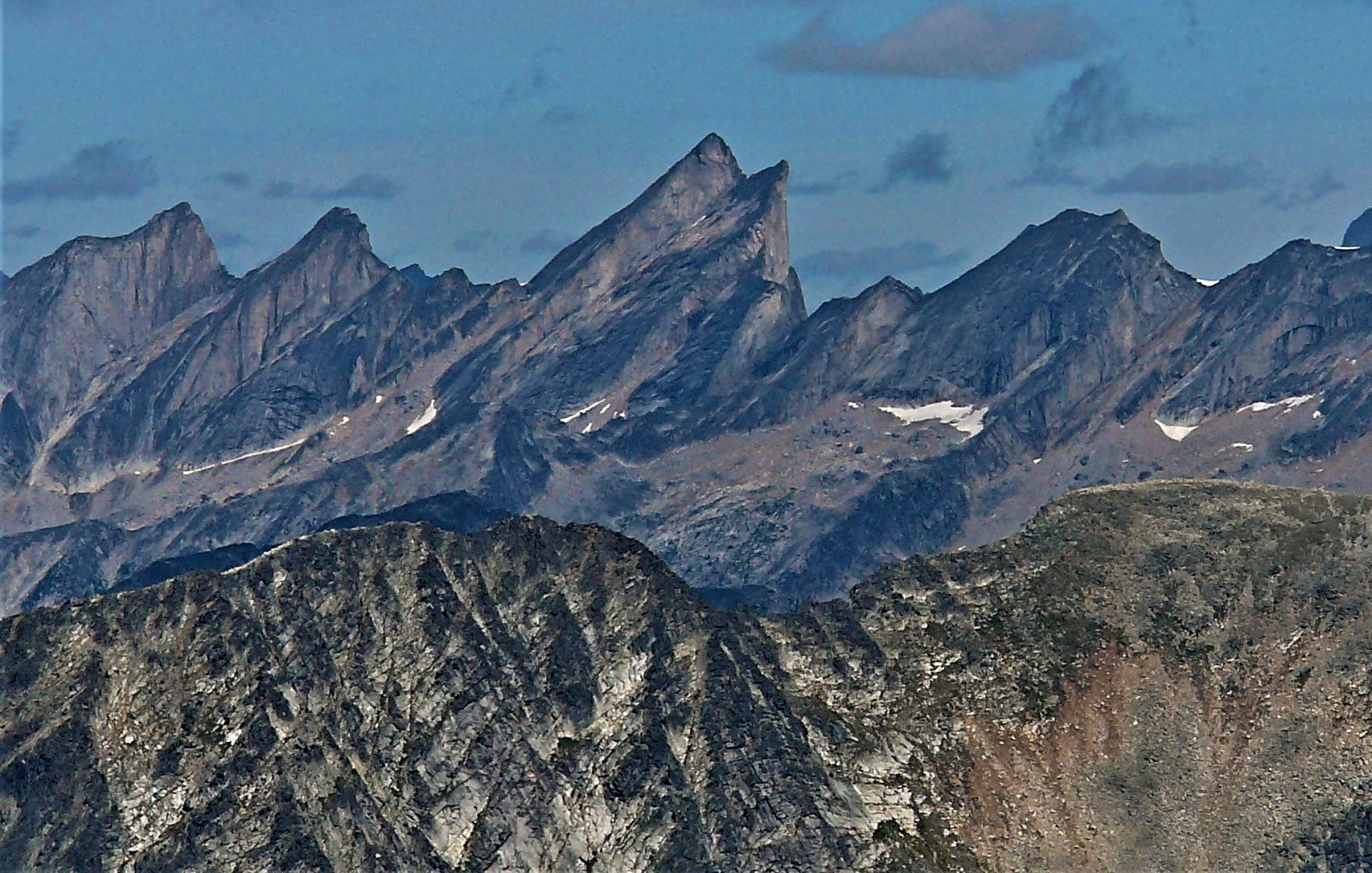
- Southwest aspect

Highest point
- Elevation: 3,048 m (10,000 ft)
- Prominence: 829 m (2,720 ft)
- Parent peak: Mount Findlay (3,162 m)
- Isolation: 10.94 km (6.80 mi)
- Listing: Mountains of British Columbia
- Coordinates: 49°58′24″N 116°35′11″W

Naming
- Etymology: John H. Hall

Geography
- Location within British Columbia Location within Canada
- Interactive map of Hall Peak
- Country: Canada
- Province: British Columbia
- District: Kootenay Land District
- Protected area: Purcell Wilderness Conservancy Provincial Park and Protected Area
- Parent range: Purcell Mountains
- Topo map: NTS 82F15 Kaslo

Geology
- Rock type: Granite

Climbing
- First ascent: June 1933
- Easiest route: class 5 climbing

Hall Peak is a 3,048-metre (10,000-foot) mountain summit located in British Columbia, Canada.

== Description ==
Hall Peak is situated 24 km (15 mi) east-northeast of Kaslo in the Purcell Mountains and within the Purcell Wilderness Conservancy Provincial Park and Protected Area. Precipitation runoff from the peak's slopes drains to Kootenay Lake via Pinnacle and Fry creeks. Topographic relief is significant as the summit rises approximately 1,400 metres (4,593 ft) in 2 km (1.2 mi). Hall Peak is the highest point of the Leaning Towers Group. The nearest higher neighbor is Mount Clutterbuck, 11.1 km (7 mi) to the northeast.

== History ==
The first ascent of the summit was made in June 1933 by Alexander Addison McCoubrey, Roger Neave, and Burton Blanchard. The group called the peak "Leaning Tower". The mountain is now named in remembrance of Private John H. Hall from Marysville (now part of Kimberley) who was killed in action during World War II. The toponym was officially adopted on May 3, 1961, by the Geographical Names Board of Canada.

== Climate ==
Based on the Köppen climate classification, Hall Peak is located in a subarctic climate zone of western North America. Winter temperatures can drop below −20 °C with wind chill factors below −30 °C. This climate supports a small unnamed glacier on the north aspect of the peak. The months June through September offer the most favorable weather for climbing this peak.

== Gallery ==
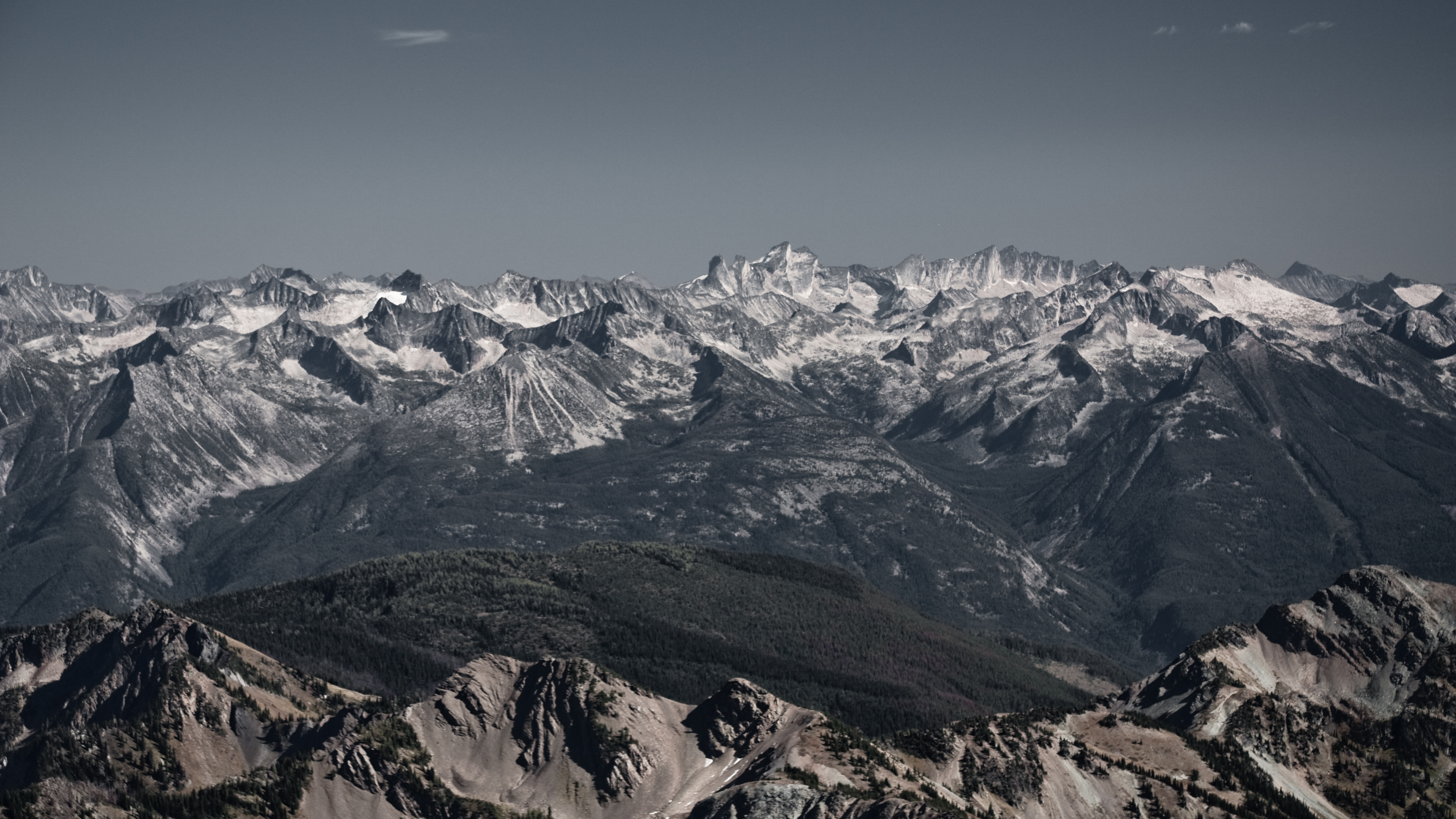
Hall Peak is highest point centered on horizon

== See also ==
- Geography of British Columbia
