= Parapet Peak =

Mountain in Western Canada

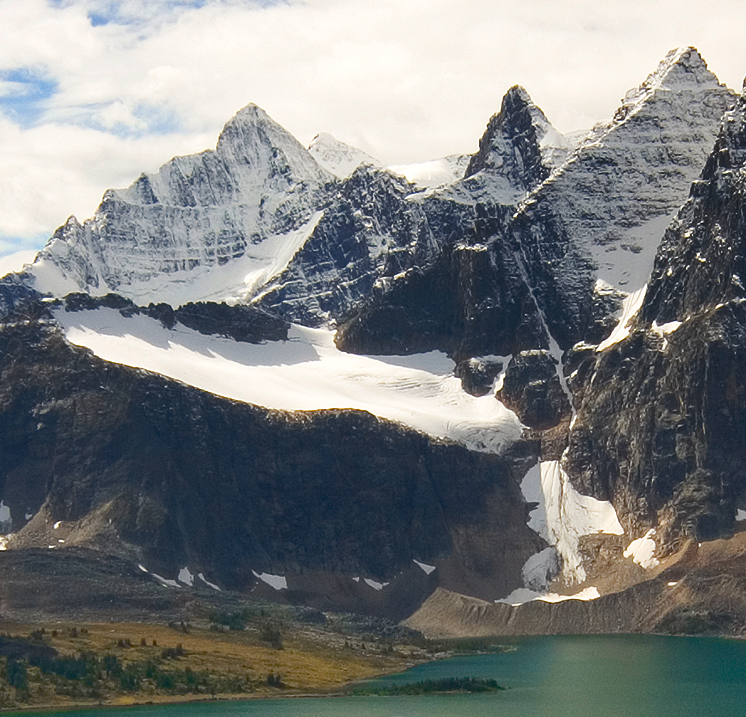
- Parapet Peak is the dark peak between Bennington Peak (left), and Paragon Peak (right)

Highest point
- Elevation: 3,030 m (9,940 ft)
- Prominence: 177 m (581 ft)
- Parent peak: Bennington Peak (3260 m)
- Listing: Mountains of Alberta; Mountains of British Columbia
- Coordinates: 52°40′01″N 118°17′39″W

Geography
- Location within Alberta Location within British Columbia Location within Canada
- Country: Canada
- Provinces: Alberta and British Columbia
- Protected areas: Jasper National Park; Mount Robson Provincial Park
- Parent range: Park Ranges
- Topo map: NTS 83D9 Amethyst Lakes

Parapet Peak is located at southern end of Mount Robson Provincial Park on the border of Alberta and British Columbia. It was named in 1921 by Cyril G. Wates.

== Climate ==
Based on the Köppen climate classification, the mountain is located in a subarctic climate with cold, snowy winters, and mild summers. Temperatures can drop below -20 °C with wind chill factors below -30 °C. In terms of favorable weather, July and August present the best months for climbing. However, these months coincide with mosquito season, which requires effective defenses. Precipitation runoff from the mountain drains into tributaries of the Athabasca River on its east side, and the headwaters of the Fraser River from the west side.

== See also ==
- List of peaks on the British Columbia–Alberta border
