= Mount Beatty =

Mountain in the country of Canada

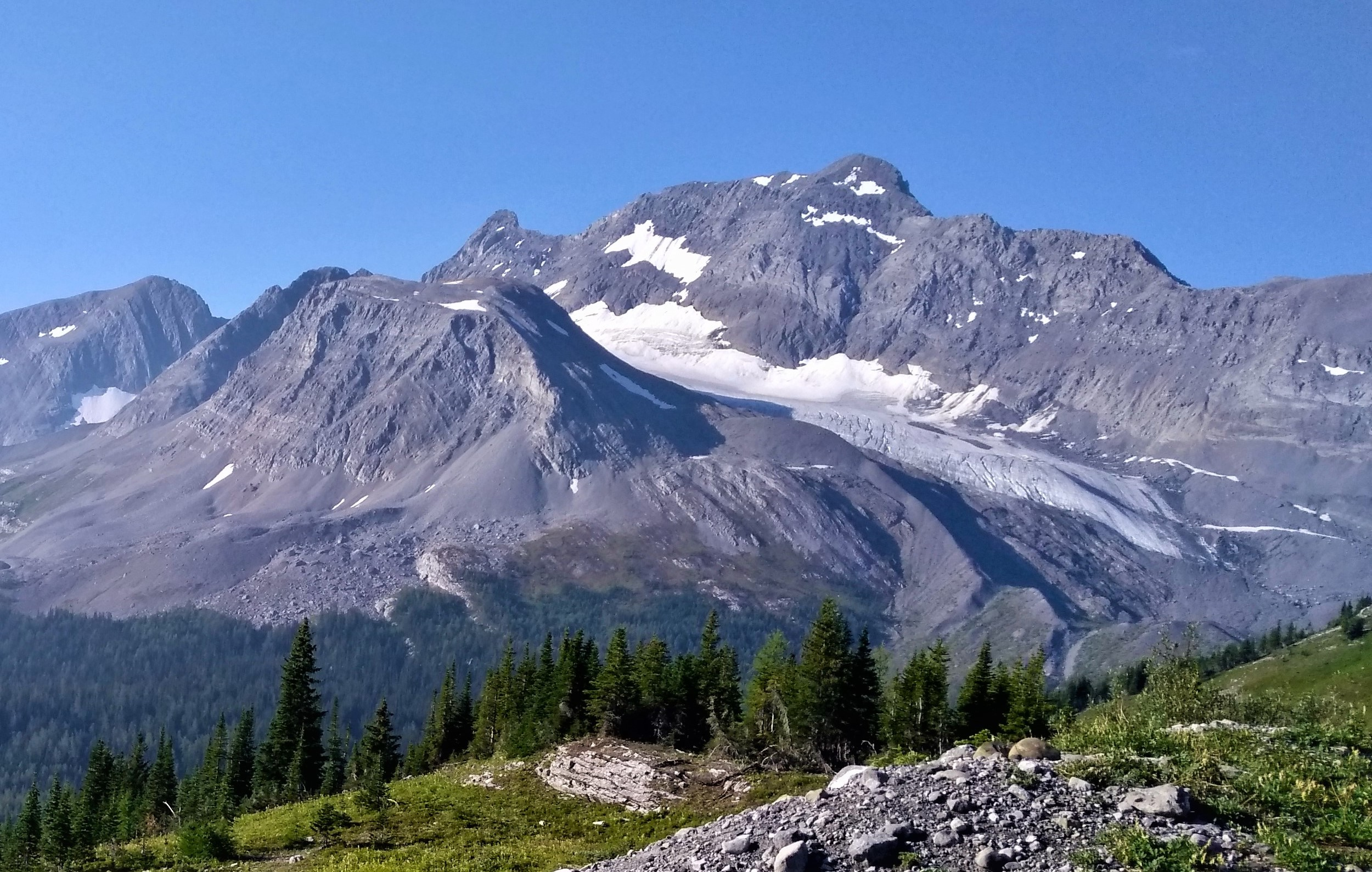
- North aspect

Highest point
- Elevation: 3,004 m (9,856 ft)
- Prominence: 642 m (2,106 ft)
- Parent peak: Mount Maude (3043 m)
- Listing: Mountains of Alberta; Mountains of British Columbia
- Coordinates: 50°40′10″N 115°17′23″W

Geography
- Location within Alberta Location within British Columbia Location within Canada
- Interactive map of Mount Beatty
- Country: Canada
- Provinces: Alberta and British Columbia
- Parent range: Park Ranges
- Topo map: NTS 82J11 Kananaskis Lakes

Climbing
- First ascent: 1916 Interprovincial Boundary Commission

Mount Beatty is a mountain located on the border of Alberta and British Columbia on the Continental Divide. It was named in 1924 after David Beatty, a British naval officer of Irish ancestry who commanded ships in the First World War.

== Geology ==
Mount Beatty is composed of sedimentary rock laid down during the Precambrian to Jurassic periods. Formed in shallow seas, this sedimentary rock was pushed east and over the top of younger rock during the Laramide orogeny.

== Climate ==
Based on the Köppen climate classification, Mount Beatty is located in a subarctic climate zone with cold, snowy winters, and mild summers. Winter temperatures can drop below −20 °C (−4 °F) with wind chill factors below −30 °C (−22 °F).

== Gallery ==
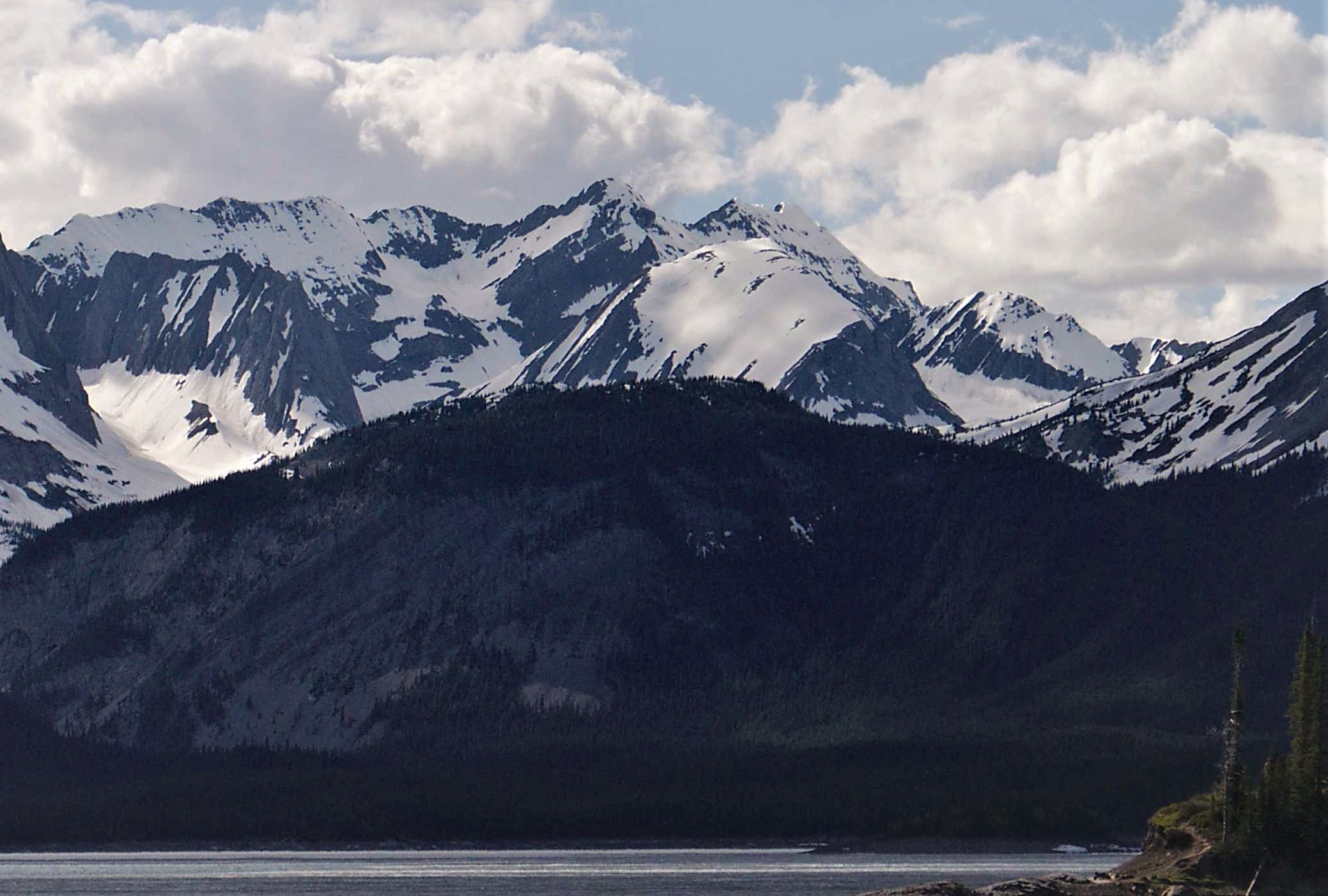
Southeast aspect

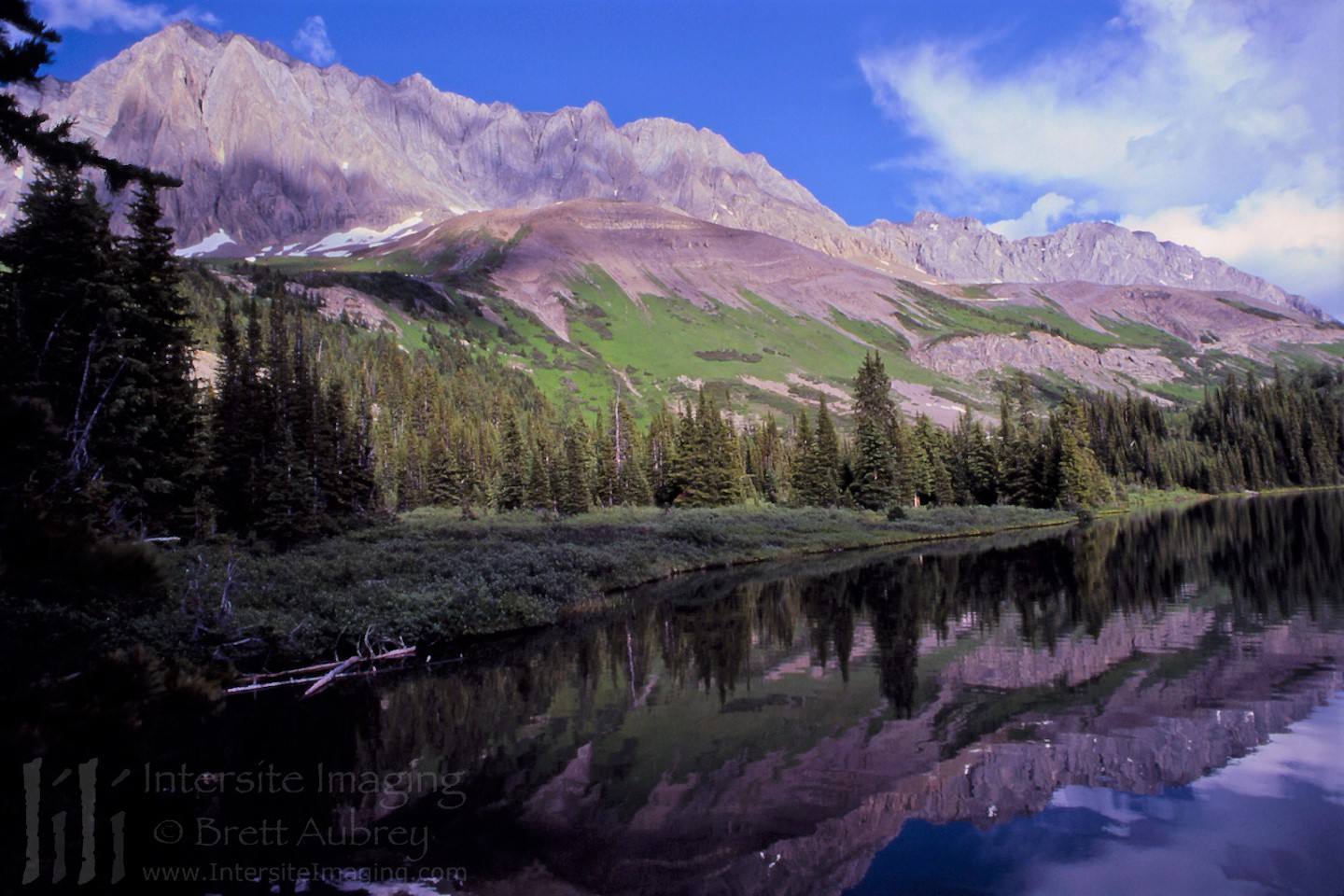
Mt. Beatty, Beatty Lake, Kananaskis Country, AB

== See also ==
- List of peaks on the British Columbia–Alberta border
