= Mount Helen (British Columbia) =

Mountain in British Columbia, Canada

- Location within British Columbia Location within Canada

Highest point
- Elevation: 2,549 m (8,363 ft)
- Prominence: 240 m (790 ft)
- Listing: Mountains of British Columbia
- Coordinates: 57°16′30″N 123°55′05″W

Geography
- Country: Canada
- Province: British Columbia
- District: Peace River Land District
- Parent range: Muskwa Ranges
- Topo map: NTS 94G5 Redfern Lake

Mount Helen is a mountain located south of Fairy Lake and the Besa River in British Columbia, Canada. The mountain was named after the wife of a Vice President of a local oil company.
