= Mount Muir (High Rock Range) =

Mountain in the country of Canada

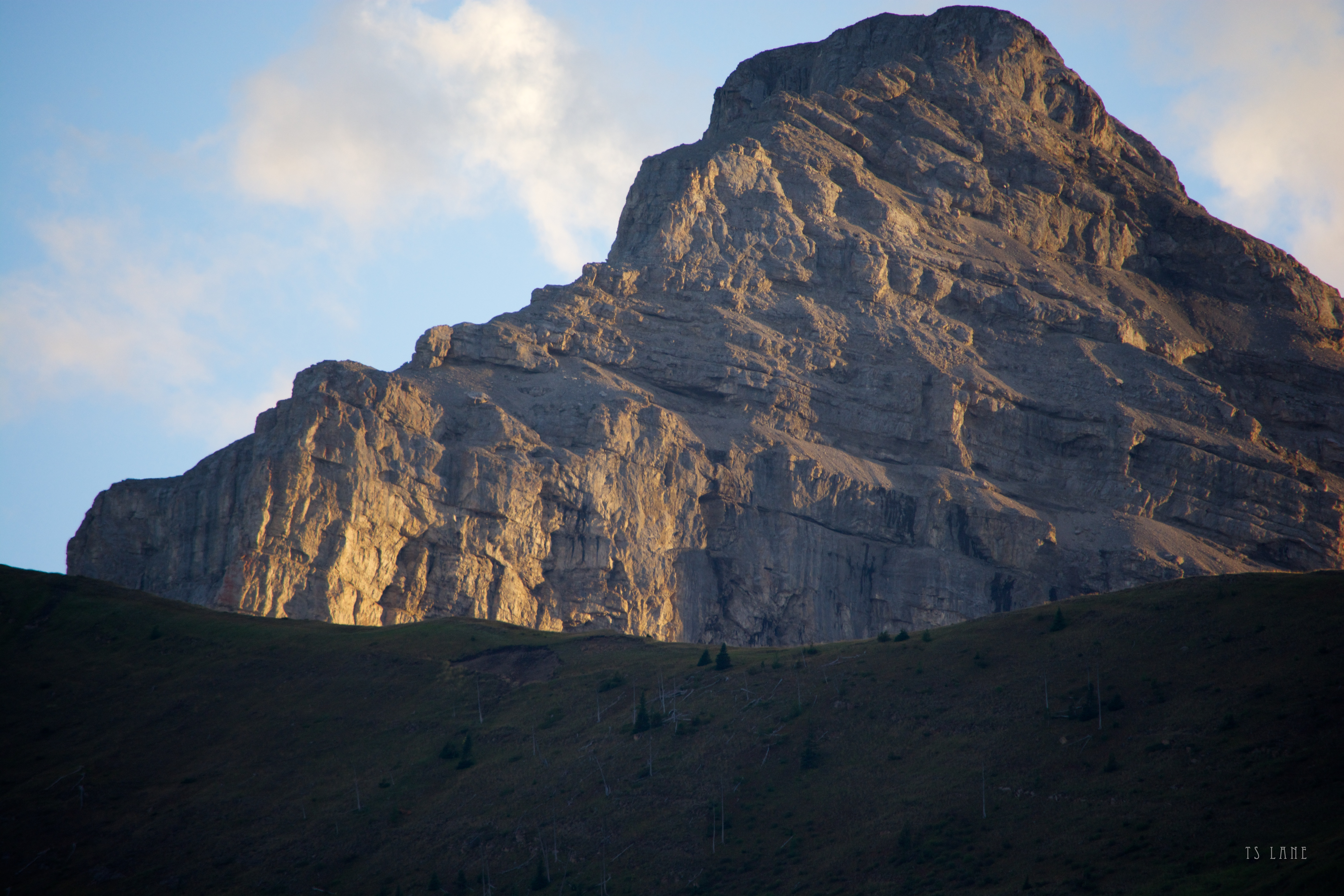
- North aspect

Highest point
- Elevation: 2,758 m (9,049 ft)
- Prominence: 518 m (1,699 ft)
- Listing: Mountains of Alberta; Mountains of British Columbia
- Coordinates: 50°23′28″N 114°49′35″W

Geography
- Location within Alberta Location within British Columbia Location within Canada
- Country: Canada
- Provinces: Alberta and British Columbia
- Parent range: High Rock Range
- Topo map: NTS 82J7 Mount Head

Mount Muir is a mountain located on the Continental Divide on the Alberta-British Columbia border. The mountain was named in 1918 after Alexander Muir. It is located in the High Rock Range.

== See also ==
- List of peaks on the British Columbia–Alberta border
