= Mount Muir (Vancouver Island) =

Mountain in British Columbia, Canada

- Location within Vancouver Island

Highest point
- Elevation: 880 m (2,890 ft)
- Prominence: 388 m (1,273 ft)
- Parent peak: Valentine Mountain (978 m)
- Listing: Mountains of British Columbia
- Coordinates: 48°28′46″N 123°52′01″W

Geography
- Country: Canada
- Province: British Columbia
- Topo map: NTS 92B5 Sooke

Mount Muir is a mountain located in the Malahat Land District, Vancouver Island, British Columbia.
