= Gemse Peak =

Mountain in the country of Canada

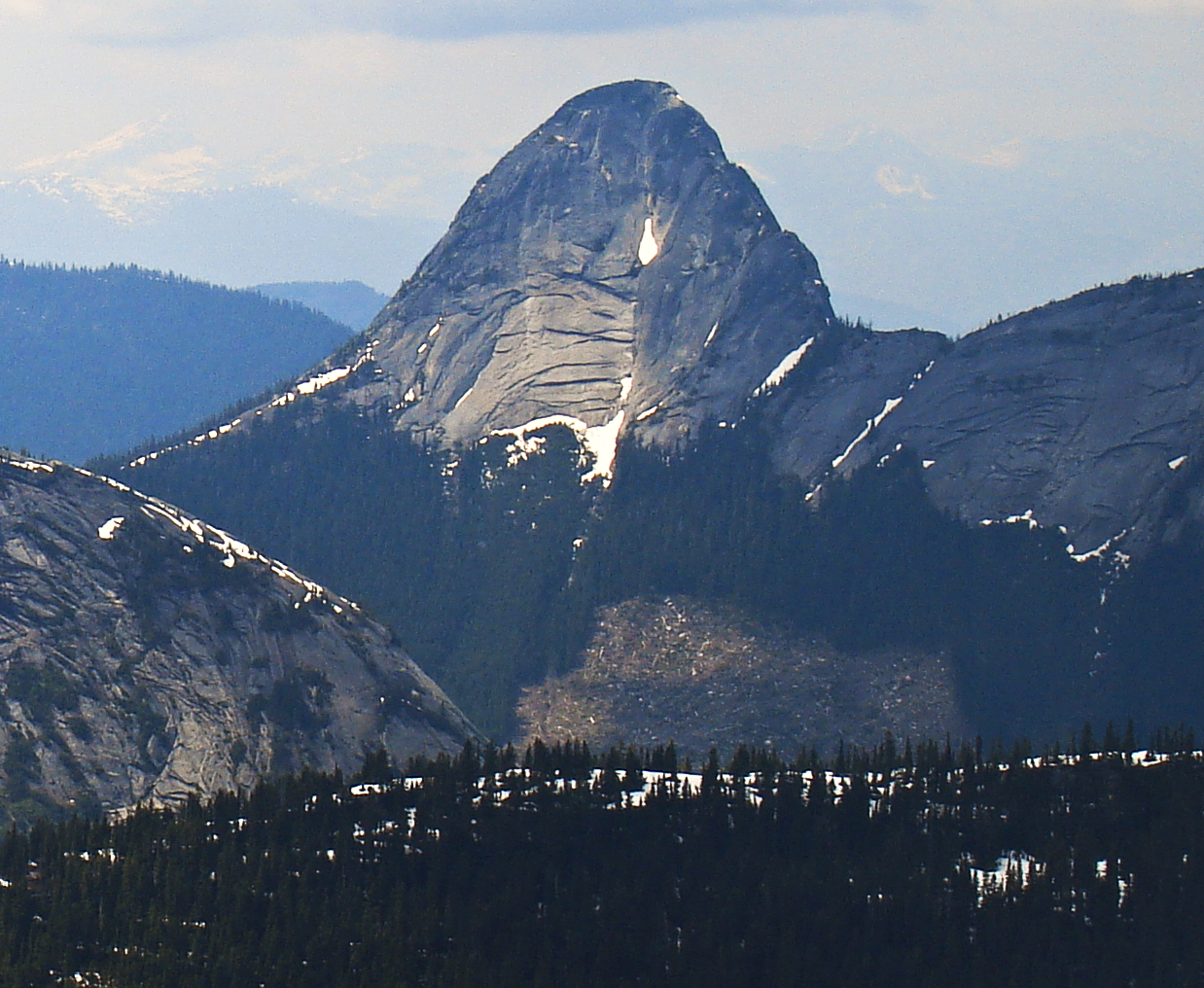
- Gemse Peak

Highest point
- Elevation: 1,890 m (6,200 ft)
- Prominence: 300 m (980 ft)
- Parent peak: Ibex Peak (2039 m)
- Listing: Mountains of British Columbia
- Coordinates: 49°39′12″N 121°13′11″W

Geography
- Location within British Columbia Location within Canada
- Interactive map of Gemse Peak
- Location: British Columbia, Canada
- District: Yale Division Yale Land District
- Parent range: North Cascades
- Topo map: NTS 92H11 Spuzzum

Geology
- Rock type: granitic

Climbing
- First ascent: 1974, by Philip Kubik, Ed Zenger
- Easiest route: class 4 via south ridge

Gemse Peak, is a 1,890-metre (6,200-foot) granitic horn located in the North Cascades of southwestern British Columbia, Canada. It is situated 12 km (7 mi) west-northwest of Coquihalla Summit, 3.5 km (2 mi) west of Alpaca Peak, and 2.5 km (2 mi) northeast of Steinbok Peak. Precipitation runoff from the peak drains into tributaries of the Anderson River. The mountain was named for the gemse, the chamois of Germany, as part of the ungulate names theme for several other nearby peaks that were submitted by Philip Kubik of the 1974 first ascent party. The mountain's name was officially adopted on February 5, 1976, by the Geographical Names Board of Canada.

== Geology ==
The history of the formation of the Cascade Mountains dates back millions of years ago to the late Eocene Epoch. With the North American Plate overriding the Pacific Plate, episodes of volcanic igneous activity persisted. In addition, small fragments of the oceanic and continental lithosphere called terranes created the North Cascades about 50 million years ago.

During the Pleistocene period dating back over two million years ago, glaciation advancing and retreating repeatedly scoured the landscape. The U-shaped cross section of the river valleys is a result of recent glaciation. Uplift and faulting in combination with glaciation have been the dominant processes which have created the tall peaks and deep valleys of the North Cascades area.

The North Cascades features some of the most rugged topography in the Cascade Range with craggy peaks and ridges, deep glacial valleys, and granite spires. Geological events occurring many years ago created the diverse topography and drastic elevation changes over the Cascade Range leading to various climate differences which lead to vegetation variety defining the ecoregions in this area.

== Climate ==
Based on the Köppen climate classification, Gemse Peak is located in the marine west coast climate zone of western North America. Most weather fronts originate in the Pacific Ocean, and travel east toward the Cascade Range where they are forced upward by the range (Orographic lift), causing them to drop their moisture in the form of rain or snowfall. As a result, the Cascade Mountains experience high precipitation, especially during the winter months in the form of snowfall. Temperatures can drop below −20 °C with wind chill factors below −30 °C. The months July through September offer the most favorable weather for climbing Gemse Peak.

== Climbing Routes ==
Established climbing routes on Gemse Peak:

- South Ridge - class 4
- East Ridge - class 5.5 First ascent 1974
- Northwest Buttress - class 5.8 FA 1975
- Southwest Face - class 5.7 FA 1986

== Gallery ==
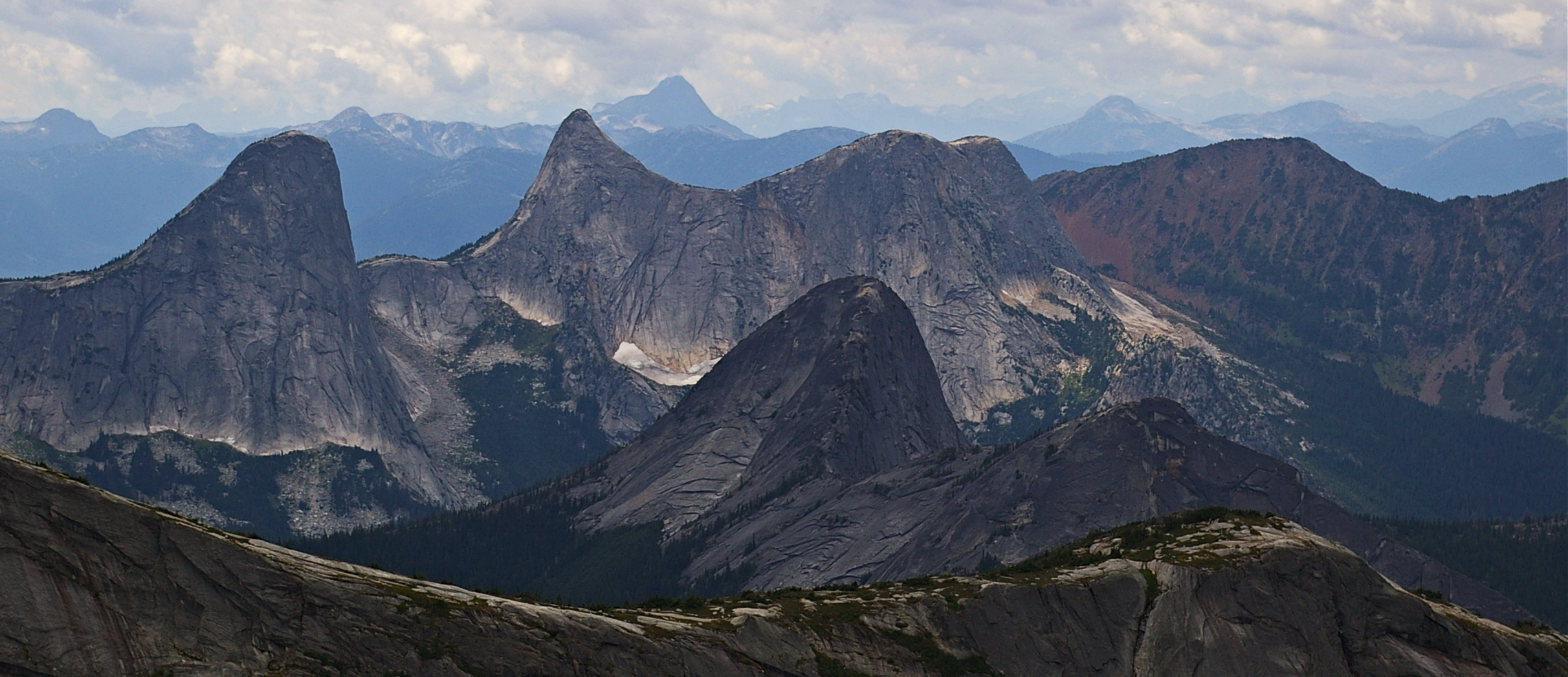
Gemse Peak with Steinbok and Ibex to left

== See also ==
- Geography of the North Cascades
- Geology of British Columbia
