= Zupjok Peak =

Mountain in British Columbia, Canada

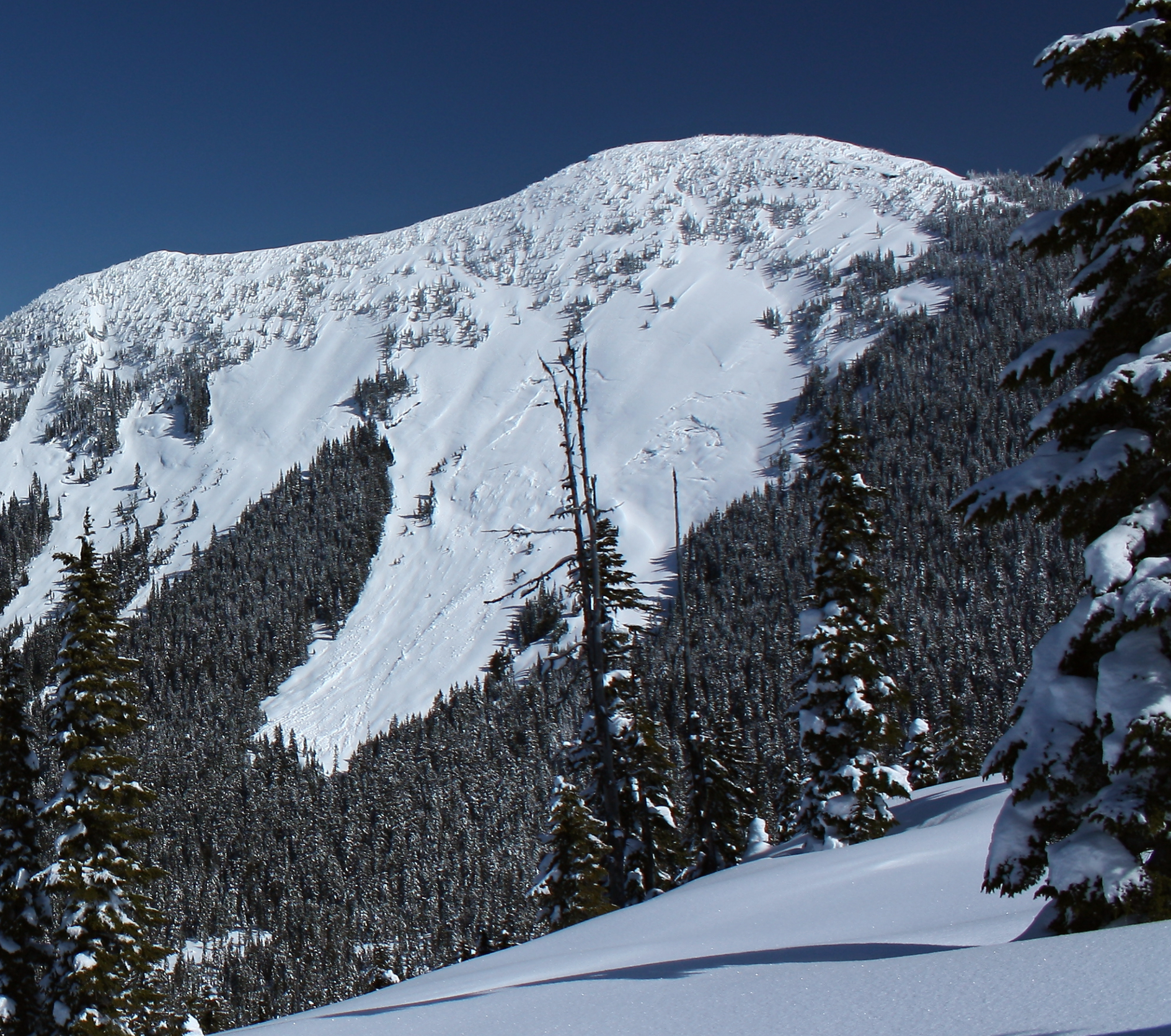
- Zupjok Peak, south aspect

Highest point
- Elevation: 1,835 m (6,020 ft)
- Prominence: 110 m (360 ft)
- Parent peak: Alpaca Peak (2083 m)
- Listing: Mountains of British Columbia
- Coordinates: 49°37′01″N 121°09′19″W

Geography
- Location within British Columbia Location within Canada
- Interactive map of Zupjok Peak
- Location: British Columbia, Canada
- Parent range: North Cascades
- Topo map: NTS 92H11 Spuzzum

Climbing
- Easiest route: Off-trail hiking via south slope

Zupjok Peak is a 1,835-metre (6,020-foot) mountain summit located along the northwestern boundary of the Coquihalla Summit Recreation Area, in the North Cascades of southwestern British Columbia, Canada. It is situated north of the Coquihalla Highway, west of Zopkios Ridge, 6 km (4 mi) west of Coquihalla Summit, and 4 km (2 mi) south of Alpaca Peak. Precipitation runoff from the peak drains into headwaters of the Coldwater River, as well as tributaries of the Coquihalla River and Anderson River. The mountain was named for the zupjok, (pronounced ZOOP yok), the male progeny of a cattle bull and a female yak, and part of the ungulate names theme for several other nearby peaks that were submitted by Philip Kubik of Vancouver. The mountain's name was officially adopted on February 5, 1976, by the Geographical Names Board of Canada.

== Geology ==
During the Pleistocene period dating back over two million years ago, glaciation advancing and retreating repeatedly scoured the landscape leaving deposits of rock debris. The U-shaped cross section of the river valleys is a result of recent glaciation. Uplift and faulting in combination with glaciation have been the dominant processes which have created the tall peaks and deep valleys of the North Cascades area.

The North Cascades features some of the most rugged topography in the Cascade Range with craggy peaks and ridges, deep glacial valleys, and granite spires. Geological events occurring many years ago created the diverse topography and drastic elevation changes over the Cascade Range leading to various climate differences which lead to vegetation variety defining the ecoregions in this area.

== Climate ==
Based on the Köppen climate classification, Zupjok Peak is located in the marine west coast climate zone of western North America. Most weather fronts originate in the Pacific Ocean, and travel east toward the Cascade Range where they are forced upward by the range (Orographic lift), causing them to drop their moisture in the form of rain or snowfall. As a result, the Cascade Mountains experience high precipitation, especially during the winter months in the form of snowfall. Temperatures can drop below −20 °C with wind chill factors below −30 °C. The months July through September offer the most favorable weather for climbing Zupjok Peak.

== See also ==
- Geography of the North Cascades
- Geology of British Columbia
