= Gamuza Peak =

Mountain in the country of Canada

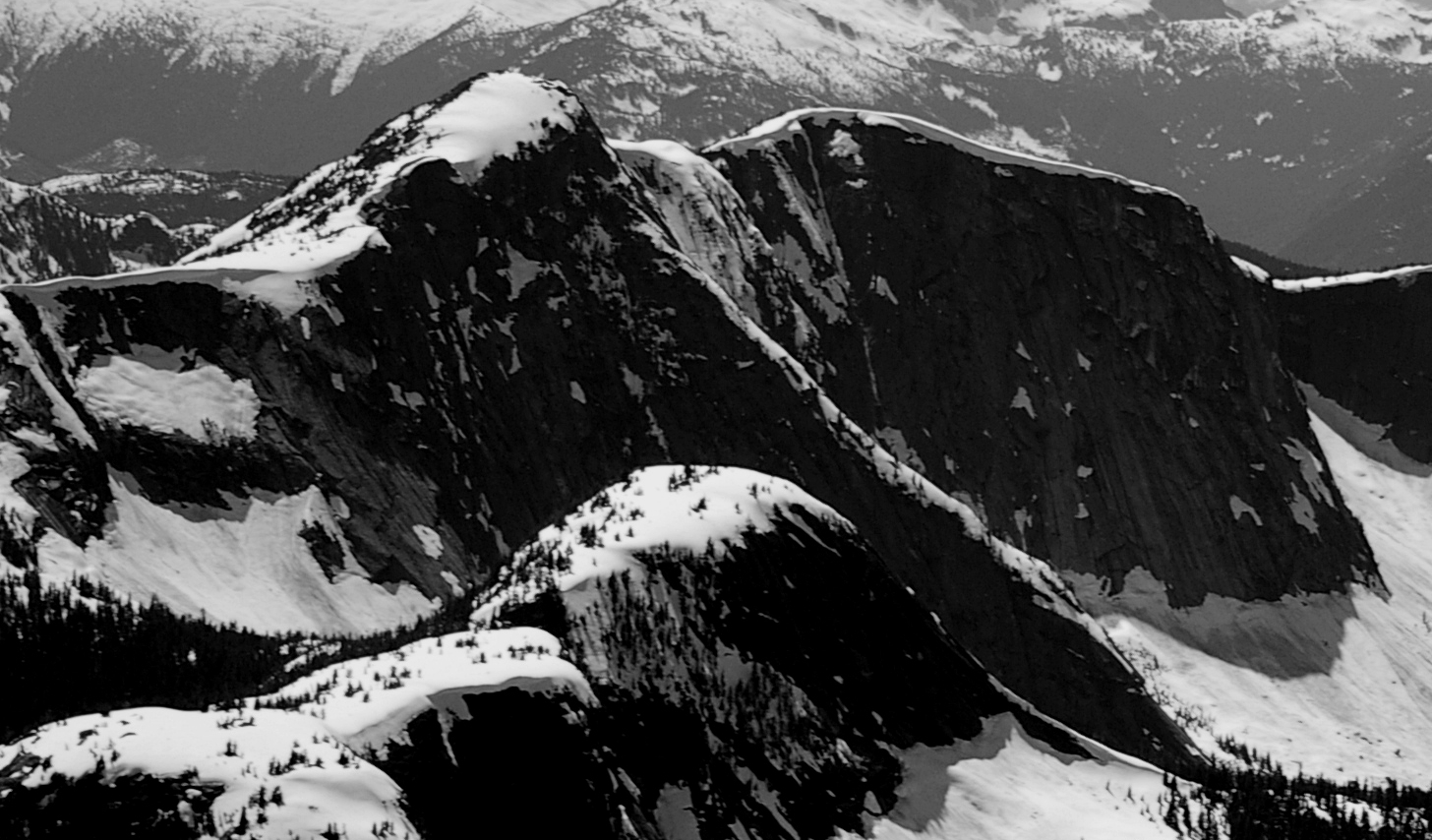
- Gamuza Peak seen from Alpaca Peak

Highest point
- Elevation: 1,944 m (6,378 ft)
- Prominence: 194 m (636 ft)
- Parent peak: Steinbok Peak (2127 m)
- Listing: Mountains of British Columbia
- Coordinates: 49°38′07″N 121°14′15″W

Geography
- Location within British Columbia Location within Canada
- Interactive map of Gamuza Peak
- Location: British Columbia, Canada
- District: Yale Division Yale Land District
- Parent range: North Cascades
- Topo map: NTS 92H11 Spuzzum

Climbing
- First ascent: 1976 by Philip Kubik, Grant McCormack
- Easiest route: Scramble via south slope

Gamuza Peak, is a 1,944-metre (6,378-foot) granitic mountain summit located in the North Cascades of southwestern British Columbia, Canada. It is situated 12 km (7 mi) west-northwest of Coquihalla Summit, and its nearest higher peak is Steinbok Peak, 1.3 km (1 mi) to the northwest. Precipitation runoff from the peak drains into tributaries of the Anderson River. The mountain was named for the gamuza, the Spanish name for the Pyrenean chamois, as part of the ungulate theme for several other nearby peaks that were submitted by Philip Kubik of the first ascent party. The mountain's name was officially adopted on February 5, 1976, by the Geographical Names Board of Canada.

== Geology ==
The history of the formation of the Cascade Mountains dates back millions of years ago to the late Eocene Epoch. With the North American Plate overriding the Pacific Plate, episodes of volcanic igneous activity persisted. In addition, small fragments of the oceanic and continental lithosphere called terranes created the North Cascades about 50 million years ago.

During the Pleistocene period dating back over two million years ago, glaciation advancing and retreating repeatedly scoured the landscape. The U-shaped cross section of the river valleys is a result of recent glaciation. Uplift and faulting in combination with glaciation have been the dominant processes which have created the tall peaks and deep valleys of the North Cascades area.

The North Cascades features some of the most rugged topography in the Cascade Range with craggy peaks and ridges, deep glacial valleys, and granite spires. Geological events occurring many years ago created the diverse topography and drastic elevation changes over the Cascade Range leading to various climate differences which lead to vegetation variety defining the ecoregions in this area.

== Climate ==
Based on the Köppen climate classification, Gamuza Peak is located in the marine west coast climate zone of western North America. Most weather fronts originate in the Pacific Ocean, and travel east toward the Cascade Range where they are forced upward by the range (Orographic lift), causing them to drop their moisture in the form of rain or snowfall. As a result, the Cascade Mountains experience high precipitation, especially during the winter months in the form of snowfall. Temperatures can drop below −20 °C with wind chill factors below −30 °C. The months July through September offer the most favorable weather for climbing Gamuza Peak.

== Climbing Routes ==
Established climbing routes on Gamuza Peak:

- West Ridge - class 3 First ascent 1976
- North Ridge/NW Arête - class 5 FA 1976
- East Ridge - class 3 FA 1976
- Backslide Buttress - class 5.6+ FA 2002
- South Slopes- class 3

== See also ==
- Geography of the North Cascades
- Geology of British Columbia
