= Yak Peak =

Mountain in British Columbia, Canada

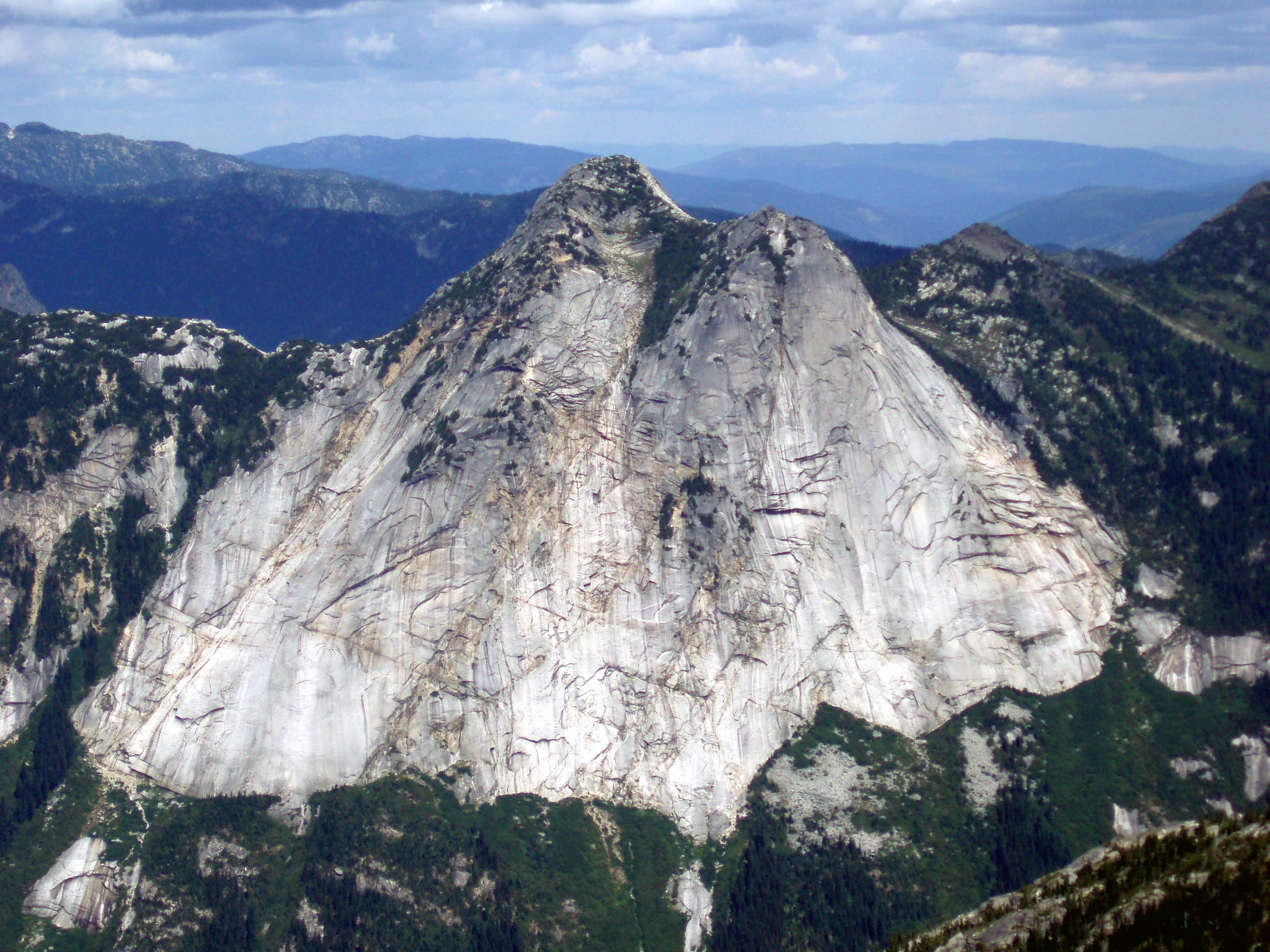
- Yak Peak from Needle Peak

Highest point
- Elevation: 2,039 m (6,690 ft)
- Prominence: 500 m (1,600 ft)
- Parent peak: Vicuna Peak (2126 m)
- Listing: Mountains of British Columbia
- Coordinates: 49°36′24″N 121°06′19″W

Geography
- Location within British Columbia
- Location: British Columbia, Canada
- District: Yale Division Yale Land District
- Parent range: North Cascades
- Topo map: NTS 92H11 Spuzzum

Climbing
- First ascent: Possibly C.E. Cairnes or George Dawson c. 1906
- Easiest route: Scramble via the NE Ridge

Yak Peak is a granite summit located adjacent the Coquihalla Highway in British Columbia north of Hope. The mountain lies less than one km from a highway rest area, and is easily visible from a long stretch of the highway just south of the summit. It is known for some fine granite rock climbing routes, notably Yak Crack. Other mountains in the same group, usually known as the Anderson River Group or as the Coquihalla Range, are named after other similar animals, such as Thar Peak and Guanaco Peak.

== Climate ==
Based on the Köppen climate classification, Yak Peak is located in the marine west coast climate zone of western North America. Most weather fronts originate in the Pacific Ocean, and travel east toward the Cascade Range where they are forced upward by the range, causing them to drop their moisture in the form of rain or snowfall. As a result, the Cascade Mountains experience high precipitation, especially during the winter months in the form of snowfall. Winter temperatures can drop below −20 °C with wind chill factors below −30 °C. The months July through September offer the most favorable weather for climbing Yak Peak.

== Gallery ==
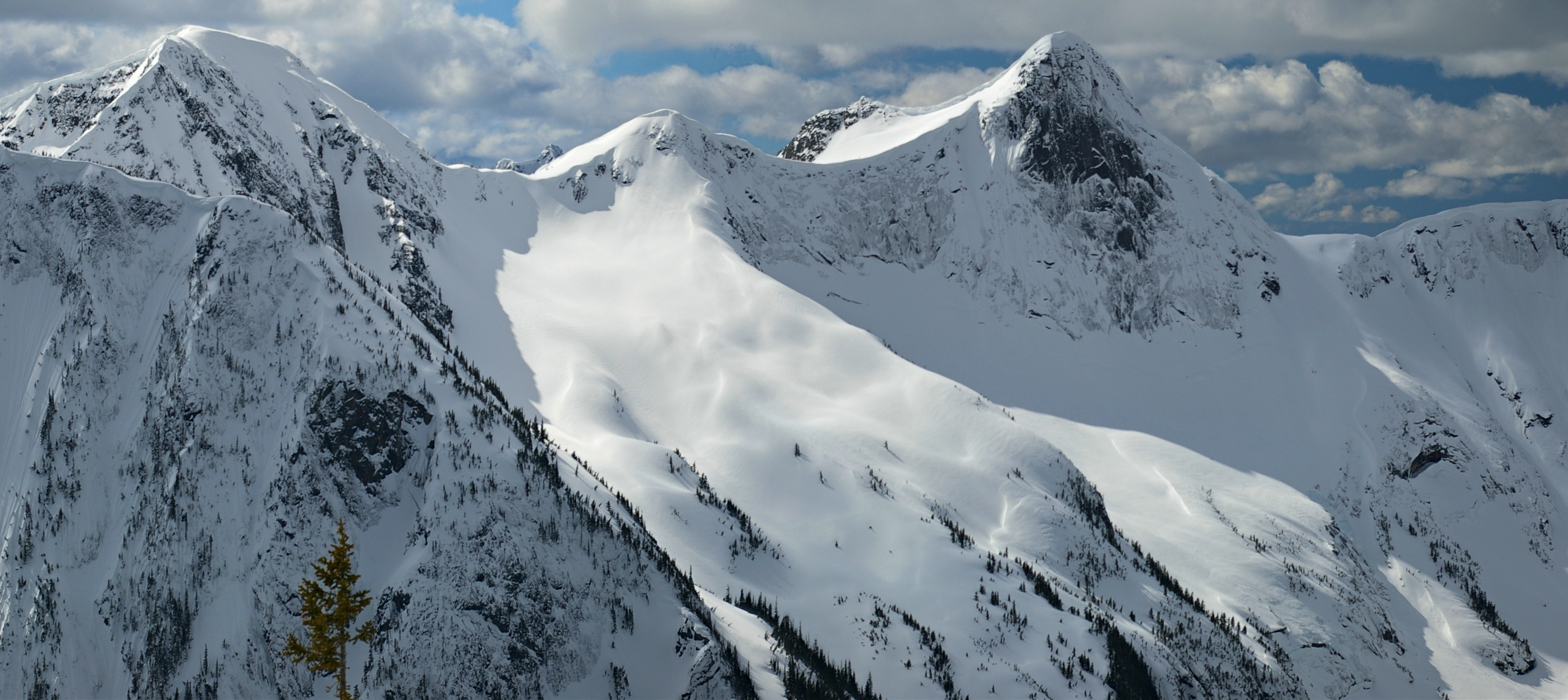
The north aspect of Yak Peak, with Nak Peak in upper left

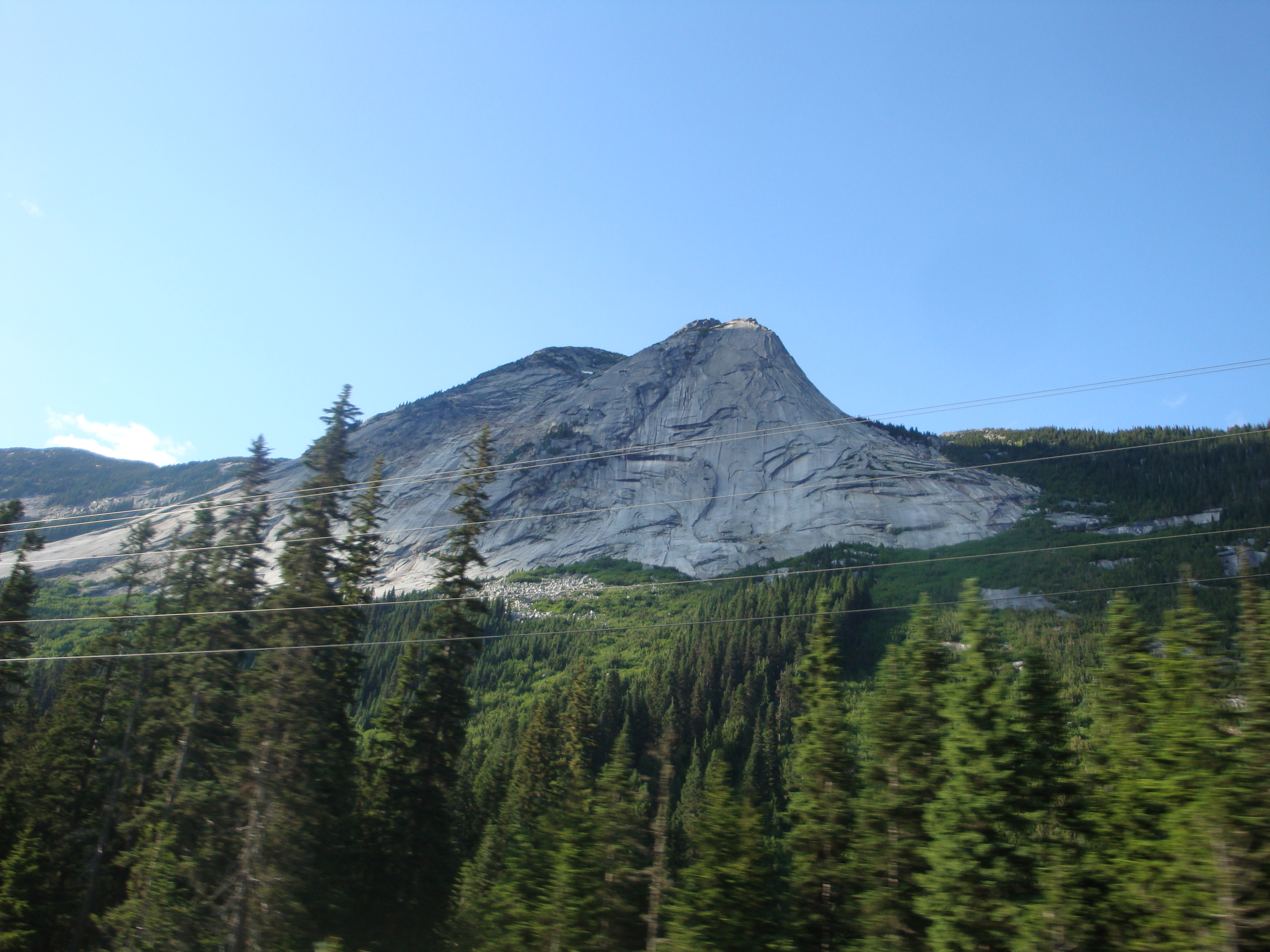
Yak Peak seen from the Coquihalla Highway near the Coquihalla Summit Recreation Area
