= Needle Peak (British Columbia) =

Mountain in British Columbia, Canada

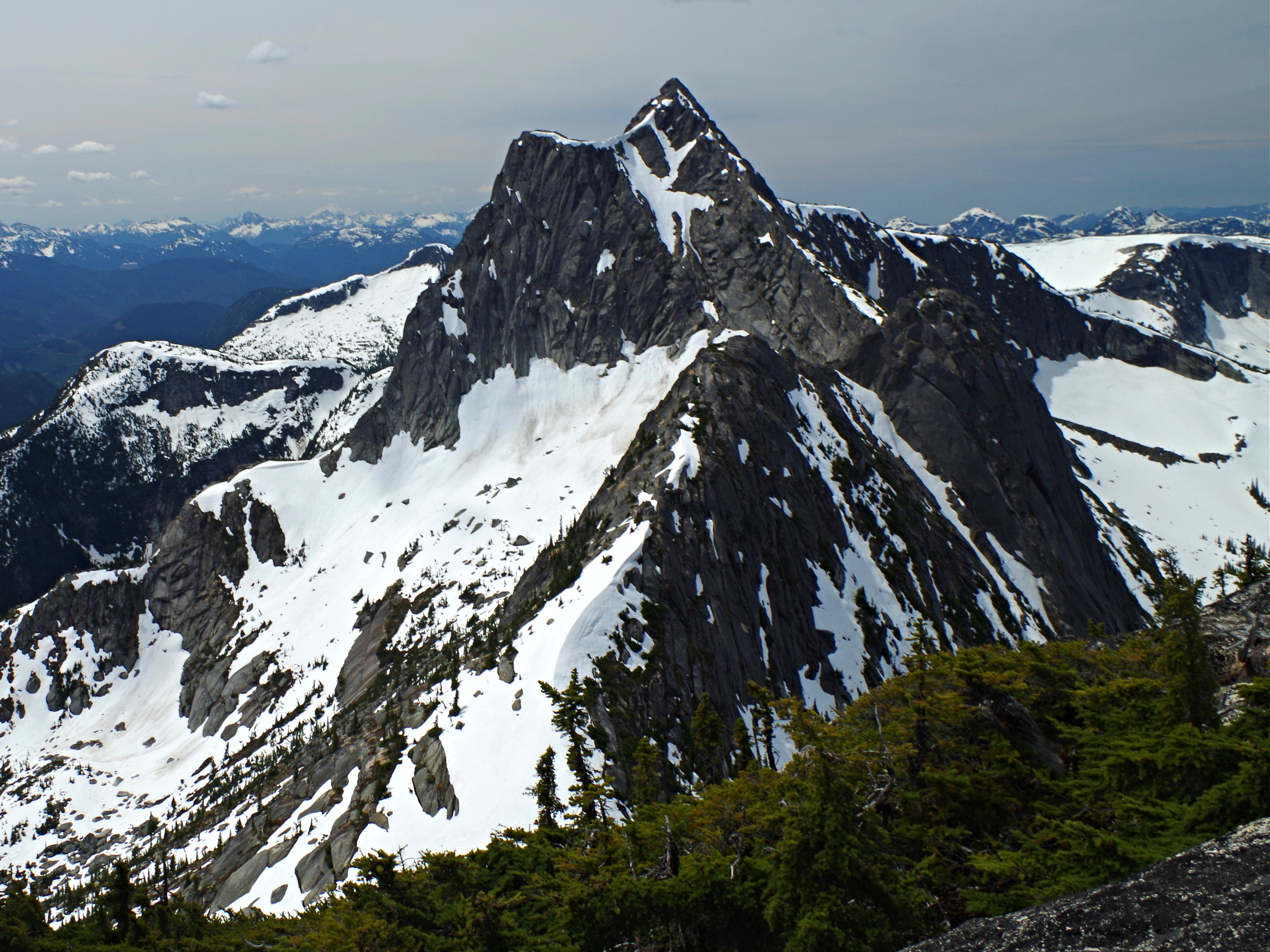
- Needle Peak, northeast aspect

Highest point
- Elevation: 2,095 m (6,873 ft)
- Prominence: 865 m (2,838 ft)
- Parent peak: Coquihalla Mountain (2157 m)
- Listing: Mountains of British Columbia
- Coordinates: 49°34′15″N 121°07′31″W

Geography
- Location within British Columbia Location within Canada
- Interactive map of Needle Peak
- Location: British Columbia, Canada
- District: Yale Division Yale Land District
- Parent range: North Cascades
- Topo map: NTS 92H11 Spuzzum

Geology
- Rock type: granitic

Climbing
- Easiest route: Easy scrambling via west ridge

Needle Peak is a prominent 2,095-metre (6,873-foot) mountain summit located in the Coquihalla Summit Recreation Area, in the North Cascades of southwestern British Columbia, Canada. It is situated immediately southwest of Coquihalla Summit, and 4.2 km (3 mi) south-southwest of Yak Peak. Due to its close proximity to the Coquihalla Highway, the mountain is a popular hiking destination in summer, and skiing and snowshoeing in winter. Precipitation runoff from the peak drains into tributaries of the Coquihalla River. The mountain's descriptive name was officially adopted on October 6, 1936, by the Geographical Names Board of Canada.

== Geology ==
During the Pleistocene period dating back over two million years ago, glaciation advancing and retreating repeatedly scoured the landscape leaving deposits of rock debris. The U-shaped cross section of the river valleys is a result of recent glaciation. Uplift and faulting in combination with glaciation have been the dominant processes which have created the tall peaks and deep valleys of the North Cascades area.

The North Cascades features some of the most rugged topography in the Cascade Range with craggy peaks and ridges, deep glacial valleys, and granite spires. Geological events occurring many years ago created the diverse topography and drastic elevation changes over the Cascade Range leading to various climate differences which lead to vegetation variety defining the ecoregions in this area.

== Climate ==
Based on the Köppen climate classification, Needle Peak is located in the marine west coast climate zone of western North America. Most weather fronts originate in the Pacific Ocean, and travel east toward the Cascade Range where they are forced upward by the range (Orographic lift), causing them to drop their moisture in the form of rain or snowfall. As a result, the Cascade Mountains experience high precipitation, especially during the winter months in the form of snowfall. Temperatures can drop below −20 °C (−4 °F) with wind chill factors below −30 °C (−22 °F). The months July through September offer the most favorable weather for climbing Needle Peak.

== Climbing Routes ==
Established climbing routes on Needle Peak:

- West Ridge - class 3 Trail hiking and easy scrambling
- South Face - class 3
- Northeast Ridge - class 4
- Southeast Buttress - class 5.9

== Gallery ==
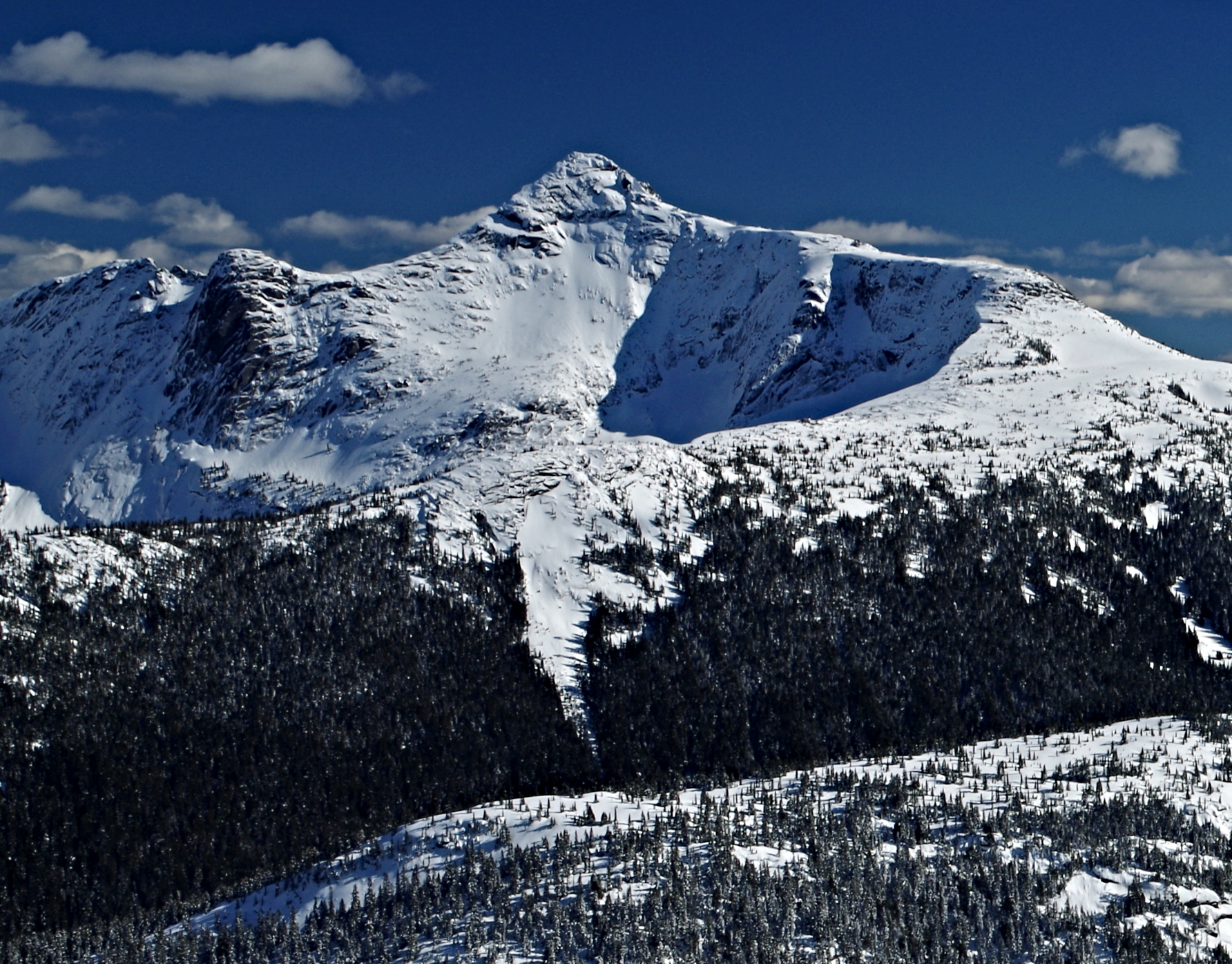
Needle Peak in winter

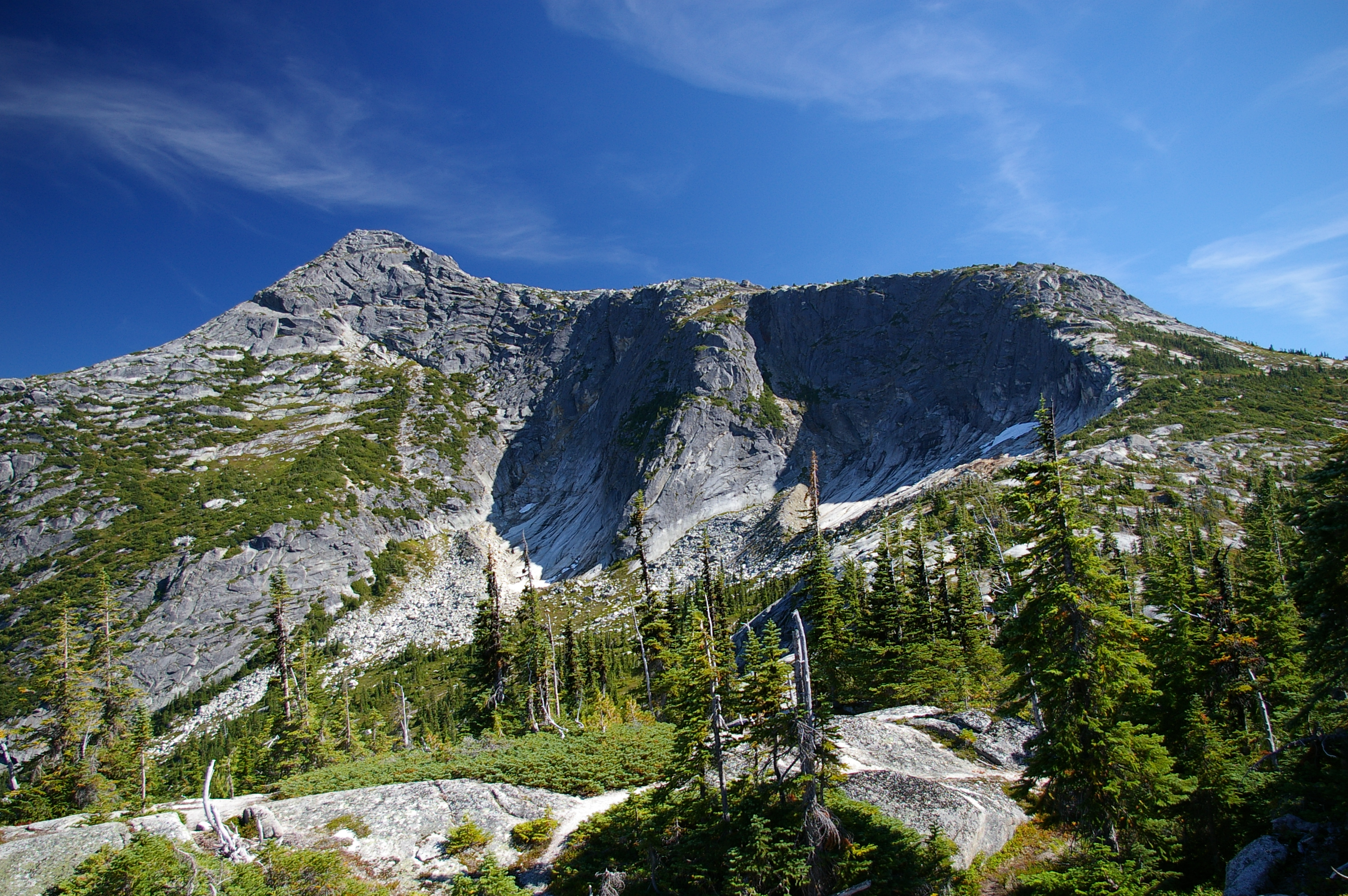
Needle Peak via west ridge

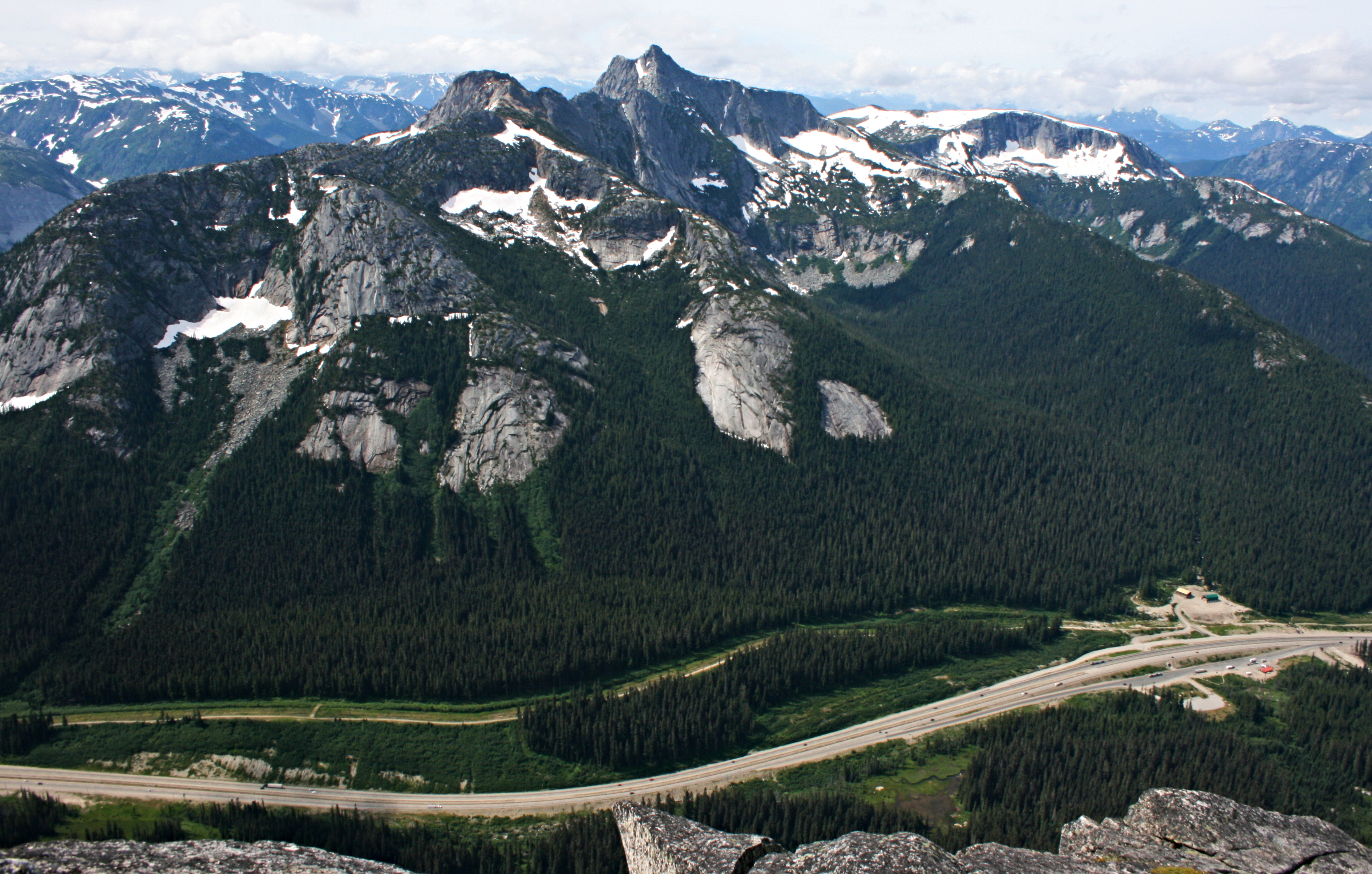
Needle Peak viewed from Yak Peak, with the Coquihalla Highway below

== See also ==
- Geography of the North Cascades
- Geology of British Columbia
