= Thar Peak =

Mountain in British Columbia, Canada

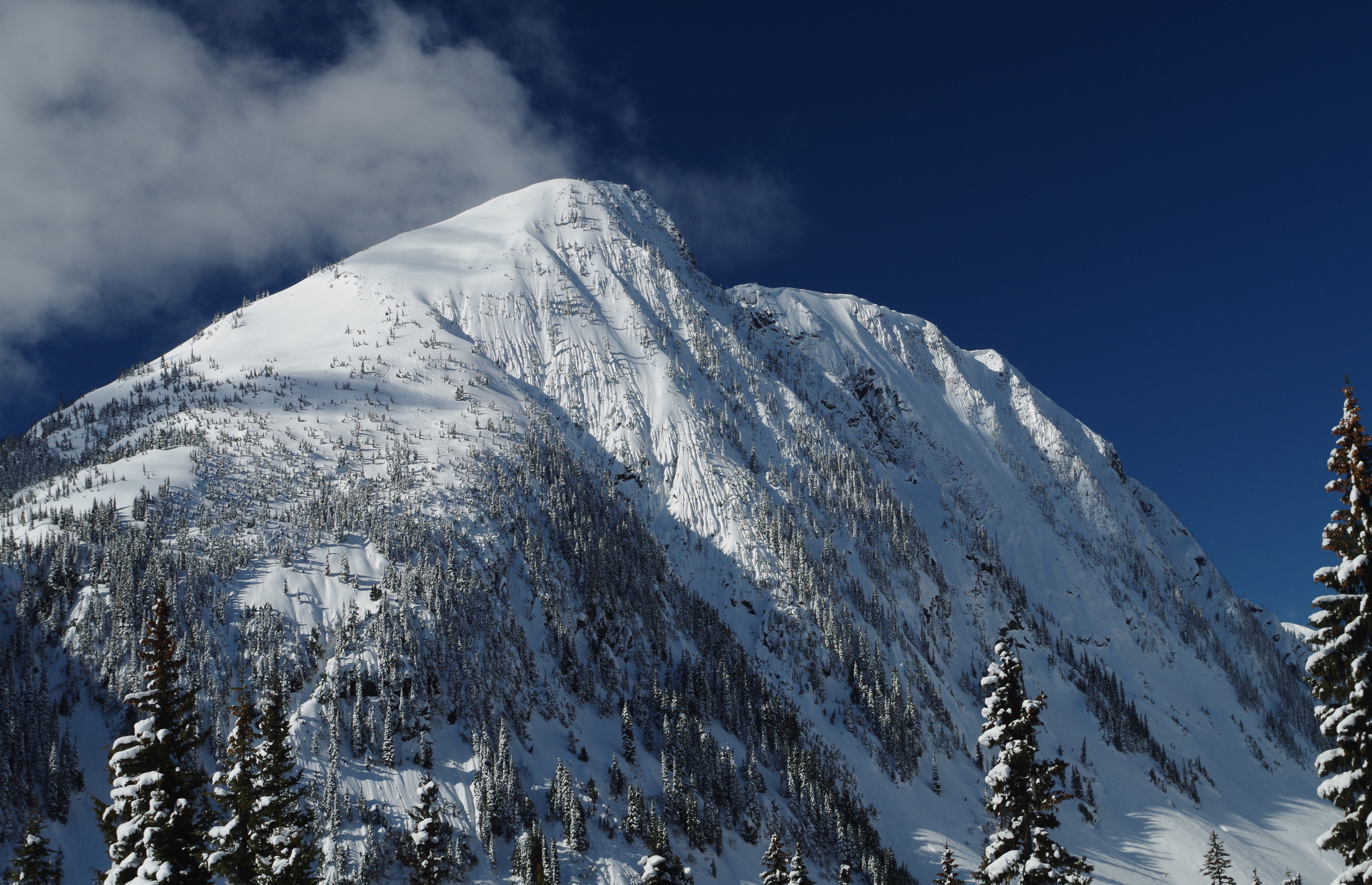
- Thar Peak, northeast aspect

Highest point
- Elevation: 1,940 m (6,360 ft)
- Prominence: 110 m (360 ft)
- Parent peak: Nak Peak (2009 m)
- Listing: Mountains of British Columbia
- Coordinates: 49°36′39″N 121°05′04″W

Geography
- Location within British Columbia Location within Canada
- Interactive map of Thar Peak
- Location: British Columbia, Canada
- District: Yale Division Yale Land District
- Parent range: North Cascades
- Topo map: NTS 92H11 Spuzzum

Geology
- Rock type: diorite

Climbing
- Easiest route: Off-trail hiking via south slope

Thar Peak is a 1,940-metre (6,360-foot) mountain summit located in the Coquihalla Summit Recreation Area, in the North Cascades of southwestern British Columbia, Canada. It is situated at the east end of Zopkios Ridge, immediately west of the Falls Lake exit at Coquihalla Summit, and 1.55 km (1 mi) east of Yak Peak. Due to its close proximity to the Coquihalla Highway, the mountain attracts skiers to its slopes in winter. Precipitation runoff from the peak drains into tributaries of the Coquihalla River. The mountain was named for the thar, a Himalayan animal, and part of the ungulate names theme for several other nearby peaks that were submitted by Philip Kubik of Vancouver. The mountain's name was officially adopted on February 5, 1976, by the Geographical Names Board of Canada.

== Geology ==
During the Pleistocene period dating back over two million years ago, glaciation advancing and retreating repeatedly scoured the landscape leaving deposits of rock debris. The U-shaped cross section of the river valleys is a result of recent glaciation. Uplift and faulting in combination with glaciation have been the dominant processes which have created the tall peaks and deep valleys of the North Cascades area.

The North Cascades features some of the most rugged topography in the Cascade Range with craggy peaks and ridges, deep glacial valleys, and granite spires. Geological events occurring many years ago created the diverse topography and drastic elevation changes over the Cascade Range leading to various climate differences which lead to vegetation variety defining the ecoregions in this area.

== Climate ==
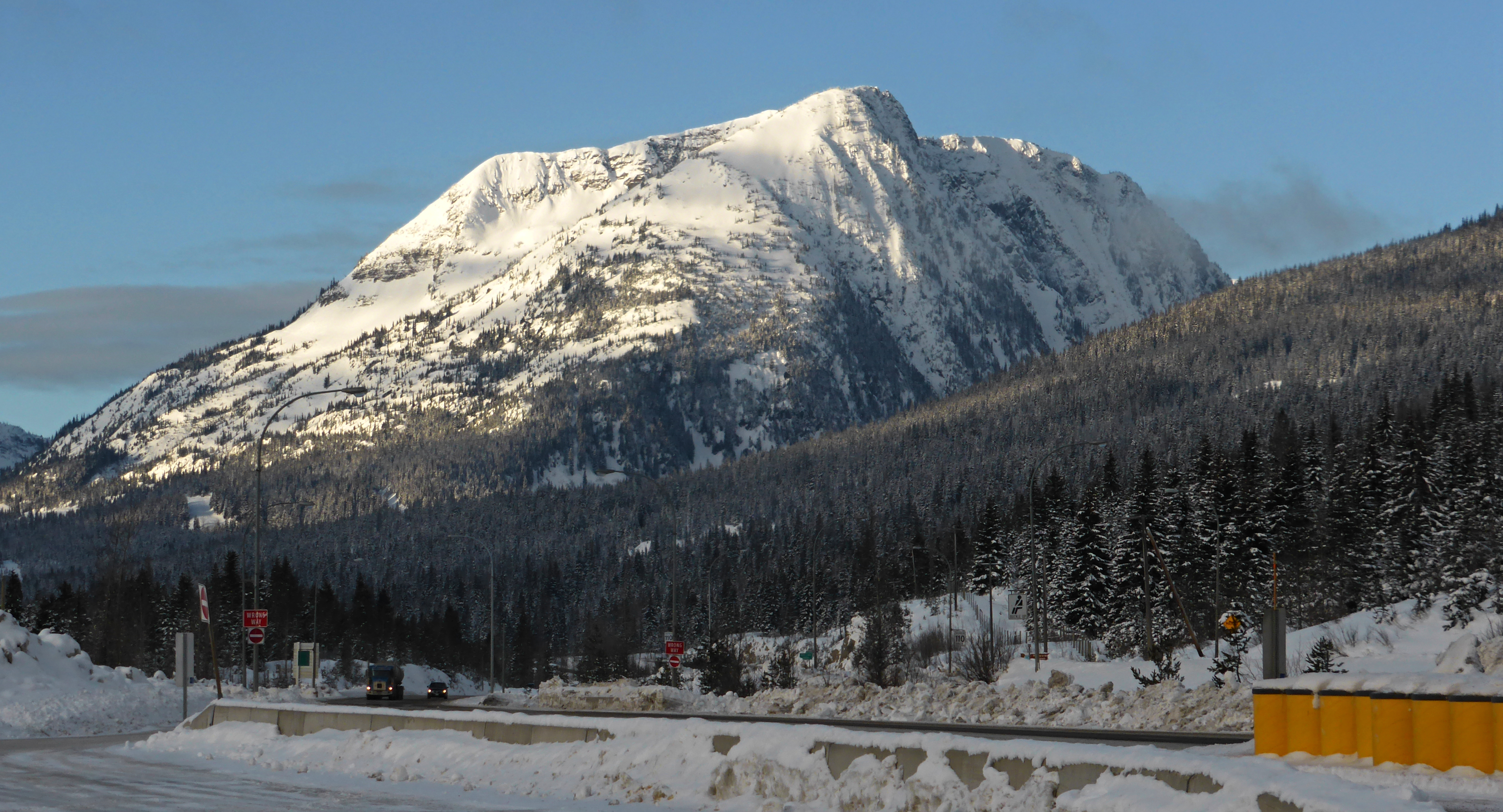
Thar Peak from Coquihalla Highway

Based on the Köppen climate classification, Thar Peak is located in the marine west coast climate zone of western North America. Most weather fronts originate in the Pacific Ocean, and travel east toward the Cascade Range where they are forced upward by the range (Orographic lift), causing them to drop their moisture in the form of rain or snowfall. As a result, the Cascade Mountains experience high precipitation, especially during the winter months in the form of snowfall. Temperatures can drop below −20 °C with wind chill factors below −30 °C. The months July through September offer the most favorable weather for climbing Thar Peak.

== Climbing Routes ==
Established climbing routes on Thar Peak:

- East Ridge - class 2 Off-trail hiking, easy scrambling
- South Slope - Off-trail hiking
- Northeast Face - class 5, First ascent 1998
- North Couloir - steep snow, First ascent 2005

== See also ==
- Geography of the North Cascades
- Geology of British Columbia
