= Kettle River Recreation Area =

Provincial recreation area in Kootenay Boundary Regional District, British Columbia

- IUCN category II (national park)
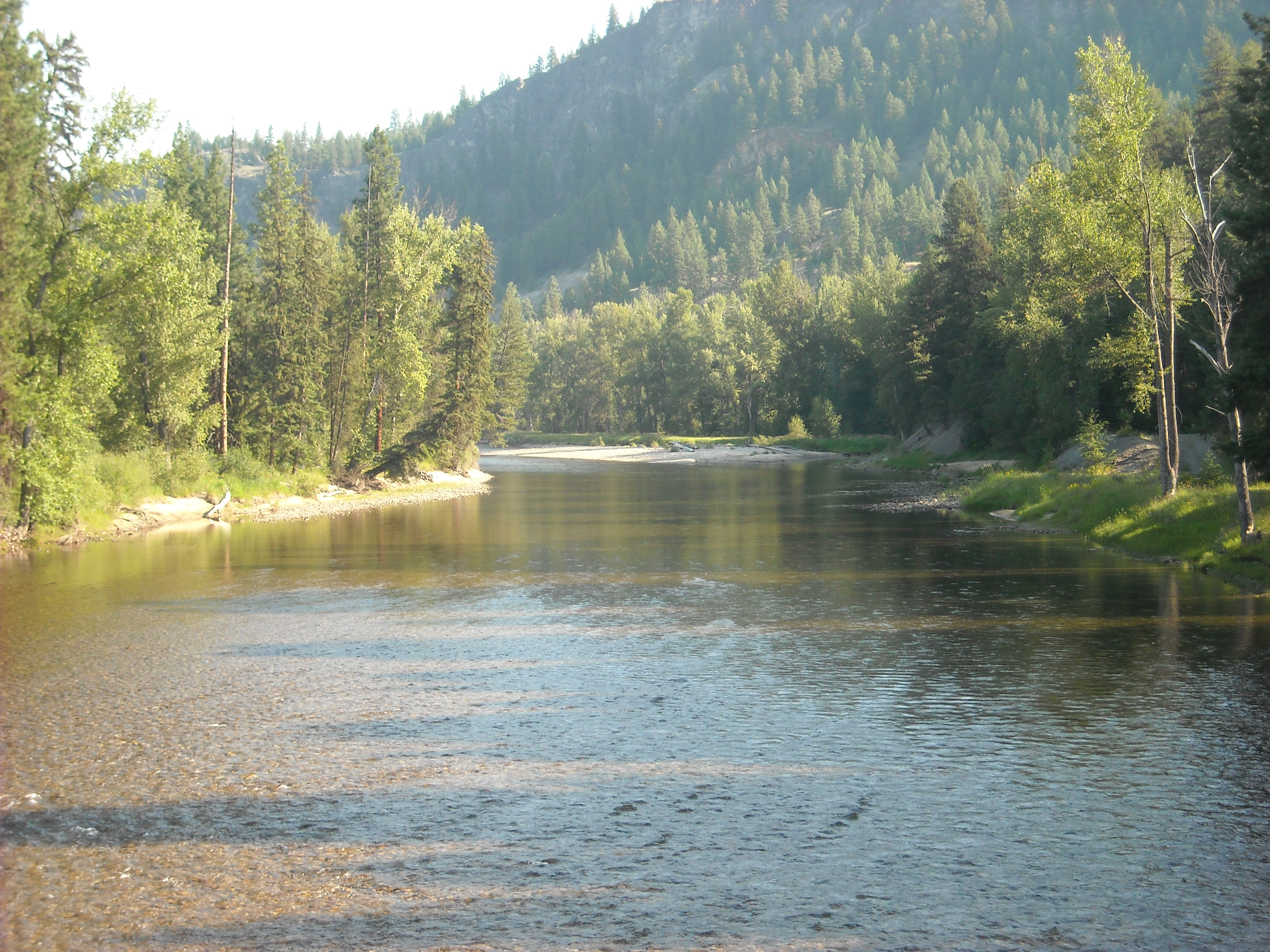
- Looking south from the KVR Bridge

- Location within British Columbia
- Location: Kootenay Boundary, British Columbia
- Nearest city: Osoyoos
- Coordinates: 49°06′27″N 118°59′14″W
- Area: 179 ha (440 acres)
- Designation: Recreation Area
- Created: 6 July 1972
- Governing body: BC Parks
- Website: bcparks.ca/explore/parkpgs/kettle_rv/

Kettle River Recreation Area is a 179 hectare provincial recreation area located inside a sharp S-bend of the Kettle River approximately 6 kilometres north of the community of Rock Creek, British Columbia. It is one of only two recreation areas in British Columbia, the other being Coquihalla Summit Recreation Area.

== Description ==
The recreation area features a public beach, a section of the Great Trail of Canada, and a historic railway bridge that has since been converted for pedestrian use. Recreational facilities include a vehicle-accessible campsite complex, pit toilets, running water, picnic tables, and fire pits. Hiking and inner tubing are popular summertime activities at this park.

The recreation area also protects a collection of old growth cottonwood and dry ponderosa pine-bunchgrass plant communities.

== History ==
In 1887, gold and silver were discovered in the region, causing thousands of American miners to flood the region in search of it. In response, the governments of British Columbia and Canada sponsored the construction of the Kettle Valley Railway to better link the region to the rest of the province. Due to the challenging topography of the region, construction of the railway took nearly 20 years, by which time the gold and silver rush had largely subsided. The railway operated through the river valley from 1915 to 1973.

Between 1979 and 1980, the railway tracks between Midway and Penticton was removed. The abandoned right-of-way would later be reused as part of the Great Trail of Canada.
