= Anderson River (British Columbia) =

River in British Columbia, Canada

Coordinates: 49°50′N 121°26′W

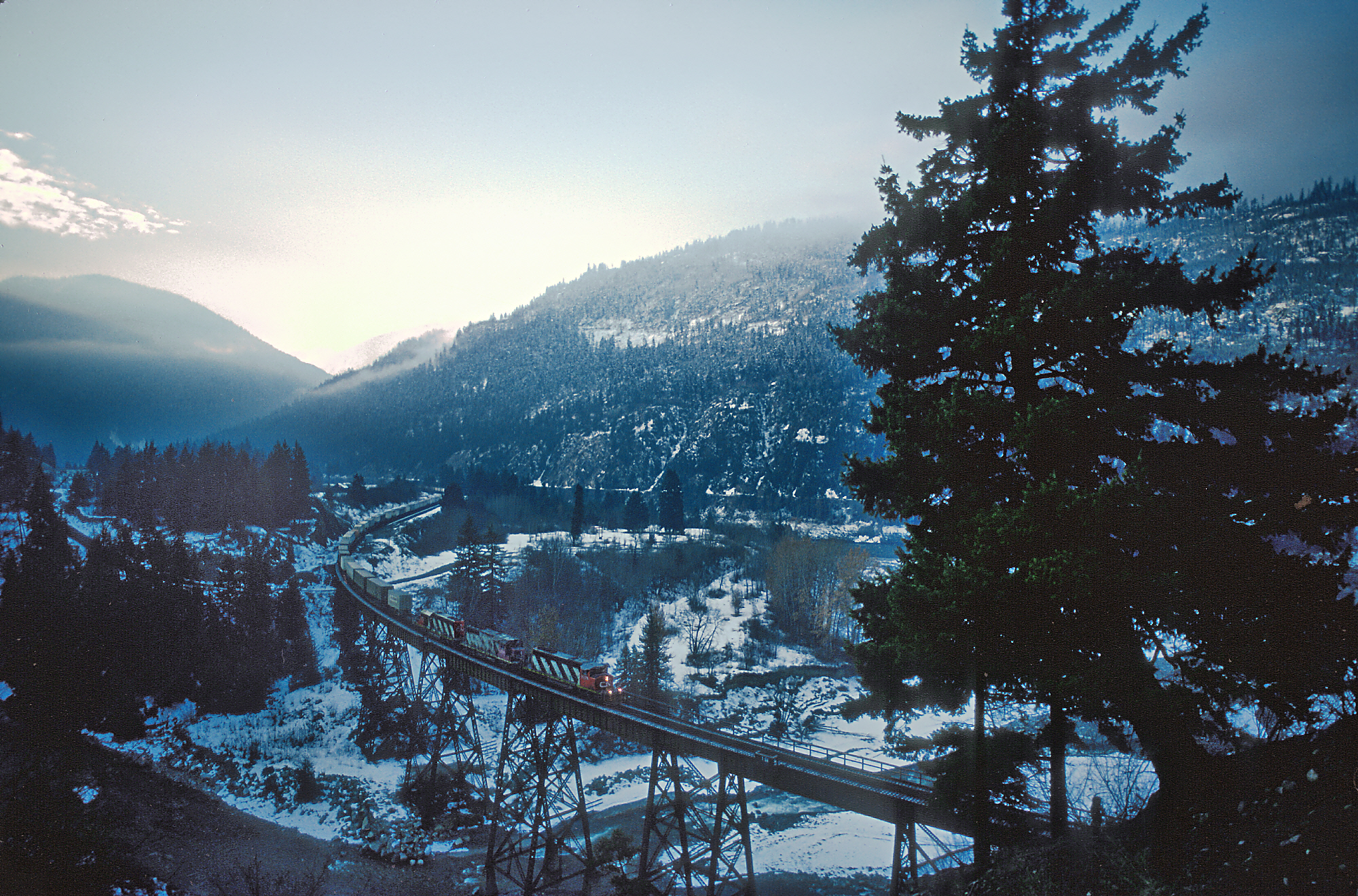
- Bridge over the Anderson River

- Location within British Columbia Location within Canada

Location
- Country: Canada
- Province: British Columbia
- District: Yale Division Yale Land District

Anderson River is a tributary of the Fraser River in the Canadian province of British Columbia.

The river is presumably named after Alexander Caulfield Anderson of the Hudson's Bay Company who travelled through the region in 1847–48.

== Course ==
The Anderson River originates near Coquihalla Pass and flows generally west and north, joining the Fraser River in the Fraser Canyon, near Boston Bar.

== See also ==
- List of rivers of British Columbia
