= Coquihalla Summit =

Mountain pass in British Columbia, Canada

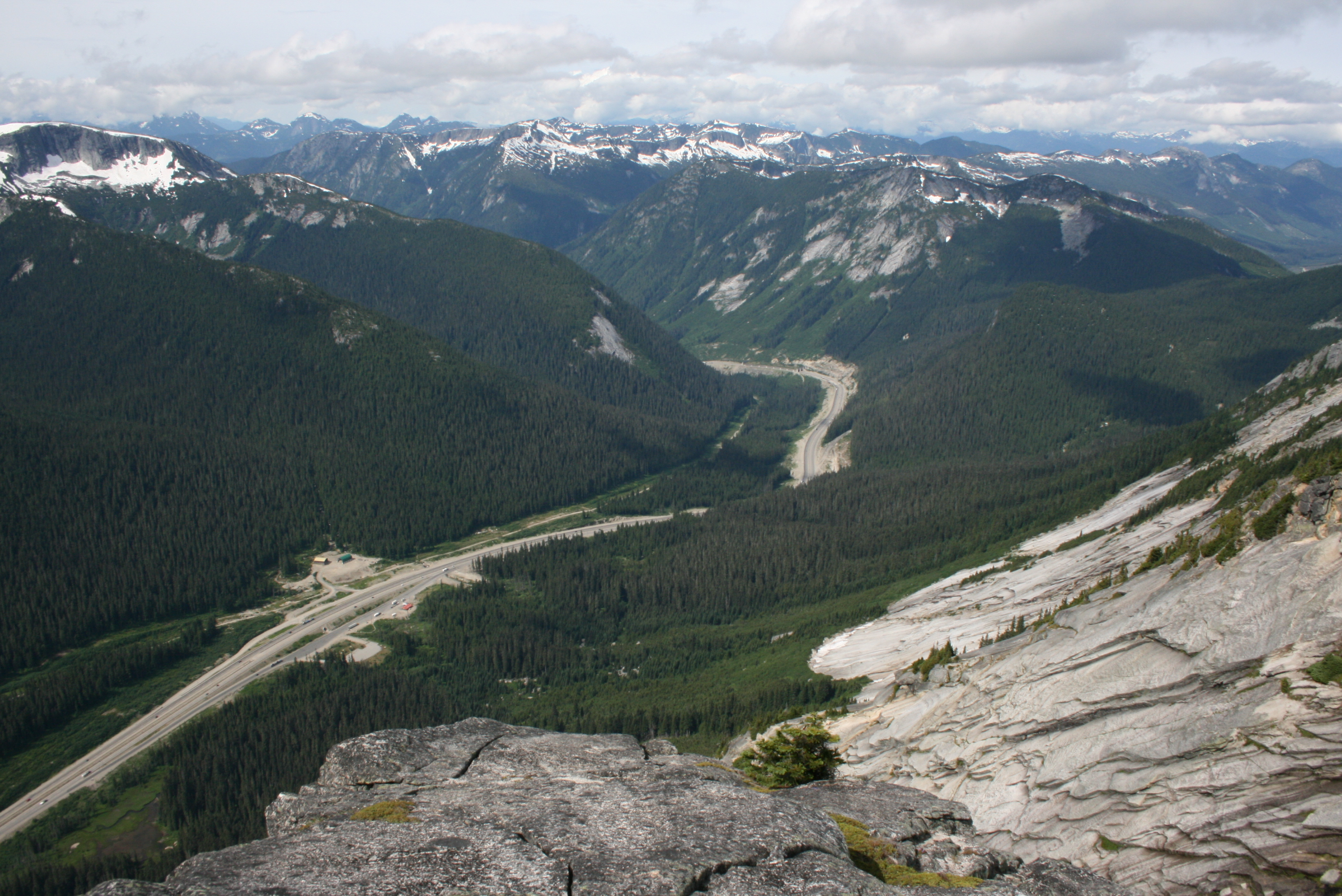
- Southern approach to Coquihalla Summit as viewed from Yak Peak

- Location within British Columbia
- Elevation: 1,244 m (4,081 ft)
- Traversed by: Highway 5 (Coquihalla Highway)

Third Approach
- Location: British Columbia, Canada
- Range: North Cascades
- Coordinates: 49°35′50.3″N 121°04′41.3″W
- Topo map: NTS 92H11 Spuzzum

Coquihalla Summit (el. 1,244 m or 4,081 ft) is a highway summit along the Coquihalla Highway in British Columbia, Canada. It is the highest point on the highway between the cities of Hope and Merritt. It is located just south of the former toll booth plaza on the Coquihalla Highway, about 50 km (31 mi) north of Hope, and 65 km (40 mi) south of Merritt and is the divide between the Coquihalla River and the Coldwater River.

Coquihalla Summit is not actually the highest point on the Coquihalla Highway, rather the Surrey Lake Summit at 1,444 m (4,738 ft) is the highest point on the Coquihalla section of Highway 5, which runs from Hope to the Highway 1 interchange outside of Kamloops.

The ascent to the Coquihalla Summit is very steep, especially from the south, and is particularly steep north of the Great Bear snow shed. The pass is named after the Coquihalla River, from which the highway also derives its name. The Coquihalla Summit Recreation Area is located at the top of the pass on the Coquihalla Highway, approximately 45 km (28 mi) north of Hope.

== History ==
Kw'ikw'iya:la (Coquihalla) in the Halq'emeylem language of the Stó:lō, is a place name meaning "stingy container." It refers to a fishing rock near the mouth of what is now known as the Coquihalla River. This rock is a good platform for spearing salmon. According to Sto;lo oral history, the skw'exweq (water babies or naiads, underwater people) who inhabit a pool close by the rock, would swim out and pull the salmon off the spears, allowing only certain fishermen to catch the salmon.

The Coquihalla Valley has long been a major transportation route from the coast to the interior. In 1876 the Hope-Nicola Trail was built. The area retains some remnants of the Kettle Valley Railway which travelled this route from early 1900s until 1961. Modern use of the pass began in 1986 after construction of the first phase of the Coquihalla Highway (from Hope to Merritt). Construction of this part of the Coquihalla Highway was spearheaded by Tom Waterland as MLA for Yale-Lillooet. His "conviction that the route provided important benefits and an essential link to B.C.'s Interior... helped to convince reluctant Cabinet members of the necessity of the third route to the Interior". After 10 years in office, Waterland retired from the Cabinet in 1986 a few months after seeing this part of the project through to its completion. Some of the old railroad grade is now part of the Trans-Canada Trail network, including the Othello Tunnels of the Coquihalla River section, which are accessible via exits from the Coquihalla Highway. A series of protected areas were established along the route in 1986.

Following nine days of snowfall in February 2014, a Class 4 avalanche occurred across the Coquihalla Highway, 33 kilometres (21 mi) north of Hope on February 20, 2014. Explosives, dropped from helicopters, and three days were needed to clear it.

== Coquihalla Summit Recreation Area ==
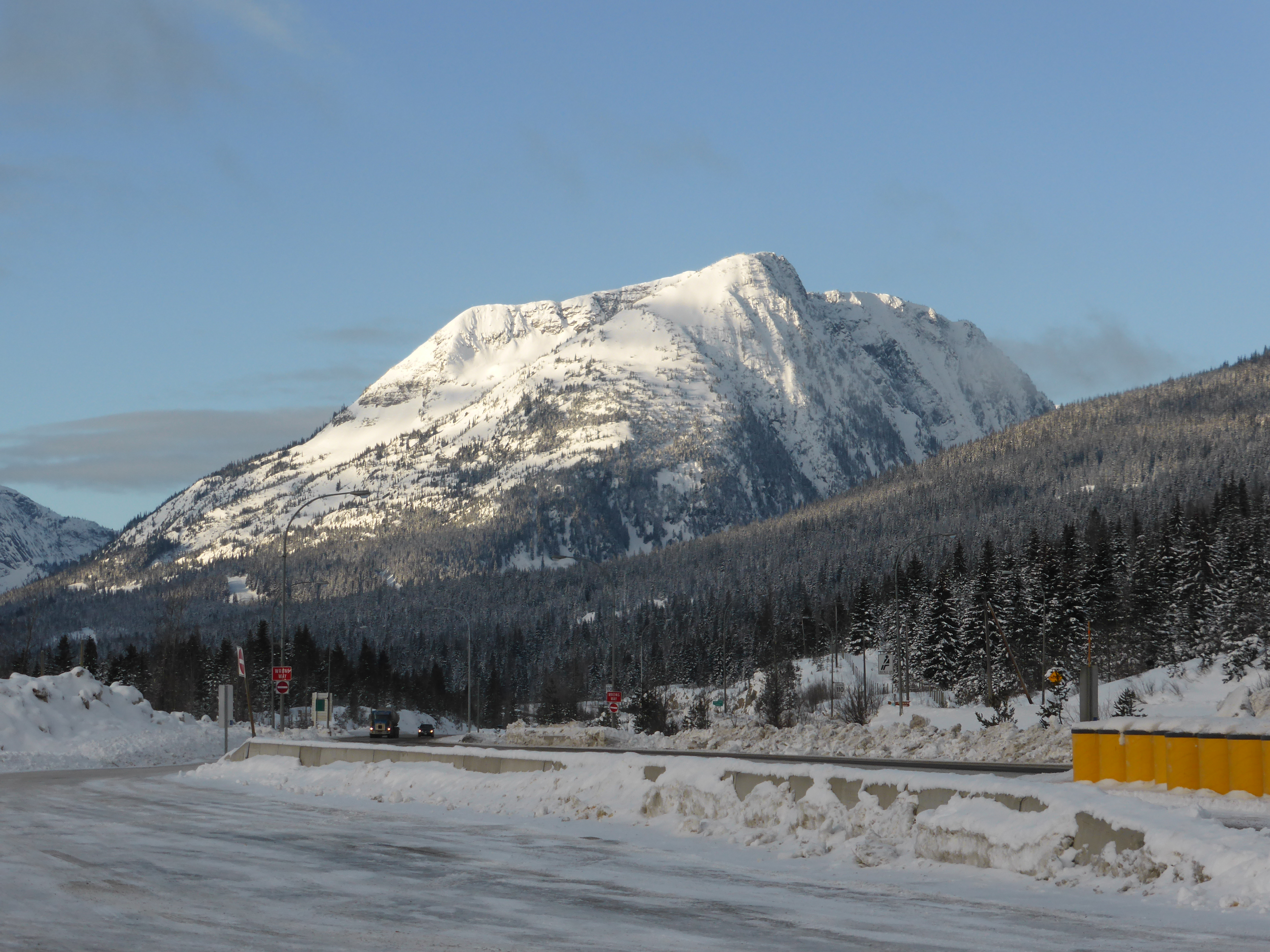
Thar Peak from Coquihalla Summit Recreation Area

Coquihalla Summit Recreation Area is a provincial recreation area centred around Coquihalla Summit. It encompasses 5,750 hectares (14,200 acres) of forested mountain slopes stretching from Portia Peak in the southwest to Coquihalla Lakes in the northeast. The recreation area was established on September 4, 1987, with the goal of protecting the transition zone between the wetter coast and drier southern interior regions of the province. It also provides highway travellers opportunities for viewing granite peaks, wildlife and historic features such as the Kettle Valley Railway and old Coquihalla Highway, both of which were earlier routes through the area.

== See also ==
- List of mountain passes of the Cascade Range
- Kettle River Recreation Area - the only other recreation area in British Columbia
