= Mount Rohr =

Mountain in British Columbia, Canada

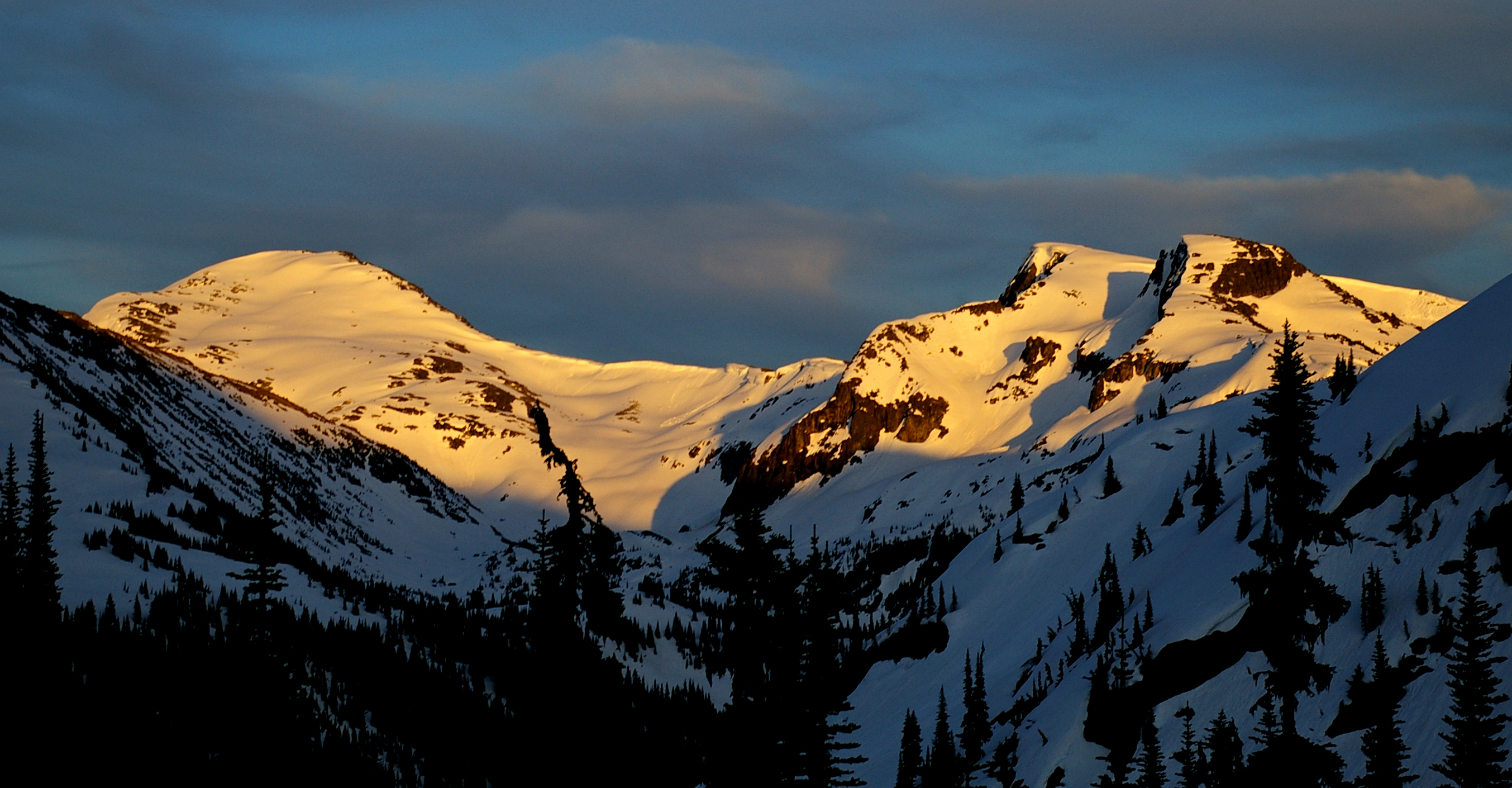
- Mount Rohr from the northwest

Highest point
- Elevation: 2,423 m (7,949 ft)
- Prominence: 353 m (1,158 ft)
- Parent peak: Mount Marriott (2735 m)
- Listing: Mountains of British Columbia
- Coordinates: 50°23′52″N 122°24′32″W

Geography
- Location within British Columbia Location within Canada
- Interactive map of Mount Rohr
- Location: British Columbia, Canada
- District: Lillooet Land District
- Parent range: Cayoosh Range; Lillooet Ranges; Coast Mountains
- Topo map: NTS 92J8 Duffey Lake

Climbing
- Easiest route: Scramble

Mount Rohr is a 2,423-metre (7,949-foot) mountain summit located in the Cayoosh Range of the Lillooet Ranges, in southwestern British Columbia, Canada. It is situated 29 km (18 mi) east of Pemberton, 8.2 km (5 mi) east of Cayoosh Mountain, and 6.8 km (4 mi) northeast of Joffre Peak, its nearest higher peak. Highway 99 traverses the southern base of the mountain between Cayoosh Pass and the west end of Duffy Lake, while Mount Chief Pascall rises on the opposite (south) side of this highway. Mount Rohr forms the westernmost boundary of Duffey Lake Provincial Park as it also represents the park's highest point . The mountain's name was submitted by Rev. Damasus Payne, a mountaineer, to honor Rev. Victor Sebastian Rohr (1873-1965), who spent 40 years in British Columbia and was a missionary to the First Nations in the region between Skookumchuck and Williams Lake. The name was officially adopted on April 21, 1966, by the Geographical Names Board of Canada. Two established climbing routes are the West Ridge and via Rohr Lake, both of which can be skied in winter. Precipitation runoff from the peak drains north into headwaters of Haylmore Creek, or south into Cayoosh Creek.

== Climate ==
Based on the Köppen climate classification, Mount Rohr is located in a subarctic climate zone of western North America. Most weather fronts originate in the Pacific Ocean, and travel east toward the Coast Mountains where they are forced upward by the range (Orographic lift), causing them to drop their moisture in the form of rain or snowfall. As a result, the Coast Mountains experience high precipitation, especially during the winter months in the form of snowfall. Winter temperatures can drop below −20 °C with wind chill factors below −30 °C. The months July through September offer the most favorable weather for climbing Mount Rohr.

== Gallery ==
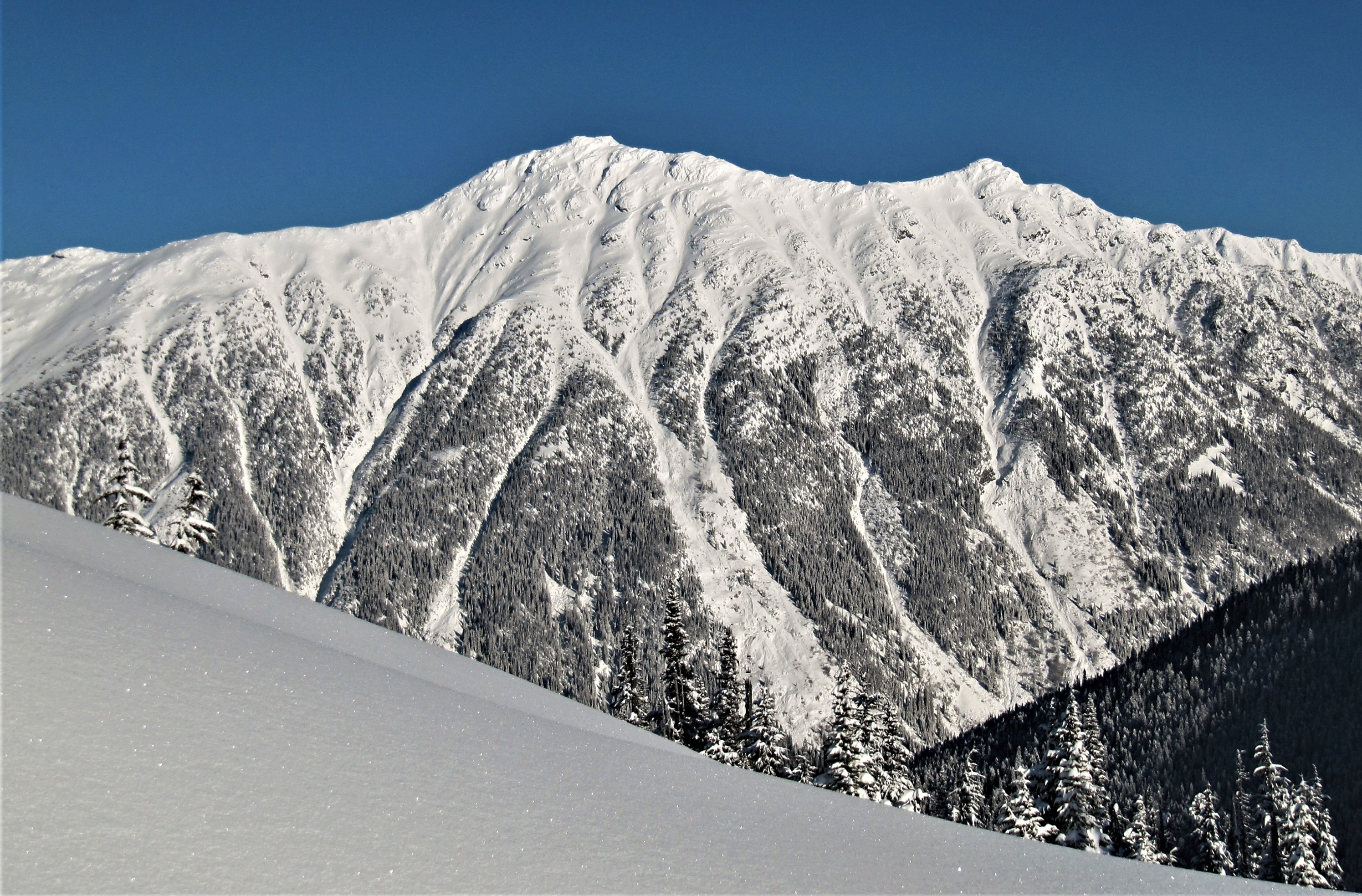
South aspect

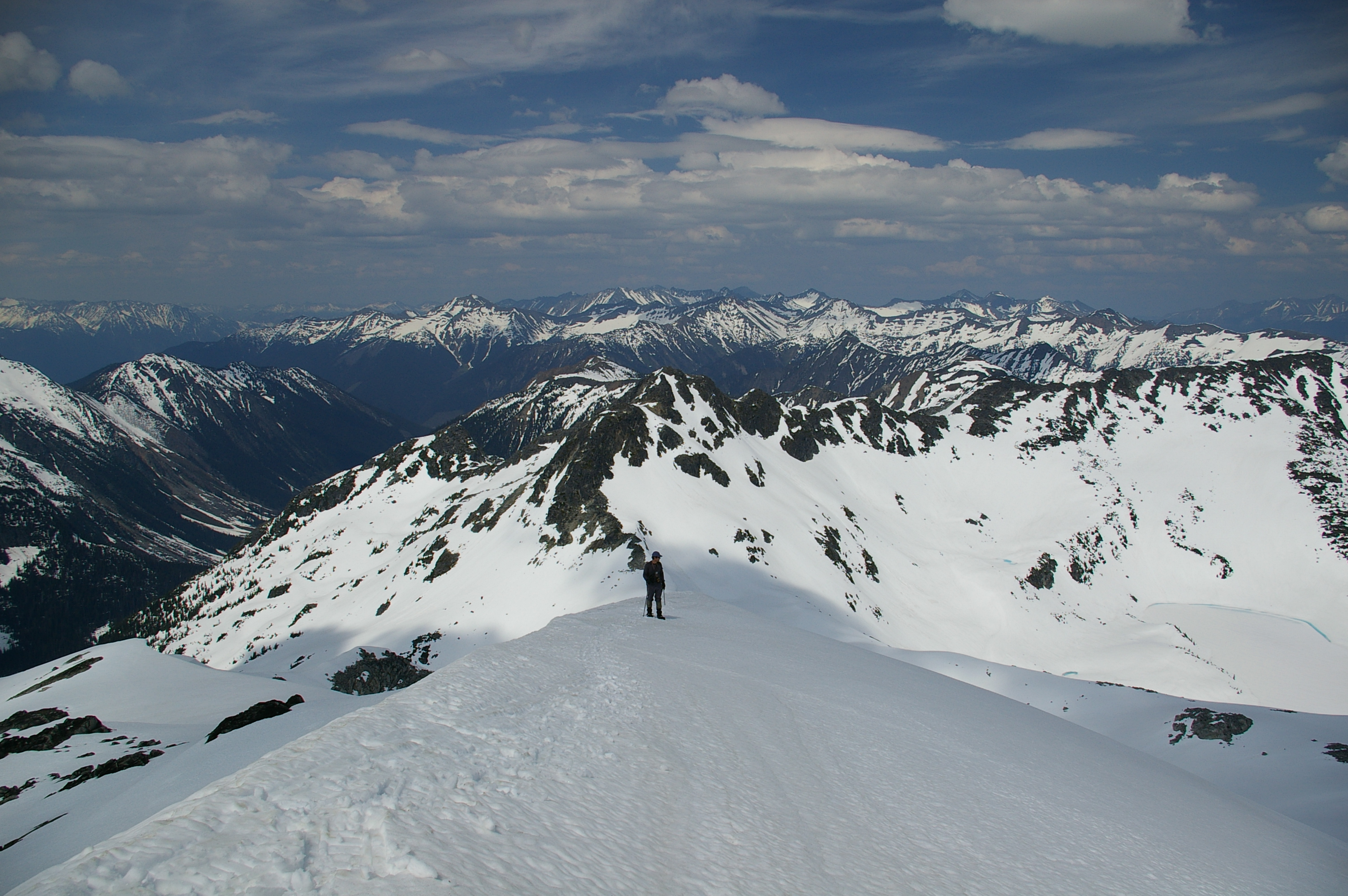
Climbing Rohr's North Ridge

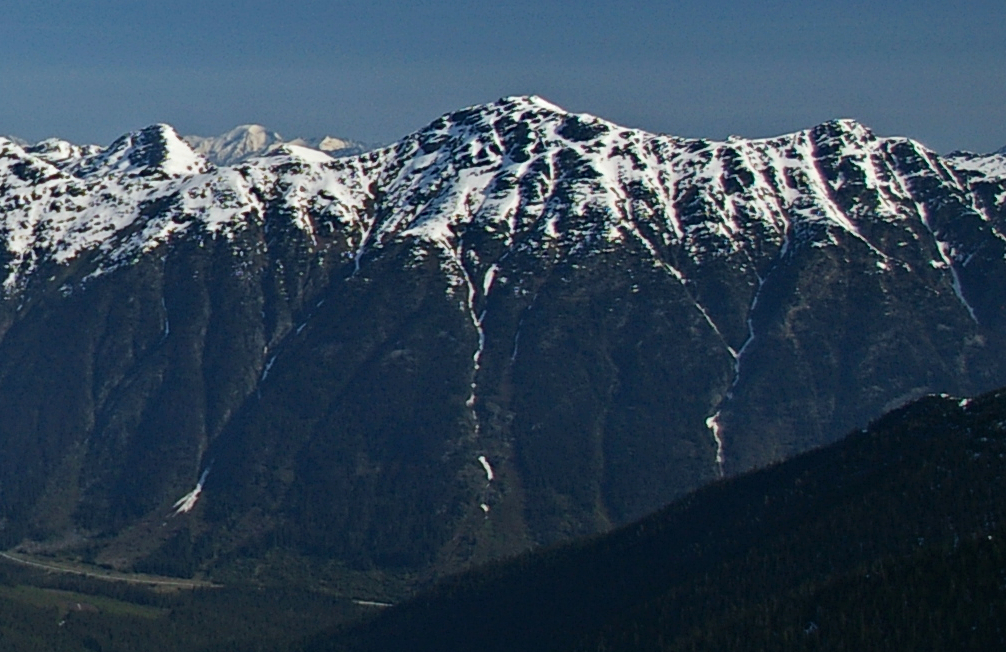
Mt. Rohr's south side, from Vantage Peak

== See also ==
- Geography of British Columbia
- Geology of British Columbia
