= Cirque Peak (British Columbia) =

Mountain summit in British Columbia, Canada

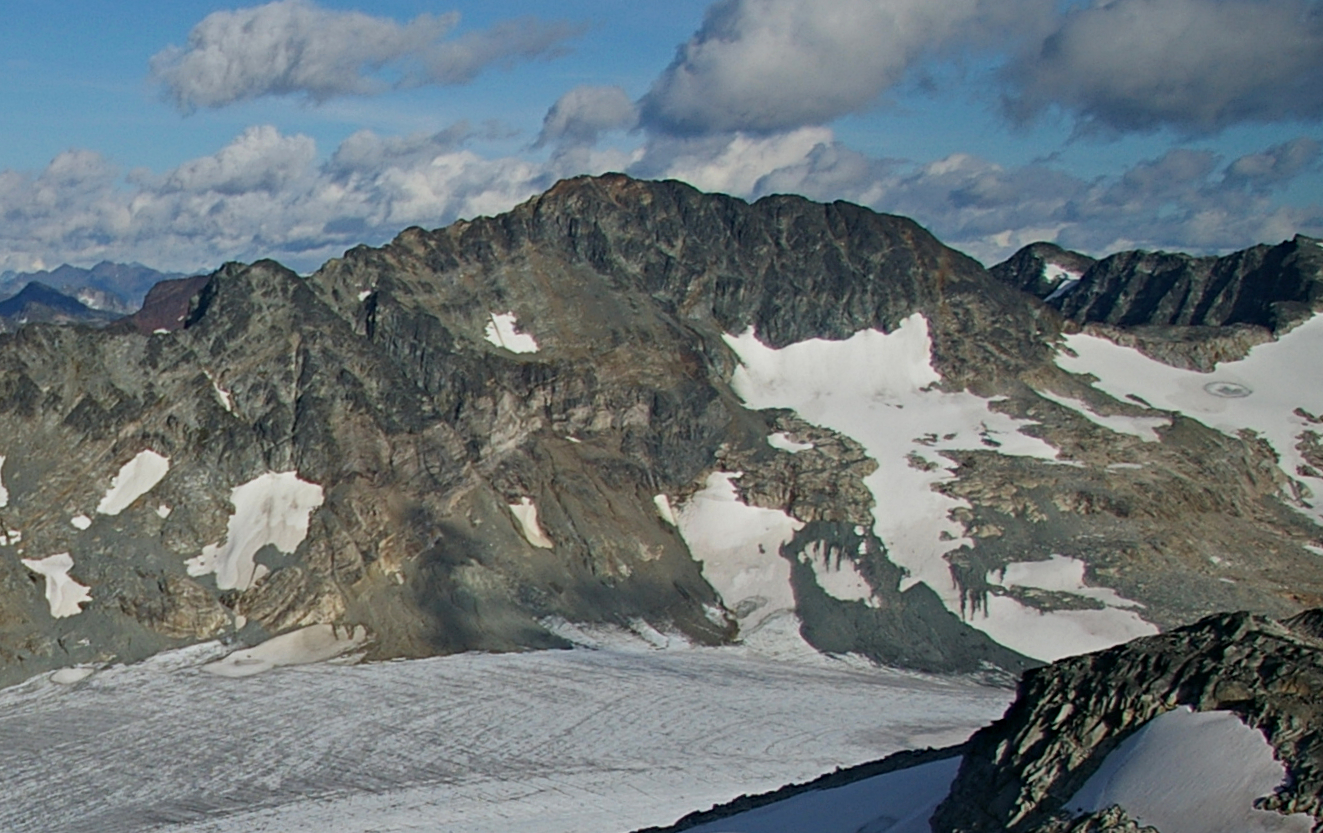
- Cirque Peak, western aspect

Highest point
- Elevation: 2,531 m (8,304 ft)
- Prominence: 476 m (1,562 ft)
- Parent peak: Mount Oleg (2587 m)
- Listing: Mountains of British Columbia
- Coordinates: 50°25′00″N 122°34′53″W

Geography
- Location within British Columbia Location within Canada
- Interactive map of Cirque Peak
- Country: Canada
- Province: British Columbia
- District: Lillooet Land District
- Parent range: Cayoosh Range; Lillooet Ranges; Coast Mountains
- Topo map: NTS 92J7 Pemberton

Climbing
- Easiest route: Scramble

Cirque Peak is a 2,531-metre (8,304-foot) mountain summit located in the Cayoosh Range of the Lillooet Ranges, in southwestern British Columbia, Canada. It is situated 19 km (12 mi) northeast of Pemberton, 4.4 km (3 mi) west-northwest of Cayoosh Mountain, 3.2 km (2 mi) east-southeast of Mount Gardiner, and immediately east of the Place Glacier. The mountain's cirque name, which describes the shape of the peak, was submitted by mountaineer Karl Ricker of the Alpine Club of Canada. The name was officially adopted on January 23, 1979, by the Geographical Names Board of Canada. Precipitation runoff from the peak drains into tributaries of the Fraser River.

== Climate ==
Based on the Köppen climate classification, Cirque Peak is located in a subarctic climate zone of western North America. Most weather fronts originate in the Pacific Ocean, and travel east toward the Coast Mountains where they are forced upward by the range (Orographic lift), causing them to drop their moisture in the form of rain or snowfall. As a result, the Coast Mountains experience high precipitation, especially during the winter months in the form of snowfall. Temperatures can drop below −20 °C (−4 °F) with wind chill factors below −30 °C (−22 °F). The months July through September offer the most favorable weather for climbing Cirque Peak.

== Climbing Routes ==
Established climbing routes on Cirque Peak:

- East Face Gully
- North Ridge via Place Glacier - class 3

== See also ==
- Geography of British Columbia
- Geology of British Columbia
