= Mount Chief Pascall =

Mountain in British Columbia, Canada

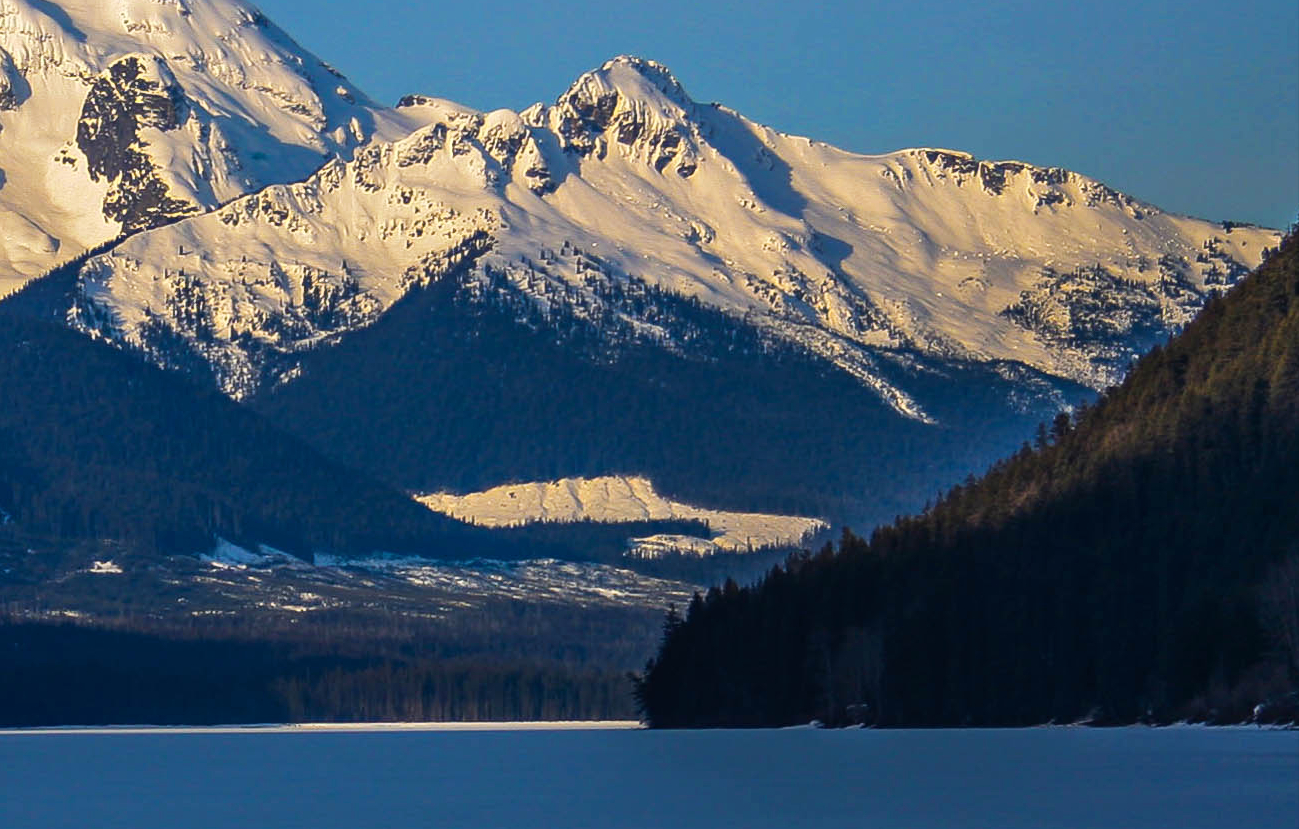
- Mount Chief Pascall seen from Duffy Lake

Highest point
- Elevation: 2,206 m (7,238 ft)
- Prominence: 296 m (971 ft)
- Parent peak: Joffre Peak (2721 m)
- Listing: Mountains of British Columbia
- Coordinates: 50°21′35″N 122°26′52″W

Geography
- Location within British Columbia Location within Canada
- Interactive map of Mount Chief Pascall
- Location: British Columbia, Canada
- District: Lillooet Land District
- Parent range: Joffre Group; Lillooet Ranges; Pacific Coast Ranges
- Topo map: NTS 92J8 Duffey Lake

Climbing
- Easiest route: Scramble, via Cerise Creek drainage

Mount Chief Pascall is a 2,206-metre (7,238-foot) mountain summit located in the Joffre Group of the Lillooet Ranges, in southwestern British Columbia, Canada. It is situated 26 km (16 mi) east of Pemberton, 8 km (5 mi) southwest of Duffy Lake, and within Nlháxten/Cerise Creek Conservancy. Cayoosh Pass lies immediately northwest of the mountain, with Cayoosh Mountain on the opposite side of the pass. Its nearest higher peak is Joffre Peak, 2.1 km (1 mi) to the south, and Mount Rohr rises 5 km (3 mi) to the northeast. Precipitation runoff from the peak drains into tributaries of Cayoosh Creek.

The mountain's name was submitted by Karl Ricker of the Alpine Club of Canada to honor Chief Bill Pascall, an early leader of the Lillooet Band. The toponym was officially adopted on January 23, 1979, by the Geographical Names Board of Canada.

== Climate ==
Based on the Köppen climate classification, Mount Chief Pascall is located in a subarctic climate zone of western North America. Most weather fronts originate in the Pacific Ocean, and travel east toward the Coast Mountains where they are forced upward by the range (Orographic lift), causing them to drop their moisture in the form of rain or snowfall. As a result, the Coast Mountains experience high precipitation, especially during the winter months in the form of snowfall. Winter temperatures can drop below −20 °C with wind chill factors below −30 °C. The months July through September offer the most favorable weather for climbing Mount Chief Pascall.

== Gallery ==
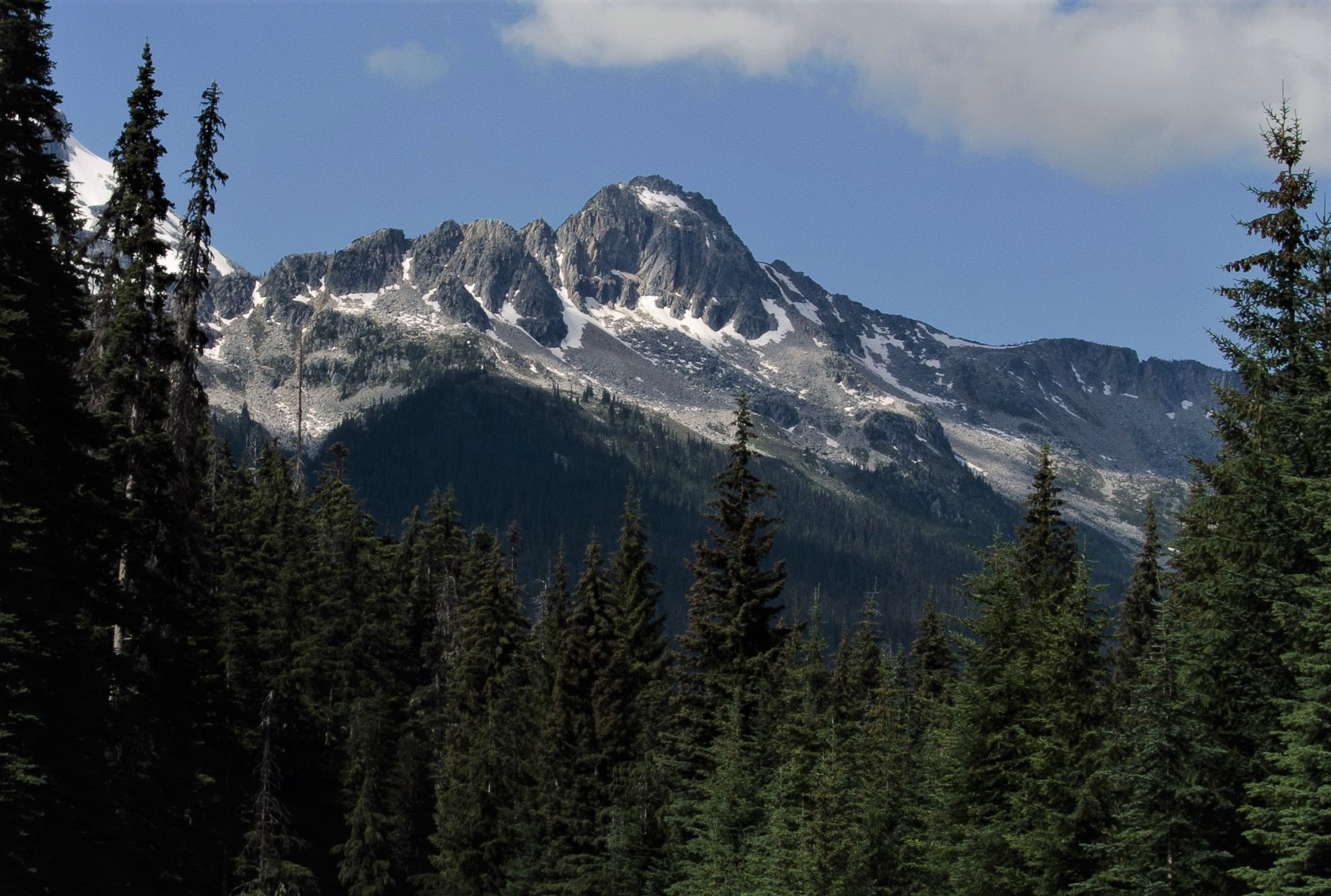
Mount Chief Pascall

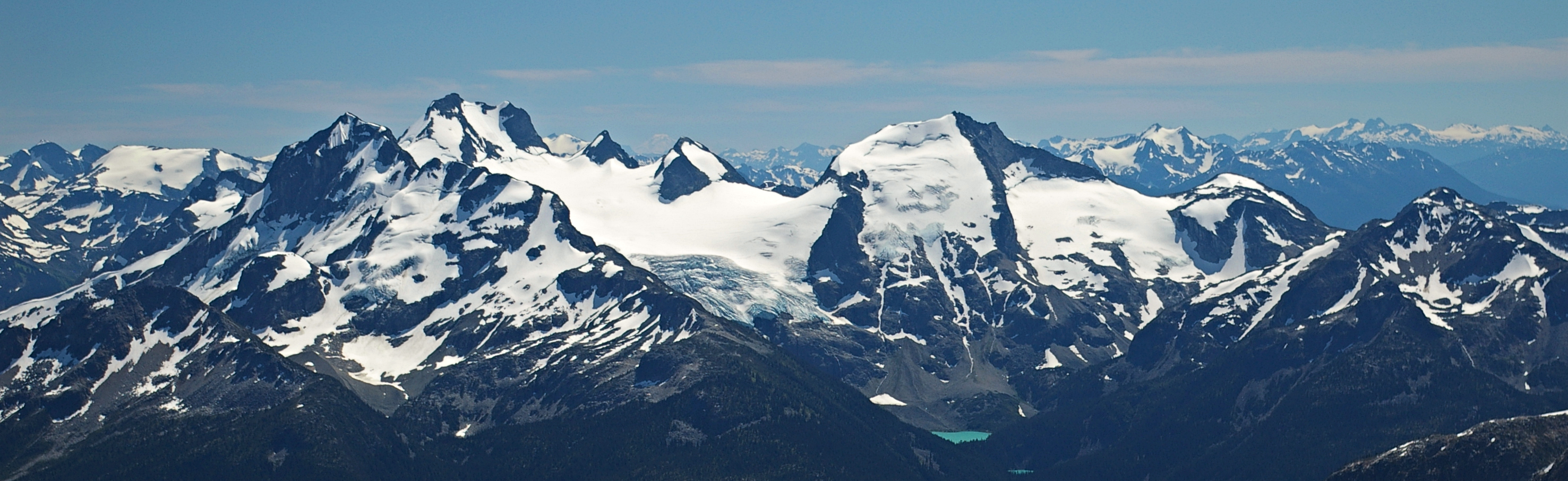
Joffre Group seen from Mount Marriott. Joffre Peak (left), Mt. Matier (highest), and Slalok Mountain (right). Mount Chief Pascall is located in lower left corner (see file annotations).

== See also ==
- Geography of British Columbia
- Geology of British Columbia
