= Mount Olds =

Mountain in British Columbia, Canada

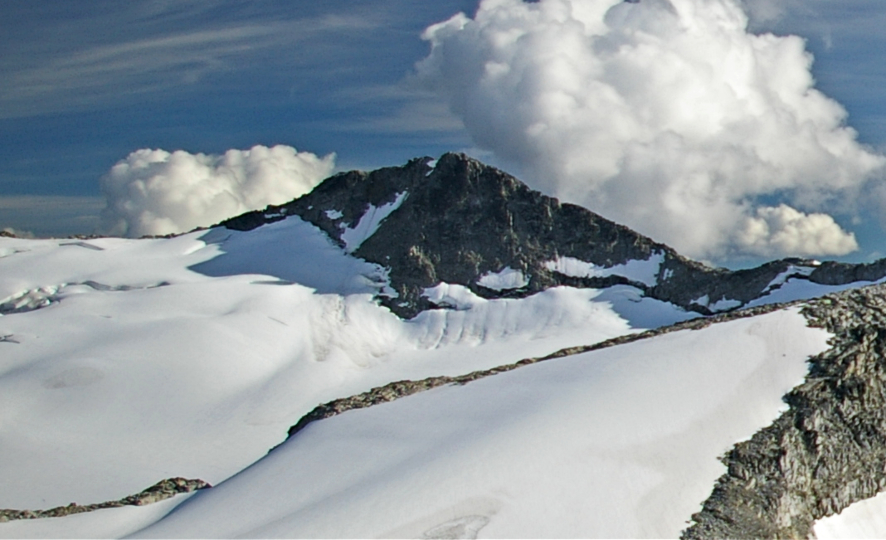
- Mount Olds, north aspect

Highest point
- Elevation: 2,542 m (8,340 ft)
- Prominence: 120 m (390 ft)
- Parent peak: Mount Oleg (2587 m)
- Listing: Mountains of British Columbia
- Coordinates: 50°24′32″N 122°36′50″W

Geography
- Location within British Columbia Location within Canada
- Interactive map of Mount Olds
- Location: British Columbia, Canada
- District: Lillooet Land District
- Parent range: Cayoosh Range; Lillooet Ranges; Coast Mountains
- Topo map: NTS 92J7 Pemberton

Climbing
- First ascent: 1962 by R. Gilbert
- Easiest route: Scramble

Mount Olds is a 2,542-metre (8,340-foot) mountain summit located in the Cayoosh Range of the Lillooet Ranges, in southwestern British Columbia, Canada. It is situated 17 km (11 mi) northeast of Pemberton, 2 km (1 mi) south-southeast of Mount Gardiner, and 1 km (1 mi) east of Mount Oleg, which is its nearest higher peak. The mountain's name was officially adopted on June 21, 1976, by the Geographical Names Board of Canada. Precipitation runoff from the peak drains into tributaries of the Fraser River.

== Climate ==
Based on the Köppen climate classification, Mount Olds is located in a subarctic climate zone of western North America. Most weather fronts originate in the Pacific Ocean, and travel east toward the Coast Mountains where they are forced upward by the range (Orographic lift), causing them to drop their moisture in the form of rain or snowfall. As a result, the Coast Mountains experience high precipitation, especially during the winter months in the form of snowfall. This climate supports the Place Glacier on the north slope of Mount Olds. Winter temperatures can drop below −20 °C with wind chill factors below −30 °C. The months July through September offer the most favorable weather for climbing Mount Olds.

== Gallery ==
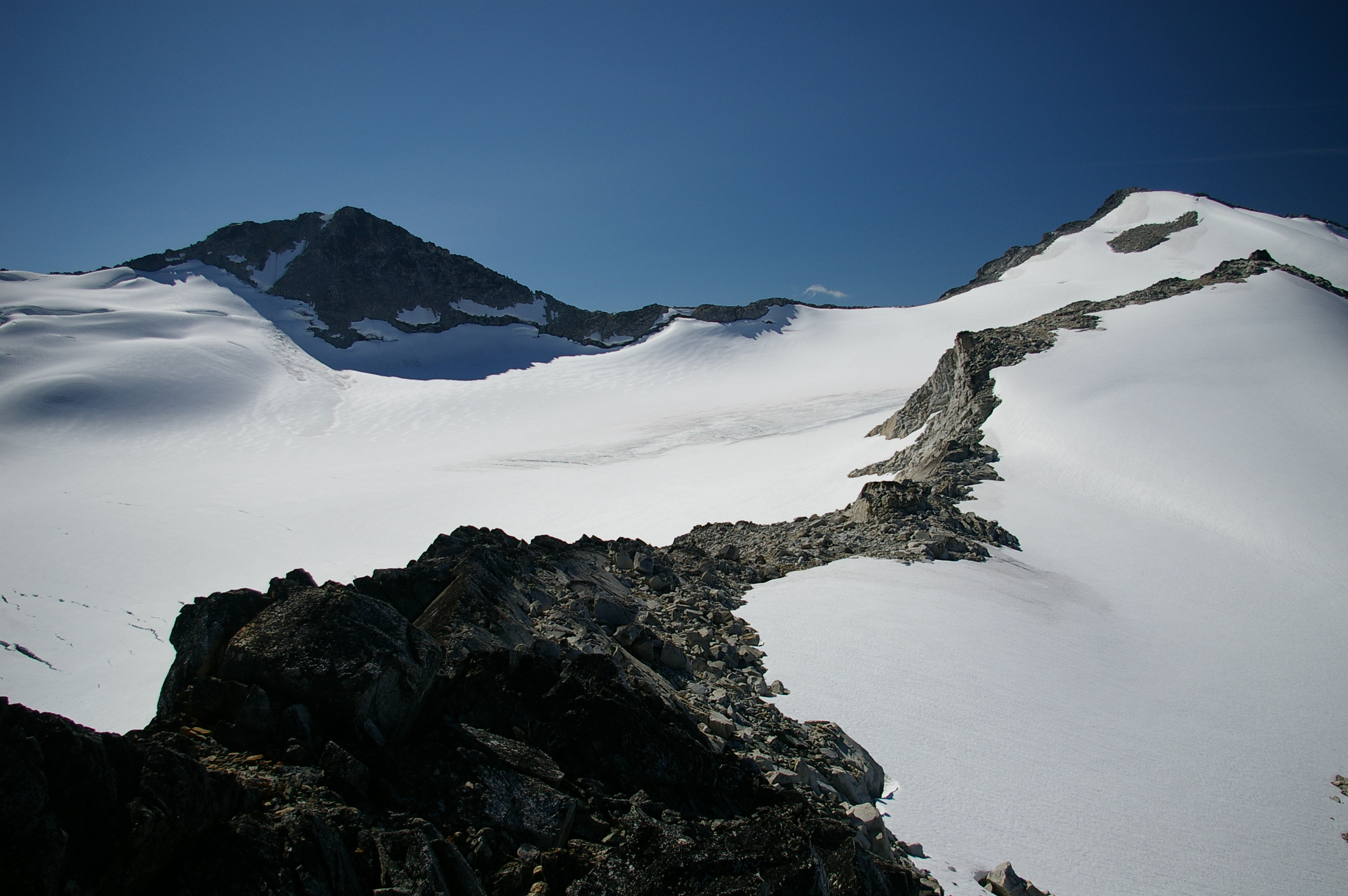
Mount Olds (left) and Mount Oleg (right)

== See also ==
- Geography of British Columbia
- Geology of British Columbia
