= Handcar Peak =

Mountain summit in British Columbia, Canada

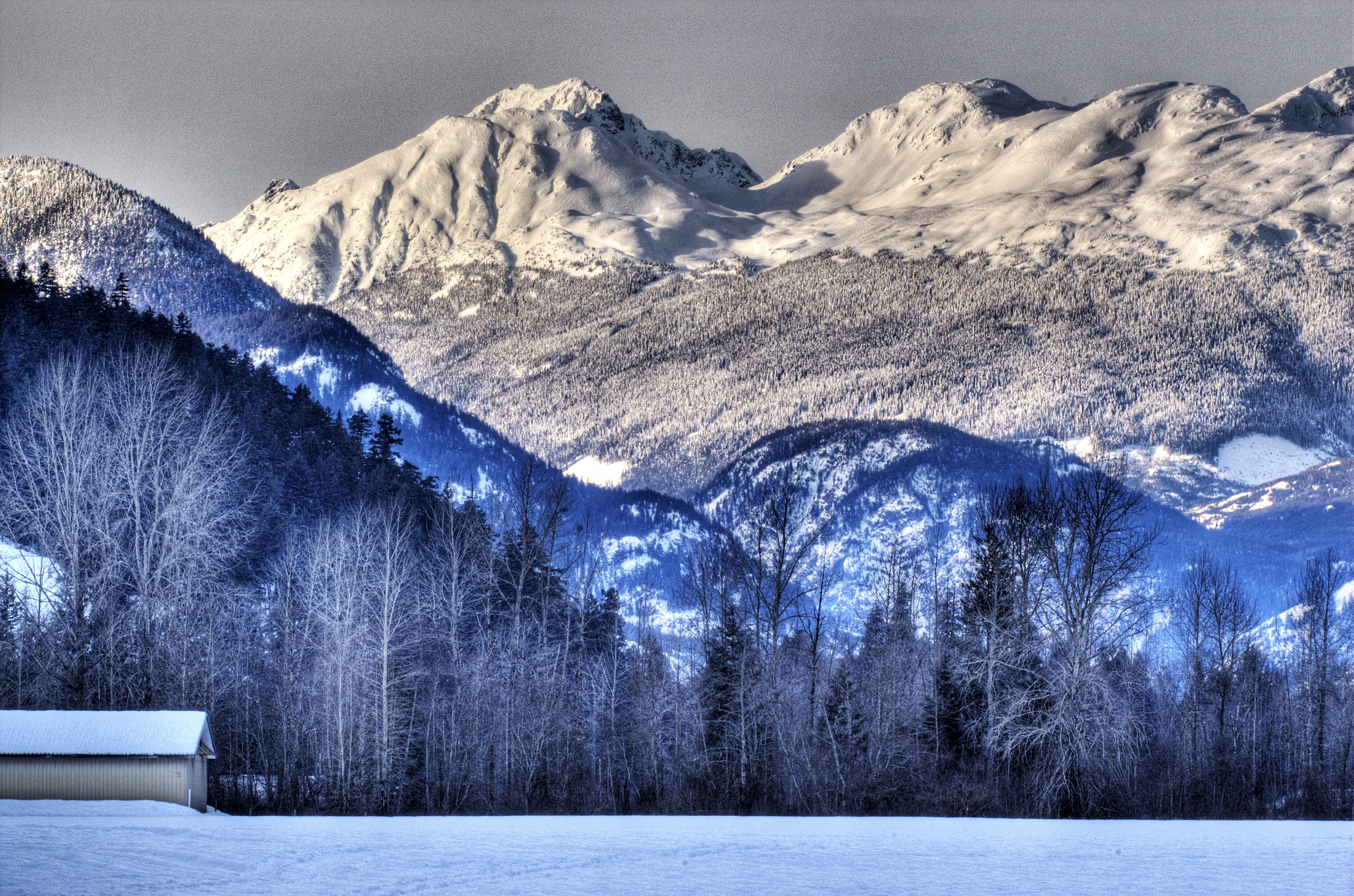
- Southeast aspect, upper left

Highest point
- Elevation: 2,338 m (7,671 ft)
- Prominence: 210 m (689 ft)
- Parent peak: Face Mountain (2,485 m)
- Isolation: 1.05 km (0.65 mi)
- Listing: Mountains of British Columbia
- Coordinates: 50°35′01″N 123°05′55″W

Naming
- Etymology: Handcar

Geography
- Location within British Columbia Location within Canada
- Interactive map of Handcar Peak
- Location: British Columbia, Canada
- District: Lillooet Land District
- Parent range: Thiassi Range; Coast Mountains
- Topo map: NTS 92J11 North Creek

Handcar Peak is a 2,338-metre (7,671-foot) mountain summit located in the Railroad Group of the Coast Mountains, in the Pemberton Valley of southwestern British Columbia, Canada. It is situated 38 km (24 mi) northwest of Pemberton and 3 km (2 mi) west of Locomotive Mountain. Precipitation runoff from the peak drains into Sampson Creek and Buck Creek which are both tributaries of the Lillooet River. Handcar Peak is more notable for its steep rise above local terrain than for its absolute elevation as topographic relief is significant with the summit rising over 2,050 meters (6,725 ft) above Lillooet River and Pemberton Valley in approximately 4 km (2.5 mi). The mountain's name was proposed in 1978 by mountaineer Karl Ricker of the Alpine Club of Canada, in association with Railroad Pass, Railroad Creek and other railroad-related names of the immediate vicinity. The toponym was officially adopted January 23, 1979, by the Geographical Names Board of Canada.

== Climate ==
Based on the Köppen climate classification, Handcar Peak is located in a subarctic climate zone of western North America. Most weather fronts originate in the Pacific Ocean, and travel east toward the Coast Mountains where they are forced upward by the range (Orographic lift), causing them to drop their moisture in the form of rain or snowfall. As a result, the Coast Mountains experience high precipitation, especially during the winter months in the form of snowfall. Winter temperatures can drop below −20 °C with wind chill factors below −30 °C. This climate supports the Siding Glacier on the peak's north slope. The months July through September offer the most favorable weather for climbing Handcar Peak.

== Gallery ==
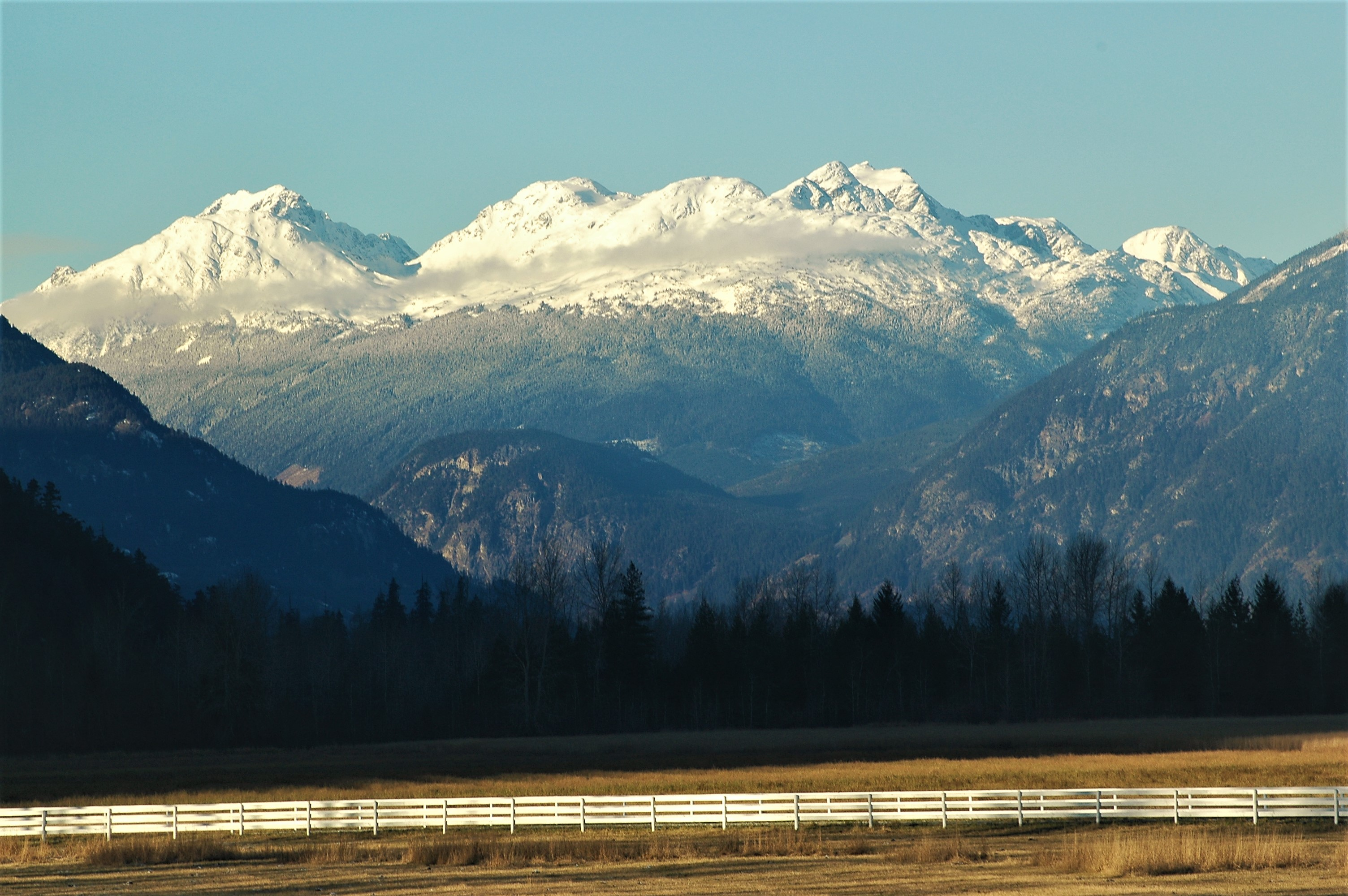
Handcar Peak (left) from southeast in Pemberton Valley
(Locomotive Mountain to the right)

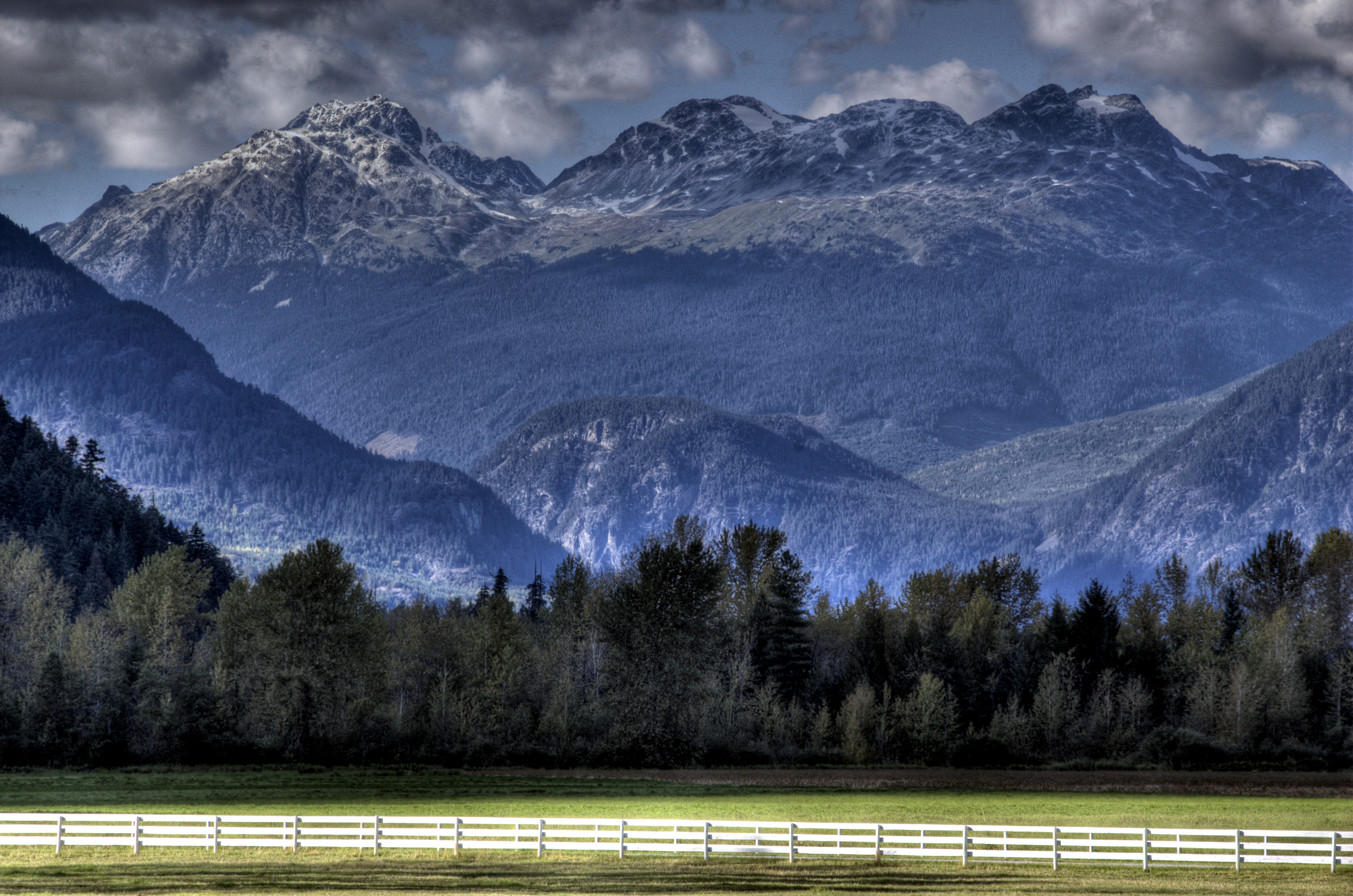
Handcar Peak (left) from southeast in Pemberton Valley
(Locomotive Mountain to the right)

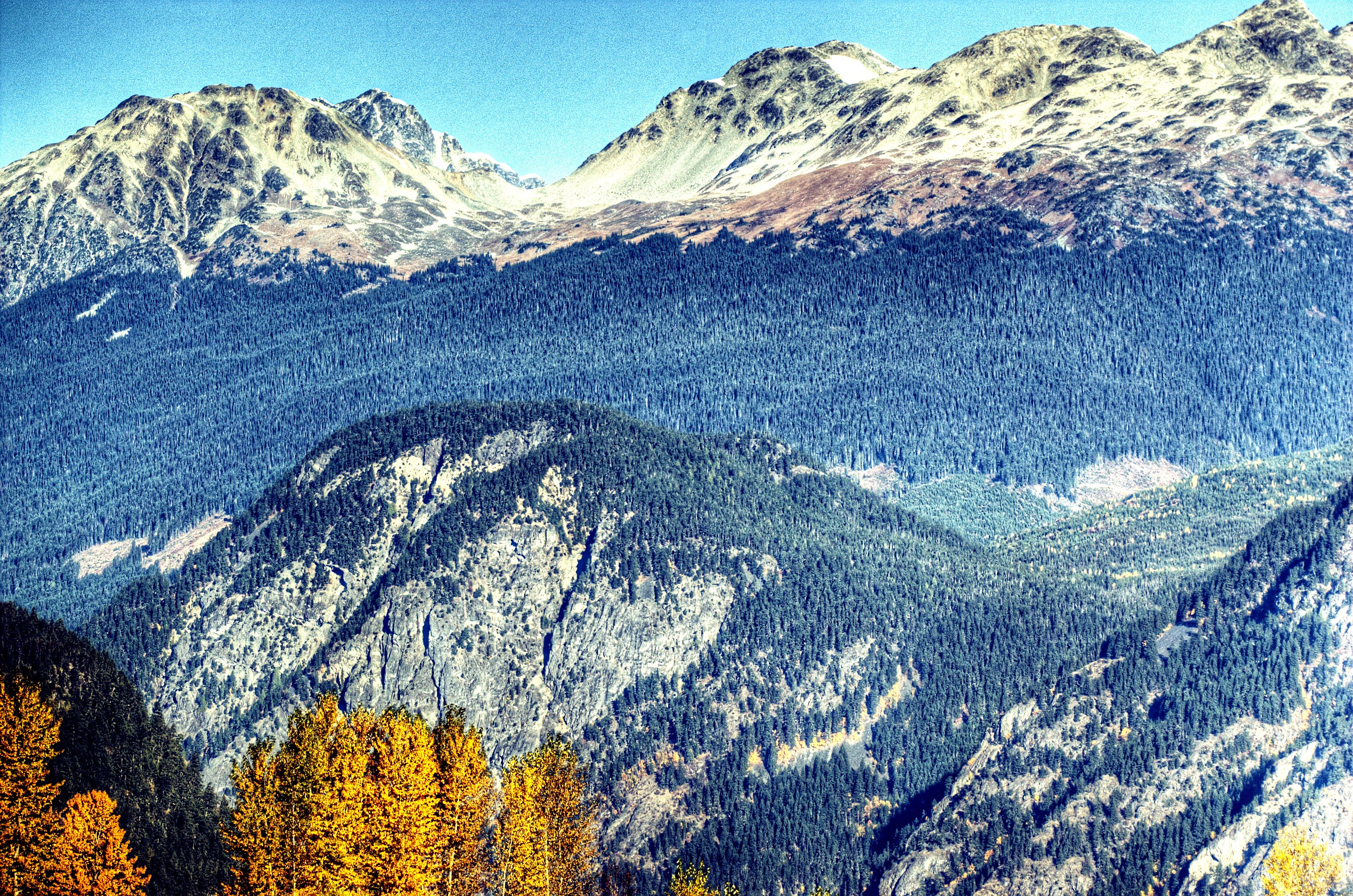
Handcar Peak (upper left)

== See also ==
- Geography of British Columbia
- Geology of British Columbia
