= Mount Oleg =

Mountain in British Columbia, Canada

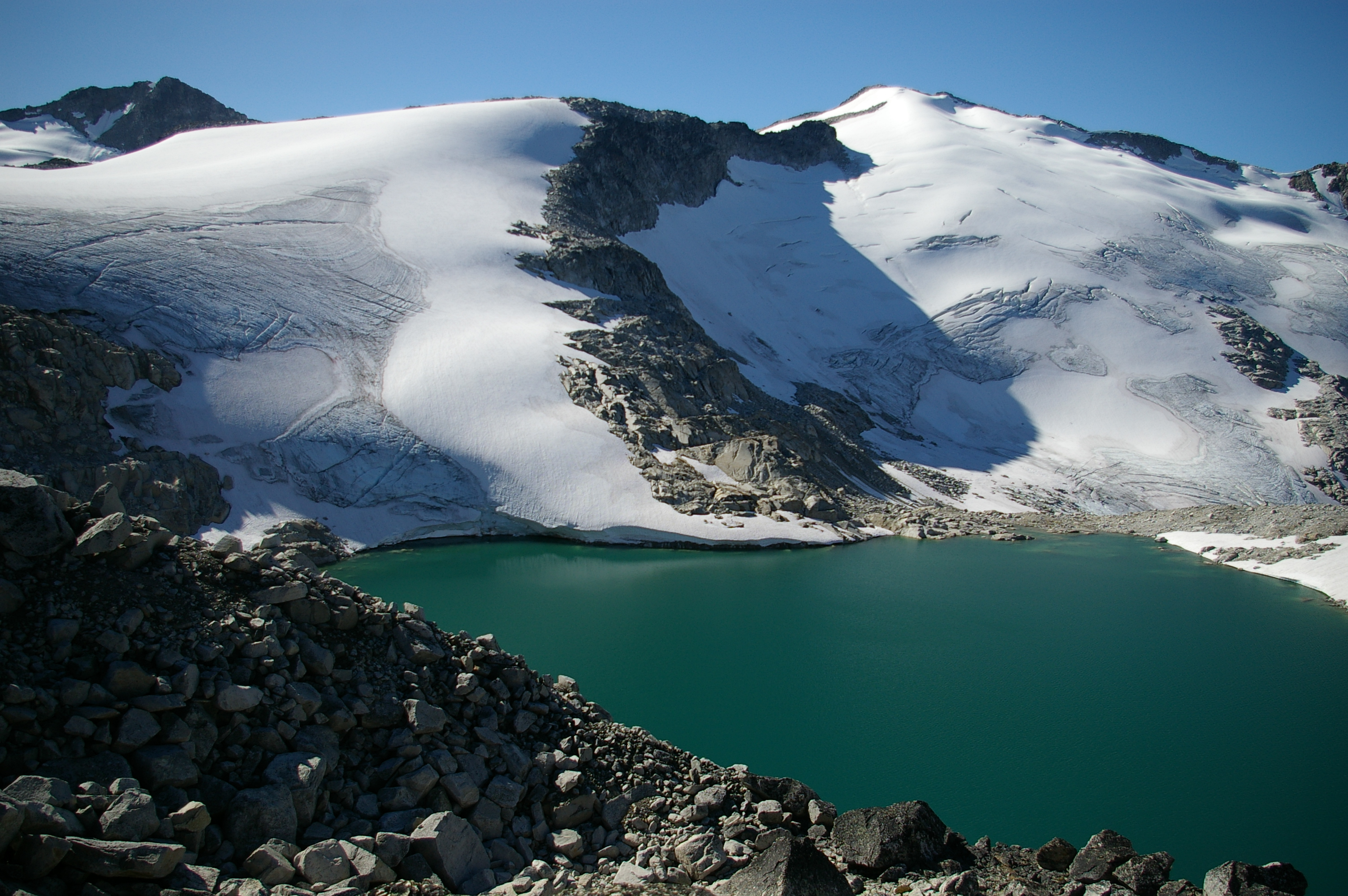
- Mount Oleg, north aspect

Highest point
- Elevation: 2,587 m (8,488 ft)
- Prominence: 717 m (2,352 ft)
- Parent peak: Mount Marriott (2735 m)
- Listing: Mountains of British Columbia
- Coordinates: 50°24′32″N 122°37′39″W

Geography
- Location within British Columbia Location within Canada
- Location: British Columbia, Canada
- Parent range: Cayoosh Range; Lillooet Ranges; Coast Mountains
- Topo map: NTS 92J7 Pemberton

Climbing
- Easiest route: Scrambling

Mount Oleg is a prominent 2,587-metre (8,488-foot) mountain summit located in the Cayoosh Range of the Lillooet Ranges, in southwestern British Columbia, Canada. It is situated 16 km (10 mi) northeast of Pemberton, 1.8 km (1 mi) south of Mount Gardiner, and 9.6 km (6 mi) southwest of Mount Marriott, which is its nearest higher peak. Precipitation runoff from the peak drains into tributaries of the Fraser River.

== Climate ==
Based on the Köppen climate classification, Mount Oleg is located in a subarctic climate zone of western North America. Most weather fronts originate in the Pacific Ocean, and travel east toward the Coast Mountains where they are forced upward by the range (Orographic lift), causing them to drop their moisture in the form of rain or snowfall. As a result, the Coast Mountains experience high precipitation, especially during the winter months in the form of snowfall. This climate supports the Place Glacier on the north slopes of Mount Oleg. Winter temperatures can drop below −20 °C with wind chill factors below −30 °C. The months July through September offer the most favorable weather for climbing Mount Oleg.

== Gallery ==
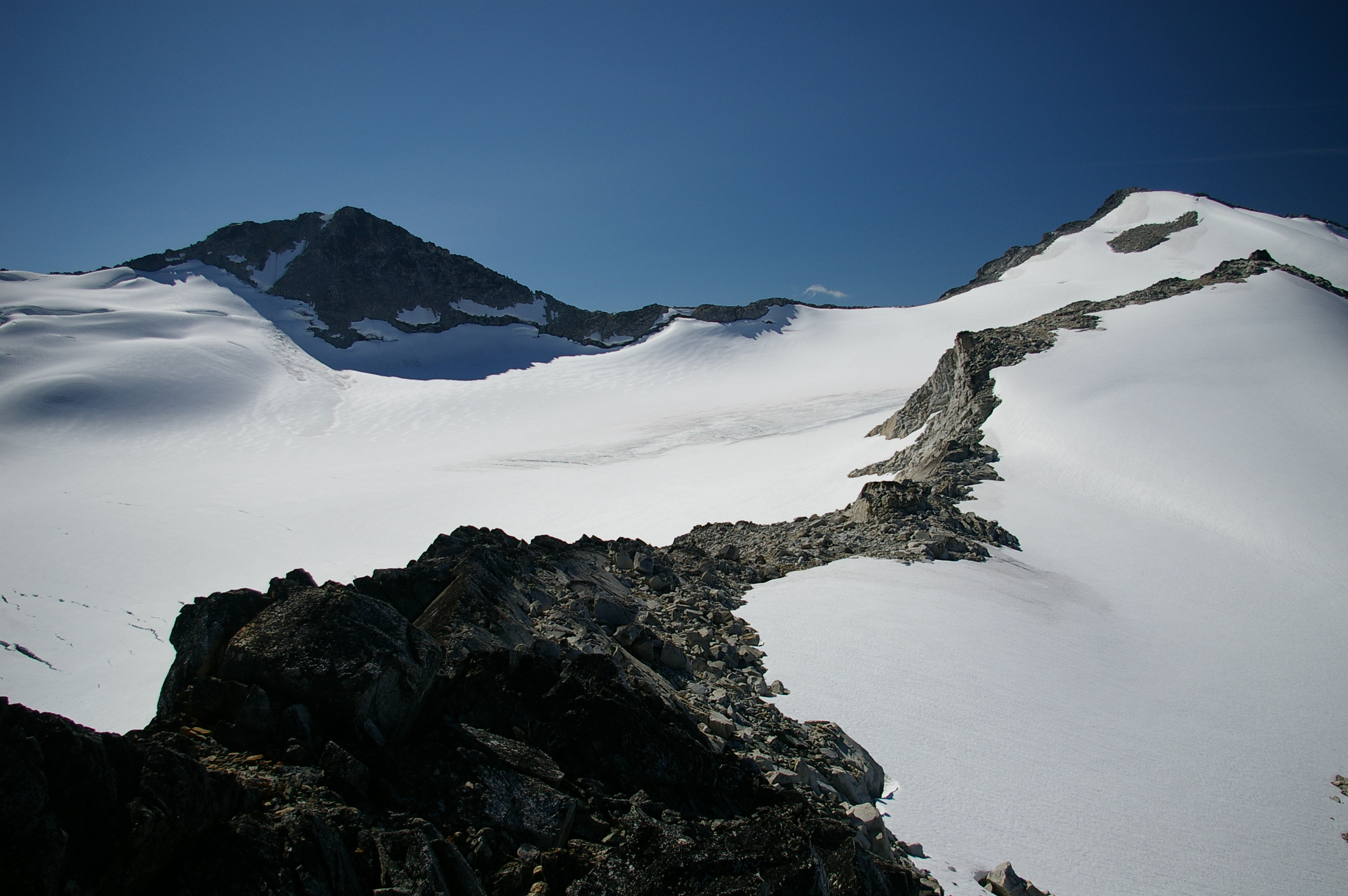
Mount Olds (left) and Mount Oleg (right)

== See also ==
- Geography of British Columbia
- Geology of British Columbia
