= Railroad Pass (British Columbia) =

Mountain pass in British Columbia, Canada

- Location within British Columbia
- Elevation: 1,385 m (4,544 ft)

Third Approach
- Location: British Columbia, Canada
- Range: Pacific Ranges
- Coordinates: 50°35′50.892″N 123°01′8.6628″W
- Topo map: NTS 92J11 North Creek

Railroad Pass, 1,385 m (4,544 ft), usually known locally as Railway Pass, is a mountain pass in the Pacific Ranges of the Coast Mountains in southwestern British Columbia, Canada. Traversed by a seasonal dirt road known as the Hurley Main and sometimes also referred to therefore as Hurley Pass, the pass connects the Pemberton Meadows area of the upper valley of the Lillooet River, via Railroad Creek, to the uppermost reaches of the Hurley River, the main south fork of the Bridge River which the Hurley joins at the settlement of Gold Bridge.

Railroad Pass gets its name from its potential as a possible route for a railway through the Coast Mountains although no formal record of such a survey exists. The Canadian Pacific Survey went through this area, but records only exist of survey parties attempting Ring Pass, at the head of the Lillooet River, and the divide between Meager Creek and Toba Inlet, as well as the southerly route since used by the Pacific Great Eastern, now a part of the Canadian National Railway conglomerate.

Railroad Pass was investigated in the 1980s as a possible extension route for BC Highway 99 as a "back door" for the Whistler resort in case of geotechnical emergencies that would isolate the resort (a more southerly route used by Cayoosh Pass was chosen).

A group of peaks on the north side of the pass is called the Railroad Group and includes summit-names like Locomotive Mountain, Tender, Caboose, and Handcar Peak.
