= Locomotive Mountain =

Mountain in British Columbia, Canada

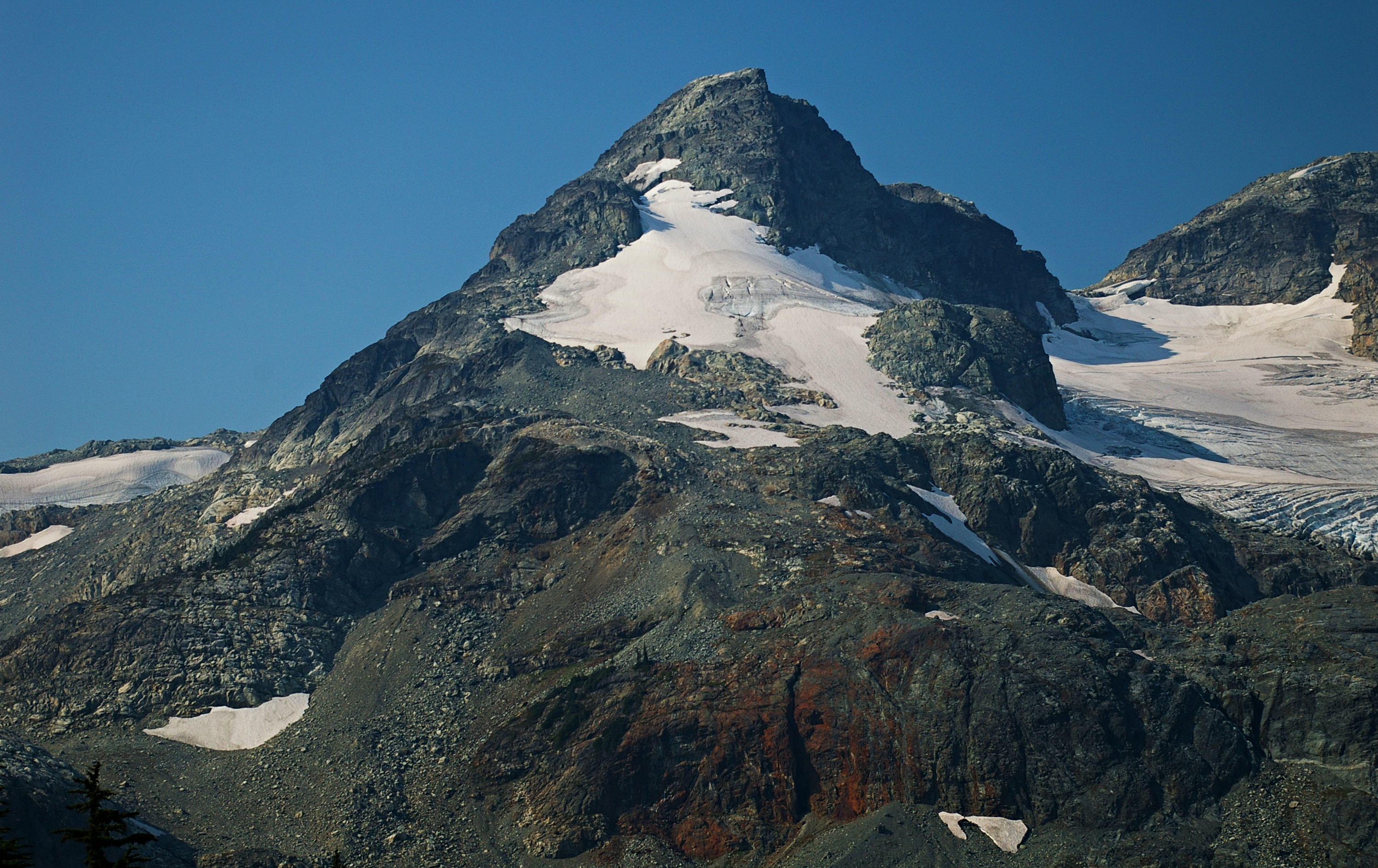
- Locomotive Mountain, northeast aspect

Highest point
- Elevation: 2,340 m (7,680 ft)
- Prominence: 130 m (430 ft)
- Parent peak: Face Mountain (2485 m)
- Listing: Mountains of British Columbia
- Coordinates: 50°34′58″N 123°03′31″W

Geography
- Location within British Columbia Location within Canada
- Interactive map of Locomotive Mountain
- Location: British Columbia, Canada
- District: Lillooet Land District
- Parent range: Thiassi Range; Coast Mountains
- Topo map: NTS 92J11 North Creek

Climbing
- First ascent: 1972 by Fred Thiessen, Eric White, Peter Jordan
- Easiest route: Scrambling via South Ridge

Locomotive Mountain is a 2,340-metre (7,680-foot) mountain summit located in the Railroad Group of the Coast Mountains, in the Pemberton Valley of southwestern British Columbia, Canada. It is situated 35 km (22 mi) northwest of Pemberton, 3 km (2 mi) east of Handcar Peak, and 2.1 km (1 mi) south of Face Mountain, which is the nearest higher neighbor. Precipitation runoff from the peak drains into tributaries of the Fraser River. The mountain's name was proposed in 1978 by mountaineer Karl Ricker of the Alpine Club of Canada, in association with Railroad Pass, Railroad Creek, and other railroad-related names of the immediate vicinity. The toponym was officially adopted January 23, 1979, by the Geographical Names Board of Canada.

== Climate ==
Based on the Köppen climate classification, Locomotive Mountain is located in a subarctic climate zone of western North America. Most weather fronts originate in the Pacific Ocean, and travel east toward the Coast Mountains where they are forced upward by the range (Orographic lift), causing them to drop their moisture in the form of rain or snowfall. As a result, the Coast Mountains experience high precipitation, especially during the winter months in the form of snowfall. Winter temperatures can drop below −20 °C with wind chill factors below −30 °C. The mountain and its climate supports Train Glacier on its northern slopes. The months July through September offer the most favorable weather for climbing Locomotive Mountain.

== Gallery ==
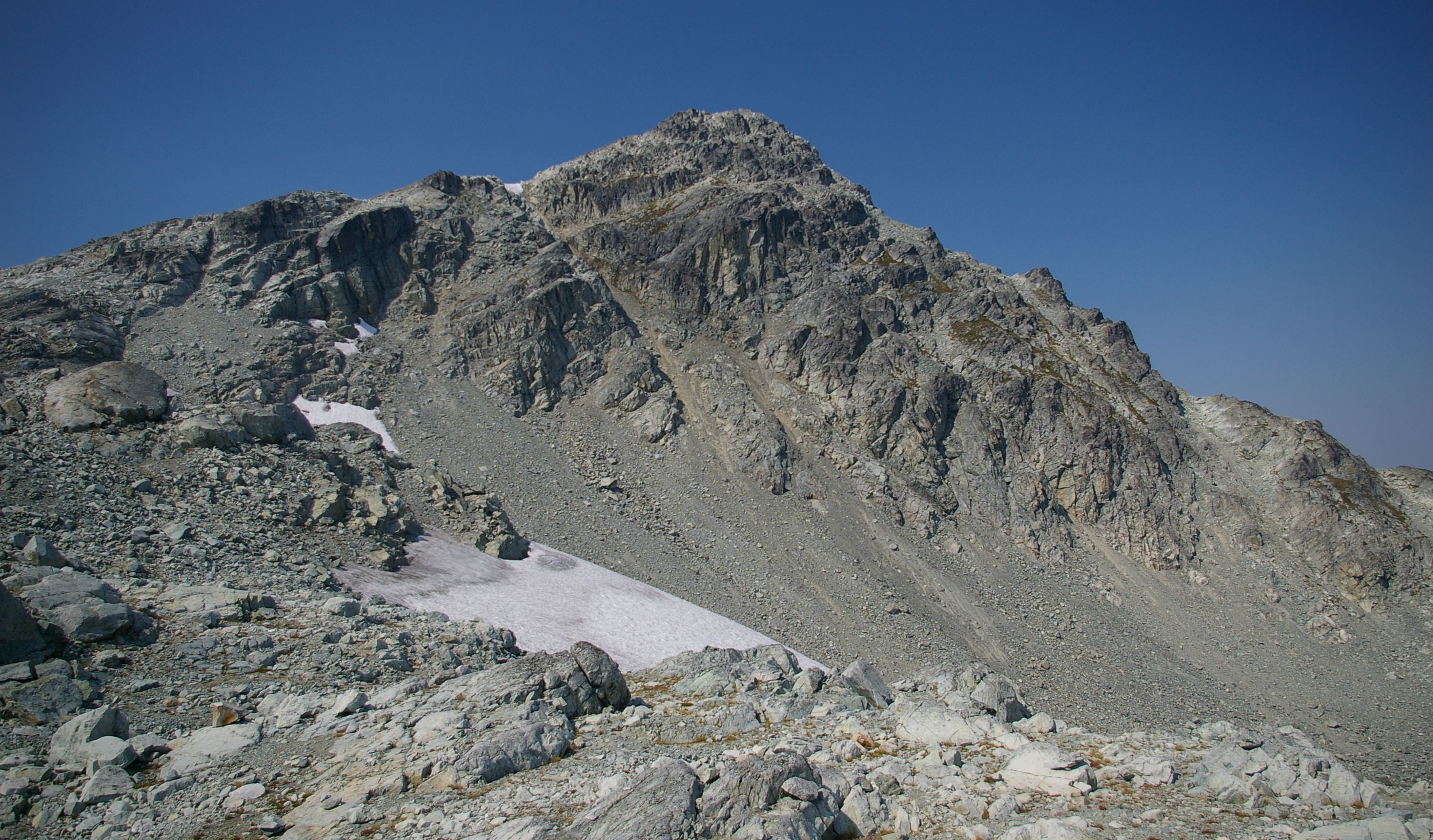
Locomotive Mountain from south

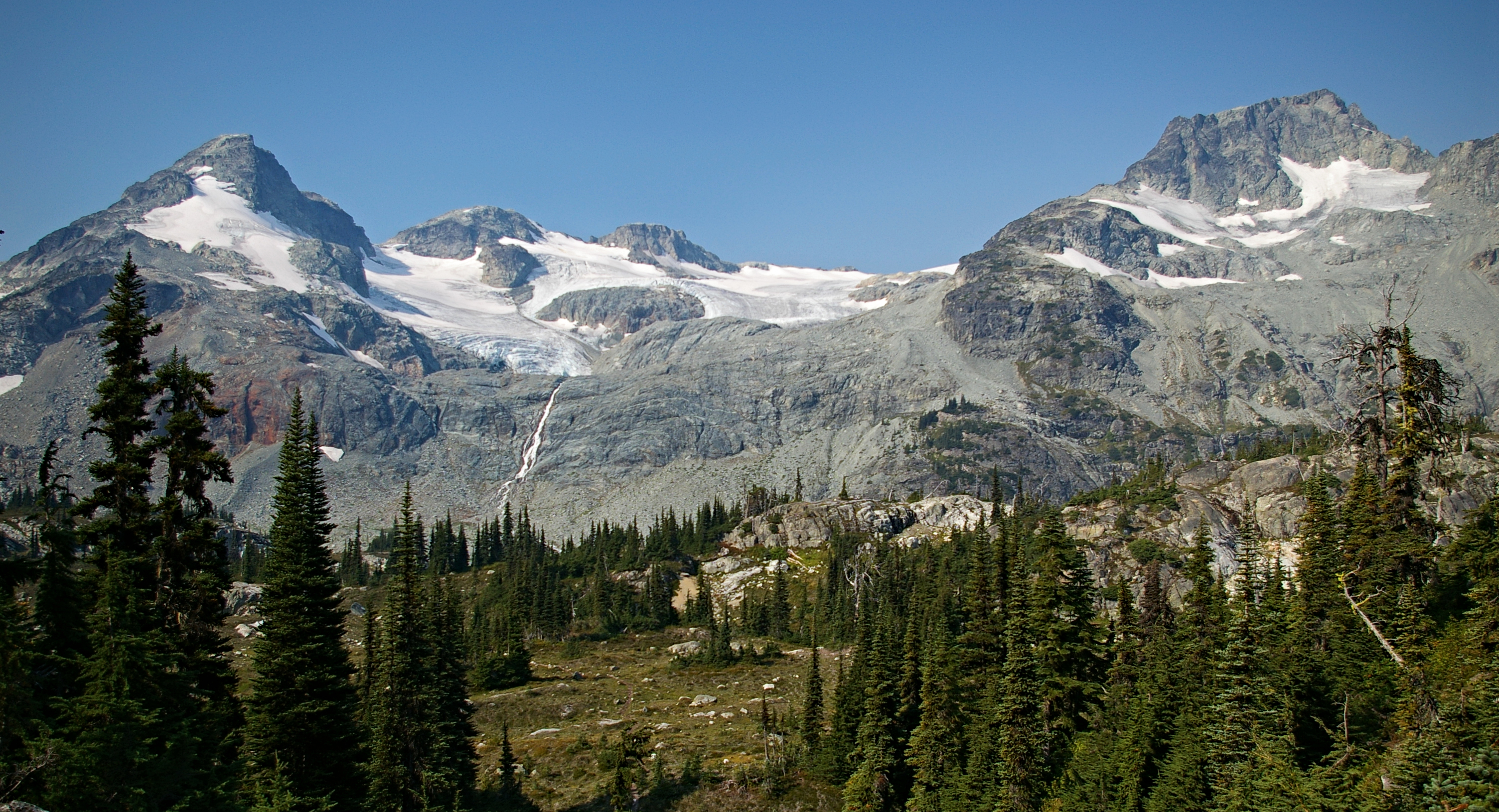
Locomotive, Tender, Caboose above Train Glacier. Face Mountain (right)

== See also ==
- Geography of British Columbia
- Geology of British Columbia
