= Mount Duke =

Mountain in British Columbia, Canada

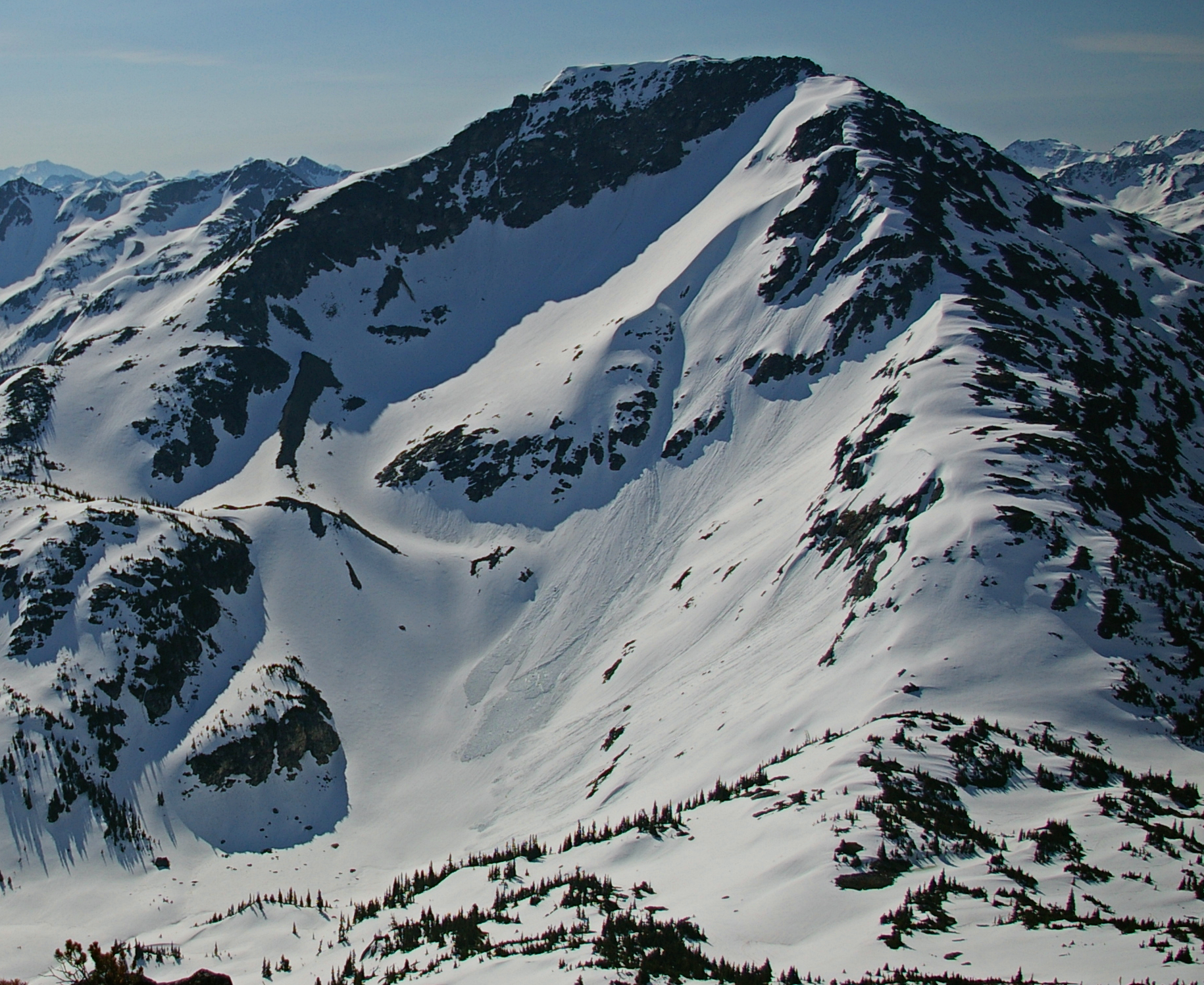
- Mt. Duke, northwest aspect, from Vantage Peak

Highest point
- Elevation: 2,379 m (7,805 ft)
- Prominence: 389 m (1,276 ft)
- Listing: Mountains of British Columbia
- Coordinates: 50°19′07″N 122°22′59″W

Geography
- Location within British Columbia Location within Canada
- Interactive map of Mount Duke
- Location: British Columbia, Canada
- District: Lillooet Land District
- Parent range: Joffre Group; Lillooet Ranges; Coast Mountains
- Topo map: NTS 92J8 Duffey Lake

Climbing
- First ascent: 1966 by M. Juri, T. Anderson
- Easiest route: Scramble via northwest ridge

Mount Duke is a 2,379-metre (7,805-foot) mountain summit located in the Joffre Group of the Lillooet Ranges, in southwestern British Columbia, Canada. It is situated 30 km (19 mi) east of Pemberton, and 10 km (6 mi) southwest of Duffy Lake. The highest peak in the Joffre Group, Mount Matier, rises 4.4 km (3 mi) to the west. The mountain's name was submitted by Reverend Damasus Payne, a Benedictine monk and mountaineer, to honor Archbishop William Mark Duke. It was officially adopted on April 21, 1966, by the Geographical Names Board of Canada. Precipitation runoff from the peak drains into Caspar Creek and Twin One Creek.

== Climate ==
Based on the Köppen climate classification, Mount Duke is located in a subarctic climate zone of western North America. Most weather fronts originate in the Pacific Ocean, and travel east toward the Coast Mountains where they are forced upward by the range (Orographic lift), causing them to drop their moisture in the form of rain or snowfall. As a result, the Coast Mountains experience high precipitation, especially during the winter months in the form of snowfall. Temperatures can drop below −20 °C with wind chill factors below −30 °C. The months July through September offer the most favorable weather for climbing Mount Duke.

== See also ==
- Geography of British Columbia
- Geology of British Columbia
