= Face Mountain (British Columbia) =

Mountain summit in British Columbia, Canada

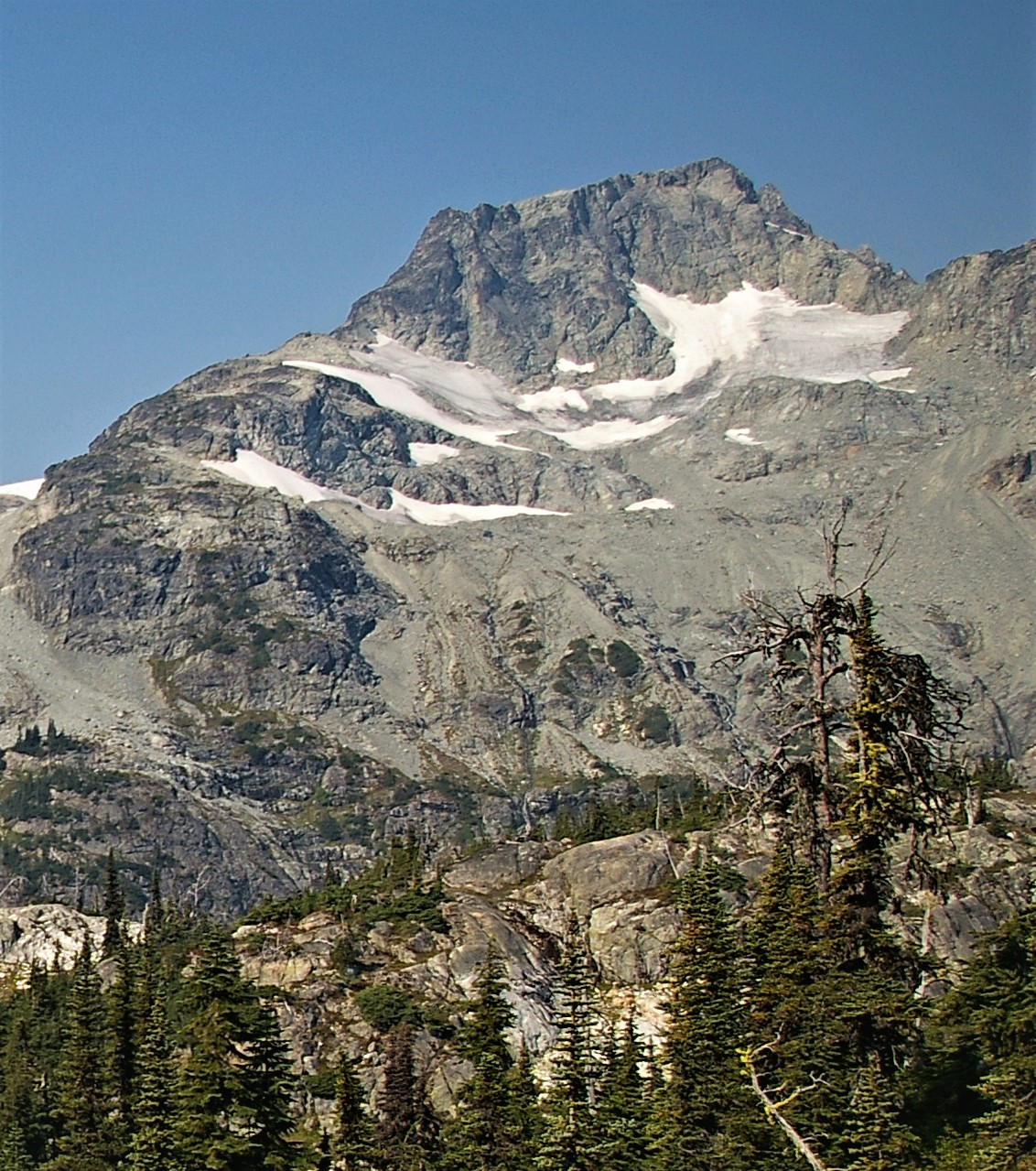
- East aspect

Highest point
- Elevation: 2,485 m (8,153 ft)
- Prominence: 747 m (2,451 ft)
- Parent peak: Mount Sampson (2,811 m)
- Isolation: 4.71 km (2.93 mi)
- Listing: Mountains of British Columbia
- Coordinates: 50°35′57″N 123°04′21″W

Geography
- Location within British Columbia Location within Canada
- Interactive map of Face Mountain
- Country: Canada
- Province: British Columbia
- District: Lillooet Land District
- Parent range: Thiassi Range; Coast Mountains
- Topo map: NTS 92J11 North Creek

Face Mountain is a 2,485-metre (8,153-foot) mountain summit located in British Columbia, Canada.

== Description ==
Face Mountain is set in the Thiassi Range of the Coast Mountains. It is situated 2.1 km (1 mi) northwest of Locomotive Mountain, 38 km (24 mi) northwest of the community of Pemberton, along the north side of Pemberton Valley. Precipitation runoff and glacial meltwater from the peak drains into Freight Creek and Donelly Creek which are both tributaries of the Hurley River. Face Mountain is more notable for its steep rise above local terrain than for its absolute elevation as topographic relief is significant with the summit rising 1,085 meters (3,560 ft) above Donelly Creek in approximately 2 km (1.2 mi). The mountain's toponym was officially adopted January 23, 1979, by the Geographical Names Board of Canada as identified in Canadian Alpine Journal (1936), and in Dick Culbert's "Alpine Guide to Southwestern British Columbia" (1974).

== Climate ==
Based on the Köppen climate classification, Face Mountain is located in a subarctic climate zone of western North America. Most weather fronts originate in the Pacific Ocean, and travel east toward the Coast Mountains where they are forced upward by the range (Orographic lift), causing them to drop their moisture in the form of rain or snowfall. As a result, the Coast Mountains experience high precipitation, especially during the winter months in the form of snowfall. Winter temperatures can drop below −20 °C with wind chill factors below −30 °C. This climate supports the Freight Glacier on the peak's west slope and the Train Glacier on the south slope. The months July through September offer the most favorable weather for climbing Face Mountain.

== See also ==
- Geography of British Columbia
- Geology of British Columbia
