= Cayoosh Range =

Mountain range in British Columbia, Canada

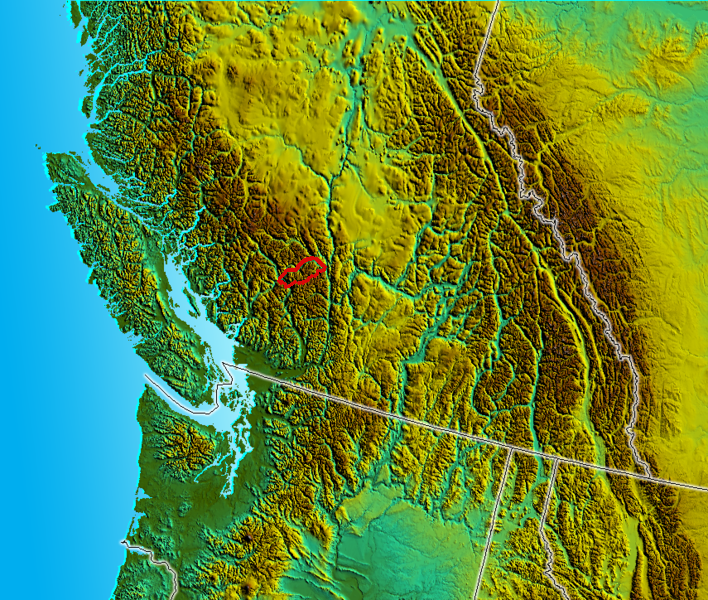
- Location map of Cayoosh Range

Highest point
- Peak: Goat Mountain
- Elevation: 2,855 m (9,367 ft)
- Coordinates: 50°37′25″N 122°15′37″W

Dimensions
- Length: 60 km (37 mi) SW-NE
- Width: 20 km (12 mi) NW-SE
- Area: 1,009 km^{2} (390 mi^{2})

Geography
- Country: Canada
- Province: British Columbia
- Parent range: Lillooet Ranges, Pacific Ranges, and Coast Mountains
- Borders on: Bendor Range; Birkenhead Ranges

The Cayoosh Range is the northernmost section of the Lillooet Ranges, which are a subrange of the Pacific Ranges of the Coast Mountains in British Columbia, Canada. The range covers an area of c. 1,000 km^{2} (390 sq mi) and is approximately 65 km (40 mi) SW to NE and about 20 km (12 mi) SE to NW.

In some classification systems the Lillooet Ranges are considered to form their own group, rather than being a subdivision of the Pacific Ranges, although the Bendor Range, north of the Cayoosh Range across Anderson Lake, is classified as part of the Pacific Ranges which would tend to imply that the Cayoosh and Lillooet Ranges are as well.

The Cayoosh Range is defined by the valley of Cayoosh Creek on the south, which is followed by the Duffey Lake Road section of Highway 99, from Pemberton-Mount Currie to Lillooet, which are at the respective western and eastern ends of the range. Cayoosh Pass, between the head of Duffey Lake and the descent to the Pemberton Valley at Lillooet Lake, was first traversed by a non-native by Sapper James Duffey of the Royal Engineers in 1860, who investigated (then dismissed it) as a possible overland alternative to the Douglas Road. The north flank of the range is the valley of Seton and Anderson Lakes and the Gates River's divide via Pemberton Pass with the lower valley of the Birkenhead River, which is the far western perimeter of the range.

Named peaks in the range are confined the western end of the range, but the higher summits, mostly officially unnamed but well known to climbers and hikers, are in the eastern part of the range. The western part of the range is coastal-alpine in character, with small glaciers and heavy snowfall. The eastern, higher part of the range verges on the semi-arid climate typical of the Fraser Canyon and the rest of the Interior and has no permanent snowfields or ice, and is known for its beautiful alpine meadows and stunning vistas of the surrounding ranges to the north, south and east.

The highest summit is Goat Mountain, a largely unseen peak with an elevation of 2,855 m (9,367 ft) between the head of Seton Lake and the head of Downton Creek, which is a tributary of Cayoosh Creek. It is the third-highest summit in the Lillooet Ranges after Skihist Mountain and Petlushkwohap Mountain, which are in the Cantilever Range west of Lytton.

The second-highest peak in the Cayoosh Range is Mount Marriott at 2,735 m (8,973 ft), due south of D'Arcy (N'quatqua); it is not named for the hotel-empire family of the same name but for an RCAF officer who was killed in action in World War II. Other summits include Cayoosh Mountain at 2,561 m (8,402 ft), Cirque Peak at 2,531 m (8,304 ft), Mount Gardiner at 2,406 m (7,894 ft), Mount Oleg at 2,587 m (8,488 ft), Saxifrage Mountain at 2,501 m (8,205 ft), and Mount Rohr at 2,423 m (7,949 ft).
