= Vantage Peak =

Mountain in the country of Canada

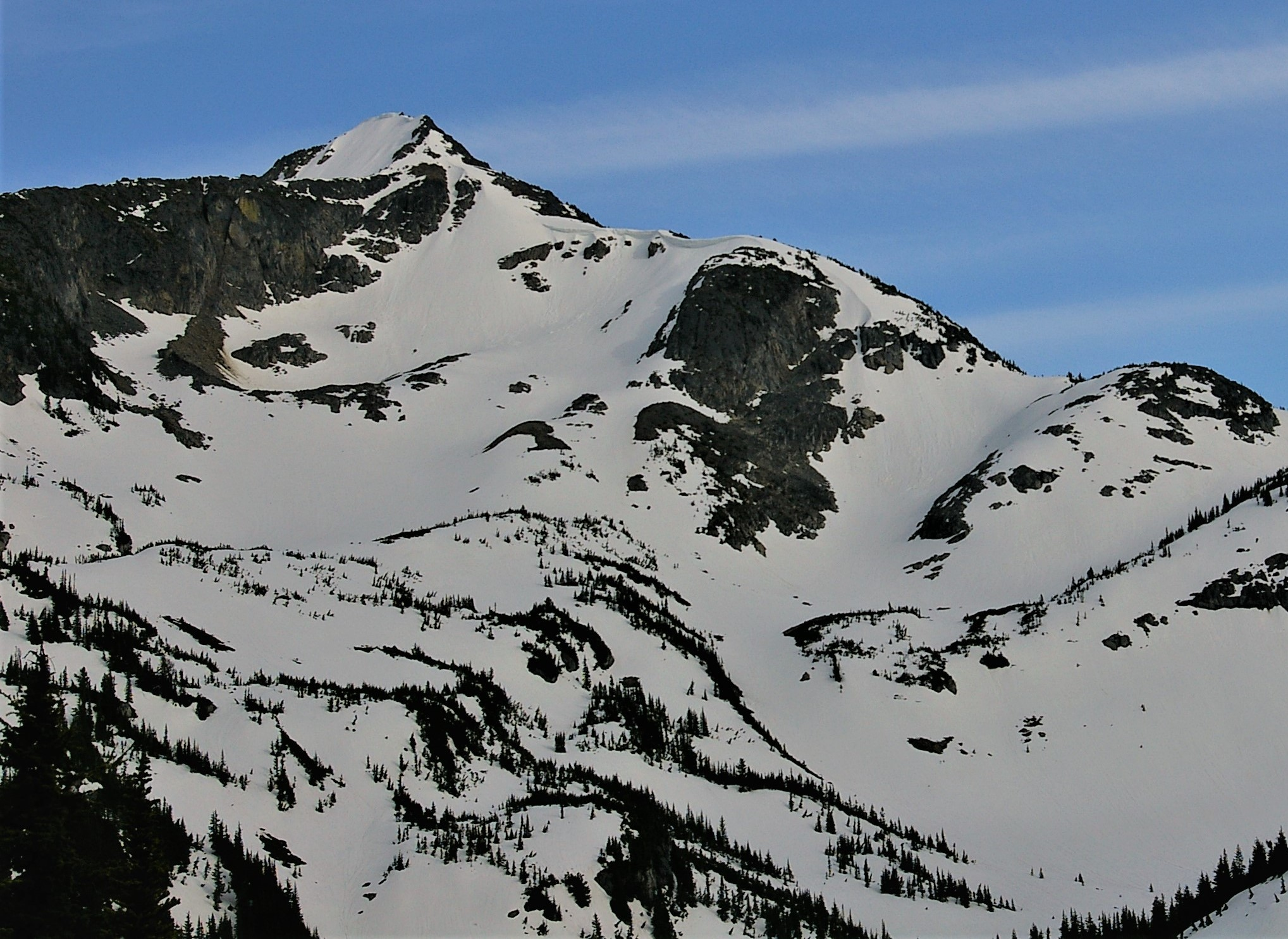
- North aspect

Highest point
- Elevation: 2,235 m (7,333 ft)
- Prominence: 395 m (1,296 ft)
- Parent peak: Mount Caspar (2,402 m)
- Isolation: 2.08 km (1.29 mi)
- Listing: Mountains of British Columbia
- Coordinates: 50°19′56″N 122°24′11″W

Geography
- Location within British Columbia Location within Canada
- Interactive map of Vantage Peak
- Country: Canada
- Province: British Columbia
- Protected area: Nlháxten/Cerise Creek Conservancy
- Parent range: Joffre Group; Lillooet Ranges; Coast Mountains
- Topo map: NTS 92J8 Duffey Lake

Climbing
- First ascent: 1957
- Easiest route: Scrambling

Vantage Peak is a 2,235-metre (7,333-foot) mountain summit located in the Coast Mountains of British Columbia, Canada. It is part of the Joffre Group, which is a subset of the Lillooet Ranges. It is situated 28.5 km (18 mi) east of Pemberton on the boundary of the Nlháxten/Cerise Creek Conservancy. Precipitation runoff from the peak drains southwest into Twin One Creek thence Lillooet Lake; the north slope drains into headwaters of Cerise Creek; and the east slope drains into Caspar Creek thence Cayoosh Creek which is within the Fraser River watershed. Vantage Peak is more notable for its steep rise above local terrain than for its absolute elevation as topographic relief is significant with the summit rising 1,135 meters (3,724 ft) above Twin One Creek in 4 km (2.5 mi). The nearest higher neighbor is Mount Duke, 2.08 km (1 mi) to the southeast.

== History ==
The mountain was named by the 1957 first ascent party, and the mountain's toponym was officially adopted June 22, 1967, by the Geographical Names Board of Canada.

== Climate ==
Based on the Köppen climate classification, Vantage Peak is located in a subarctic climate zone of western North America. Most weather fronts originate in the Pacific Ocean, and travel east toward the Coast Mountains where they are forced upward by the range (Orographic lift), causing them to drop their moisture in the form of rain or snowfall. As a result, the Coast Mountains experience high precipitation, especially during the winter months in the form of snowfall. Winter temperatures can drop below −20 °C with wind chill factors below −30 °C. The months July through September offer the most favorable weather for climbing Vantage Peak.

== Gallery ==
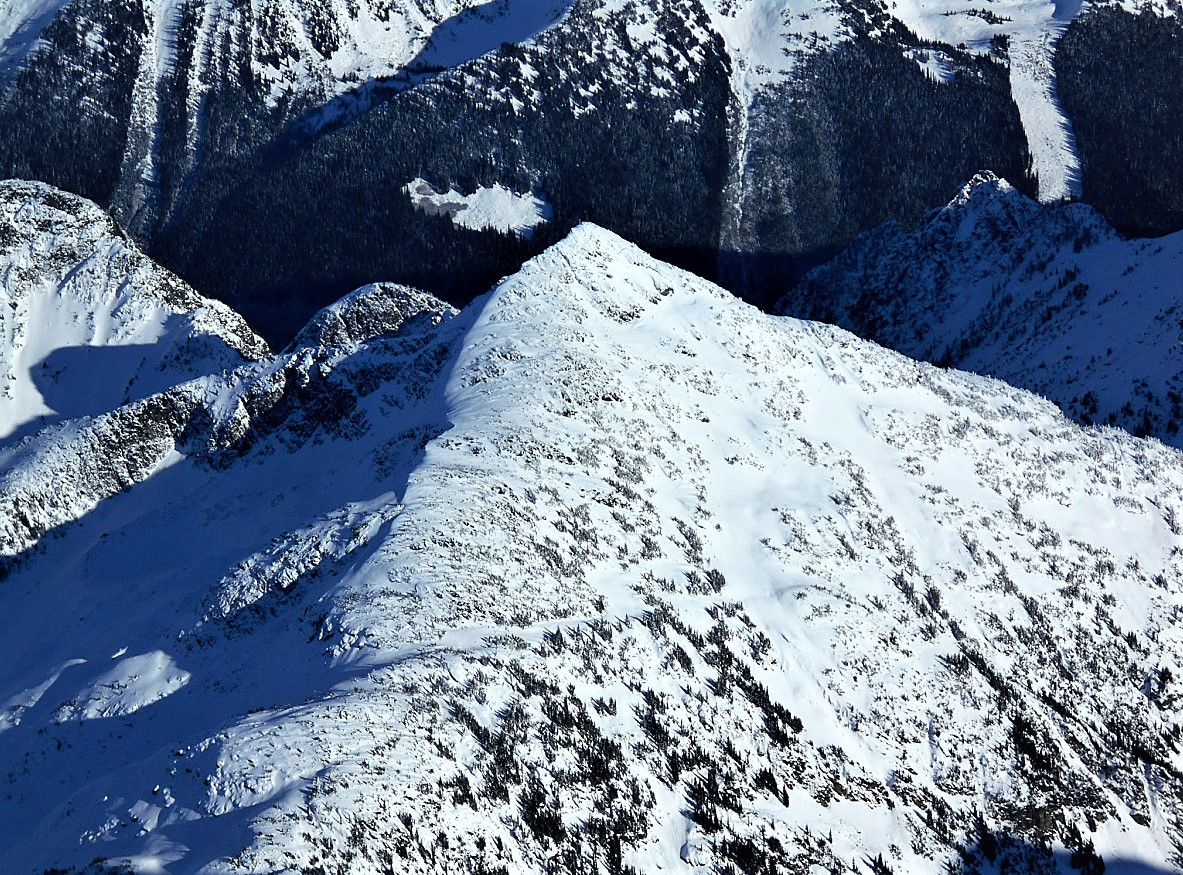
Vantage Peak viewed from summit of Mt. Matier.

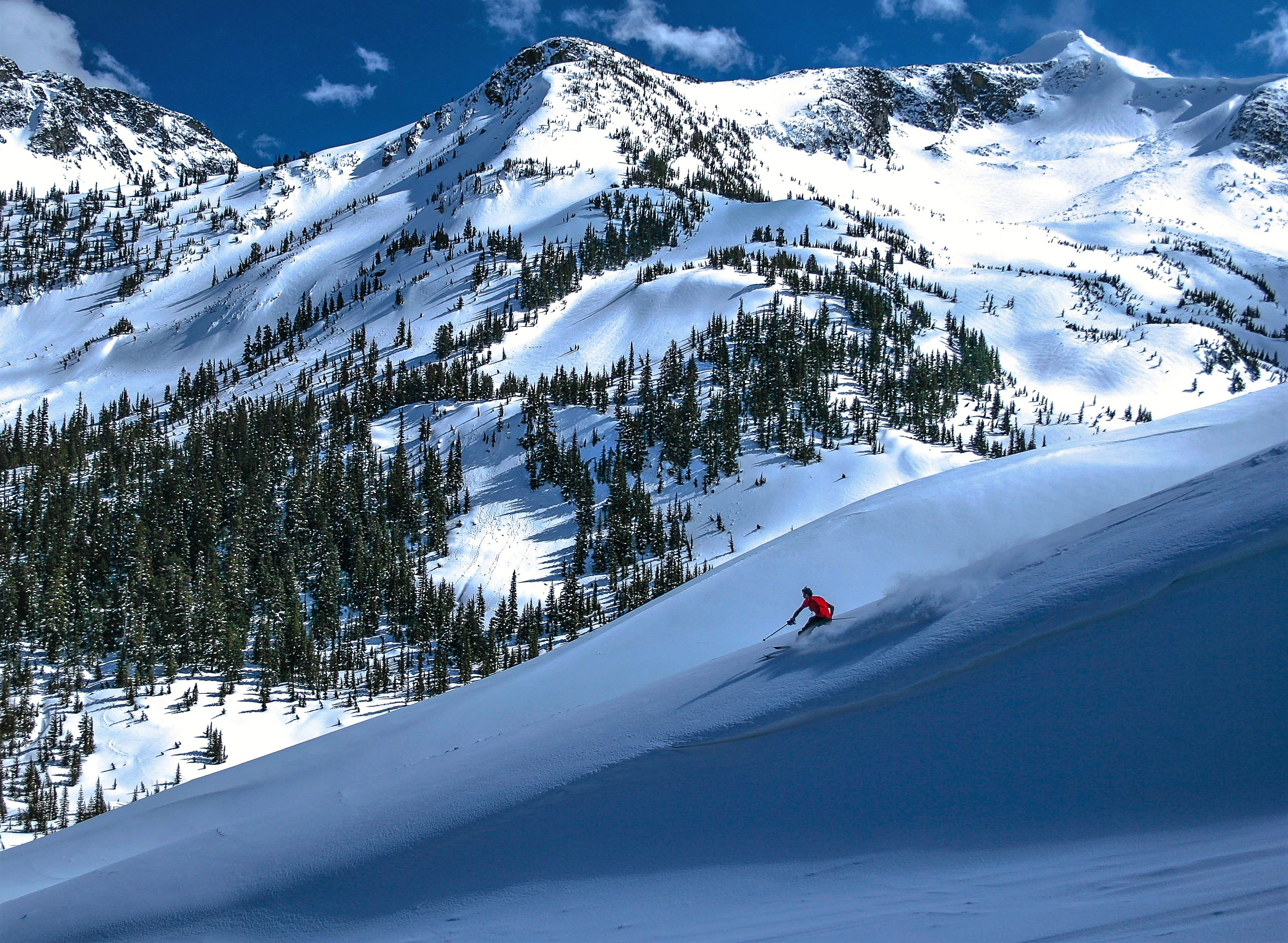
Summit of Vantage Peak upper right.

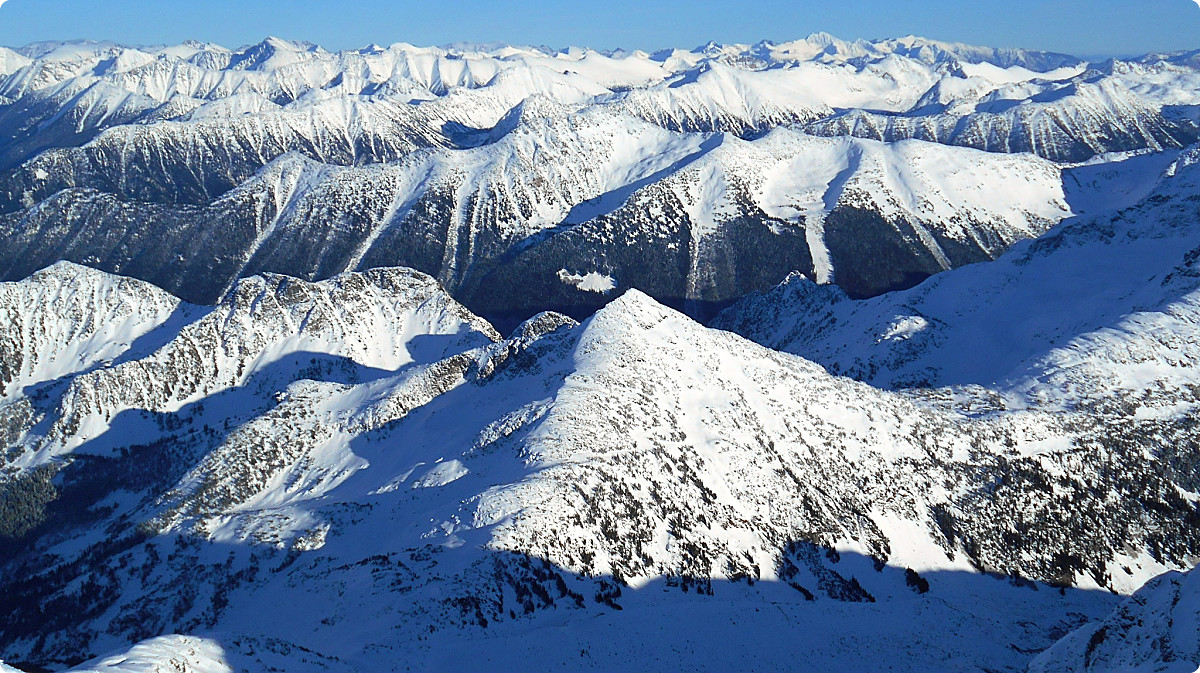
Vantage Peak centered down in front as seen from Mount Matier.

== See also ==
- Geography of British Columbia
- Geology of British Columbia
