= Cayoosh Mountain =

Mountain summit in British Columbia, Canada

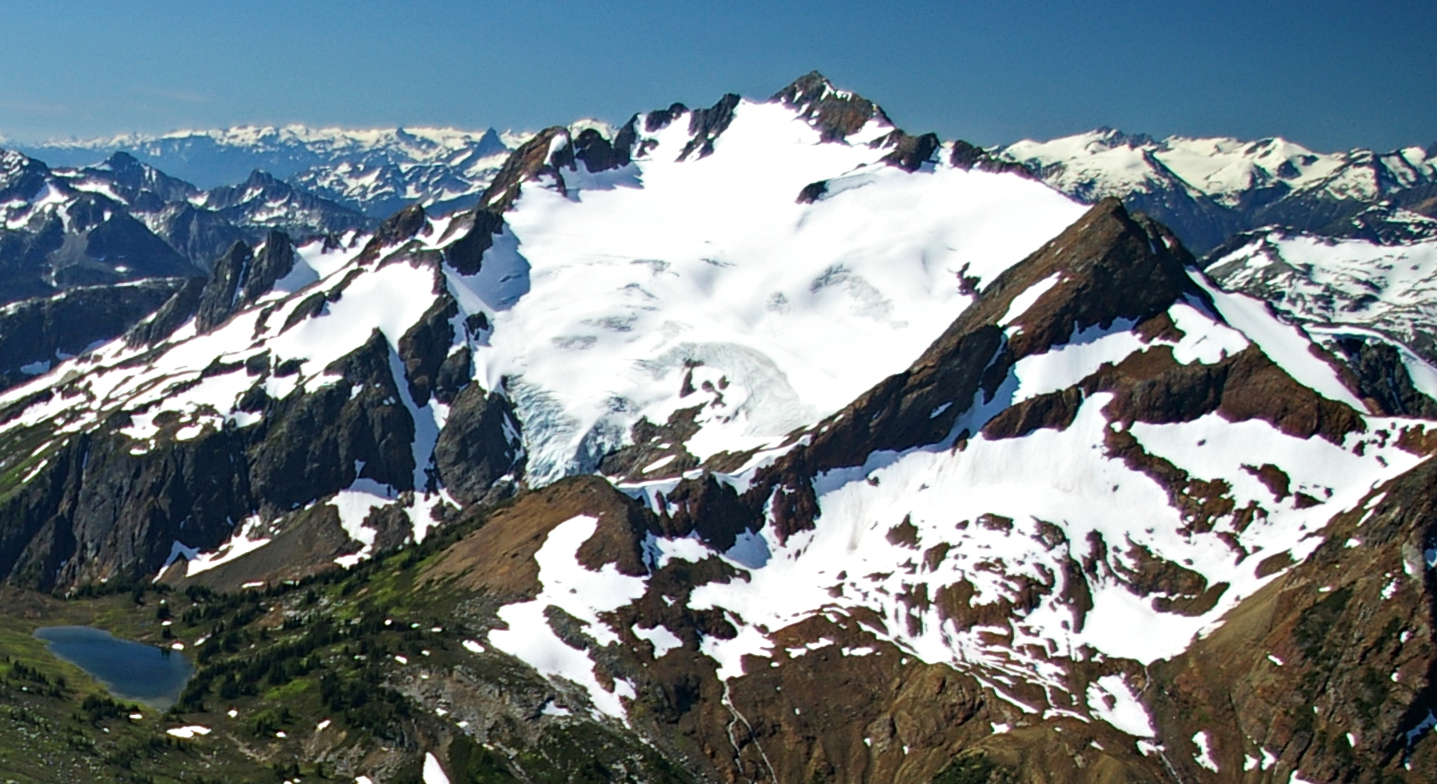
- Cayoosh Mountain, northern aspect

Highest point
- Elevation: 2,561 m (8,402 ft)
- Prominence: 671 m (2,201 ft)
- Parent peak: Mount Marriott (2735 m)
- Listing: Mountains of British Columbia
- Coordinates: 50°24′08″N 122°31′26″W

Geography
- Location within British Columbia Location within Canada
- Interactive map of Cayoosh Mountain
- Location: British Columbia, Canada
- Parent range: Cayoosh Range; Lillooet Ranges; Pacific Coast Ranges
- Topo map: NTS 92J7 Pemberton

Climbing
- Easiest route: Scrambling via South Ridge

Cayoosh Mountain is a 2,561-metre (8,402-foot) mountain summit located in the Cayoosh Range in southwestern British Columbia, Canada. It is situated 22 km (14 mi) east-northeast of Pemberton, 12 km (7 mi) north-northeast of Lillooet Lake, and immediately north of Cayoosh Pass. Its nearest higher peak is Mount Marriott, 5.43 km (3 mi) to the north-northeast. Precipitation runoff from the peak drains into Cayoosh Creek and other tributaries of the Fraser River. The mountain's name was submitted by Karl Ricker, a mountaineer, and was officially adopted on January 23, 1979, by the Geographical Names Board of Canada.

== Climate ==
Based on the Köppen climate classification, Cayoosh Mountain is located in a subarctic climate zone of western North America. Most weather fronts originate in the Pacific Ocean, and travel east toward the Coast Mountains where they are forced upward by the range (Orographic lift), causing them to drop their moisture in the form of rain or snowfall. As a result, the Coast Mountains experience high precipitation, especially during the winter months in the form of snowfall. Winter temperatures can drop below −20 °C with wind chill factors below −30 °C. This climate supports a glacier on the northeast slope of this mountain. The months July through September offer the most favorable weather for climbing Cayoosh Mountain.

== Climbing Routes ==
Established climbing routes on Cayoosh Mountain:

- East Face - a winter route
- Southwest Ridge - class 3 First ascent 1978
- South Ridge - class 3
- North Ridge - class 3

== Gallery ==
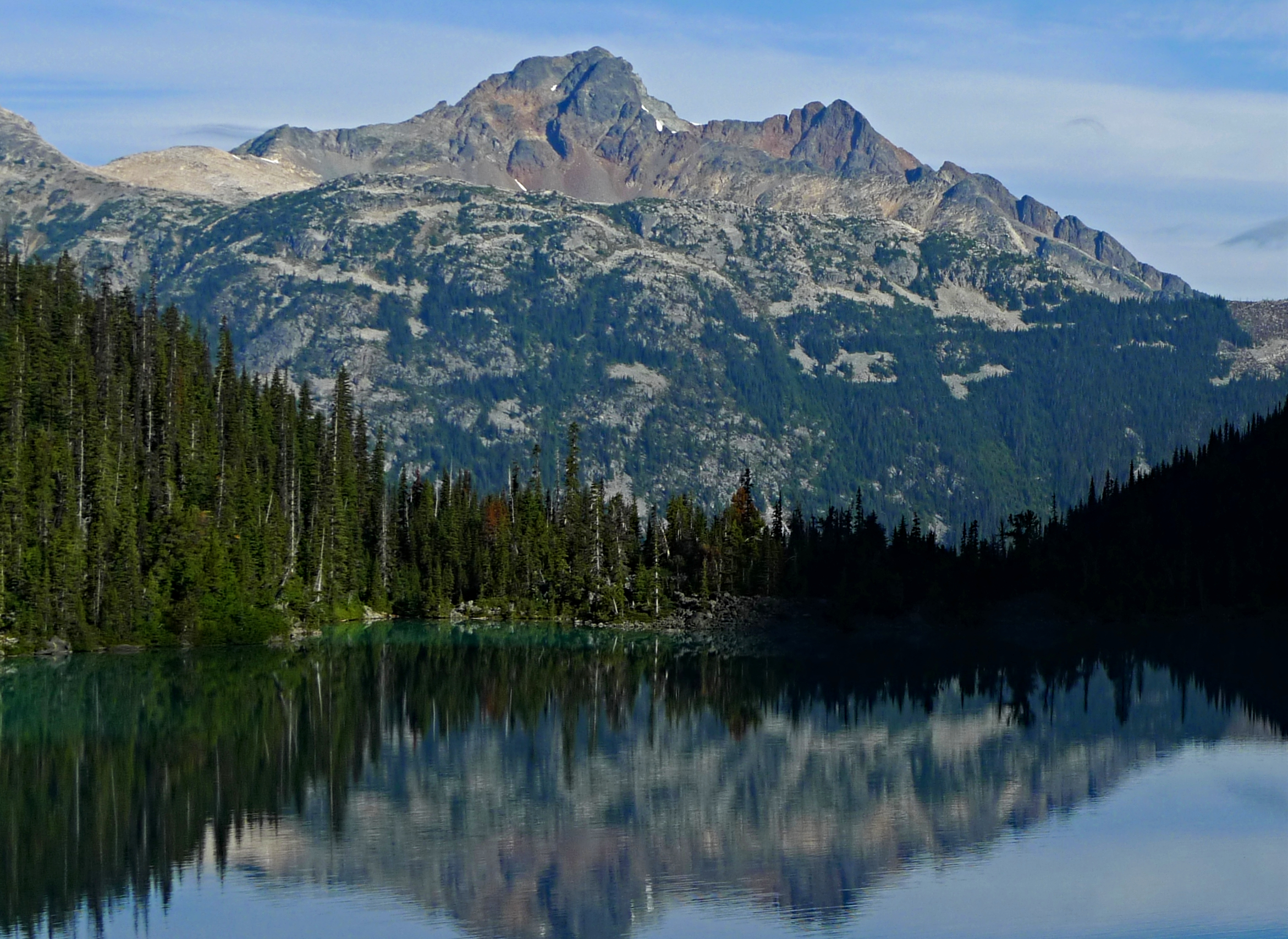
Cayoosh Mountain reflection

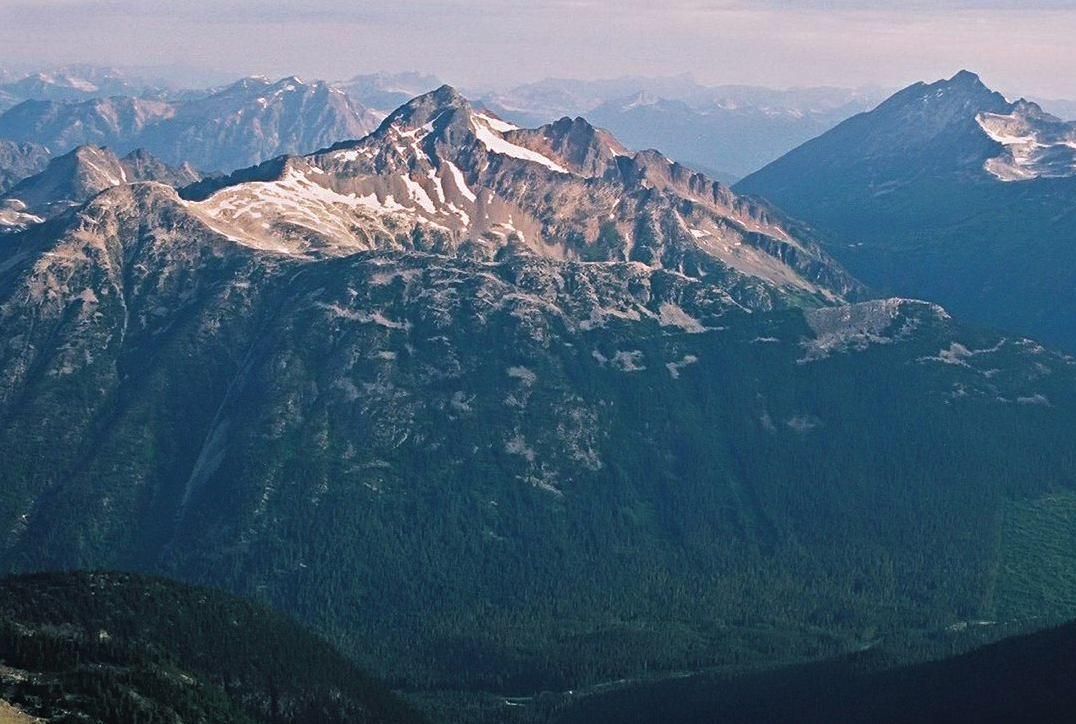
Cayoosh Mountain, southern aspect, as seen from Slalok Mountain
(Mt. Marriott in upper right)

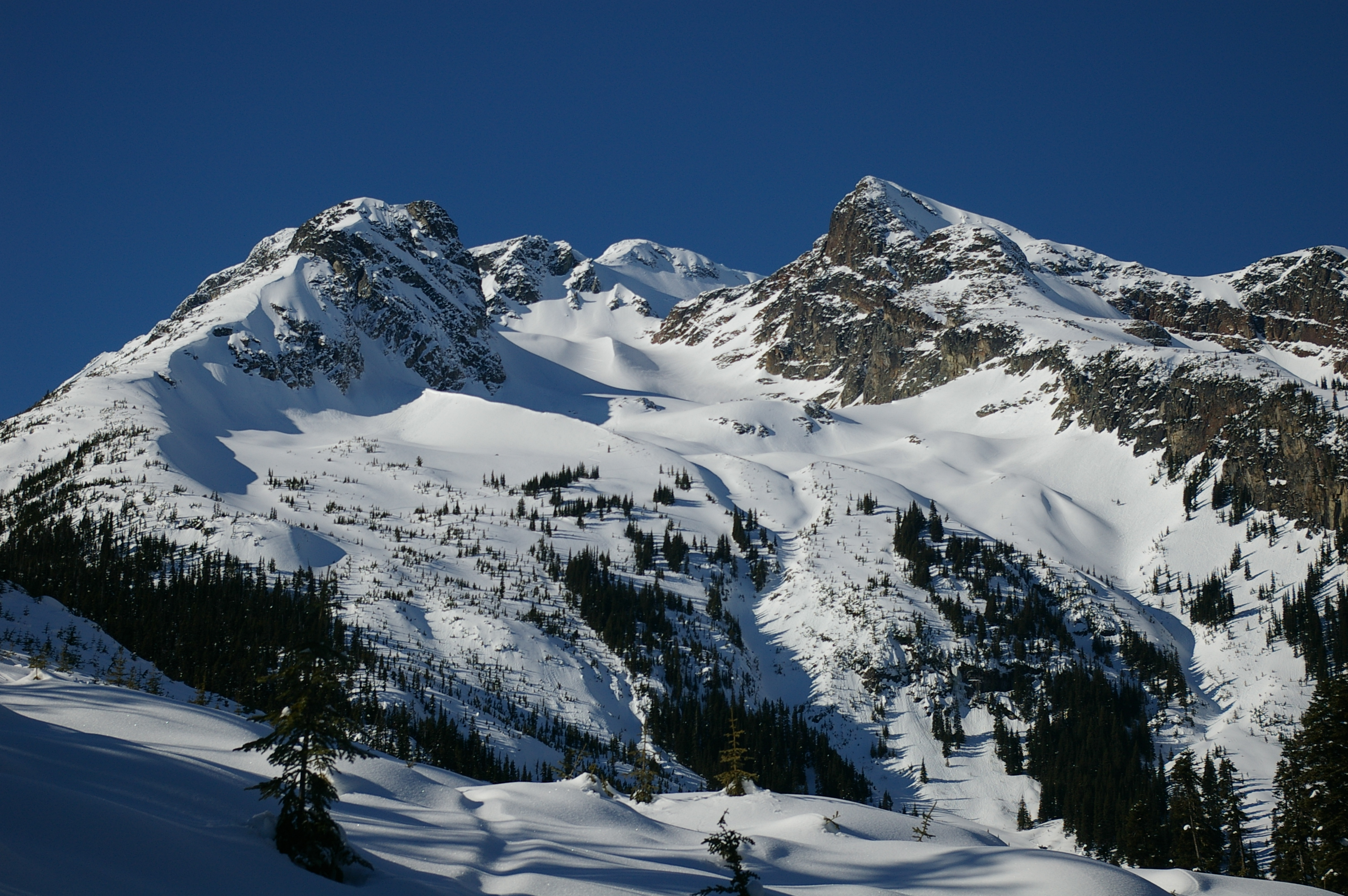
Cayoosh Mountain in winter

== See also ==
- Geography of British Columbia
- Geology of British Columbia
