= Mount Gardiner (British Columbia) =

Mountain in British Columbia, Canada

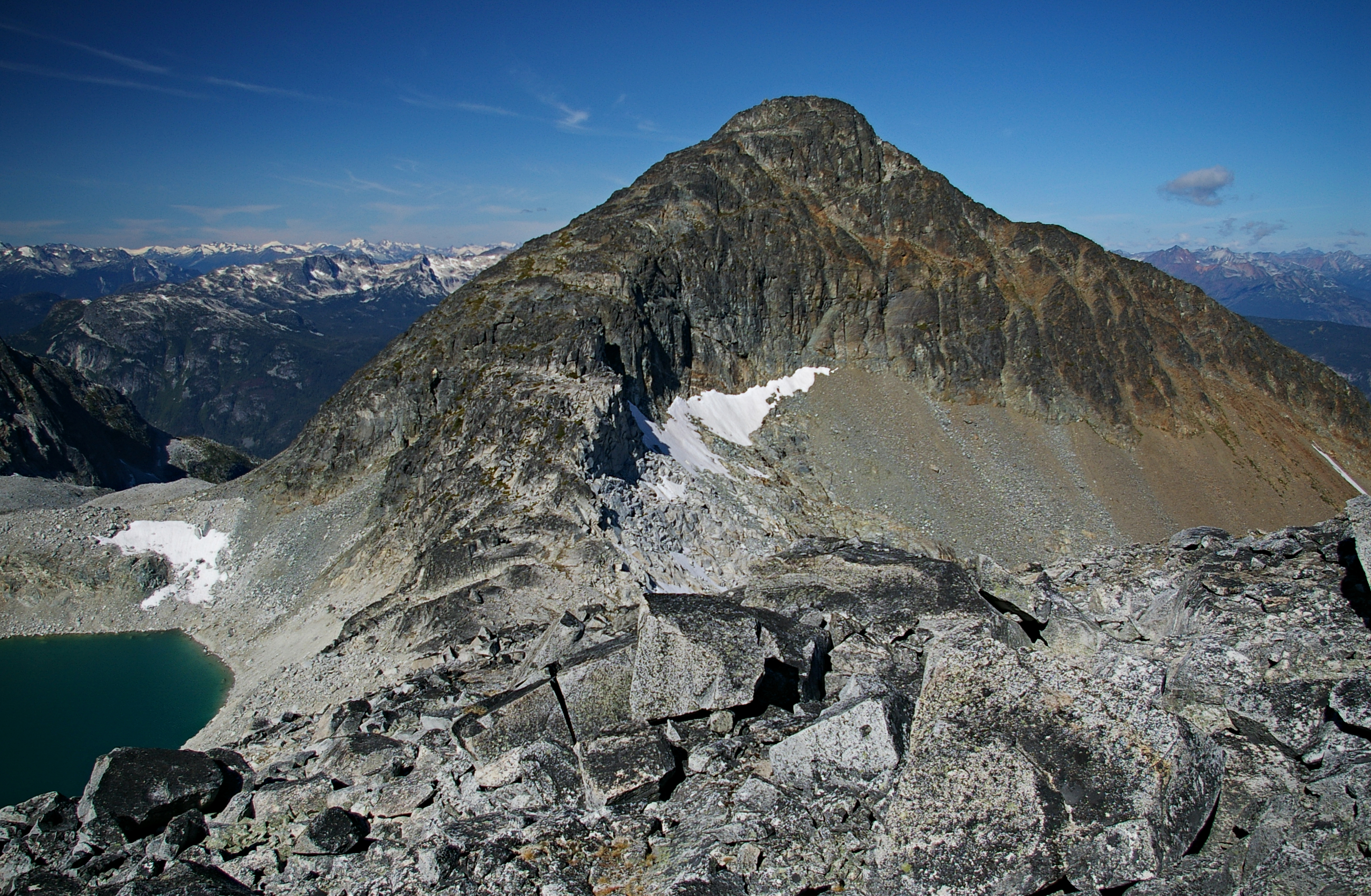
- Mount Gardiner, eastern aspect

Highest point
- Elevation: 2,406 m (7,894 ft)
- Prominence: 176 m (577 ft)
- Parent peak: Mount Oleg (2587 m)
- Listing: Mountains of British Columbia
- Coordinates: 50°25′30″N 122°37′26″W

Geography
- Location within British Columbia Location within Canada
- Interactive map of Mount Gardiner
- Location: British Columbia, Canada
- District: Lillooet Land District
- Parent range: Cayoosh Range; Lillooet Ranges; Coast Mountains
- Topo map: NTS 92J7 Pemberton

Climbing
- Easiest route: Scramble

Mount Gardiner is a 2,406-metre (7,894-foot) mountain summit located in the Cayoosh Range of the Lillooet Ranges, in southwestern British Columbia, Canada. It is situated 17 km (11 mi) northeast of Pemberton, immediately west of the Place Glacier, and 1.8 km (1 mi) north of Mount Oleg, its nearest higher peak. The mountain was named for William and Henry Gardiner, early settlers who farmed in Pemberton Meadows. The name was officially adopted on June 11, 1979, by the Geographical Names Board of Canada. Precipitation runoff from the peak drains into tributaries of the Fraser River.

== Climate ==
Based on the Köppen climate classification, Mount Gardiner is located in a subarctic climate zone of western North America. Most weather fronts originate in the Pacific Ocean, and travel east toward the Coast Mountains where they are forced upward by the range (Orographic lift), causing them to drop their moisture in the form of rain or snowfall. As a result, the Coast Mountains experience high precipitation, especially during the winter months in the form of snowfall. Temperatures can drop below −20 °C with wind chill factors below −30 °C. The months July through September offer the most favorable weather for climbing Mount Gardiner.

== Climbing Routes ==
Established climbing routes on Mount Gardiner:

- South Ridge
- Northeast Ridge - class 3

== Gallery ==
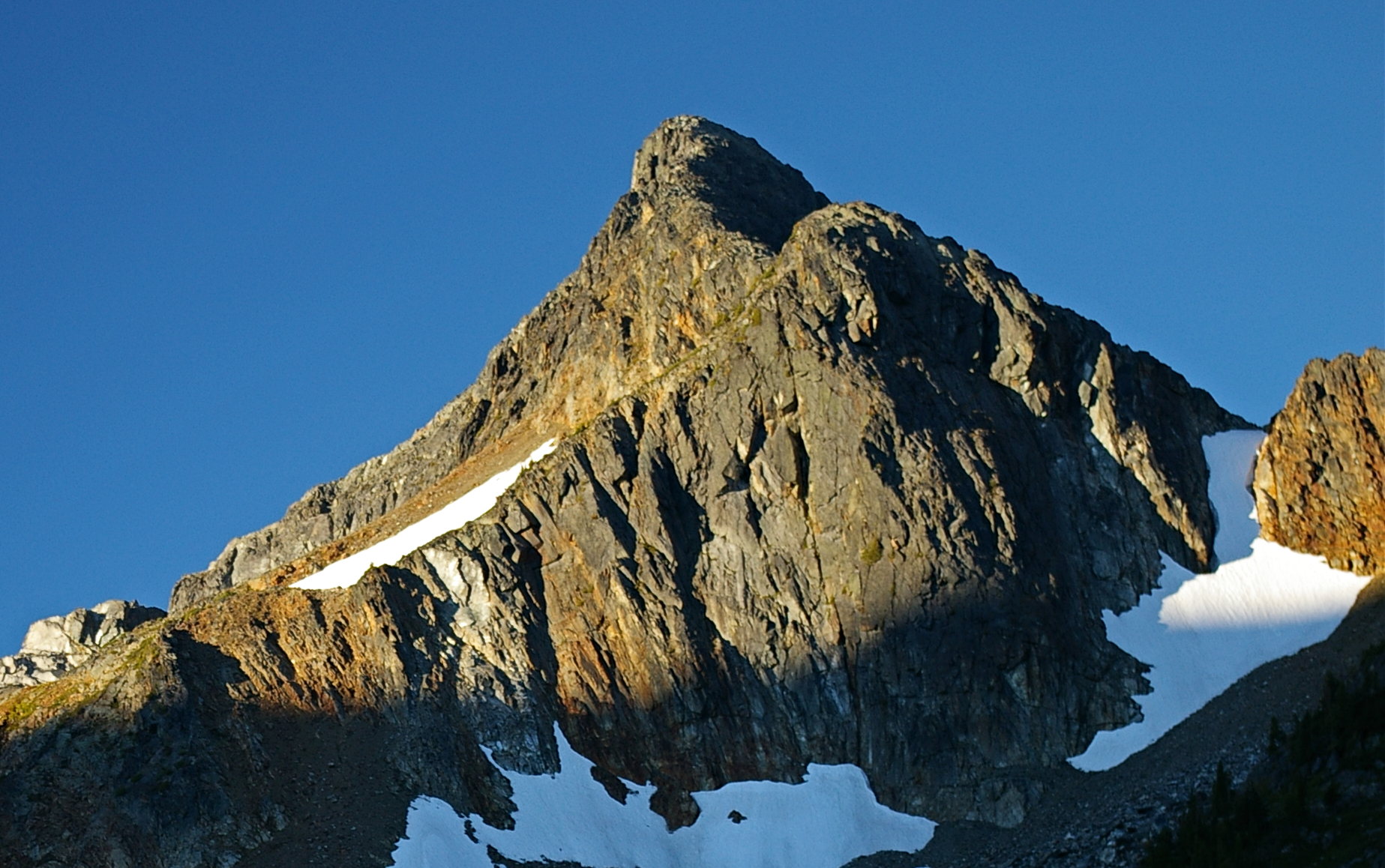
Mount Gardiner

== See also ==
- Geography of British Columbia
- Geology of British Columbia
