= Cayoosh Pass =

Mountain pass in British Columbia, Canada

- Location within British Columbia
- Elevation: 1,275 m (4,183 ft)
- Traversed by: Highway 99 (Duffey Lake Road)

Third Approach
- Location: British Columbia, Canada
- Range: Pacific Ranges
- Coordinates: 50°22′18″N 122°29′32″W
- Topo map: NTS 92J8 Duffey Lake

Cayoosh Pass (1,275 m / 4,183 ft) is a mountain pass in the Lillooet Ranges of the Pacific Ranges of the southern Coast Mountains in British Columbia, Canada. It lies just west of Duffey Lake on BC Highway 99 between the towns of Lillooet and Pemberton, formed by the headwaters of Cayoosh Creek to the east, flowing to the Fraser River at Lillooet, and Joffre Creek to the west, flowing steeply downhill to Lillooet Lake just southeast of the Mount Currie Indian Reserve.

Cayoosh Pass and the valleys of Cayoosh and Joffre Creeks form the southern boundary of the Cayoosh Range, a subrange of the Lillooet Ranges. Long known to the St'at'imc and Lil'wat peoples whose territories include it, the pass was first traversed by a non-indigenous person when James Duffey, a.k.a. "Sapper Duffy" of the Royal Engineers, investigated the route in 1859–1860 during a resurvey and reconstruction of the Douglas Road, the route of which passed the Joffre Creek foot of the pass and followed the northern perimeter of the Cayoosh Range. Cayoosh Pass was reported by Sapper Duffey to be too steep for wagons and any thought of a road by that route was shelved until the later 20th Century. Newer engineering techniques in the 1970s saw a surge in logging road construction in the Pemberton area, which came over the summit of the pass into valleys south of Duffey Lake. Logging roads from the Lillooet side eventually linked up with the Pemberton-side roads by the late 1970s and this route was ultimately chosen for the extension of Highway 99 northwards from Pemberton, over the other available routes were one via Railroad Pass and the Hurley River, to the north of Pemberton, and another via Anderson and Seton Lakes, the route followed by the railway.

== See also ==
- Duffey Lake Provincial Park
- Joffre Lakes Provincial Park
