= Mount Marriott =

Mountain in British Columbia, Canada

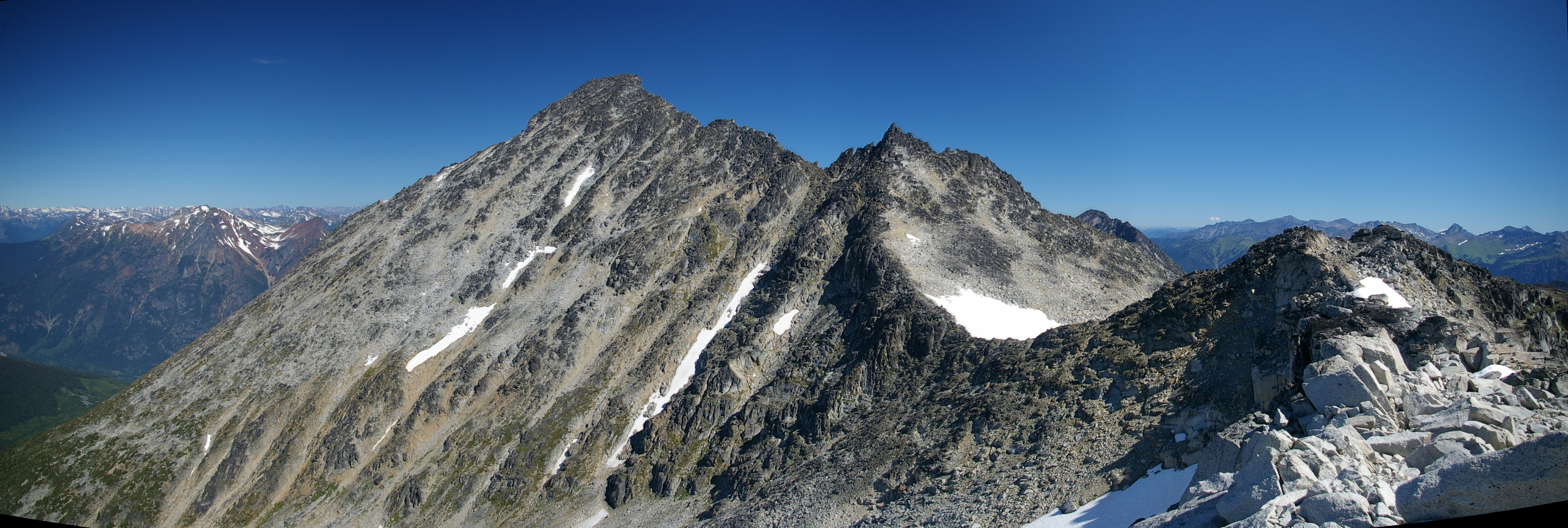

Highest point
- Elevation: 8,973 ft (2,735 m)
- Prominence: 2,470 ft (750 m)
- Coordinates: 50°27′14″N 122°30′36″W

Geography
- Location within British Columbia
- Location: British Columbia, Canada
- District: Lillooet Land District
- Parent range: Cayoosh Range
- Topo map: NTS 92J10 Birkenhead Lake

Climbing
- Easiest route: Scramble

Mount Marriott is a mountain located in British Columbia, Canada. It is a dry peak near the head of the Cayoosh Creek. Access to the basin below is easily reached by trail, and the summit can be reached by a class 3 scramble route. The best time to climb the mountain is during the months of July–September. There are a few lakes in close proximity to the mountain peak that are swimmable during the months of August and September.

The mountain was named in honor of RCAF Flying Officer Terrence James Marriott, who was killed in 1943, while fighting in World War II.
