= Arras Mountain =

Mountain in British Columbia, Canada

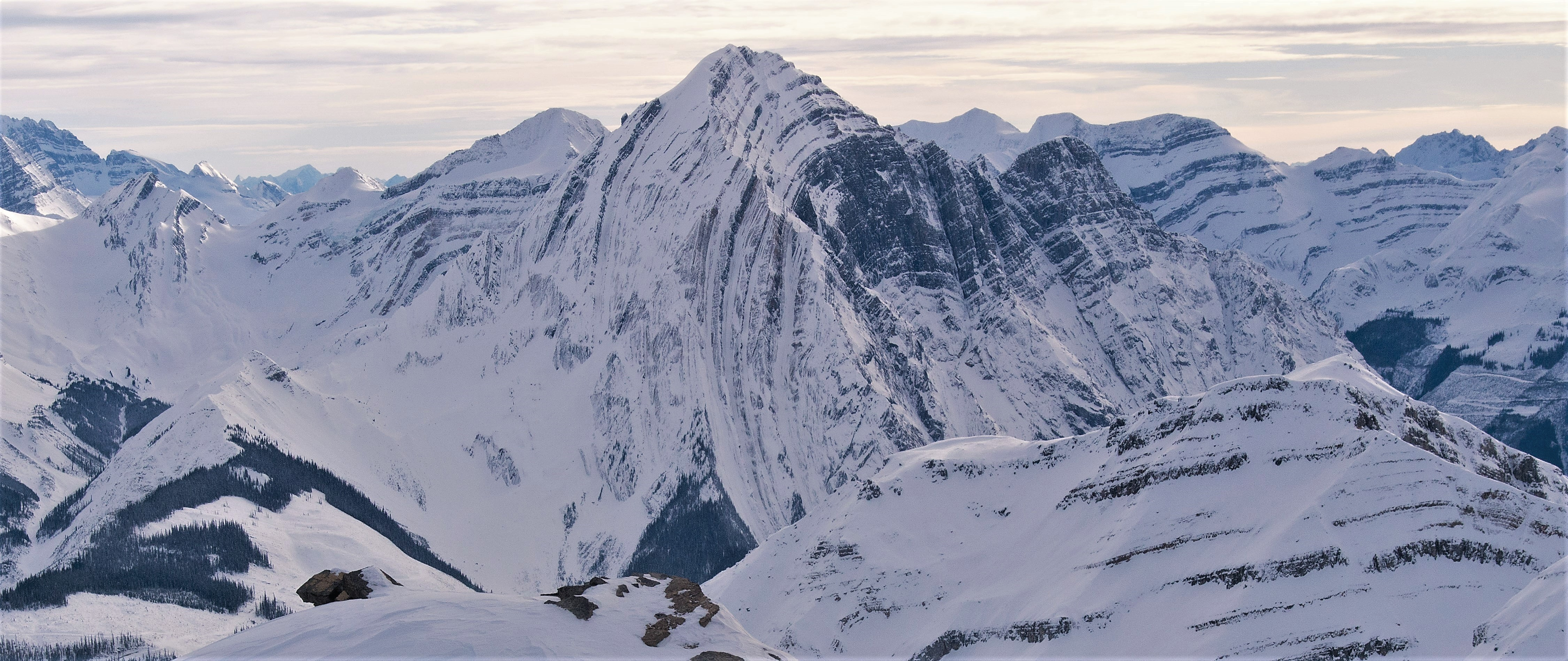
- Northwest aspect in winter

Highest point
- Elevation: 3,090 m (10,140 ft)
- Prominence: 1,699 ft (518 m)
- Parent peak: Valenciennes Mountain (3,150 m)
- Isolation: 3.4 mi (5.5 km)
- Listing: Mountains of British Columbia
- Coordinates: 51°48′34″N 117°04′54″W

Geography
- Location within British Columbia Location within Canada
- Interactive map of Arras Mountain
- Country: Canada
- Province: British Columbia
- District: Kootenay Land District
- Parent range: Canadian Rockies
- Topo map: NTS 82N14 Rostrum Peak

Geology
- Rock age: Cambrian
- Rock type: sedimentary rock

Climbing
- Easiest route: Mountaineering

Arras Mountain is a 3,090-metre (10,138 ft) mountain summit located in the Canadian Rockies of British Columbia, Canada. Arras Mountain is situated immediately northeast of the confluence of Icefall Brook with Valenciennes River, 7.2 km (4.5 mi) east-southeast of Rostrum Peak, and 6 km (3.7 mi) west of Valenciennes Mountain, and all are in the Kootenay Land District. The peak was named in 1921 to commemorate the World War I battlefield at Arras, France, where Canadian troops fought in the first battle April 1917, and in the second battle August 1918. The name was officially adopted in 1924 when approved by the Geographical Names Board of Canada.

== Geology ==
Arras Mountain is composed of sedimentary rock laid down during the Precambrian to Jurassic periods. Formed in shallow seas, this sedimentary rock was pushed east and over the top of younger rock during the Laramide orogeny. The northwest aspect of the mountain conspicuously displays vertically-tilted anticlinal strata. Topographic relief is significant as the west aspect of the peak rises over 2,000 m (6,600 ft) above Icefall Brook in less than two kilometres.

== Climate ==
Based on the Köppen climate classification, Arras Mountain is located in a subarctic climate zone with cold, snowy winters, and mild summers. Winter temperatures can drop below −20 °C with wind chill factors below −30 °C. Precipitation runoff drains to the Icefall Brook and Valenciennes River.

== Gallery ==
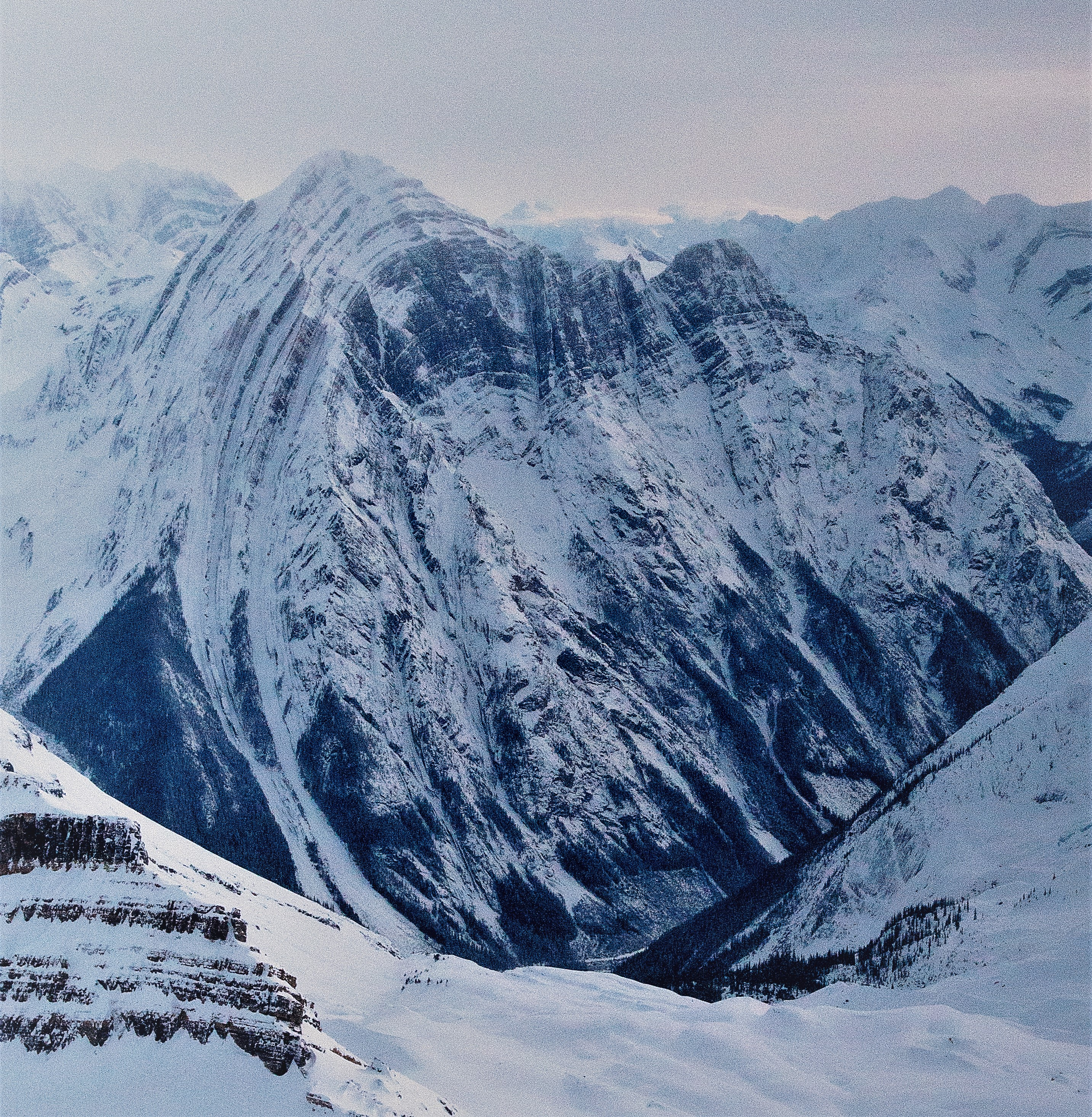
Arras Mountain

== See also ==
- Geography of British Columbia
