= St. Julien Mountain =

Mountain in Alberta/British Columbia, Canada

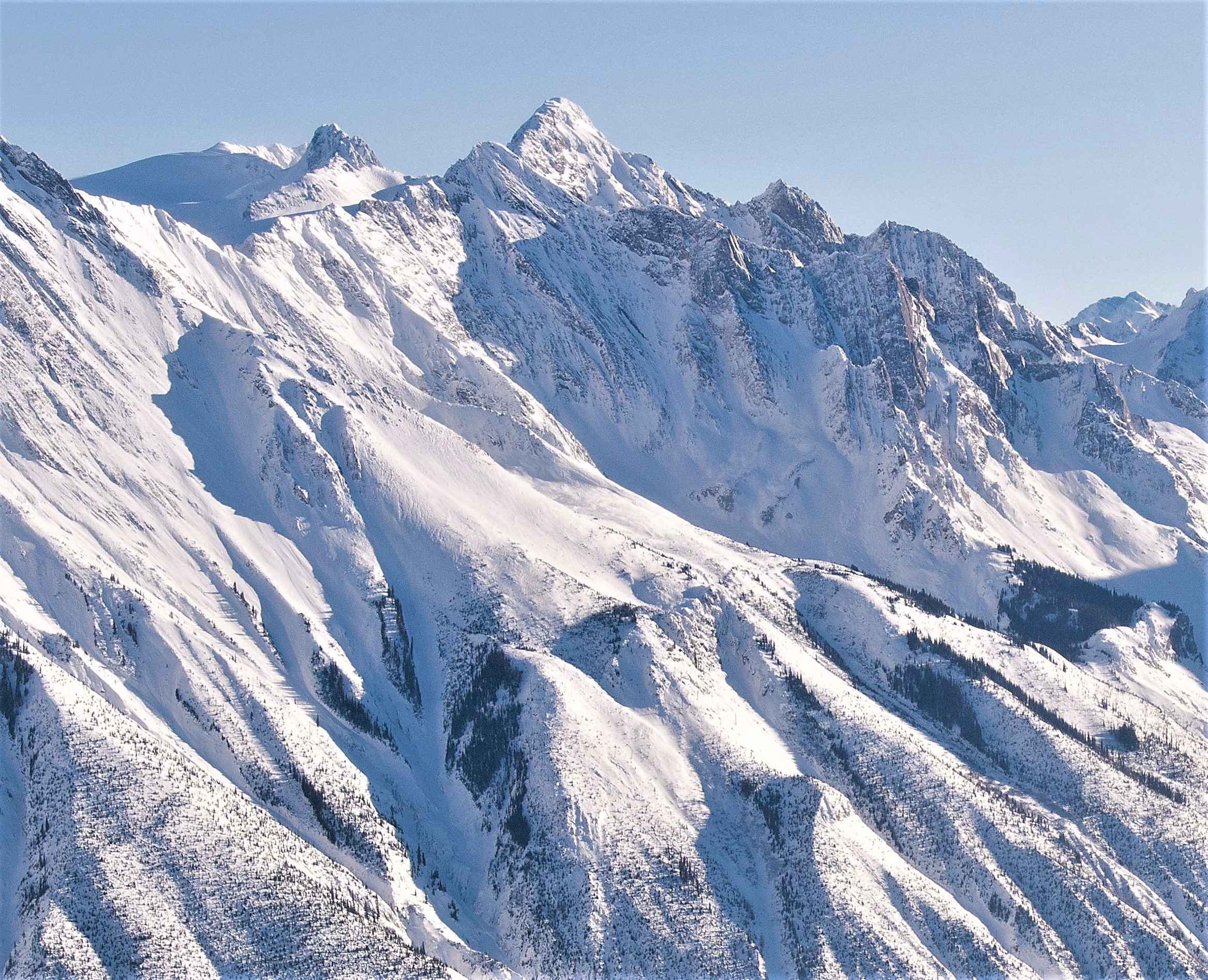
- West-northwest aspect in winter

Highest point
- Elevation: 3,090 m (10,140 ft)
- Prominence: 122 m (400 ft)
- Parent peak: Messines Mountain
- Isolation: 0.77 mi (1.24 km)
- Listing: Mountains of Alberta; Mountains of British Columbia
- Coordinates: 51°50′13″N 117°00′33″W

Geography
- Location within Alberta Location within British Columbia Location within Canada
- Interactive map of St. Julien Mountain
- Country: Canada
- Provinces: Alberta and British Columbia
- Protected area: Banff National Park
- Parent range: Park Ranges ← Canadian Rockies
- Topo map: NTS 82N14 Rostrum Peak

Geology
- Rock age: Cambrian
- Rock type: Sedimentary rock

Climbing
- First ascent: 1930
- Easiest route: Mountaineering

St. Julien Mountain is a 3,090-metre (10,138 ft) mountain summit located in the Canadian Rockies of British Columbia, Canada. It is situated on the British Columbia-Alberta border, as well as the Continental Divide, and the west boundary of Banff National Park. Neighbors include Mount Forbes 6.4 km (4.0 mi) to the east-northeast, Valenciennes Mountain 2.8 km (1.7 mi) to the south, and Icefall Peak is 12 km (7.5 mi) to the west.

== History ==
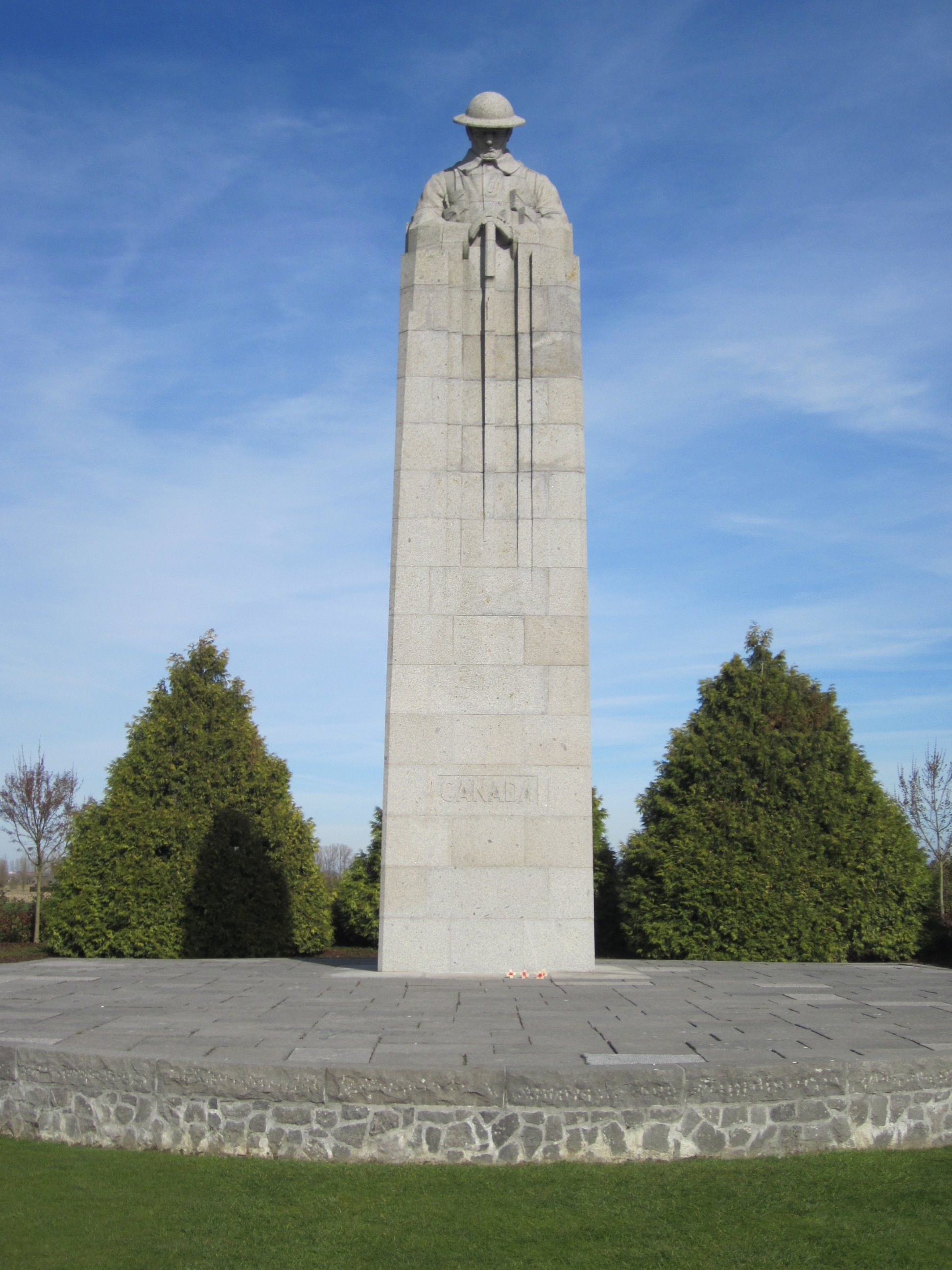
Memorial to Canadian troops at St. Julien

The mountain's toponym was proposed in 1919 by Arthur Oliver Wheeler to commemorate the hamlet of St. Julien, Belgium, where Canadian troops gallantly fought the Battle of St. Julien in 1915 during World War I. The battle was the first mass use by Germany of poison gas on the Western Front. It also marked the first time a former colonial force (the 1st Canadian Division) defeated a European power (the German Empire) in Europe. The toponym was officially adopted in 1920 when approved by the Geographical Names Board of Canada. The first ascent of the mountain was made in 1930 by D. Duncan and A. F. Megrew.

== Geology ==
St. Julien Mountain is composed of sedimentary rock laid down during the Precambrian to Jurassic periods. Formed in shallow seas, this sedimentary rock was pushed east and over the top of younger rock during the Laramide orogeny. Precipitation runoff drains into Mons Creek from the south slope, eventually reaching the Columbia River, and Forbes Creek from the north, a tributary of Howse River.

== Climate ==
Based on the Köppen climate classification, St. Julien Mountain is located in a subarctic climate zone with cold, snowy winters, and mild summers. Temperatures can drop below −20 °C with wind chill factors below −30 °C. This climate supports the Mons Icefield to the immediate north.

== Gallery ==
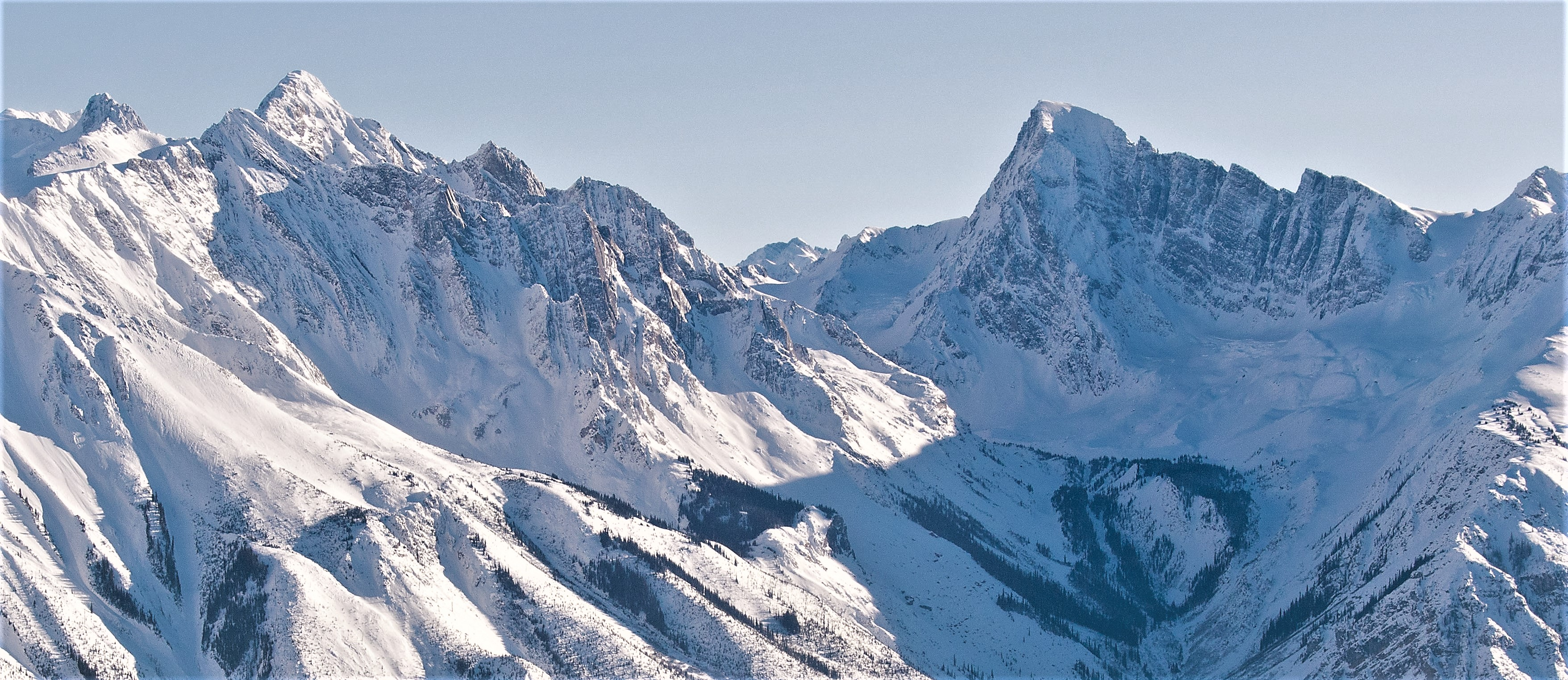
St. Julien Mountain (left) and Valenciennes Mountain (right)

== See also ==
- Geography of British Columbia
