= Bush Pass =

Mountain pass in the Canadian Rockies

- Location within Alberta Location within British Columbia

Third Approach
- Location: Alberta and British Columbia, Canada
- Range: Canadian Rockies
- Coordinates: 51°48′00″N 116°58′00″W
- Topo map: NTS 82N15 Mistaya Lake

Bush Pass is a mountain pass in the Canadian Rockies, on the border between the Canadian provinces of Alberta and British Columbia. It is located at the headwaters of the Valenciennes River, formerly known as the South Fork Bush River; the North Fork Bush River is now known as the Bush River.

== See also ==
- List of mountain passes
