= Walter Peak =

Walter Peak may refer to:

- Walter Peak (Canada), on the border of Alberta and British Columbia
- Walter Peak (New Zealand), near Queenstown, South Island
