= Walter Peak (Canada) =

Mountain in Alberta and British Columbia, Canada

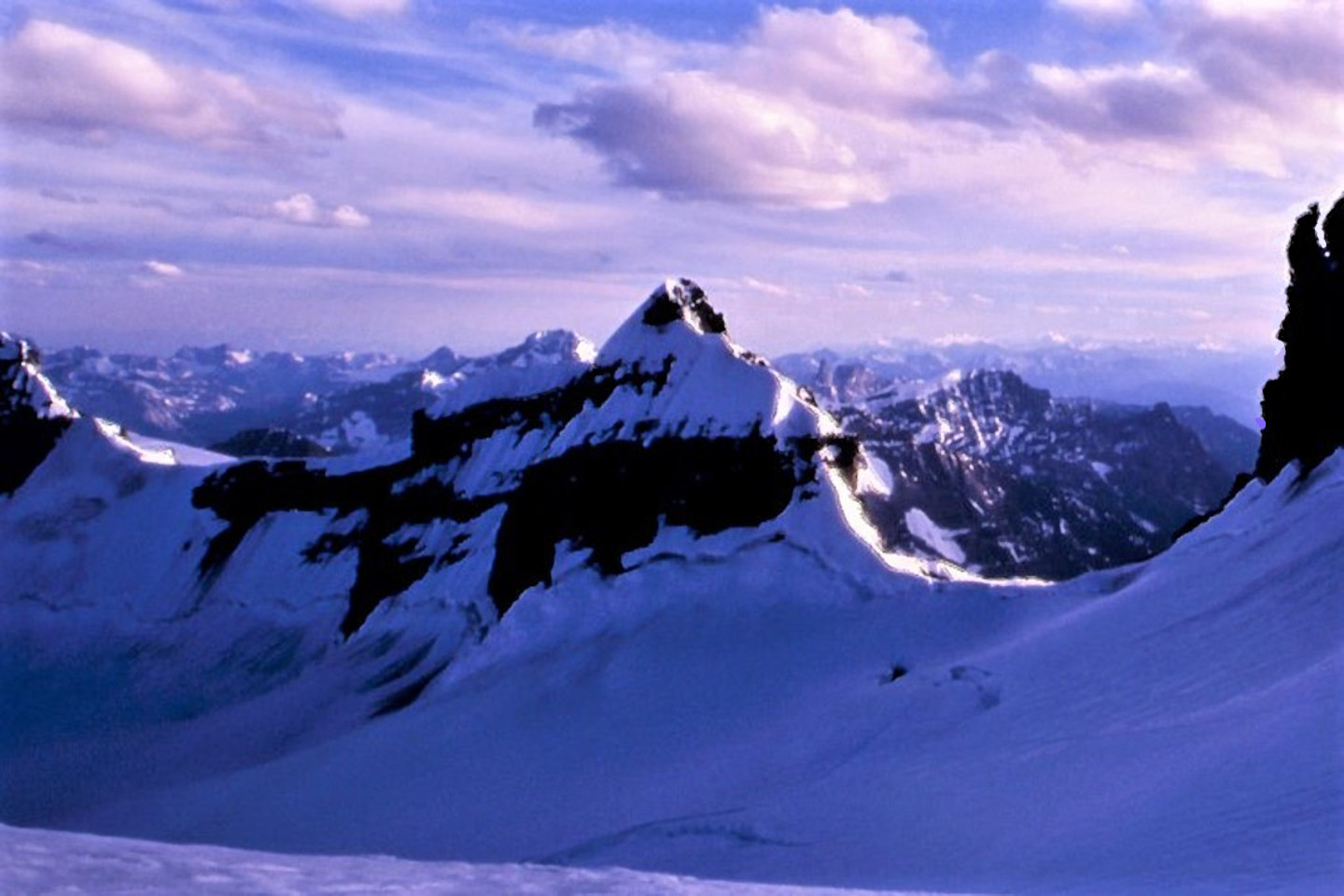

Highest point
- Elevation: 3,401 m (11,158 ft) (Note: Other sources give 3,448 m)
- Prominence: 143 m (469 ft)
- Parent peak: Mount Lyell (3498 m)
- Listing: Mountains of Alberta; Mountains of British Columbia
- Coordinates: 51°57′08″N 117°06′08″W

Geography
- Location within Alberta Location within British Columbia Location within Canada
- Country: Canada
- Provinces: Alberta and British Columbia
- Parent range: Park Ranges
- Topo map: NTS 82N14 Rostrum Peak

Climbing
- First ascent: 1927 D. Duncan, T. Lynes, J. Simpson, guided by Ernest Feuz

Walter Peak - a.k.a. Lyell 4 or L4 - is the fourth highest of five distinct subpeaks on Mount Lyell, three of which are located on the border of Alberta and British Columbia (Christian, Walter and Ernest Peaks). It was named in 1972 by Sydney R. Vallance after Walter Feuz, an early mountain guide in the Rockies.

"Walter Feuz (1894-1986) never took out an official guide's license since he was underage when he left his family home in Interlaken, CH, but was trained up for the work by his older brothers, Edward, Jr. and Ernest."

== Geology and climate ==
Due to the close proximity of this peak to the central and highest peak (0.6 km (0.4 mi)), see Mount Lyell for geology and climate.

== Gallery ==
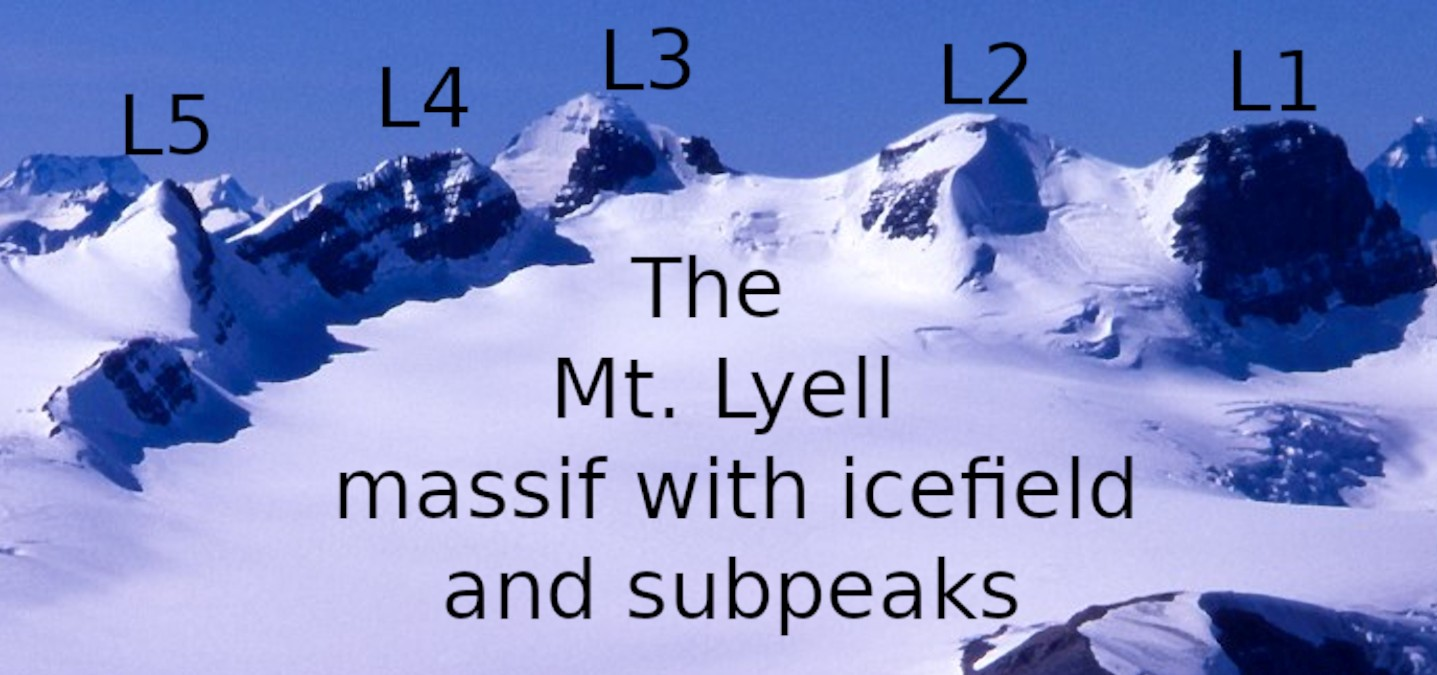
Mount Lyell and its 5 subpeaks: L1-L5

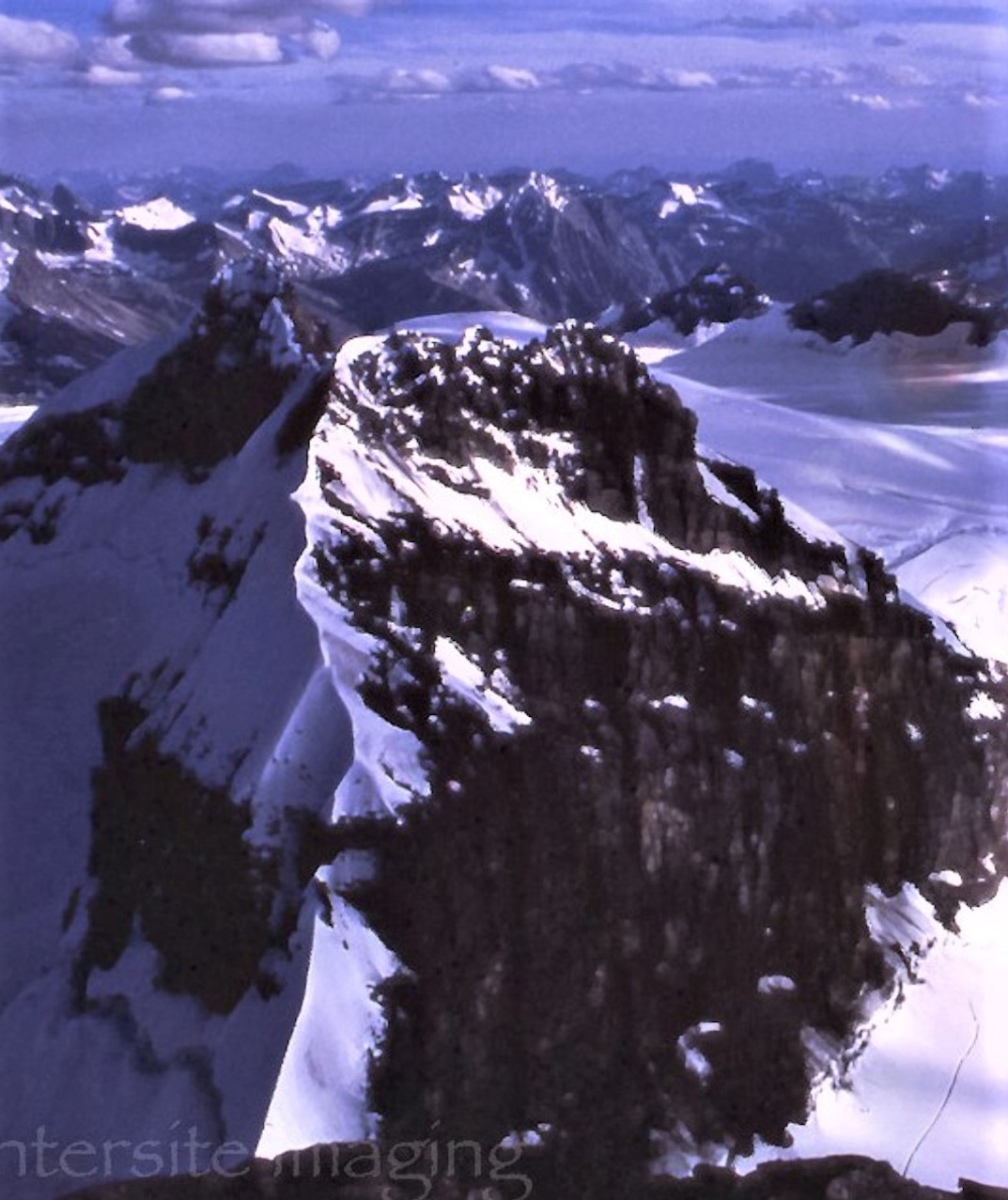
Mount Lyell 4 (Walter Peak) from Lyell 3 (Ernest Peak); (i.e. Mt. Lyell's summit)

== See also ==
- List of peaks on the Alberta–British Columbia border
