= Christian Peak =

Mountain in Alberta and British Columbia, Canada

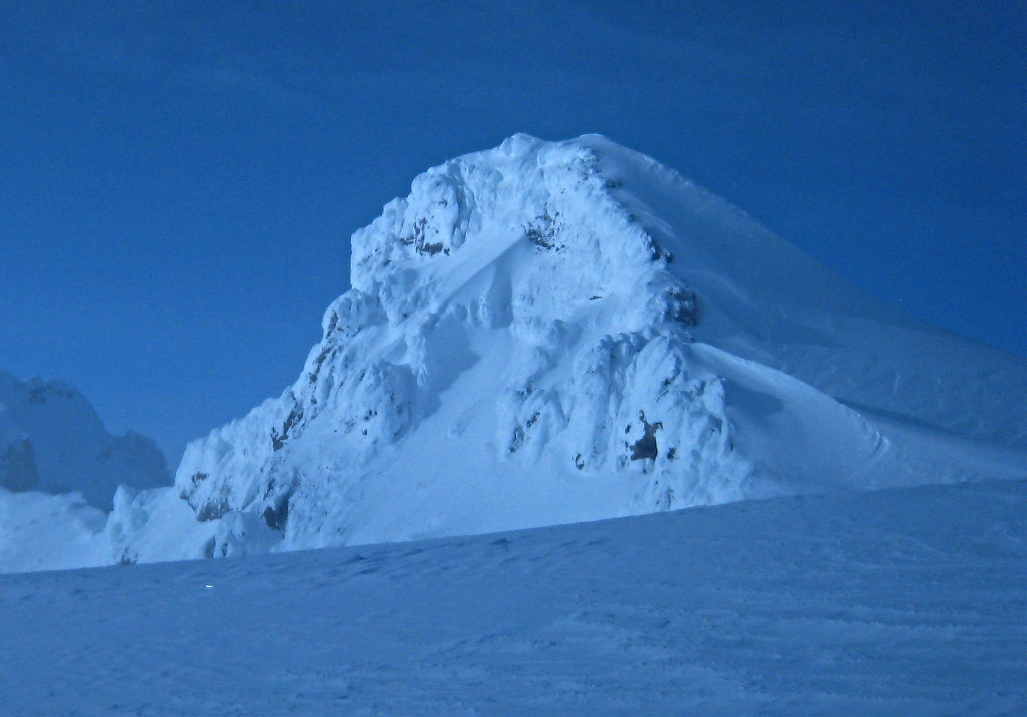

Highest point
- Elevation: 3,406 m (11,175 ft)
- Prominence: 100 m (330 ft)
- Listing: Mountains of Alberta; Mountains of British Columbia
- Coordinates: 51°56′37″N 117°05′52″W

Geography
- Location within Alberta Location within British Columbia Location within Canada
- Country: Canada
- Provinces: Alberta and British Columbia
- Protected area: Banff National Park
- Parent range: Park Ranges
- Topo map: NTS 82N14 Rostrum Peak

Climbing
- First ascent: 1926 by Alfred J. Ostheimer, M.M. Strumia, J. Monroe Thorington

Christian Peak - a.k.a. Lyell 5 or L5 - is the least tall of five distinct subpeaks on Mount Lyell (Canada) and is located on the border of Alberta and British Columbia. It was named in 1972 by Sydney R. Vallance after Christian Hässler, Jr.

== Geology and climate ==
Due to the close proximity of this peak to the central peak (1.6 km (1 mi)), see Mount Lyell for geology and climate.

== See also ==
- List of peaks on the British Columbia–Alberta border
