= Valenciennes (disambiguation) =

Valenciennes can mean:

- Valenciennes, a town and commune on the Scheldt river in the Nord département of northern France.
- Valenciennes FC a football (soccer) club from Valenciennes.
- Valenciennes lace
- Herman de Valenciennes, 12th century French poet.
- Achille Valenciennes (1794–1865), French zoologist.
- Pierre-Henri de Valenciennes (1750-1819), French painter
- Valenciennes Mountain, a summit in British Columbia, Canada
- Valenciennes River, a river in the Rocky Mountains of British Columbia, Canada
