= Mount Lyell (Canada) =

Mountain in Alberta and British Columbia, Canada

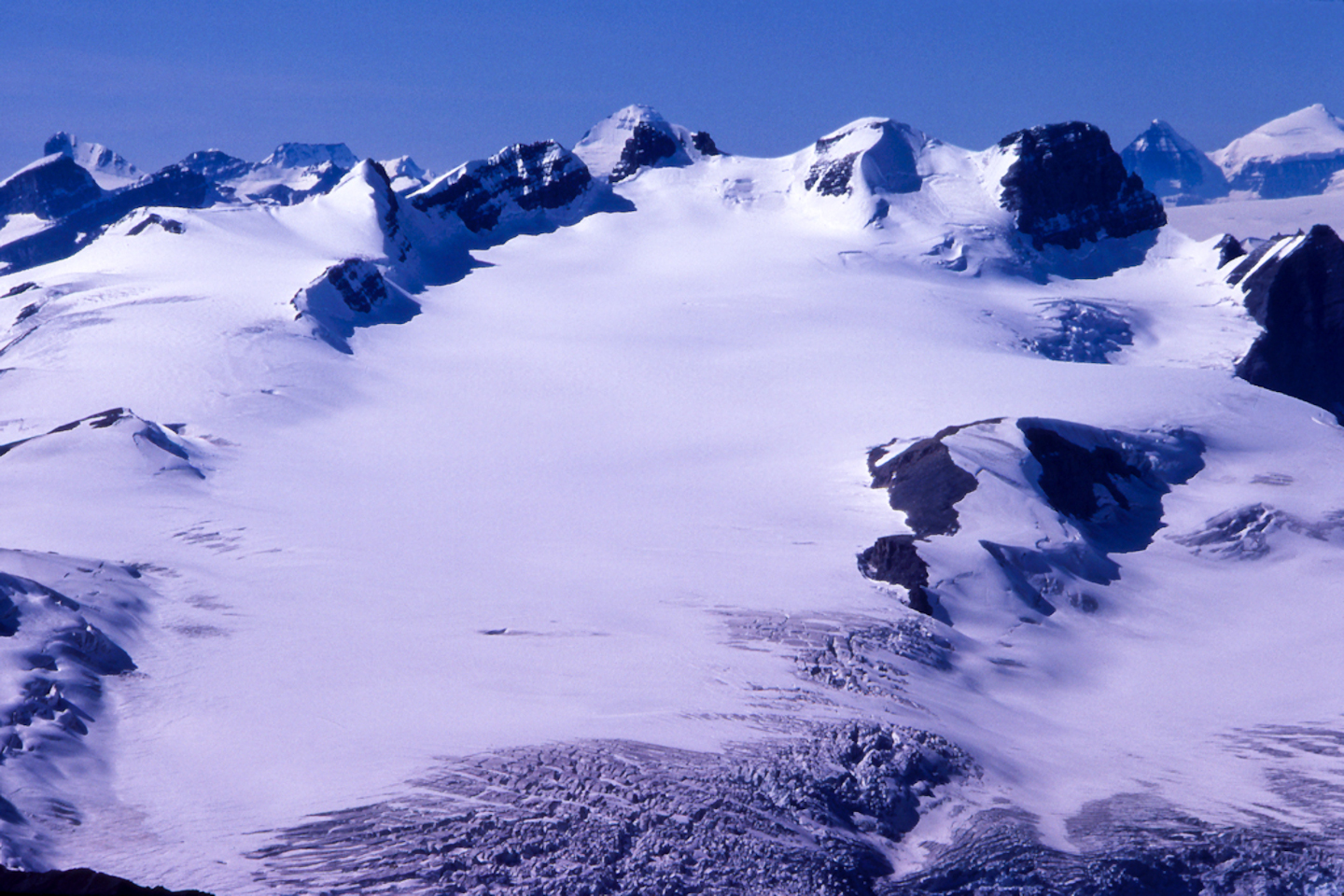
- Mt. Lyell & its 5 subpeaks, plus the Lyell Icefield, taken from Mt. Forbes (Columbia Icefield peaks on the horizon - click image for more details)

Highest point
- Elevation: 3,498 m (11,476 ft)
- Prominence: 1,078 m (3,537 ft)
- Parent peak: Mount Forbes
- Listing: Mountains of Alberta; Mountains of British Columbia
- Coordinates: 51°57′24″N 117°06′12″W

Geography
- Location within Alberta Location within British Columbia Location within Canada
- Interactive map of Mount Lyell
- Country: Canada
- Provinces: Alberta and British Columbia
- Parent range: Lyell Group, Central Icefields; Canadian Rockies
- Topo map: NTS 82N14 Rostrum Peak

Climbing
- First ascent: 1902, James Outram, guided by Christian Kaufmann

Mount Lyell is a mountain on the Alberta–British Columbia border in western Canada. Comprising five distinct summits, Mount Lyell reaches a height of 3,498 m (11,476 ft). The mountain was named by James Hector in 1858 in recognition of Scottish geologist Sir Charles Lyell.

== Geography ==
Mount Lyell is located on the Great Divide, which forms the BC-Alberta boundary in this area, in Banff National Park. Collectively, the five peaks, and the Mt. Lyell massif itself, are commonly referred to as 'the Lyells'. The mountain is the highest in the Lyell Group, a subrange of the Central Icefields in the Canadian Rockies.

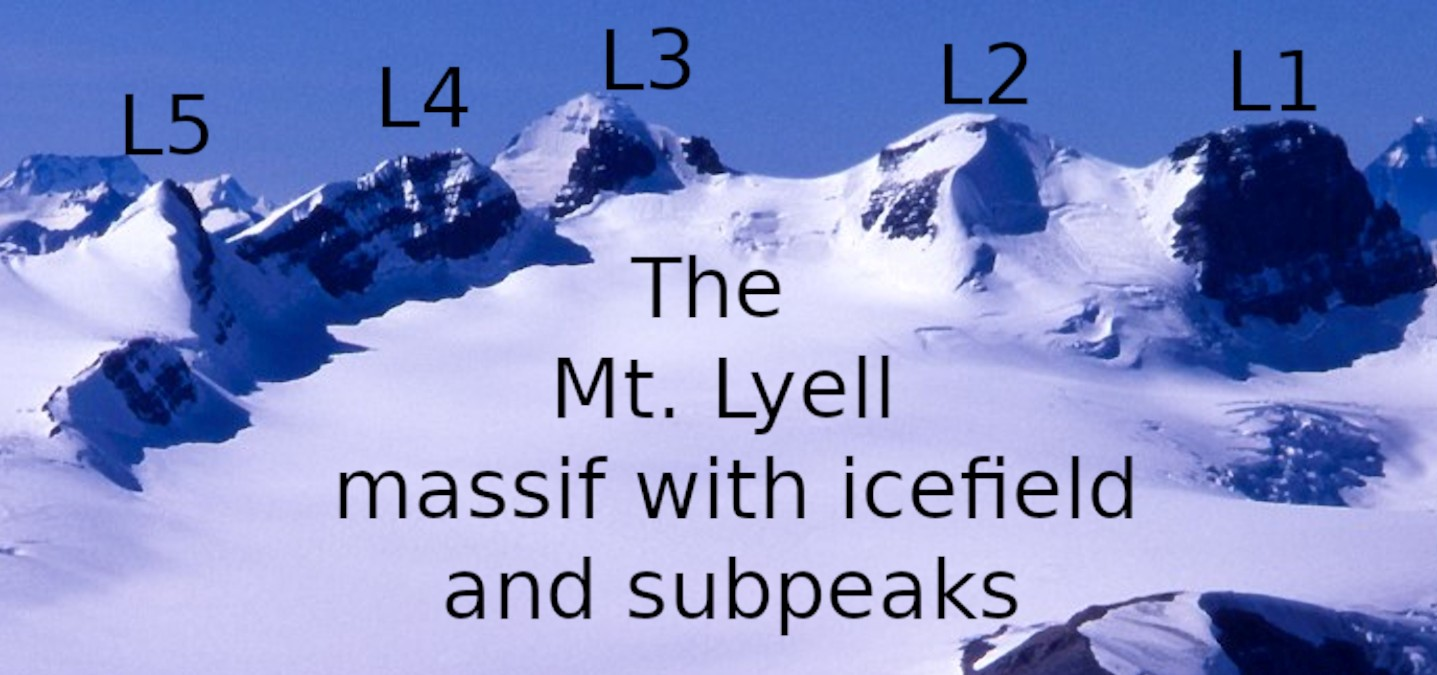
Mt. Lyell and its 5 subpeaks: L1-L5

In 1972, five distinct peaks on Mt. Lyell (formerly referred to as only Lyell 1 through 5 or L1 through L5), were named after Swiss mountain guides who settled in Golden, British Columbia in 1912. Running south to north along the interprovincial boundary, these peaks are: Christian Peak (L5), Walter Peak (L4), and Ernest Peak (L3), named after Christian Hässler, Walter Feuz and Ernest Feuz. Located entirely in Alberta are Edward Peak (L2) and Rudolph Peak (L1), named after Edward Feuz Jr. and Rudolph Aemmer.

Mount Lyell marks the limit between the South Saskatchewan and Columbia watersheds.

== Geology ==
Mount Lyell is composed of sedimentary rock laid down during the Precambrian to Jurassic periods. Formed in shallow seas, this sedimentary rock was pushed east and over the top of younger rock during the Laramide orogeny. The Lyell Formation is named after Mount Lyell. Geology for all five subpeaks is identical due to their proximity to the central peak (maximum distance: 1.6 km or 1 mile).

== Climate ==
Based on the Köppen climate classification, Mount Lyell is located in a subarctic climate with cold, snowy winters, and mild summers. Temperatures can drop below −20 °C (−4 °F) with wind chill factors below −30 °C (−22 °F).

== Gallery ==
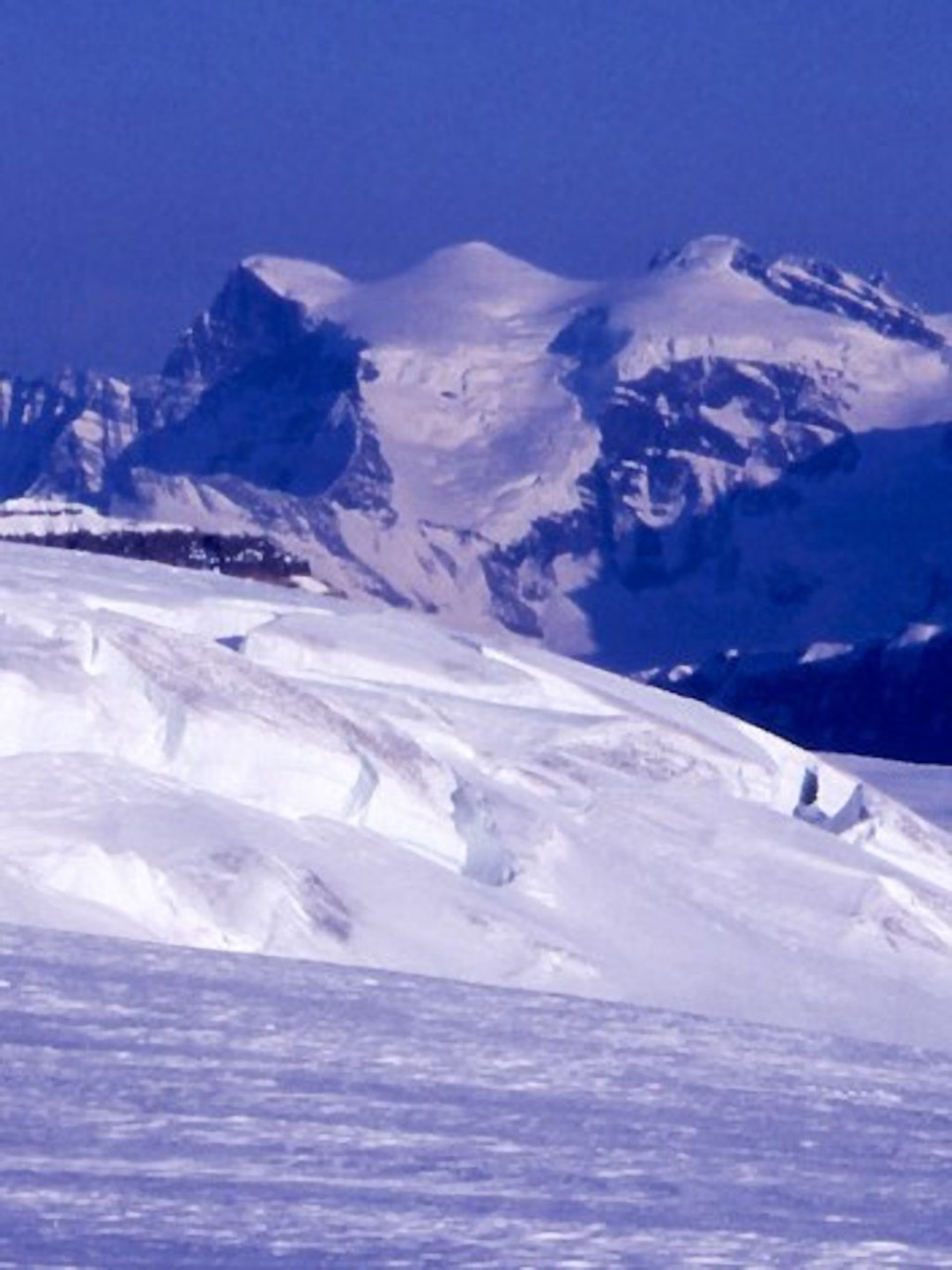
Mount Lyell 1, 2 & 3 from the Columbia Icefield

== See also ==
- List of mountains of Canada
