= Bush River (British Columbia) =

The Bush River is a tributary of the Columbia River in the Columbia Country of southeastern British Columbia, Canada, entering that river via the Bush Arm of Kinbasket Lake. Named for the dense vegetation lining its banks, its headwaters are at 52°05′N 117°30′W, in the Rocky Mountains. Its former confluence with the Columbia was at 51°44′30″N 117°38′10″W, now beneath the waters of Bush Arm; a few miles above the river's new mouth is the confluence of the Valenciennes River. The Bush has also been designated the North Fork Bush River, while the Valenciennes was known as the South Fork Bush River (renamed in 1918); — Bush Pass is at the head of the Valenciennes, rather than the Bush.

== See also ==
- Tributaries of the Columbia River
- List of rivers of British Columbia
