= Valenciennes Mountain =

Mountain in British Columbia, Canada

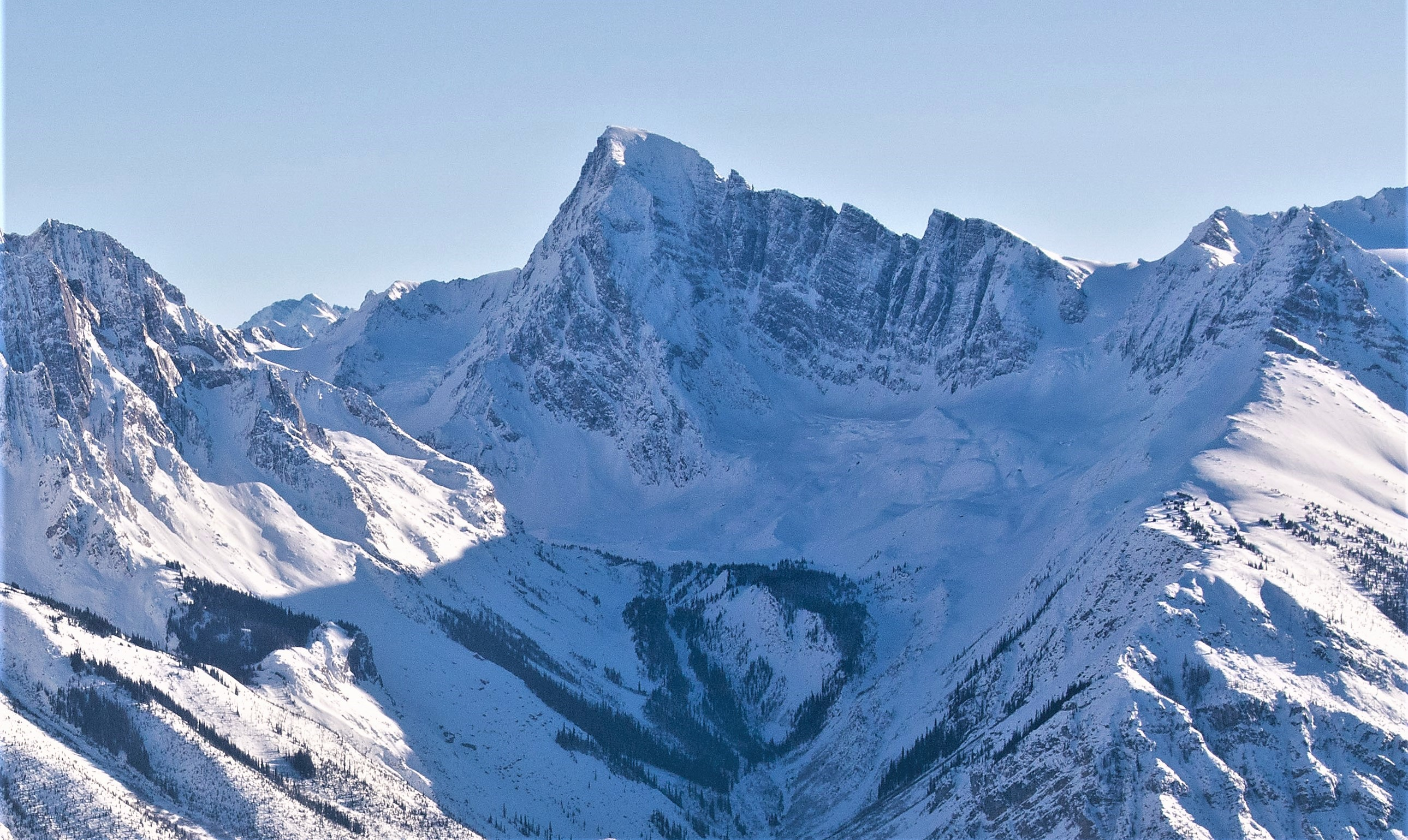
- Northwest aspect in winter

Highest point
- Elevation: 3,150 m (10,330 ft)
- Prominence: 1,509 ft (460 m)
- Parent peak: Messines Mountain
- Isolation: 1.63 mi (2.62 km)
- Listing: Mountains of British Columbia
- Coordinates: 51°48′50″N 117°00′09″W

Geography
- Location within British Columbia Location within Canada
- Interactive map of Valenciennes Mountain
- Location: Kootenay Land District; British Columbia, Canada
- Parent range: Park Ranges ← Canadian Rockies
- Topo map: NTS 82N14 Rostrum Peak

Geology
- Rock age: Cambrian
- Rock type: sedimentary rock

Climbing
- First ascent: 1934
- Easiest route: Mountaineering

Valenciennes Mountain is a 3,150-metre (10,335 ft) mountain summit located in the Canadian Rockies of British Columbia, Canada. Valenciennes Mountain is situated at the head of Valenciennes River, one kilometre west of the British Columbia-Alberta border, and the same distance outside the Banff National Park boundary. Arras Mountain is 6 km (3.7 mi) to the west, and both are in the Kootenay Land District. The peak was named in 1920 for the French town of Valenciennes, which was captured by the Allies and entered by Canadian Expeditionary Force troops on 2 November 1918 following intense fighting in World War I. The name was officially adopted in 1930 when approved by the Geographical Names Board of Canada. Canadian soldier Hugh Cairns was awarded the prestigious Victoria Cross for conspicuous bravery during the battle. The first ascent of the mountain was made in 1934 by H. S. Kingman and J. Monroe Thorington, with guide Rudolph Aemmer.

== Geology ==
Valenciennes Mountain is composed of sedimentary rock laid down during the Precambrian to Jurassic periods. Formed in shallow seas, this sedimentary rock was pushed east and over the top of younger rock during the Laramide orogeny.

== Climate ==
Based on the Köppen climate classification, Valenciennes Mountain is located in a subarctic climate zone with cold, snowy winters, and mild summers. Temperatures can drop below −20 °C with wind chill factors below −30 °C. This climate supports glaciers on the northeast and northwest slopes, as well as the Mons Icefield three kilometers to the north. Precipitation runoff drains into Mons Creek and Valenciennes River.

== Gallery ==
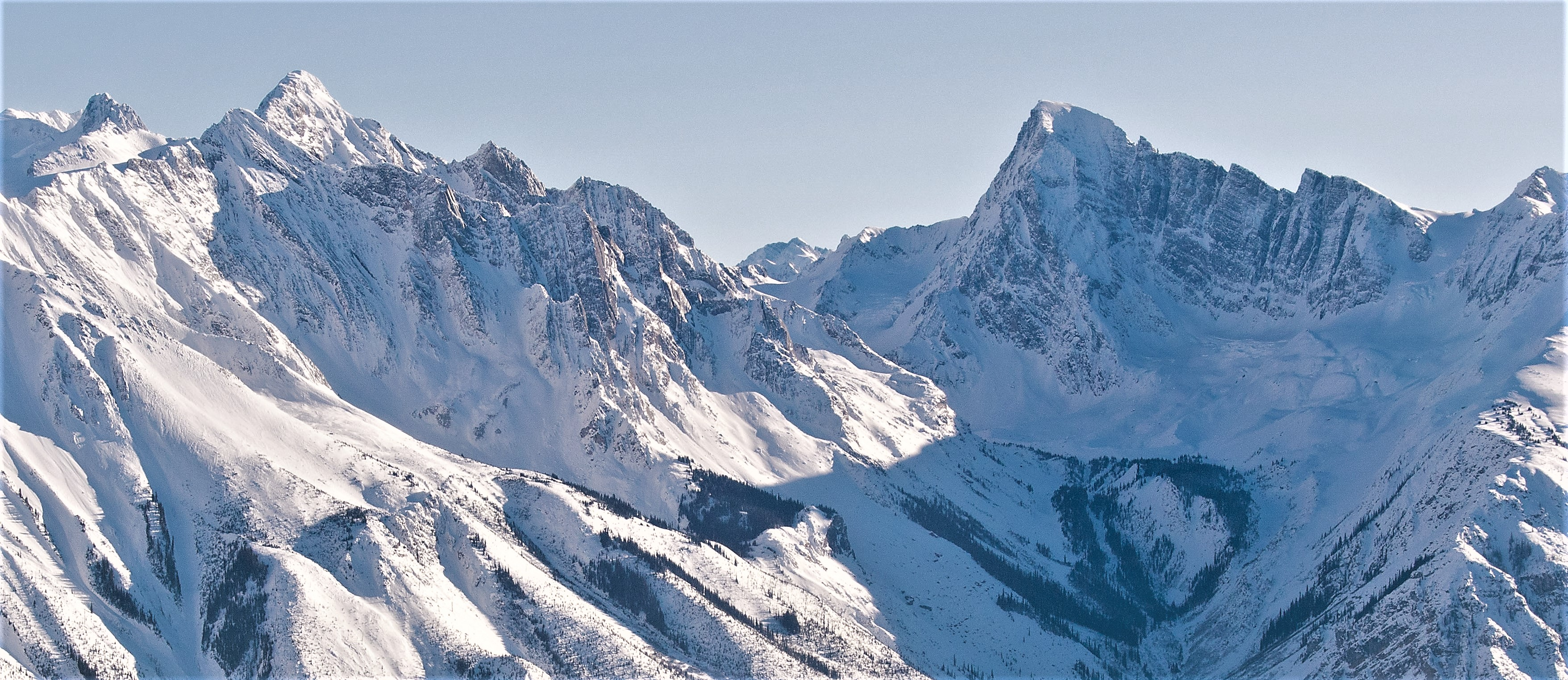
St. Julien Mountain (left) and Valenciennes Mountain (right)

== See also ==
- Geography of British Columbia
