= Ernest Peak =

Mountain in Alberta and British Columbia, Canada

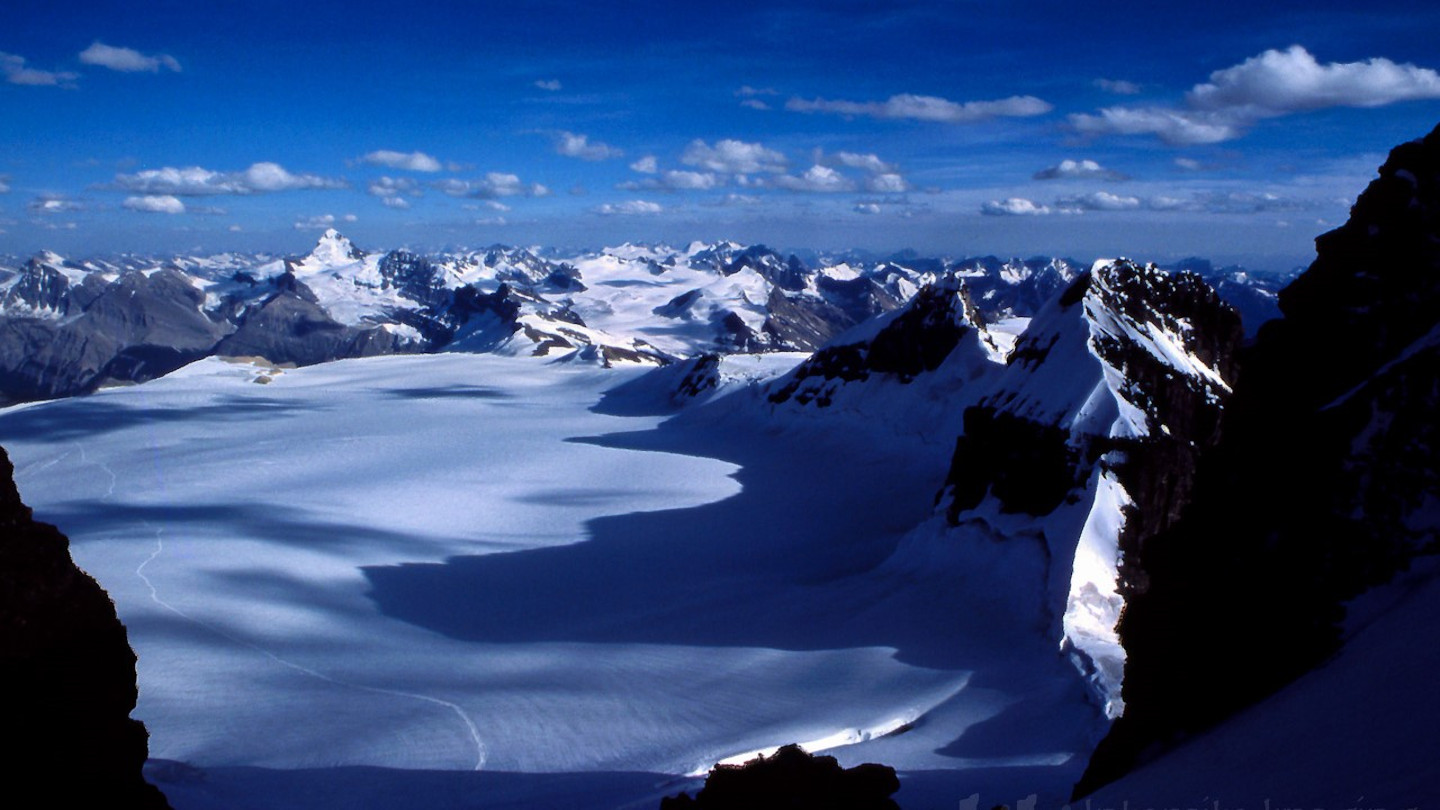
- Mt. Lyell 3 looking to Forbes, Lyell 4 & 5

Highest point
- Elevation: 3,498 m (11,476 ft)
- Prominence: 1,078 m (3,537 ft)
- Parent peak: Mount Forbes (3617 m)
- Listing: Mountains of Alberta; Mountains of British Columbia
- Coordinates: 51°57′26″N 117°06′18″W

Geography
- Location within Alberta Location within British Columbia Location within Canada
- Country: Canada
- Provinces: Alberta and British Columbia
- Protected area: Banff National Park
- Parent range: Park Ranges
- Topo map: NTS 82N14 Rostrum Peak

Climbing
- First ascent: 1926 by A.J. Ostheimer, M.M. Strumia, J.M. Thorington, E. Feuz

Ernest Peak - a.k.a. Lyell 3, L3 or Mt. Lyell (on maps, etc.) - is the central and highest peak of five distinct subpeaks on Mount Lyell (Canada) and is located on the border of Alberta and British Columbia. (There has been some dispute whether Lyell 2 or Lyell 3 is highest, but according to the recently released and corrected Climbers Guide to The Canadian Rocky Mountains - Rockies West book, the tallest is Ernest Peak). It was named in 1972 by Sydney R. Vallance after Ernest Feuz Jr.

== Geology and climate ==
Due to this peak being the central and tallest subpeak - and thus is "Mount Lyell" - see the Mount Lyell article for geology and climate.

== See also ==
- List of peaks on the British Columbia–Alberta border
