= Icefall Peak =

Mountain summit in the Canadian Rockies of British Columbia, Canada

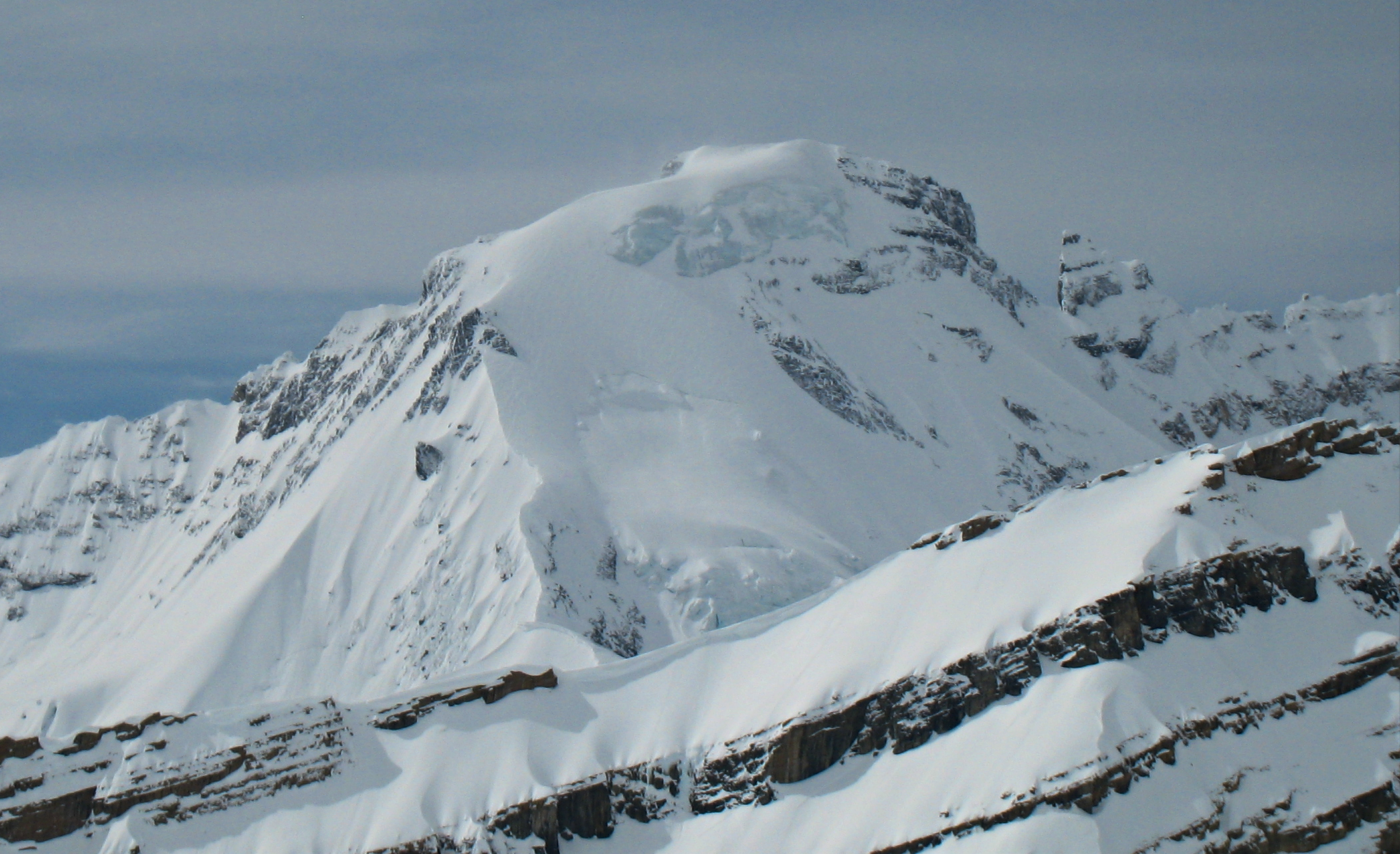
- Icefall Peak

Highest point
- Elevation: 3,195 m (10,482 ft)
- Prominence: 275 m (902 ft)
- Parent peak: Rostrum Peak (3,284 m)
- Listing: Mountains of British Columbia
- Coordinates: 51°50′51″N 117°10′52″W

Geography
- Location within British Columbia Location within Canada
- Interactive map of Icefall Peak
- Location: British Columbia, Canada
- District: Kootenay Land District
- Parent range: Park Ranges → Canadian Rockies
- Topo map: NTS 82N14 Rostrum Peak

Geology
- Rock age: Cambrian
- Rock type: sedimentary rock

Climbing
- First ascent: 1954 S.B. Hendricks, D. Hubbard, Dr. and Mrs. E.K. Karcher, A.E. Peterson
- Easiest route: Mountaineering

Icefall Peak is a 3,195-metre (10,482-foot) mountain summit located in the Canadian Rockies of British Columbia, Canada. Icefall Peak is situated on the Bush Mountain massif, and the nearest higher neighbor is Rostrum Peak, 2 km (1.2 mi) to the south-southeast. The peak was named in 1918 by the Interprovincial Boundary Survey for an icefall on its eastern flank, and was officially adopted in 1924 when approved by the Geographical Names Board of Canada. The first ascent of the mountain was made in 1954 by S.B. Hendricks, D. Hubbard, Dr. and Mrs. E.K. Karcher, and A.E. Peterson.

== Geology ==
Icefall Peak is composed of sedimentary rock laid down during the Precambrian to Jurassic periods. Formed in shallow seas, this sedimentary rock was pushed east and over the top of younger rock during the Laramide orogeny.

== Climate ==
Based on the Köppen climate classification, Icefall Peak is located in a subarctic climate zone with cold, snowy winters, and mild summers. Winter temperatures can drop below −20 °C with wind chill factors below −30 °C.

== Gallery ==
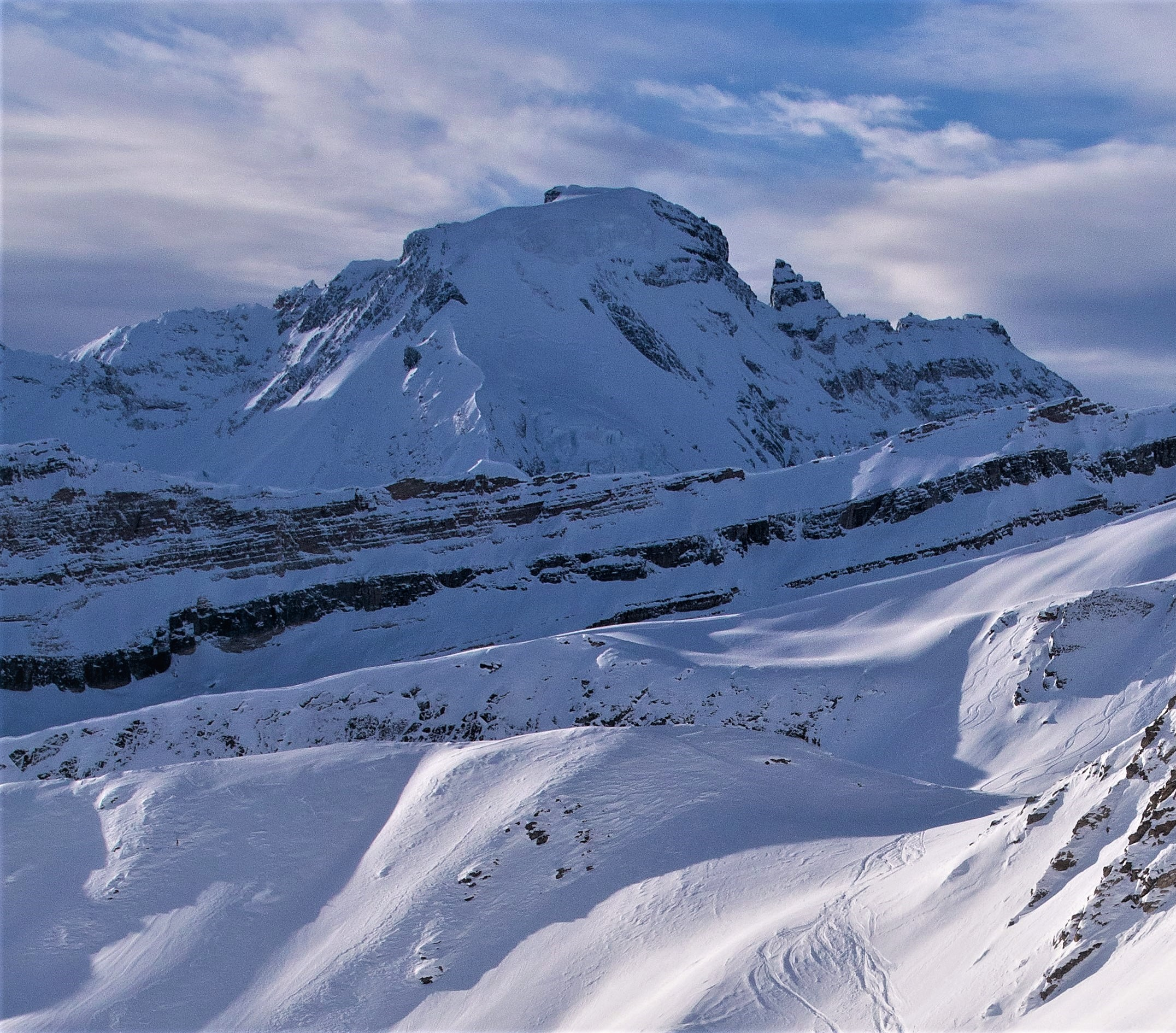
Icefall Peak in winter

== See also ==
- Geography of British Columbia
