= Valenciennes River =

Coordinates: 51°49′00″N 117°18′00″W

The Valenciennes River is a tributary of the Bush River, entering that river just above its mouth into Kinbasket Lake, the reservoir on the Columbia River created by the Mica Dam in southeastern British Columbia, Canada. The Valenciennes was originally known as the South Fork Bush River. Headwaters form on the south slope of Valenciennes Mountain. Approximately halfway through the course of the river, the Valenciennes receives Icefall Brook on the right, flowing South from Cerberus Falls.

== See also ==
- List of rivers of British Columbia
- Tributaries of the Columbia River
- Valenciennes (disambiguation)
