= Rostrum Peak =

Mountain in Canada

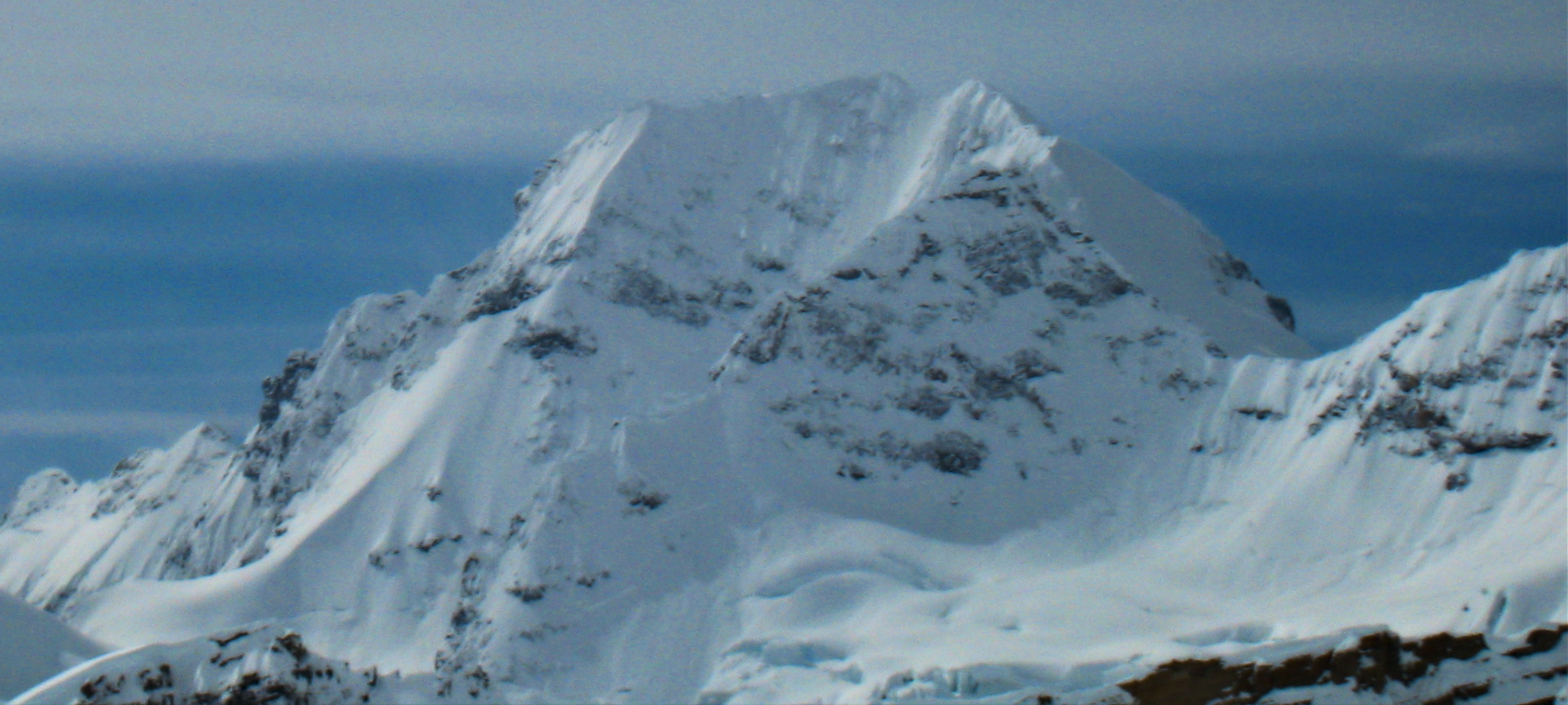
- Rostrum Peak

Highest point
- Elevation: 3,284 m (10,774 ft)
- Prominence: 704 m (2,310 ft)
- Parent peak: Christian Peak (3406 m)
- Listing: Mountains of British Columbia
- Coordinates: 51°49′54″N 117°10′26″W

Geography
- Location within British Columbia Location within Canada
- Location: British Columbia, Canada
- District: Kootenay Land District
- Parent range: Park Ranges; Canadian Rockies
- Topo map: NTS 82N14 Rostrum Peak

Geology
- Rock age: Cambrian
- Rock type: Sedimentary rock

Climbing
- First ascent: 1936 W.N.M. Hogg, Christian Hasler Jr
- Easiest route: Mountaineering

Rostrum Peak is a 3,284-metre (10,774-foot) mountain summit located in the Canadian Rockies of British Columbia, Canada. Rostrum is the highest summit of the Bush Mountain massif. Its nearest higher peak is Christian Peak, 13.5 km (8.4 mi) to the north-northeast. Icefall Peak lies 2 km (1.2 mi) to the north-northwest. The peak was named in 1918 for its resemblance to a rostrum, and was officially adopted in 1924 when approved by the Geographical Names Board of Canada. The first ascent of the mountain was made in 1936 by W.N.M. Hogg with guide Christian Hasler Jr.

== Geology ==
Rostrum Peak is composed of sedimentary rock laid down during the Precambrian to Jurassic periods. Formed in shallow seas, this sedimentary rock was pushed east and over the top of younger rock during the Laramide orogeny.

== Climate ==
Based on the Köppen climate classification, Rostrum Peak is located in a subarctic climate zone with cold, snowy winters, and mild summers. Temperatures can drop below −20 °C with wind chill factors below −30 °C. Precipitation runoff from the peak drains into tributaries of the Valenciennes River.

== See also ==
- List of mountains in the Canadian Rockies
- Geography of British Columbia
