= Red Mountain =

Red Mountain may refer to:

== Places ==
=== Turkmenistan ===
- Red Mountain (Gyzylgaya), the village located in Turkmenistan in Balkan region, there are huge area covered by red mountains

=== Canada ===
- Red Mountain (British Columbia), the highest summit in the Camelsfoot Range in British Columbia
- Red Mountain (Rossland), a mountain near Rossland, British Columbia
  - Red Mountain Resort, a ski resort on Red Mountain in Rossland, also known as Red Resort
- Mount Price (British Columbia), a volcano in British Columbia formerly known as Red Mountain
- Fissile Peak, a mountain in British Columbia formerly known as Red Mountain
- Red Mountain Creek, a tributary of Ashlu Creek in British Columbia

=== China ===
- Hong Shan, a symbolic inner city mountain in Ürümqi, Xinjiang
- Kizilto (meaning 'red mountain'), Akto County, Kizilsu Kyrgyz Autonomous Region, Xinjiang

=== Czech Republic ===
- see Červená hora (disambiguation)

=== United States ===
- Red Mountain (Birmingham), Jefferson County, Alabama
- Red Mountain (Coconino County, Arizona), located in the Coconino National Forest of northern Arizona
- Mount McDowell, located in Maricopa County, Arizona
- Red Mountain Freeway, a part of Loop 202 in Metropolitan Phoenix, Arizona, named for the mountain
- Red Mountain, California, an unincorporated community in San Bernardino County
- Red Mountain (Santa Clara County, California), a mountain in the Diablo Range
- Red Mountain (Costilla County, Colorado), a mountain in the Culebra Range of southern Colorado
- Red Mountain (El Paso County, Colorado), by Manitou Springs, Colorado
- Red Mountain (Grand County, Colorado), a mount in the Never Summer Mountains of Rocky Mountain National Park in Colorado
- Red Mountain (Gunnison County, Colorado), a mountain in Colorado's West Elk Mountains
- Red Mountain (Ouray County, Colorado), a mount in the San Juan Mountains of Colorado
  - Red Mountain Pass (San Juan Mountains), a mountain pass in Colorado associated with the mountain
- Red Mountain (Fergus County, Montana), a mountain in Fergus County, Montana
- Red Mountain (Gallatin County, Montana), a mountain in Gallatin County, Montana
- Red Mountain (Glacier County, Montana)
- Red Mountain (Lewis and Clark County, Montana), a mountain in Lewis and Clark County, Montana
- Red Mountain (Sweet Grass County, Montana), a mountain in Sweet Grass County, Montana
- Red Mountain (Nevada), see Nellis Air Force Base Complex
- Red Mountain (New York), an elevation
- Red Mountain (Oregon), a summit of the Wallowa Mountains
- Red Mountain (Benton County, Washington)
- Red Mountain (King County, Washington), in King County north of Snoqualmie Pass
- Red Mountain (Kittitas County, Washington), Washington
- Red Mountain (Skagit County, Washington), in North Cascades National Park
  - Red Mountain AVA, a wine region in Washington named for the mountain
- Red Mountain (Wyoming), located in the northern Teton Range

== Other uses ==
- Red Mountain (band), an American string band taking its name from Red Mountain (Birmingham, Alabama)
- Red Mountain (film), a 1951 Western starring Alan Ladd
- Red Mountain, a place in the video game The Elder Scrolls III: Morrowind
- Red Mountain, a zone in the video game Sonic Adventure
- Red Mountain, later Carlo Rossi Red Mountain, a one-gallon jug of cheap wine, from Gallo (winery)#Red Mountain
- 红山 (disambiguation)
