= Granite Mountain (British Columbia) =

Mountain of British Columbia, Canada

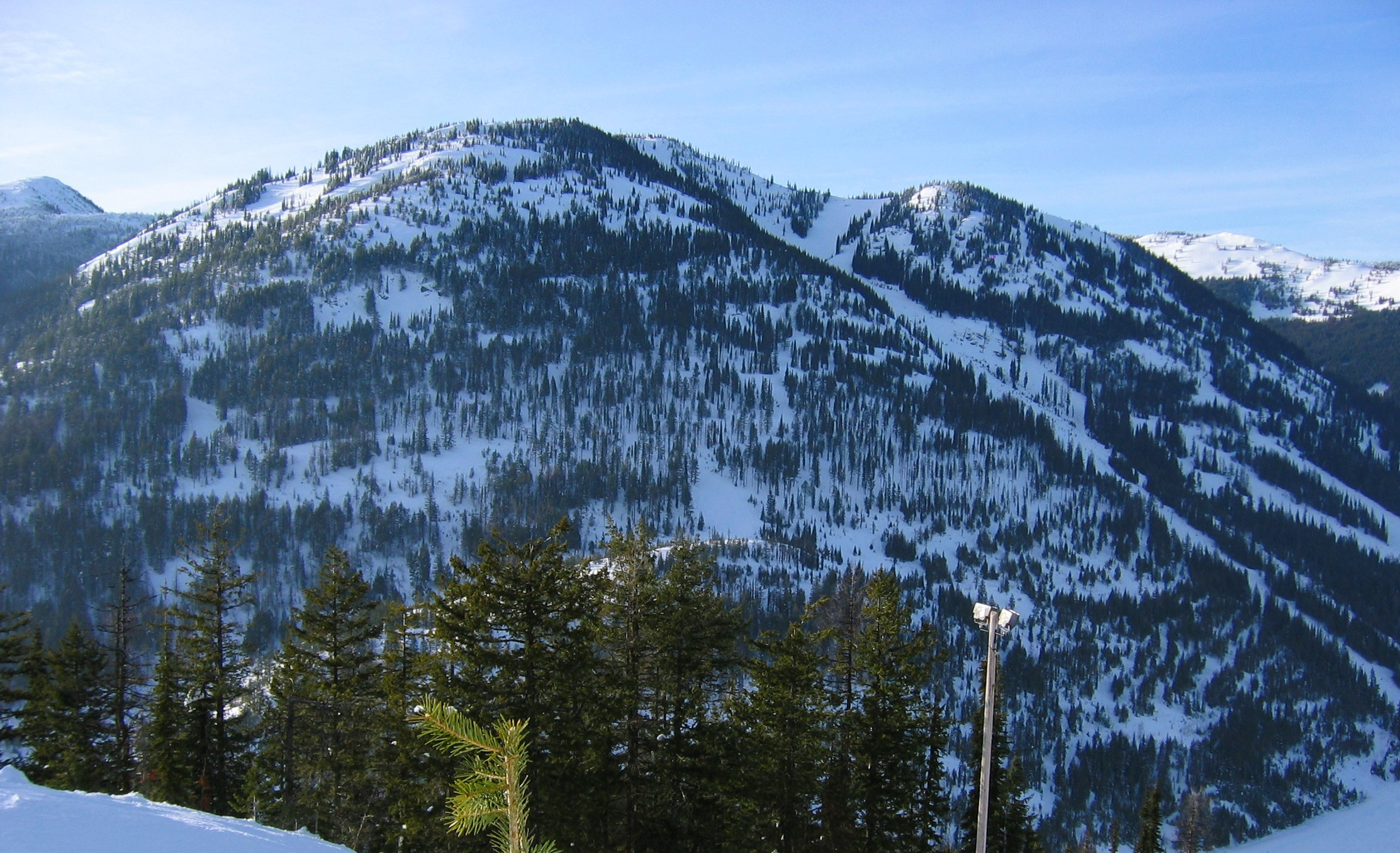
- Southeast aspect, viewed from Red Mountain

Highest point
- Elevation: 2,036 m (6,680 ft)
- Prominence: 134 m (440 ft)
- Parent peak: Record Mountain
- Isolation: 1.79 km (1.11 mi)
- Coordinates: 49°06′08″N 117°51′20″W

Geography
- Location within British Columbia Location within Canada
- Country: Canada
- Province: British Columbia
- District: Kootenay Land District
- Parent range: Rossland Range
- Topo map: NTS 82F4 Trail

Granite Mountain, 2036 m (6680 ft) prominence: 134 m, is a mountain in the Rossland Range of the Monashee Mountains in the West Kootenay region of southeastern British Columbia, Canada. It is located just northwest of the city of Rossland and is the second highest of the three mountains forming the core of the Red Mountain Ski Resort, the others being Grey Mountain and the eponymous Red Mountain.

== See also ==
- Granite Mountain (disambiguation)
