= Mount Roberts (Rossland Range) =

Mountain in British Columbia, Canada

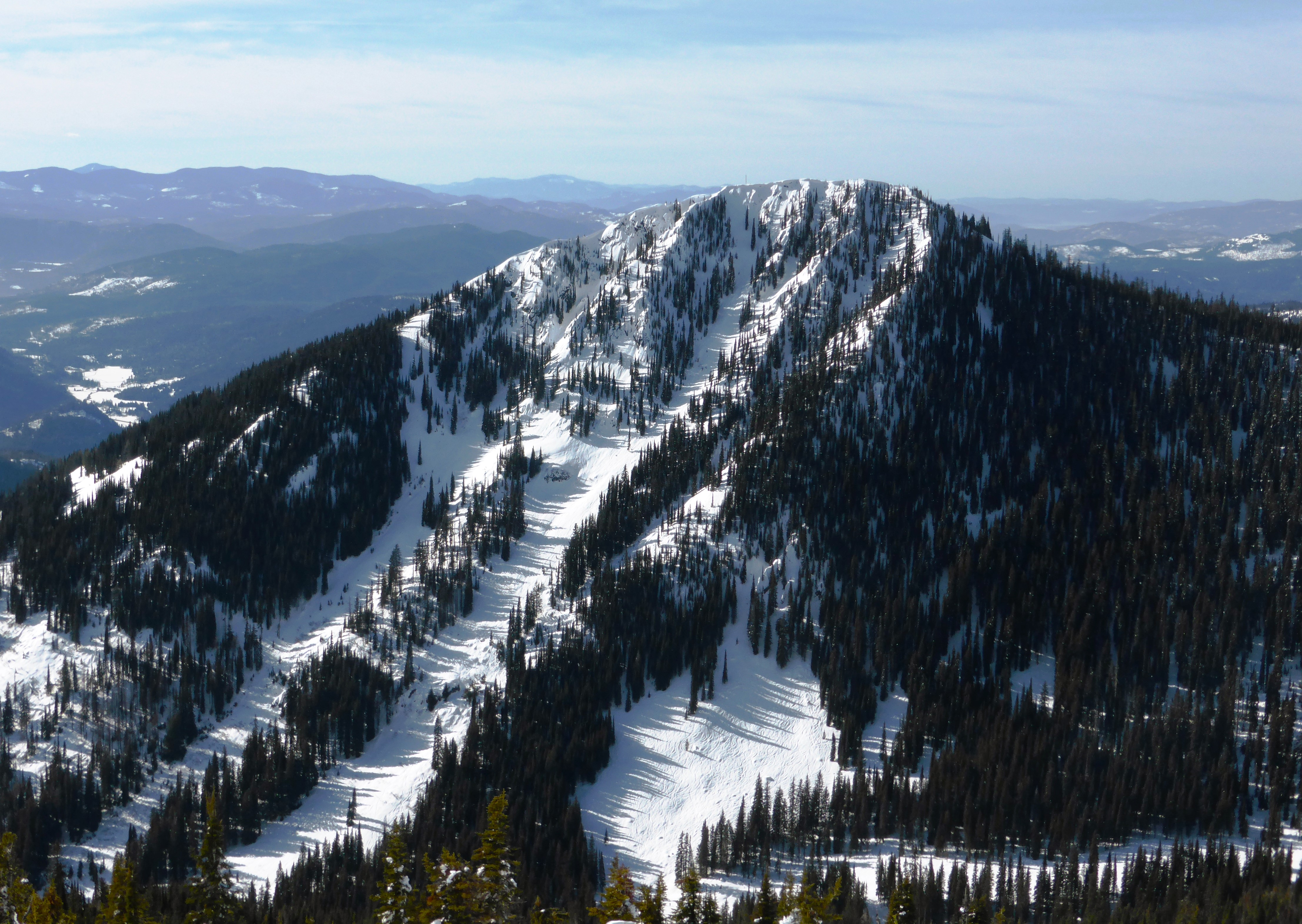
- North aspect in winter

Highest point
- Elevation: 1,991 m (6,532 ft)
- Prominence: 182 m (597 ft)
- Parent peak: Record Mountain
- Isolation: 1.68 km (1.04 mi)
- Listing: Mountains of British Columbia
- Coordinates: 49°05′15″N 117°51′37″W

Naming
- Etymology: Frederick Roberts, 1st Earl Roberts

Geography
- Location within British Columbia Location within Canada
- Interactive map of Mount Roberts
- Country: Canada
- Province: British Columbia
- District: Kootenay Land District
- Parent range: Rossland Range
- Topo map: NTS 82F4 Trail

Climbing
- Easiest route: Mt. Roberts Trail

Mount Roberts is a 1,991-metre (6,532-foot) mountain summit in British Columbia, Canada.

== Description ==
Mount Roberts is part of the Rossland Range which is a subrange of the Monashee Mountains. The peak is located four kilometres (2.5 mi) west-northwest of the community of Rossland and three kilometres (1.9 mi) southwest of the Red Mountain Ski Resort. Precipitation runoff from the peak drains into tributaries of the Columbia River. Topographic relief is significant as the summit rises nearly 1,000 metres (3,280 ft) above Little Sheep Creek in two kilometres (1.2 mi). An ascent of the summit involves hiking 7.64 kilometres (4.75 miles) and 895 metres (2,936 feet) of elevation gain, with the months of June through October offering the best time for visiting. It is an annual Canada Day tradition for residents of Rossland to raise the Canadian flag on the flagpole on the summit on July 1.

== Etymology ==
The mountain's toponym was officially adopted on June 2, 1950, by the Geographical Names Board of Canada. However, the name was published as early as 1901, if not earlier, as the townspeople of Rossland named the mountain for Lord Roberts (1832–1914). As head of the British Forces which entered Pretoria on June 5, 1900, Lord Roberts' stirred the Rossland residents to honor his victory of the Second Boer War. They also erected a flagpole at the summit in 1900 to fly the British flag in honor of Lord Roberts.

== Climate ==
Based on the Köppen climate classification, Mount Roberts is located in a subarctic climate zone with cold, snowy winters, and warm summers. Winter temperatures can drop below −10 °C with wind chill factors below −20 °C. The peak receives precipitation all year, as snow in winter and as thunderstorms in summer.

== Gallery ==
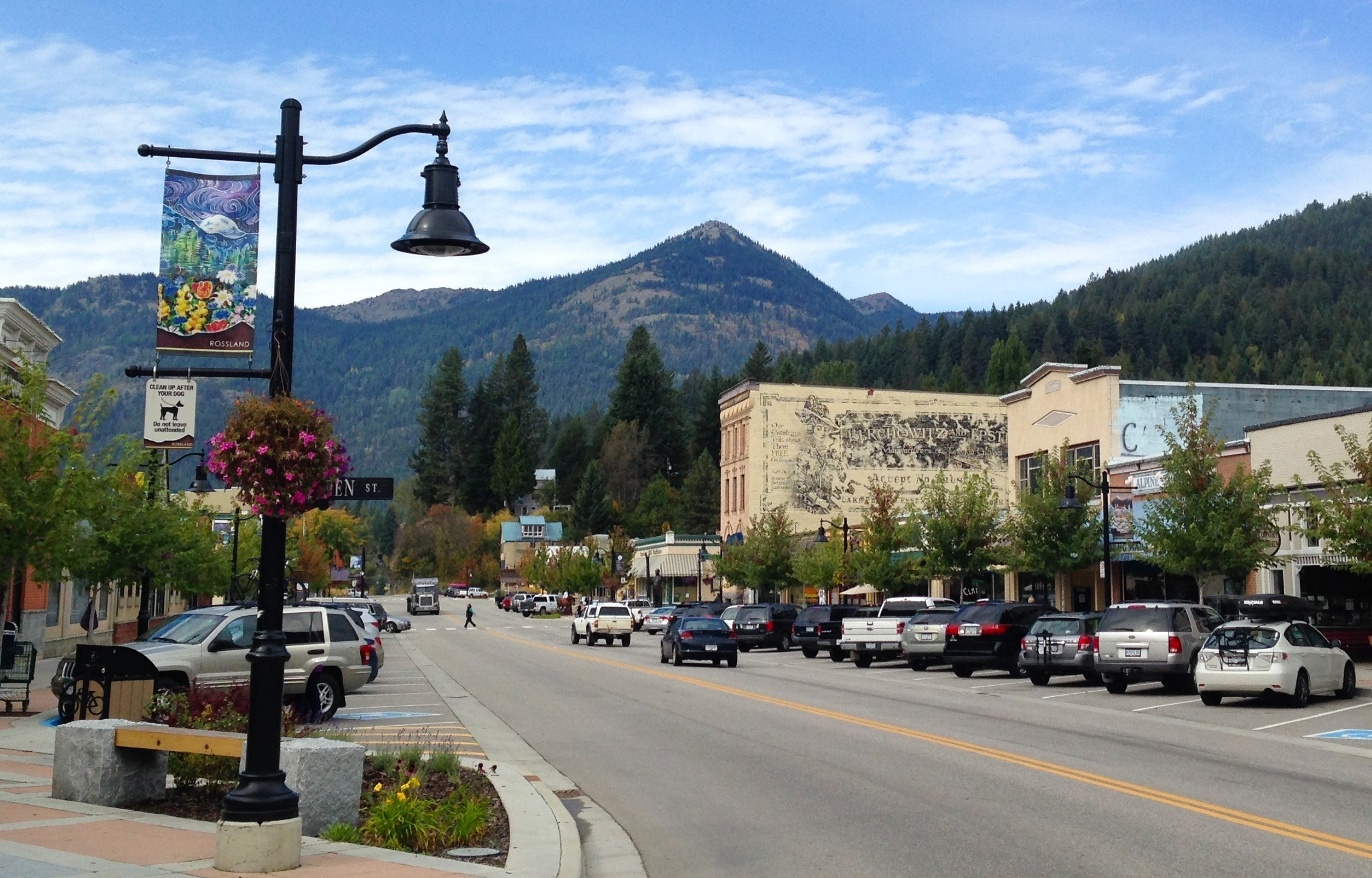
Rossland, with Mount Roberts centered on skyline

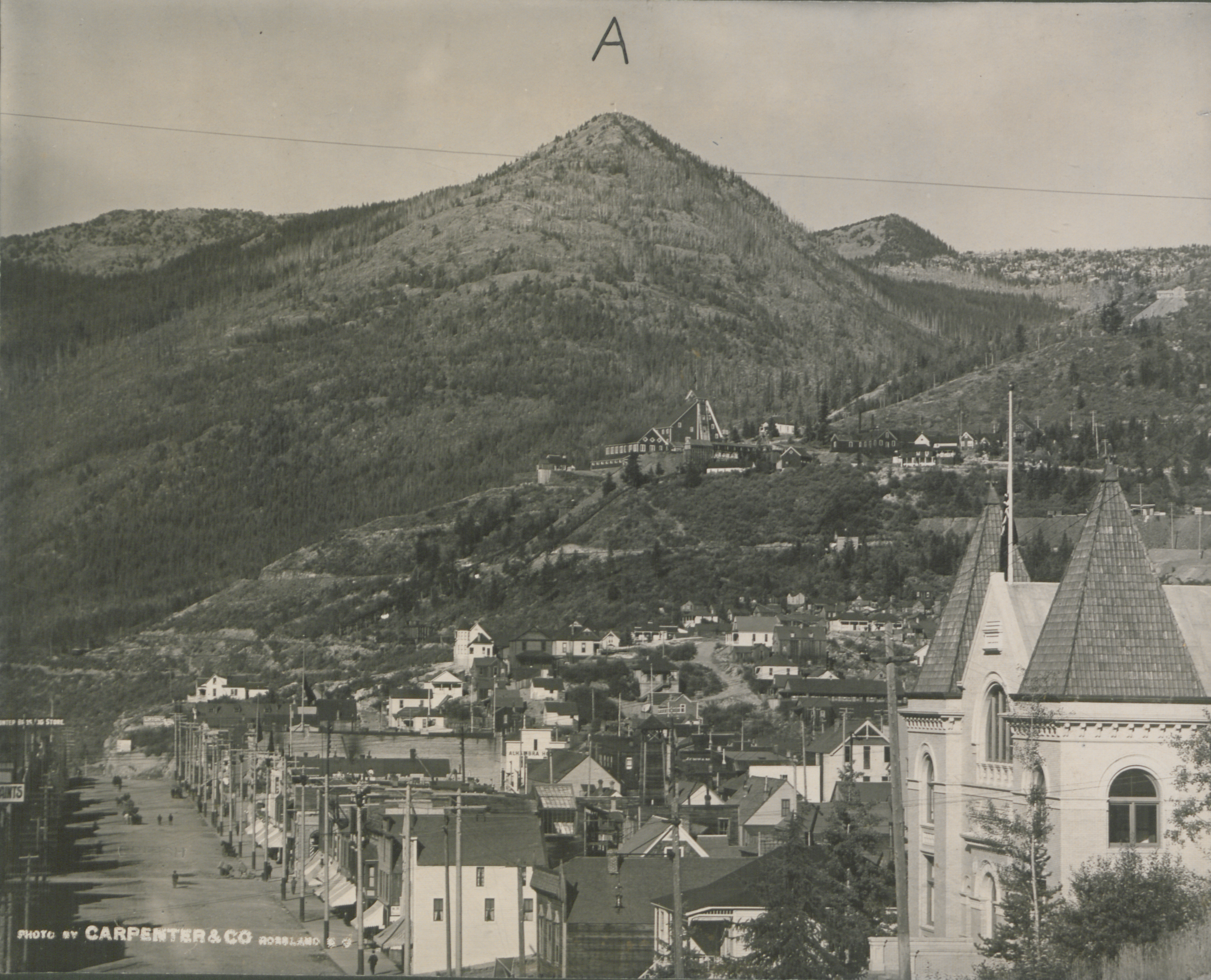
Mount Roberts from Rossland in 1901

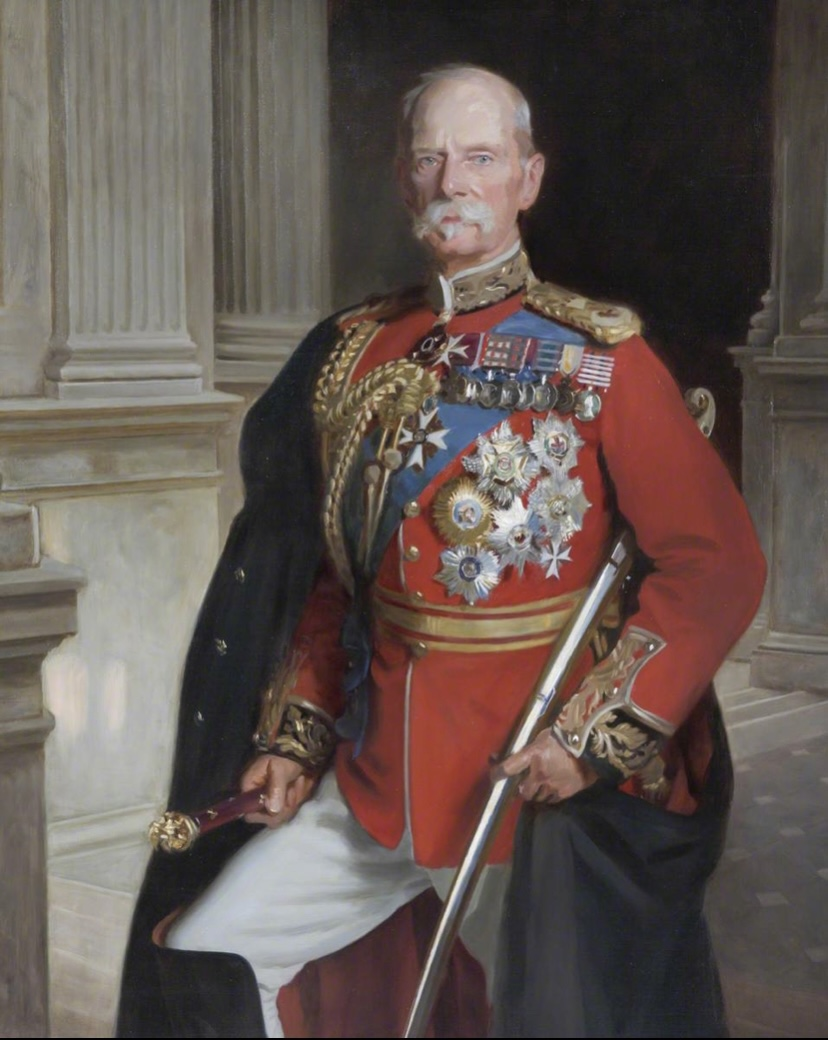
Lord Roberts

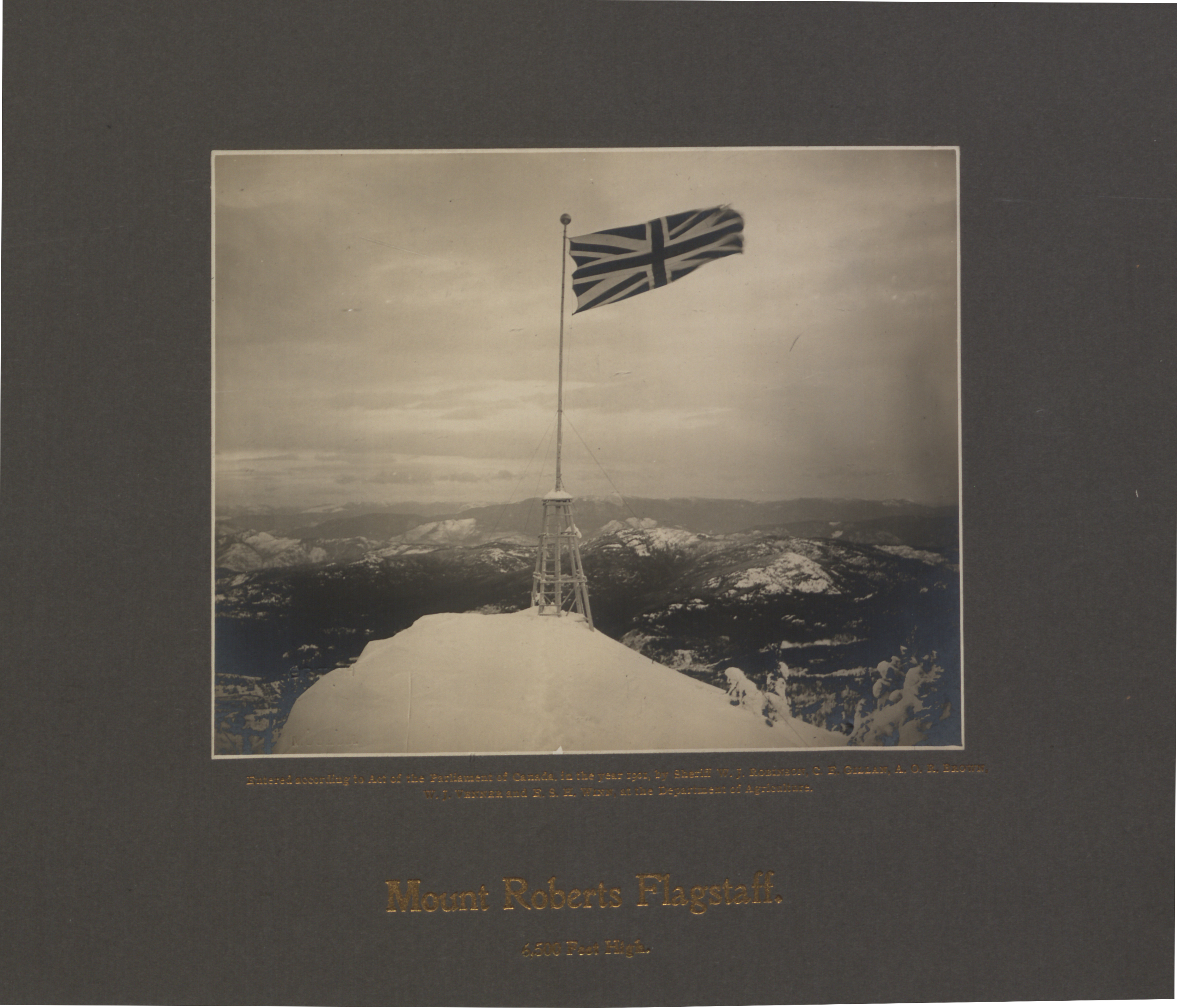
British flag on Mt. Roberts in 1901

== See also ==
- Geography of British Columbia
- Geology of British Columbia
