= Record Mountain =

Summit in British Columbia, Canada

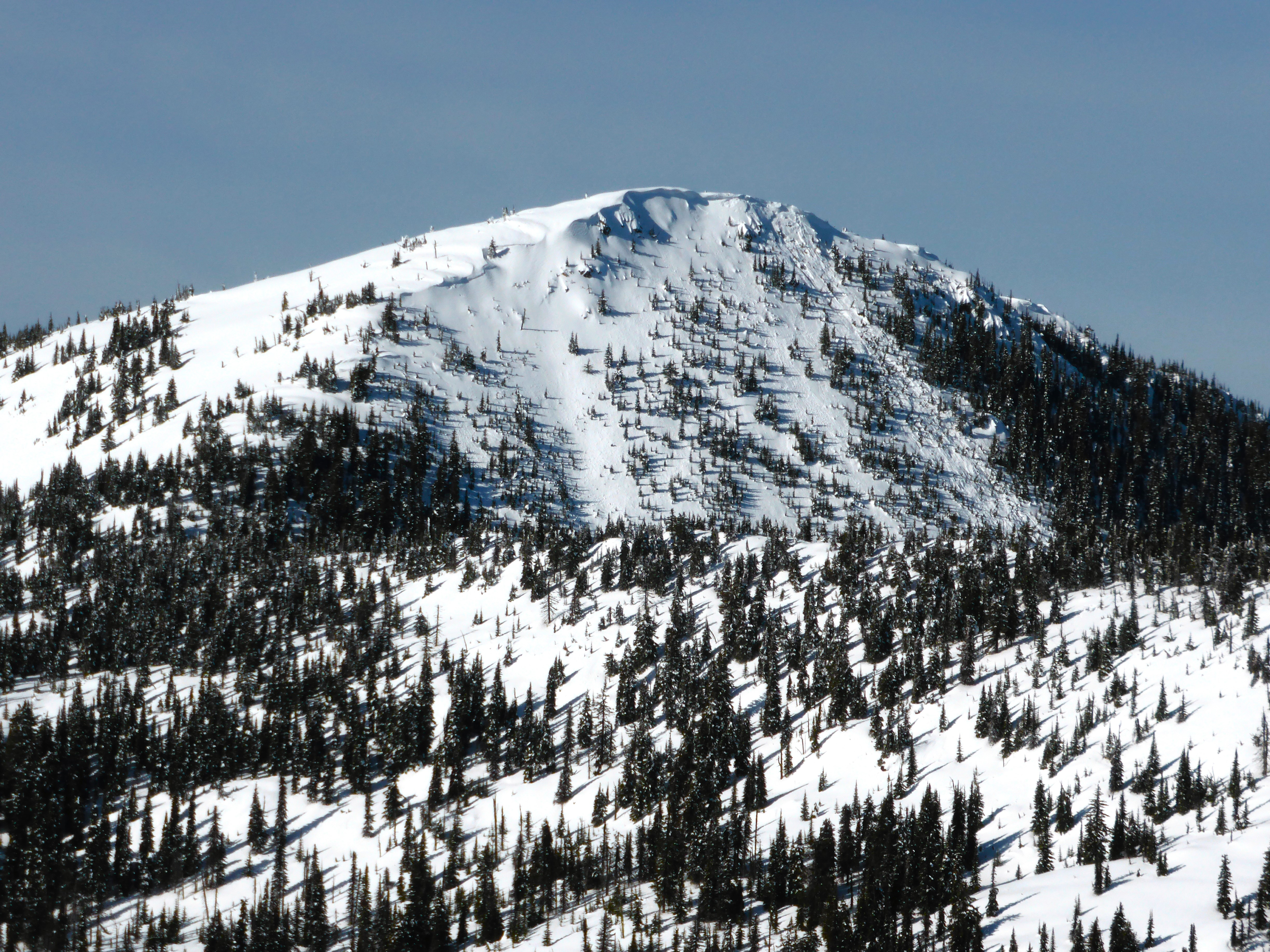
- East aspect in winter

Highest point
- Elevation: 2,113 m (6,932 ft)
- Prominence: 309 m (1,014 ft)
- Parent peak: Old Glory Mountain
- Isolation: 6.24 km (3.88 mi)
- Listing: Mountains of British Columbia
- Coordinates: 49°05′50″N 117°52′56″W

Geography
- Location within British Columbia Location within Canada
- Interactive map of Record Mountain
- Country: Canada
- Province: British Columbia
- District: Kootenay Land District
- Protected area: Rossland Range Recreation Site
- Parent range: Rossland Range
- Topo map: NTS 82F4 Trail

Geology
- Rock type: Volcanic rock

Record Mountain is a 2,113-metre (6,932-foot) summit in British Columbia, Canada.

== Description ==
Record Mountain is the seventh-highest peak in the Rossland Range which is a subrange of the Monashee Mountains. The peak is located six kilometres (3.7 mi) west-northwest of the community of Rossland and three kilometres (1.9 mi) west of the Red Mountain Ski Resort. Precipitation runoff from the peak drains into tributaries of the Columbia River. Topographic relief is modest as the summit rises over 1,400 metres (4,593 ft) above Big Sheep Creek in 4.5 kilometres (2.8 mi). The mountain's toponym was officially adopted on June 2, 1950, by the Geographical Names Board of Canada, although the name's origin/significance is not known. However, the name was published as early as 1901, if not earlier. One possible clue, Rossland's first newspaper, The Record also known as Rossland Record, was established in February 1895 by Eber C. Smith.

== Climate ==
Based on the Köppen climate classification, Record Mountain is located in a subarctic climate zone with cold, snowy winters, and warm summers. Winter temperatures can drop below −10 °C with wind chill factors below −20 °C. The peak receives precipitation all year, as snow in winter and as thunderstorms in summer.

== See also ==
- Geography of British Columbia
- Geology of British Columbia
