= Del Puerto Canyon =

Valley in Stanislaus County, California, US

Del Puerto Canyon is the valley or canyon of Del Puerto Creek in Stanislaus County, California. The canyon mouth is at an elevation of 223 feet (68 meters). Its head is located at 37°23′51″N 121°27′26″W and is at an elevation of 2,800 feet (850 meters) on the south slope of Red Mountain.
