= Mount Roberts =

Mount Roberts may refer to:

- Mount Roberts (Alaska) near Juneau, Alaska, USA
- Mount Roberts (Nunivak Island), Alaska, USA
- Mount Roberts (Antarctica)
- Mount Roberts (New Hampshire) in New Hampshire, USA
- Mount Roberts (Prince of Wales Range) on Vancouver Island, British Columbia, Canada
- Mount Roberts (Queensland) in the Great Dividing Range, Queensland, Australia
- Mount Roberts (Rossland Range) in the interior of British Columbia, Canada
- Roberts Mountain, (a.k.a. Mount Roberts), Wyoming, USA

See also: Roberts Mountains and Roberts Peak
