= Old Glory Mountain =

Mountain in British Columbia, Canada

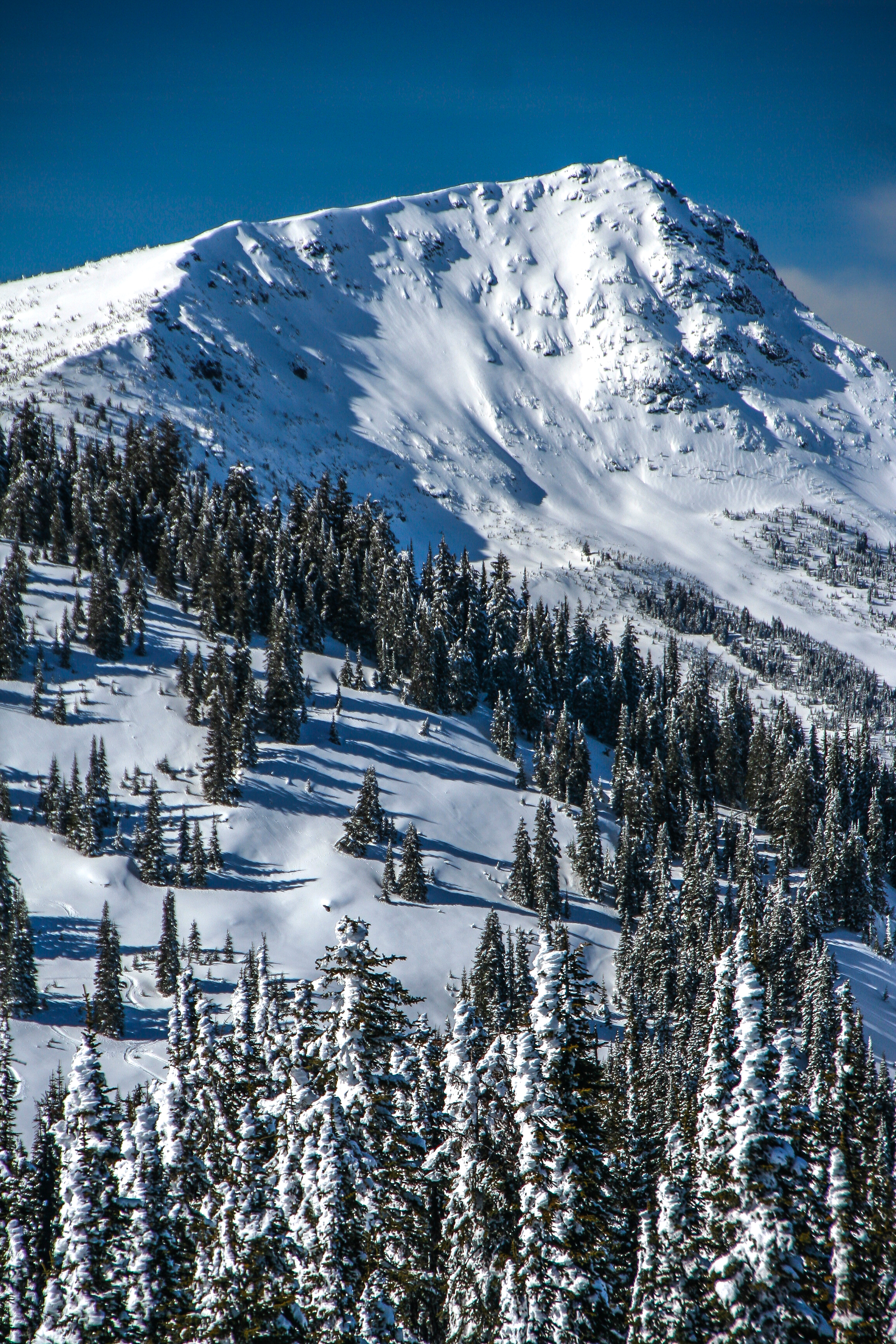
- South aspect in winter

Highest point
- Elevation: 2,376 m (7,795 ft)
- Prominence: 1,174 m (3,852 ft)
- Parent peak: Pinnacle Peak
- Isolation: 38.88 km (24.16 mi)
- Listing: Mountains of British Columbia
- Coordinates: 49°08′59″N 117°54′44″W

Naming
- Etymology: Old Glory

Geography
- Location within British Columbia Location within Canada
- Country: Canada
- Province: British Columbia
- District: Kootenay Land District
- Protected area: Rossland Range Recreation Site
- Parent range: Rossland Range
- Topo map: NTS 82F4 Trail

Climbing
- Easiest route: Trail

Old Glory Mountain is a 2,376-metre (7,795-foot) summit in British Columbia, Canada.

== Description ==
Old Glory Mountain is the highest peak in the Rossland Range which is a subrange of the Monashee Mountains. The peak is located 11 km (6.8 mi) northwest of the community of Rossland and five kilometres (3.1 mi) northwest of Red Mountain Ski Resort. Precipitation runoff from the peak drains to Big Sheep Creek which is a tributary of the Columbia River. Topographic relief is significant as the summit rises over 1,600 metres (5,250 ft) above the creek in five kilometres (3.1 mi). An ascent of the summit involves hiking 9.4 kilometres (5.8 miles) and 974 metres (3,195 feet) of elevation gain, with the months of July through October offering the best time for visiting the popular destination. There is an old fire lookout at the summit. The mountain's toponym, presumably a reference to the USA flag, was officially adopted on June 2, 1950, by the Geographical Names Board of Canada. However, the name was published as early as 1901, if not earlier.

== Climate ==
Based on the Köppen climate classification, Old Glory Mountain is located in a subarctic climate zone with cold, snowy winters, and warm summers. Winter temperatures can drop below −10 °C with wind chill factors below −20 °C. The peak receives precipitation all year, as snow in winter and as thunderstorms in summer.

== Gallery ==
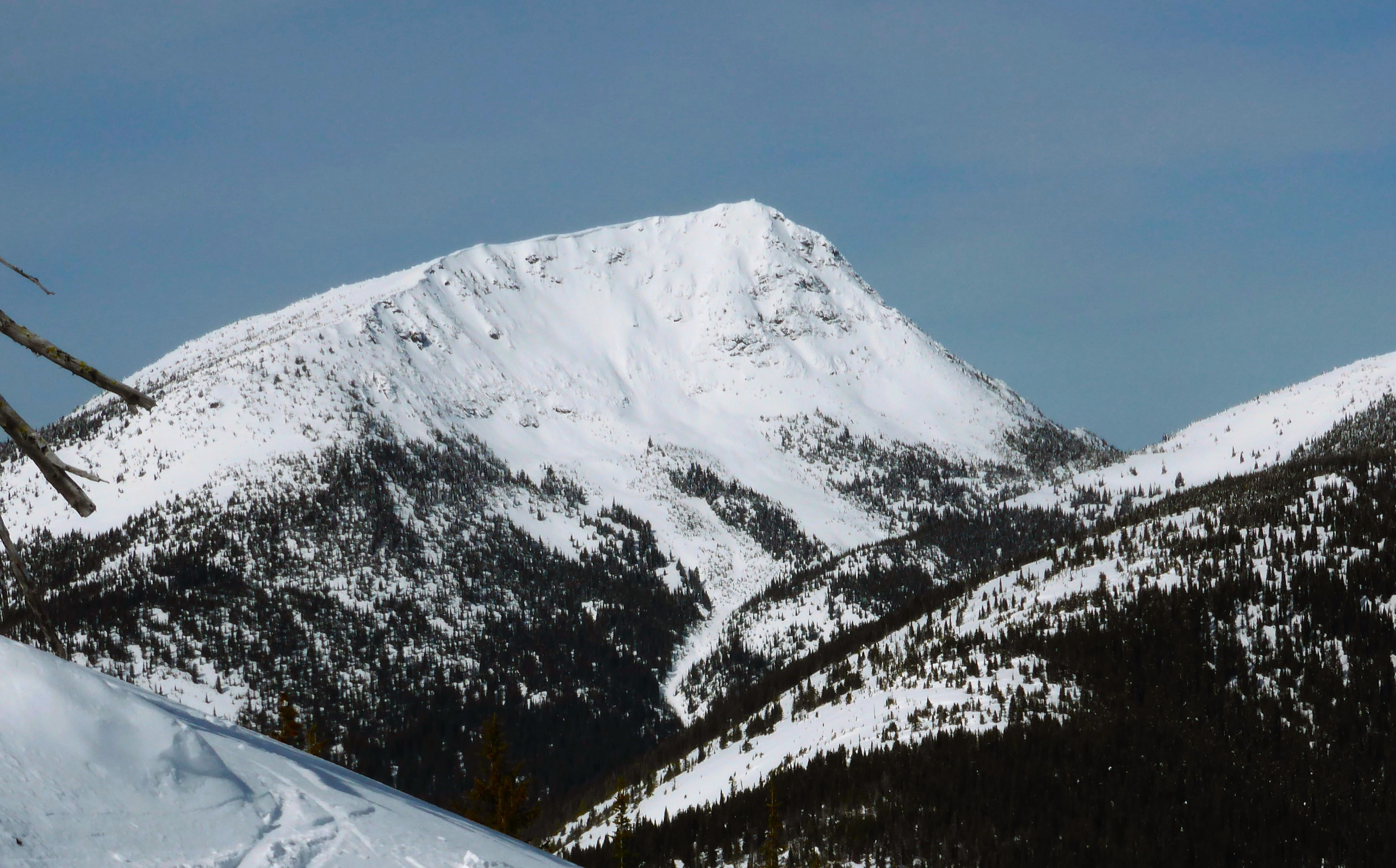
Southeast aspect

== See also ==
- Geography of British Columbia
- Geology of British Columbia
