= 红山 =

红山 may refer to:

- Hong Shan (Hanyu Pinyin: Hóng Shān; lit. 'Red Mountain'), an inner city mountain in Ürümqi, Xinjiang Uyghur Autonomous Region, China
- Bukit Merah, a hill in Singapore
- Taman Perdana, a location in the center of Batu Pahat Town, Johor, Malaysia
- Kizilto, Akto County, Kizilsu Kyrgyz Autonomous Prefecture, Xinjiang, China

== See also ==
- Red Mountain (disambiguation)
