= Červená hora =

Červená hora may refer to places in the Czech Republic:

- Červená Hora, a municipality and village in the Hradec Králové Region
- Červená hora (Hrubý Jeseník), a mountain in the Olomouc Region
- Červená hora (Nízký Jeseník), a mountain in the Moravian-Silesian Region
