= Red Mountain (Gunnison County, Colorado) =

Mountain in the state of Colorado

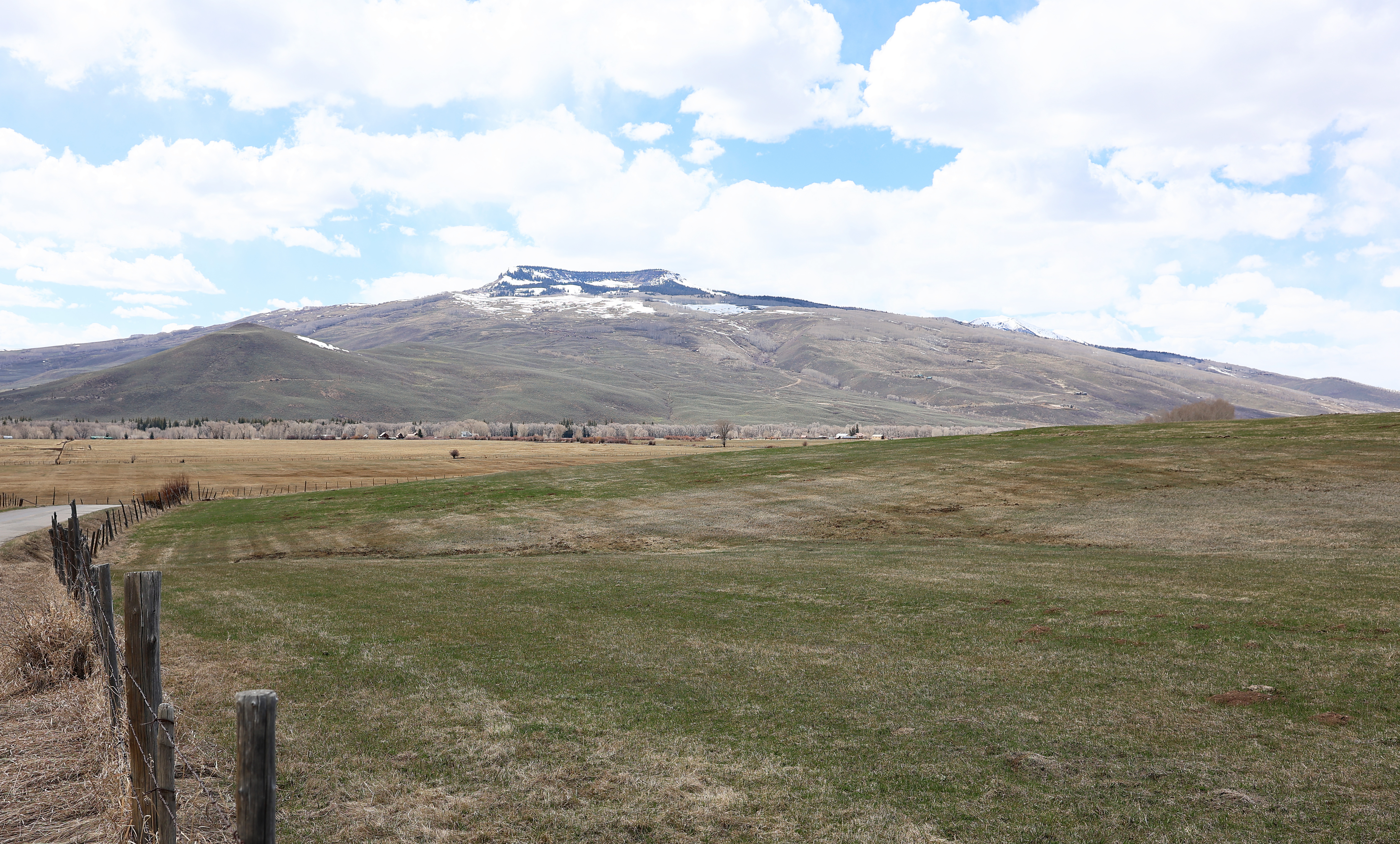
- The mountain in 2025 viewed from Jack's Cabin Cutoff, north of Almont

Highest point
- Elevation: 11,679 ft (3,560 m)
- Prominence: 1,120 ft (340 m)
- Isolation: 4.48 mi (7.21 km)
- Coordinates: 38°45′52.76″N 106°56′25.01″W

Geography
- Location within Colorado
- Location: Gunnison County, Colorado, U.S.
- Parent range: West Elk Mountains
- Topo map(s): USGS 7.5' topographic map Crested Butte

Red Mountain, elevation 11,679 feet (3,560 meters), is a summit in the West Elk Mountains north of Gunnison in Gunnison County, Colorado, U.S. The peak is within the Gunnison National Forest.

== Geology ==
The top of the mountain is covered with a basaltic lava flow laid down during the Miocene.

== Historical names ==
An earlier name for the mountain was Mount Wilkinson.
