= Red Mountain (Costilla County, Colorado) =

Mountain in Colorado, United States

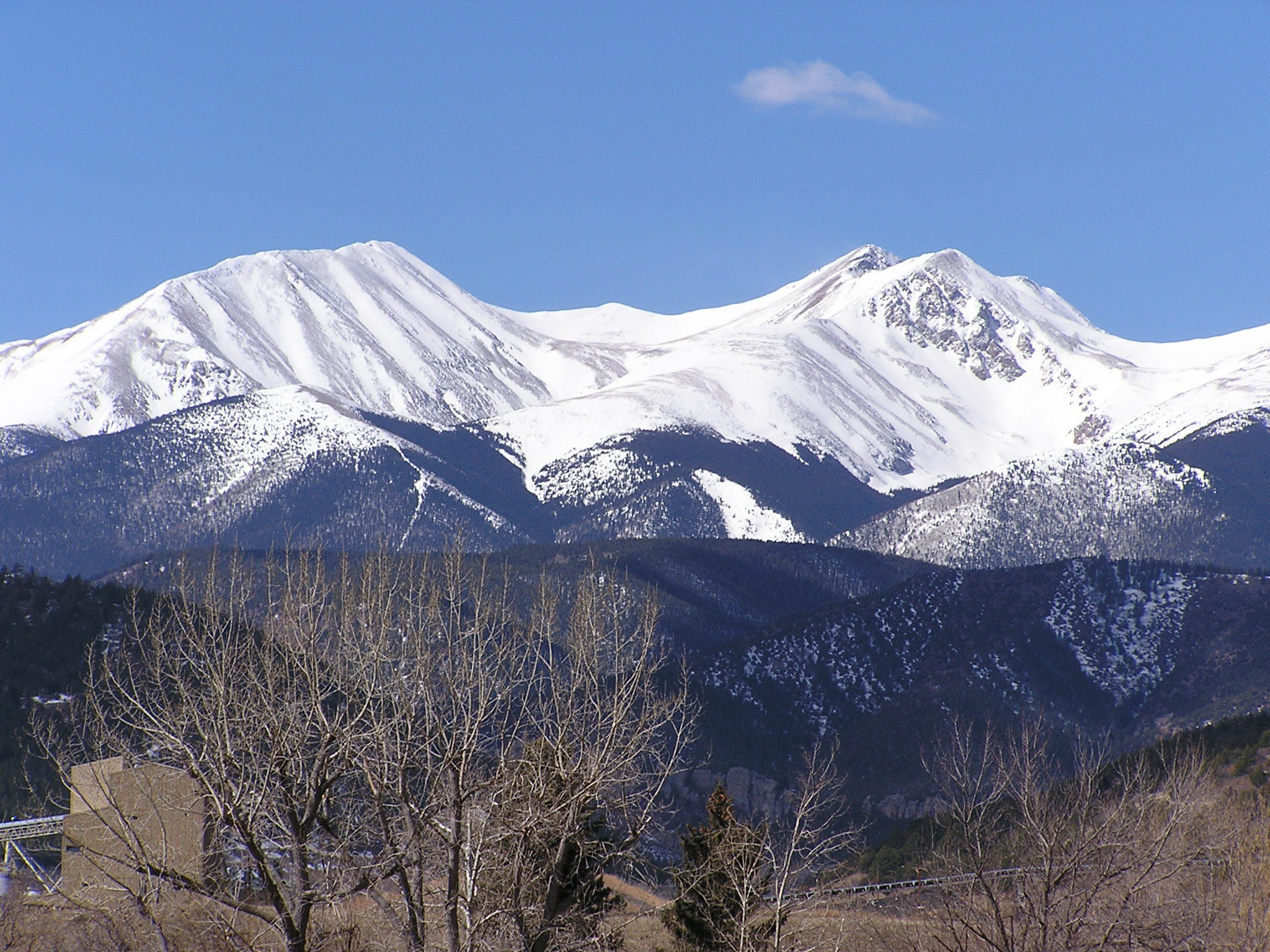
- Red Mountain (left) and Culebra Peak (right)

Highest point
- Elevation: 13,914 ft (4,241 m)
- Prominence: 448 ft (137 m)
- Isolation: 0.74 mi (1.19 km)
- Coordinates: 37°06′44″N 105°10′52″W

Geography
- Location within Colorado
- Location: Costilla County, Colorado, U.S.
- Parent range: Culebra Range
- Topo map(s): USGS 7.5' topographic map Culebra Peak, Colorado

Climbing
- Easiest route: hike

Red Mountain, elevation 13,914 ft (4,241 m), is a summit in the Culebra Range of south central Colorado. The peak is on private land 15 mi (24 km) southeast of San Luis.

== Historical names ==
- Espinazo Rojo – 1972
- Red Mountain – 1972

== See also ==
- List of Colorado mountain ranges
- List of Colorado mountain summits
  - List of Colorado fourteeners
  - List of Colorado 4000 meter prominent summits
  - List of the most prominent summits of Colorado
- List of Colorado county high points
