= Red Mountain (Kittitas County, Washington) =

Mountain in Washington (state), United States

- Location within Washington (state)

Highest point
- Elevation: 5,880+ ft (1,790+ m)
- Prominence: 2,560 ft (780 m)
- Parent peak: Three Queens
- Coordinates: 47°23′51″N 121°08′41″W

Geography
- Location: Okanogan-Wenatchee National Forest; Kittitas County, Washington, U.S.
- Parent range: Cascades
- Topo map: USGS Polallie Ridge

Red Mountain is a 5,732-foot (1,747 m) mountain in the Cascade Range of Washington state. It is located in Kittitas County, approximately 14 miles (22.5 km) northwest of the town of Roslyn. There is an eponymous mine on the southern side of the mountain at 4,051 feet (1,235 m), where tungsten, molybdenum, and copper were mined.
