= Red Mountain (Santa Clara County, California) =

Mountain in the American state of California

- Location within California

Highest point
- Elevation: 3,658 ft (1,115 m) NAVD 88
- Prominence: 760 ft (230 m) NGVD 29
- Coordinates: 37°24′55″N 121°28′01″W

Geography
- Location: Santa Clara County, California, U.S.
- Parent range: Diablo Range
- Topo map: USGS Mount Boardman

Red Mountain is a mountain summit on the divide of the Diablo Range in Santa Clara County, California. It lies at the northeastern edge of San Antonio Valley, along the border with Stanislaus County, California.

== Magnesite mining ==
Red Mountain is linked to Livermore, California by Mines Rd., and historically was the site of several magnesite mines, the two major mines being the Red Mountain Mine and the Western Mine. One book claims that the deposits on the mountain are the purest known as of 2007, although a USGS report notes that the quality varied between the veins. Mining began in 1905, long after they were discovered due to their long distance from the railroad. A number of magnesite veins are arranged conveniently around a small valley, visible from miles away due to their striking white color. Deposits near the mountain's summit resemble "unglazed porcelain".

As of 1908 the only magnesite-mining company active on Red Mountain was the American Magnesite Company, which shipped it down to factories in Oakland.

According to a California State Mining Bureau report, the Red Mountain Mine site was discovered in 1915. Located on the Stanislaus County side of the mountain, and derived its water supply from a single, large spring. The site was exploited by the newly formed Red Mountain Magnesite Company, later rechristened as the W-K Company and then again in 1922 as the California Magnesite Company. The on-site buildings could accommodate about 30 people at a time.

The magnesite from the mines was initially hauled down to Livermore by six-horse teams pulling to wagons, but one company was using large trucks by 1918. The demand for magnesite increased during World War II due to its applications to incendiary bombs. Once the federal government canceled its contract with the mine owners in 1944, near the end of the war, the settlement that had formed around the mine was abandoned to become a ghost town within a week.
