= Red Mountain (Rossland) =

Mountain in British Columbia, Canada

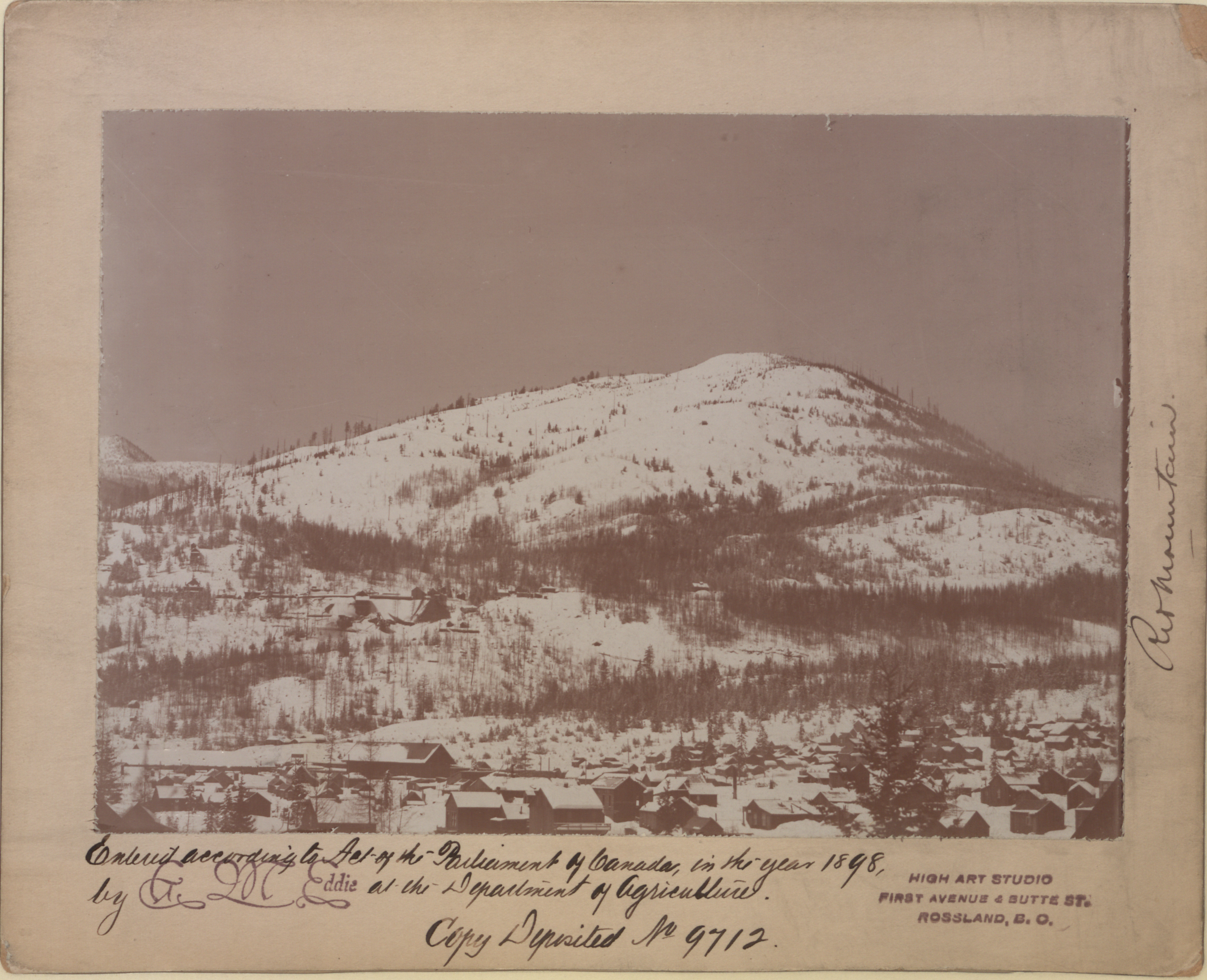
- Moonlit view of Red Mountain, 1898

Highest point
- Elevation: 1,591 m (5,220 ft)
- Prominence: 286 m (938 ft)
- Coordinates: 49°05′31″N 117°49′16″W

Geography
- Location within British Columbia
- Interactive map of Red Mountain
- Location: British Columbia, Canada
- District: Kootenay Land District
- Topo map: NTS 82F4 Trail

Red Mountain is the lower of three mountains that make up the Red Mountain Ski Area. It is nestled within the Monashee Mountains.

== See also ==
- Red Mountain Ski Resort
