= Red Mountain Resort =

Ski resort in British Columbia, Canada

Coordinates: 49°06′10″N 117°49′13″W

- Location within British Columbia Location within Canada
- Location: British Columbia, Canada
- Nearest city: Rossland, British Columbia
- Vertical: 887 m (2,910 ft)
- Top elevation: 2,072 m (6,798 ft)
- Base elevation: 1,185 m (3,888 ft)
- Skiable area: Lift-served; 2,682 acres (10.9 km^{2}); Total; 4,200 acres (17.0 km^{2})
- Trails: 110 named: 16% Beginner
- Longest run: 7 km (4.3 mi) - 47% Intermediate: 37% Expert
- Lift system: 6
- Terrain parks: 1
- Snowfall: 750 cm (300 in)
- Snowmaking: Yes
- Night skiing: Yes
- Website: redresort.com

RED Mountain Resort is a ski resort in western Canada, located on Granite, Grey, Kirkup, and Red Mountains in Rossland, a former gold mining town in the West Kootenay region of southeastern British Columbia. RED Mountain is one of the oldest ski hills in North America, with a history dating back to the creation of the Red Mountain Ski Club (RMSC) in the first decade of the 1900s. RED Mountain is located in the Monashee Mountains just north of the U.S. border. Like other ski hills in the British Columbia Interior, it has a reputation for light, dry powder, with yearly snowfall of 750 cm (300 in).

== History ==
In the summer of 1958, a new slalom slope was cleared by the RMSC for racing practice. Work was delayed until the fall due to threats of forest fires. During the 1958–59 season, daily lift tickets were $3.50 for the general public and $2.25 for RMSC members (or 40 cents for a single ride), in Canadian currency.

In 1968 the Red Mountain Ski Club hosted the first-ever FIS Alpine World Cup in Canada including both a Men's and Women's Giant Slalom and Slalom.

In the summer of 2013, a third peak was added, Grey Mountain, adding 1,000 acres (4.0 km^{2}) of terrain and 22 named runs.

In December 2024, the resort made Canadian headlines when a farmer heckled Canadian Prime Minister Justin Trudeau at the resort.

== See also ==
- Red Mountain (disambiguation)
