= Rossland Range =

Mountain range in British Columbia, Canada

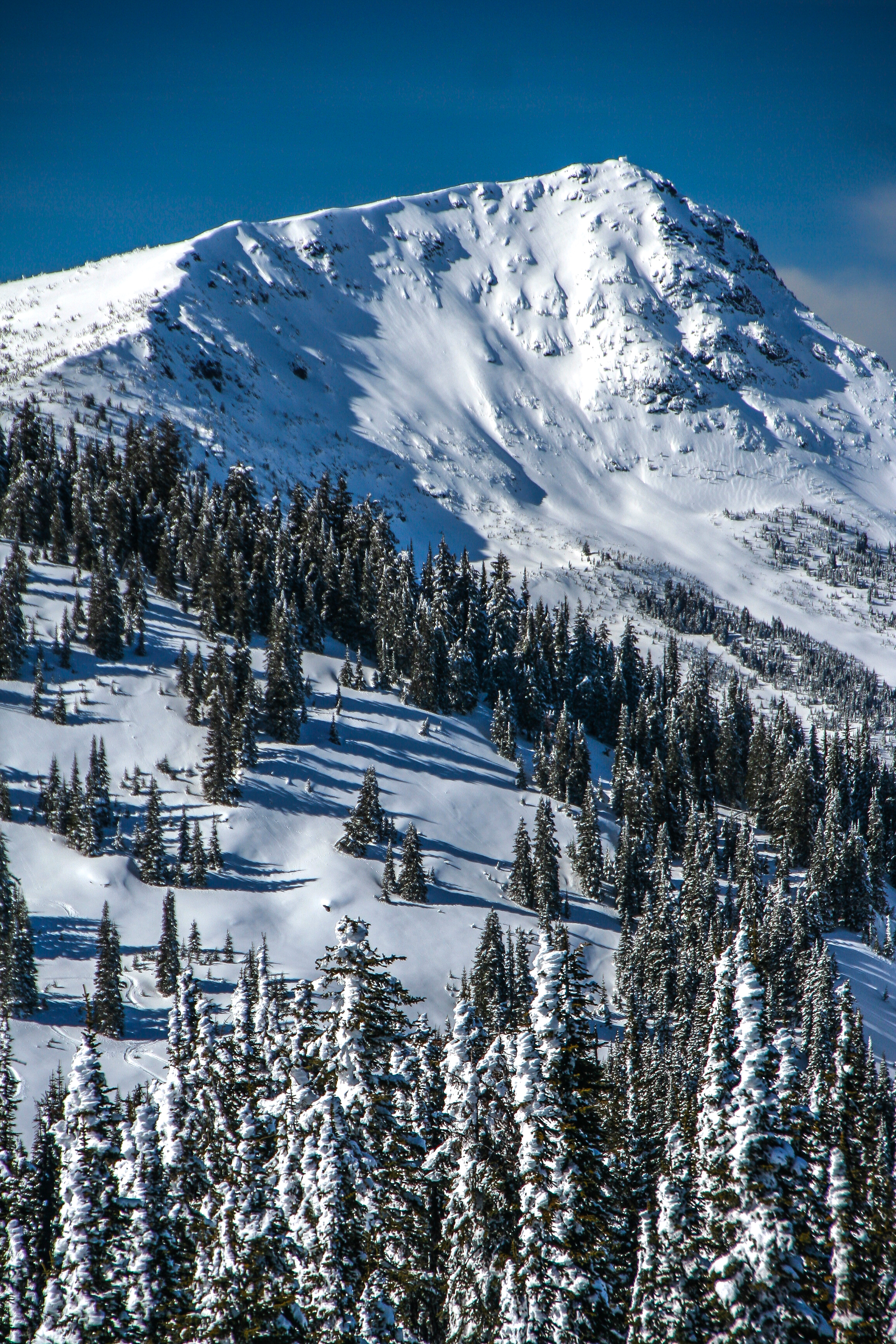
- Old Glory Mountain, the high point of the range

Geography
- Location within British Columbia
- Country: Canada
- Province: British Columbia
- Range coordinates: 49°11′N 117°54′W
- Parent range: Monashee Mountains

The Rossland Range is a subrange of the Monashee Mountains of the Columbia Mountains, between the Columbia River and Big Sheep Creek in British Columbia, Canada. The highest point in the range is Old Glory Mountain, 2,376-metre (7,795-foot).

== See also ==
- Geography of British Columbia
- Geology of British Columbia
