= Fortress Pass (Canadian Rockies) =

Mountain pass that crosses the Canadian Rockies south of Jasper

- Location within Alberta Location within British Columbia
- Elevation: 1,335 m (4,380 ft)

Third Approach
- Location: Alberta–British Columbia border, Canada
- Range: Canadian Rockies
- Coordinates: 52°21′41″N 117°42′20″W
- Topo map: NTS 83C5 Fortress Lake

Fortress Pass is a mountain pass that crosses the continental divide in the Canadian Rockies, south of Jasper, Alberta. At 1,335 metres (4,380 ft), Fortress Pass is (along with Monkman Pass) one of the lowest passes to cross the Canadian Rockies that is not traversed by a road. In addition to being at a low elevation, Fortress Pass is also relatively gentle, with almost no elevation difference between water bodies on either side.

On the west side of the pass is Fortress Lake in British Columbia, which drains via the Wood River into the Columbia River and the Pacific Ocean. On the east side of the pass, in Alberta, the Chaba River is fed by the Chaba Icefield to the south and drains via the Athabasca River into the Mackenzie River and the Arctic Ocean.

The west side of the pass is protected as part of Hamber Provincial Park while the east side is protected as part of Jasper National Park. The two parks are components of the Canadian Rocky Mountain Parks World Heritage Site.

Fortress Pass and Fortress Lake are both named for Fortress Mountain [not to be confused with The Fortress (Alberta)], which overlooks both from the north.
