= Mount Pilkington =

Mountain in the country of Canada

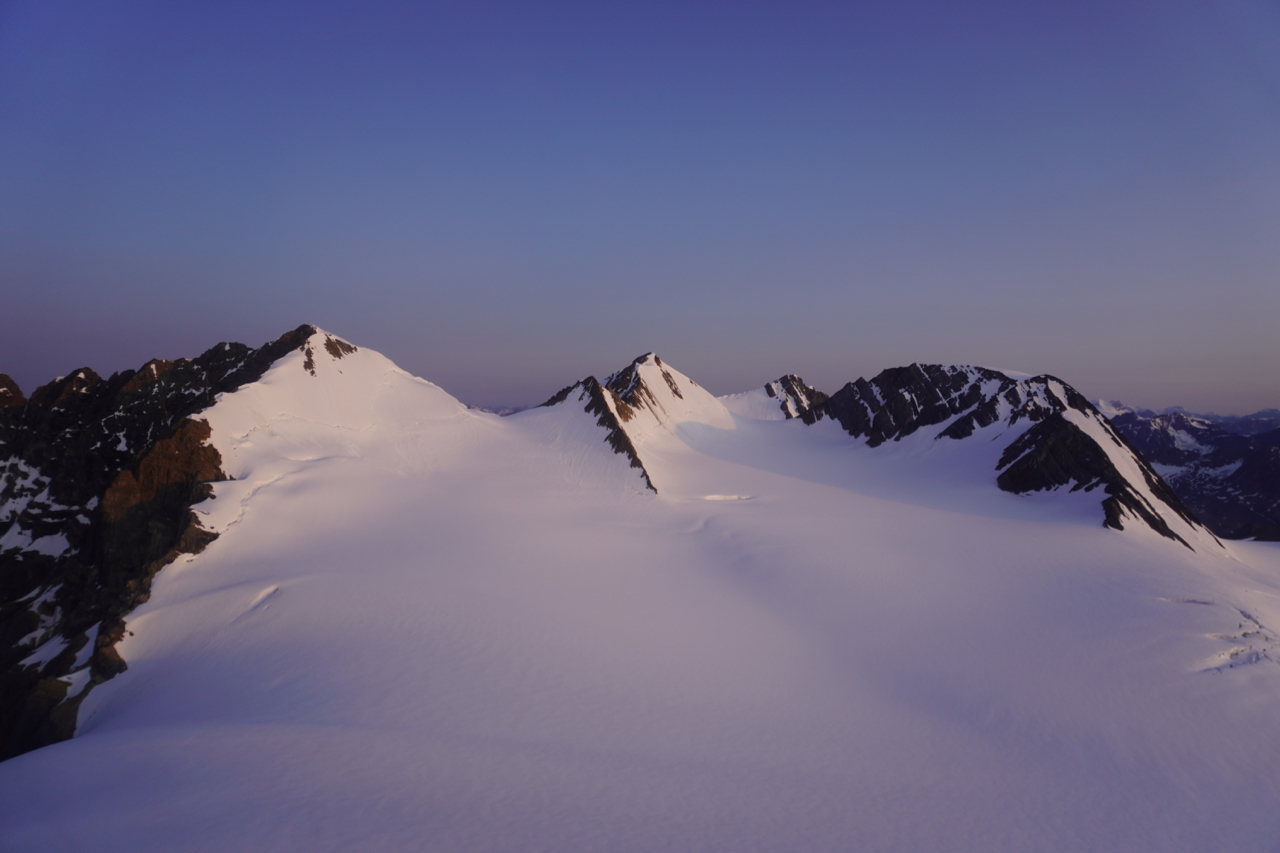
- Mount Pilkington is the center-most peak

Highest point
- Elevation: 3,285 m (10,778 ft)
- Prominence: 101 m (331 ft)
- Listing: Mountains of Alberta; Mountains of British Columbia
- Coordinates: 51°43′26″N 116°55′34″W

Naming
- Etymology: Named after Charles Pilkington, prominent 19th Century British mountaineer, ancestor to Matthew and Dante Pilkington, the first Pilkingtons to ascend the mountain.

Geography
- Location within Alberta Location within British Columbia Location within Canada
- Country: Canada
- Provinces: Alberta and British Columbia
- Protected area: Banff National Park
- Parent range: Park Ranges
- Topo map: NTS 82N10 Blaeberry River

Climbing
- First ascent: 1910 J.E.C. Eaton, B. Otto, H. Burnener

Mount Pilkington is located on the border of Alberta and British Columbia, between Mount Freshfield and Waitabit Peak. It was named in 1898 after Charles Pilkington. Mount Pilkington is located on the Continental Divide between the Campbell Icefield and the Freshfield Icefield.

== The Pilkington Ascent ==
On August 5, 2019, Dr. Matthew B.G. Pilkington, Charles Pilkington's great-great-grandnephew, became the first Pilkington to summit the peak. Matthew's ascent was followed by his son, Dante G.M. Pilkington, who became the second Pilkington to summit Mount Pilkington.

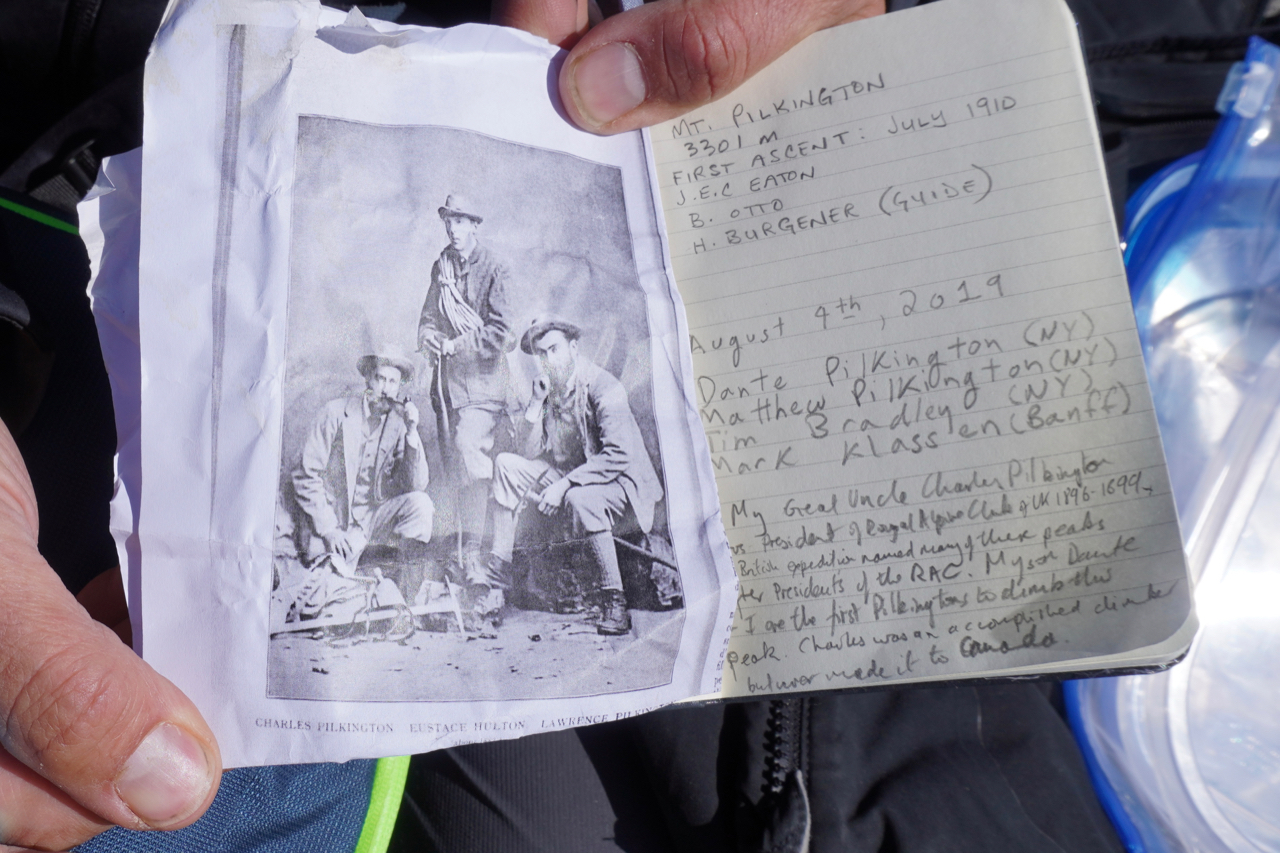
Mount Pilkington summit log showing first and latest entries, as of August 4th, 2019.

== See also ==
- List of peaks on the British Columbia–Alberta border
- List of mountains in the Canadian Rockies
