= Chaba Peak =

Mountain in Alberta and British Columbia, Canada

- Location within Alberta Location within British Columbia Location within Canada

Highest point
- Elevation: 3,212 m (10,538 ft)
- Prominence: 278 m (912 ft)
- Parent peak: Apex Mountain (3250 m)
- Listing: Mountains of Alberta; Mountains of British Columbia
- Coordinates: 52°11′52″N 117°40′18″W

Geography
- Country: Canada
- Provinces: Alberta and British Columbia
- District: Kootenay Land District
- Parent range: Chaba Icefield Park Ranges
- Topo map: NTS 83C4 Clemenceau Icefield

Climbing
- First ascent: September 6, 1928 by E. Schoeller and Julius Rahmi (guide)

Chaba Peak is located in the Chaba Icefield south of Fortress Lake in Hamber Provincial Park on the Continental Divide marking the Alberta-British Columbia border. It was named in 1920 after the Chaba River by the Interprovincial Boundary Survey. Chaba is the Stoney Indian word for beaver.

== See also ==
- List of peaks on the Alberta–British Columbia border
- List of mountains in the Canadian Rockies
