= Mount Low (Canada) =

Mountain in the country of Canada

- Location within Alberta Location within British Columbia Location within Canada

Highest point
- Elevation: 3,090 m (10,140 ft)
- Prominence: 130 m (430 ft)
- Parent peak: Mount Barlow (3143 m)
- Listing: Mountains of Alberta; Mountains of British Columbia
- Coordinates: 51°43′00″N 116°48′06″W

Geography
- Country: Canada
- Provinces: Alberta and British Columbia
- Protected area: Banff National Park
- Parent range: Park Ranges
- Topo map: NTS 82N10 Blaeberry River

Climbing
- First ascent: 1930 by O.E. Cromwell and J. Monroe. Thorington guided by P. Kaufmann

Mount Low is located on the border of Alberta and British Columbia. It was named in 1920 after the Canadian geologist and explorer A. P. Low

== See also ==
- List of peaks on the British Columbia–Alberta border
- List of mountains in the Canadian Rockies
