= Mount Oates =

Canadian mountain

- Location within Alberta Location within British Columbia Location within Canada

Highest point
- Elevation: 3,120 m (10,240 ft)
- Prominence: 285 m (935 ft)
- Parent peak: Mount Scott (3296 m)
- Listing: Mountains of Alberta; Mountains of British Columbia
- Coordinates: 52°26′19″N 118°02′04″W

Geography
- Country: Canada
- Provinces: Alberta and British Columbia
- Protected areas: Jasper National Park; Hamber Provincial Park
- Parent range: Park Ranges
- Topo map: NTS 83D8 Athabasca Pass

Climbing
- First ascent: July 3, 1924 by Alfred J. Ostheimer, M.M. Strumia, J. Monroe Thorington

Mount Oates is a mountain located north of the Hooker Icefield, on the border of Alberta and British Columbia. It was named in 1913 by G.E. Howard for Captain Lawrence Oates a member of the ill-fated 1910-13 Terra Nova Expedition under command of Captain Robert F. Scott.

== See also ==
- List of peaks on the British Columbia–Alberta border
- List of mountains in the Canadian Rockies
