= Ghost Mountain (Chaba Icefield) =

Mountain in British Columbia, Canada

- Location within British Columbia Location within Canada

Highest point
- Elevation: 3,203 m (10,509 ft) (Note: Other sources give 3204 m)
- Prominence: 547 m (1,795 ft)
- Listing: Mountains of British Columbia
- Coordinates: 52°18′36″N 117°53′13″W

Geography
- Country: Canada
- Provinces: British Columbia
- District: Kootenay Land District
- Protected area: Hamber Provincial Park
- Parent range: Park Ranges
- Topo map: NTS 83C5 Fortress Lake

Climbing
- First ascent: July 13, 1927 Alfred J. Ostheimer, Hans Fuhrer

Ghost Mountain is located in the Chaba Icefield at the SW end of Hamber Provincial Park in British Columbia, Canada. It was named in 1920 by the Interprovincial Boundary Survey for its ghost-like appearance.

== See also ==
- List of mountains in the Canadian Rockies
