= Chisel Peak (Park Ranges) =

Mountain in British Columbia, Canada

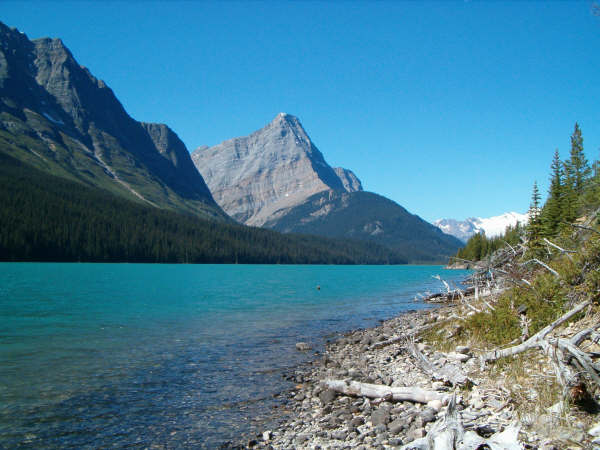
- Chisel Peak seen from Fortress Lake

Highest point
- Elevation: 3,046 m (9,993 ft) (Note: Other sources state 3,049 m.)
- Prominence: 726 m (2,382 ft)
- Parent peak: Ghost Mountain (3203 m)
- Listing: Mountains of British Columbia
- Coordinates: 52°21′00″N 117°49′50″W

Geography
- Location within British Columbia Location within Canada
- Interactive map of Chisel Peak
- Country: Canada
- Province: British Columbia
- District: Kootenay Land District
- Protected area: Hamber Provincial Park
- Parent range: Park Ranges
- Topo map: NTS 83C5 Fortress Lake

Climbing
- First ascent: 1920 Interprovincial Boundary Commission

Chisel Peak is the descriptive name for a remote 3,046-metre (9,993-foot) chisel-shaped mountain summit located above the south shore of Fortress Lake in Hamber Provincial Park in the Canadian Rockies of British Columbia, Canada. Its nearest higher peak is Ghost Mountain, 5.9 km (3.7 mi) to the southwest. The Chaba Icefield lies 8 km (5 mi) to the south, and the Continental Divide is 6 km (4 mi) to the east.

== Geology ==
Chisel Peak is composed of sedimentary rock laid down during the Precambrian to Cambrian periods and pushed east and over the top of younger rock during the Laramide orogeny.

== Climate ==
Based on the Köppen climate classification, Chisel Peak is located in a subarctic climate with cold, snowy winters, and mild summers. Temperatures can drop below −20 °C with wind chill factors below −30 °C. The months July through September offer the most favorable weather for viewing and climbing.

== Gallery ==
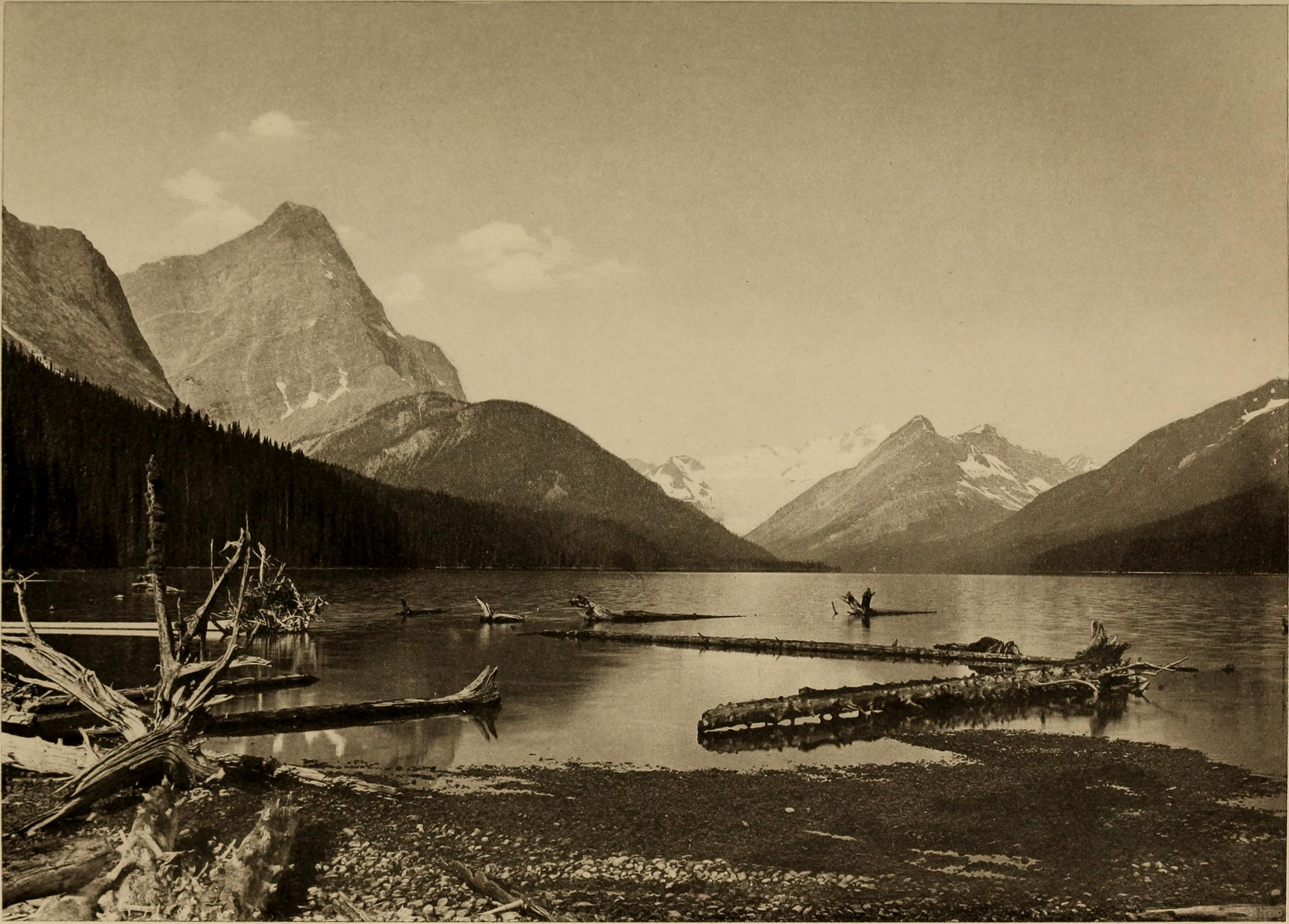
Chisel Peak by Walter Wilcox 1909

== See also ==
- Geology of the Rocky Mountains
- List of mountains in the Canadian Rockies
