= Mount Cairnes (British Columbia) =

Mountain in British Columbia, Canada

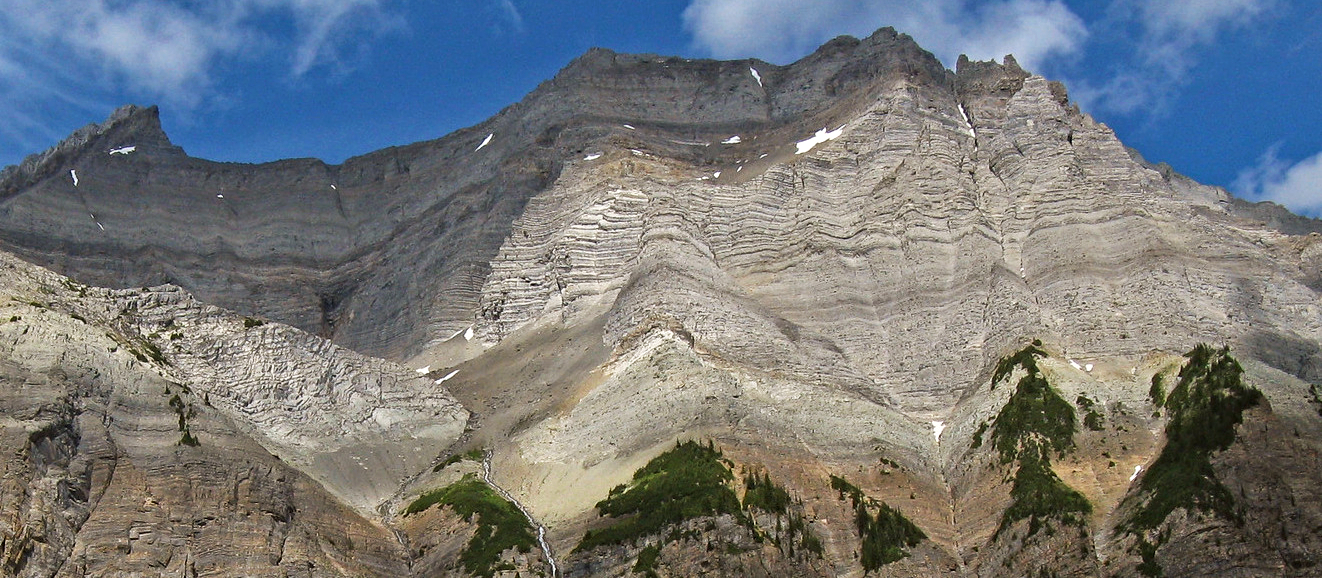
- Mount Cairnes, west aspect

Highest point
- Elevation: 3,060 m (10,040 ft)
- Prominence: 141 m (463 ft)
- Parent peak: Mount Barlow (3143 m)
- Isolation: 3.02 km (1.88 mi)
- Listing: Mountains of British Columbia
- Coordinates: 51°41′05″N 116°46′49″W

Geography
- Location within British Columbia Location within Canada
- Interactive map of Mount Cairnes
- Country: Canada
- Province: British Columbia
- District: Kootenay Land District
- Parent range: Canadian Rockies
- Topo map: NTS 82N10 Blaeberry River

Geology
- Rock age: Cambrian
- Rock type: Sedimentary

Mount Cairnes is a 3,060-metre (10,039 ft) mountain summit located in the Freshfield Ranges of the Canadian Rockies in British Columbia, Canada. The mountain is situated 44 km (27 mi) north of Golden in the Blaeberry Valley, 5.5 km (3.4 mi) east-northeast of Mount Mummery, and 3 km (1.9 mi) from the Continental Divide. The mountain was named in 1917 after noted geologist Delorme Donaldson Cairnes (1879-1917) of the Geological Survey of Canada from 1905 through 1917. The mountain's name was officially adopted March 31, 1924, when approved by the Geographical Names Board of Canada. There is also another Mount Cairnes named for this same person located in Yukon, where he did much of his work. The Cairnes Glacier covers the high-altitude northern slope of the mountain.

== Climate ==
Based on the Köppen climate classification, Mount Cairnes is located in a subarctic climate with cold, snowy winters, and mild summers. Winter temperatures can drop below −20 °C (−4 °F) with wind chill factors below −30 °C (−22 °F). Precipitation runoff from the mountain drains into Blaeberry River which is a tributary of the Columbia River.

== Gallery ==
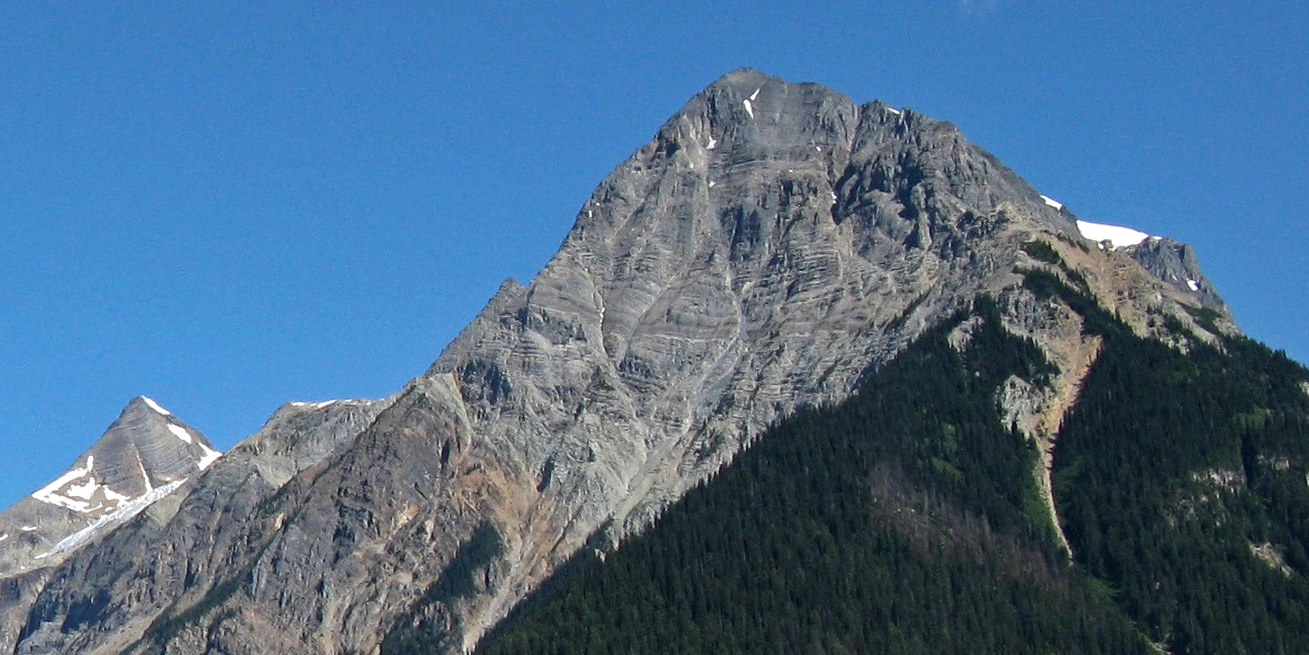
The south ridge of Cairnes

== See also ==
- Geology of the Rocky Mountains
- List of mountains in the Canadian Rockies
