= Eden Peak =

Mountain in Alberta and British Columbia, Canada

- Location within Alberta Location within British Columbia Location within Canada

Highest point
- Elevation: 3,198 m (10,492 ft) (Note: Other sources give 3180 m.)
- Prominence: 267 m (876 ft)
- Parent peak: Apex Mountain (3250 m)
- Listing: Mountains of Alberta; Mountains of British Columbia
- Coordinates: 52°11′16″N 117°43′57″W

Geography
- Country: Canada
- Provinces: Alberta and British Columbia
- Protected area: Jasper National Park
- Parent range: Park Ranges
- Topo map: NTS 83C4 Clemenceau Icefield

Climbing
- First ascent: August 26, 1927 by Alfred J. Ostheimer, Hans Fuhrer, J. Weber

Eden Peak is located on the border of Alberta and British Columbia, east of Cummins Lakes Provincial Park and between the Chaba and Apex Glaciers. It was named in 1901 by Jean Habel.

== See also ==
- List of peaks on the Alberta–British Columbia border
- List of mountains in the Canadian Rockies
