= Younghusband Ridge =

Ridge in Alberta and British Columbia, Canada

- Location within Alberta Location within British Columbia Location within Canada

Highest point
- Elevation: 3,170 m (10,400 ft) (Note: Other sources state 3150 m.)
- Prominence: 130 m (430 ft)
- Parent peak: Apex Mountain (3250 m)
- Listing: Mountains of Alberta; Mountains of British Columbia
- Coordinates: 52°14′09″N 117°48′54″W

Geography
- Country: Canada
- Provinces: Alberta and British Columbia
- District: Kootenay
- Protected area: Jasper National Park
- Parent range: Park Ranges
- Topo map: NTS 83C4 Clemenceau Icefield

Climbing
- First ascent: July 28, 1927 by Alfred J. Ostheimer, guided by Hans Fuhrer

Younghusband Ridge is located east of Wood Arm Kinbasket Lake and straddles the Continental Divide marking the Alberta-British Columbia border. It was named in 1927 by Alfred J. Ostheimer after Lt. Col. Sir Francis Younghusband.

== See also ==
- List of mountains in the Canadian Rockies
- List of peaks on the Alberta–British Columbia border
