= Mount Scott (Canada) =

Mountain in the country of Canada

- Location within Alberta Location within British Columbia Location within Canada

Highest point
- Elevation: 3,300 m (10,800 ft)
- Prominence: 966 m (3,169 ft)
- Parent peak: Mount Fryatt (3361 m)
- Listing: Mountains of Alberta; Mountains of British Columbia
- Coordinates: 52°26′54″N 118°03′21″W

Geography
- Country: Canada
- Provinces: Alberta and British Columbia
- Protected areas: Jasper National Park; Hamber Provincial Park
- Parent range: Park Ranges
- Topo map: NTS 83D8 Athabasca Pass

Climbing
- First ascent: 1928 W.R. Hainsworth, M.M. Strumia

Mount Scott is located on the border of Alberta and British Columbia, North of the Hooker Icefield in Hamber Provincial Park. It is Alberta's 44th highest peak, and Alberta's 46th most prominence mountain. It is also British Columbia's 57th highest peak. It was named in 1913 after Captain Robert Falcon Scott.

== See also ==
- List of peaks on the British Columbia–Alberta border
- List of mountains in the Canadian Rockies
