= Chaba =

Chaba may refer to:

- Chaba, J-Pop group
- Chaba River, Canada
- Chaba River China
- Typhoon Chaba (disambiguation)
