= Waitabit Peak =

Mountain in Alberta and British Columbia, Canada

- Location within Alberta Location within British Columbia Location within Canada

Highest point
- Elevation: 3,090 m (10,140 ft)
- Prominence: 108 m (354 ft)
- Parent peak: Mount Barnard (3339 m)
- Listing: Mountains of Alberta; Mountains of British Columbia
- Coordinates: 51°42′09″N 116°54′00″W

Geography
- Country: Canada
- Provinces: Alberta and British Columbia
- Protected area: Banff National Park
- Parent range: Park Ranges
- Topo map: NTS 82N10 Blaeberry River

Waitabit Peak is located on the border of Alberta and British Columbia. It was named in 1900 after Waitabit Creek.

== See also ==
- List of peaks on the British Columbia–Alberta border
