= Mount Whiteaves =

Mountain in Alberta and British Columbia, Canada

- Location within Alberta Location within British Columbia Location within Canada

Highest point
- Elevation: 3,145 m (10,318 ft)
- Prominence: 285 m (935 ft)
- Listing: Mountains of Alberta; Mountains of British Columbia
- Coordinates: 51°43′27″N 116°47′56″W

Geography
- Country: Canada
- Provinces: Alberta and British Columbia
- Parent range: Park Ranges
- Topo map: NTS 82N10 Blaeberry River

Climbing
- First ascent: 1949 D. Greenwell, E.R. LaChapelle, D.M. Woods, J. Bishop

Mount Whiteaves is located west of the upper Blaeberry River and straddles the Continental Divide marking the Alberta-British Columbia border. It was named in 1920 after Joseph Frederick Whiteaves, a British palaeontologist.

== See also ==
- List of peaks on the Alberta–British Columbia border
- List of mountains in the Canadian Rockies
