= Nanga Parbat Mountain (Canada) =

Mountain in Alberta and British Columbia, Canada

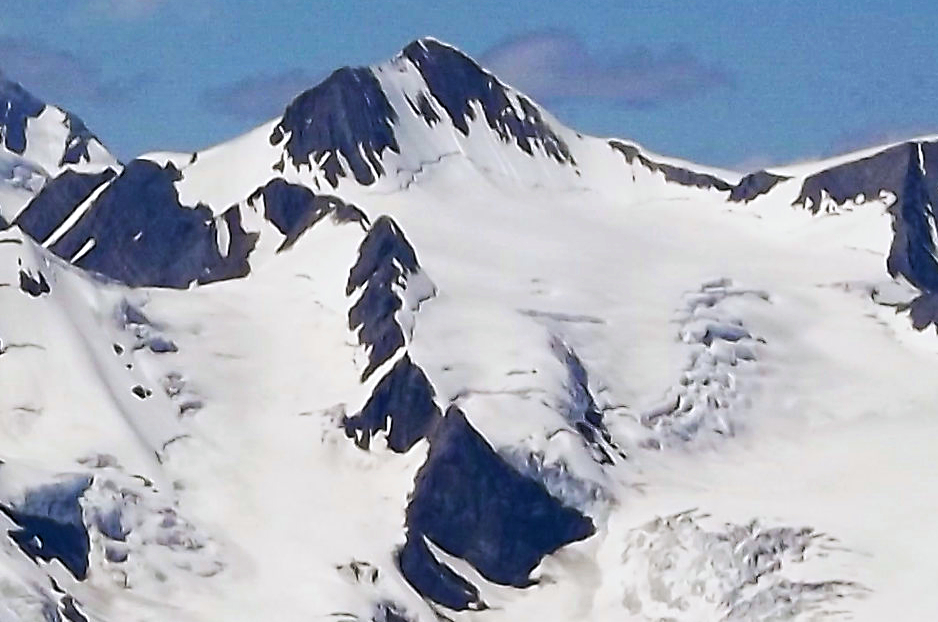

Highest point
- Elevation: 3,240 m (10,630 ft)
- Prominence: 270 m (890 ft)
- Parent peak: Mount Barnard (3340 m)
- Listing: Mountains of Alberta; Mountains of British Columbia
- Coordinates: 51°42′21″N 116°51′56″W

Geography
- Location within Alberta Location within British Columbia Location within Canada
- Country: Canada
- Provinces: Alberta and British Columbia
- Parent range: Park Ranges
- Topo map: NTS 82N10 Blaeberry River

Climbing
- First ascent: 1922 Howard Palmer, J. Monroe Thorington, Edward Feuz Jr.

Nanga Parbat Mountain is located on the border of Alberta and British Columbia at the head of the Mummery Glacier, North of Golden. It was named in 1898 by J. Norman Collie after the ninth highest mountain in the world Nanga Parbat, located in the Himalayas. Collie had climbed on Nanga Parbat in 1895.

== See also ==
- List of peaks on the British Columbia–Alberta border
