= Mount Laussedat =

Mountain in British Columbia, Canada

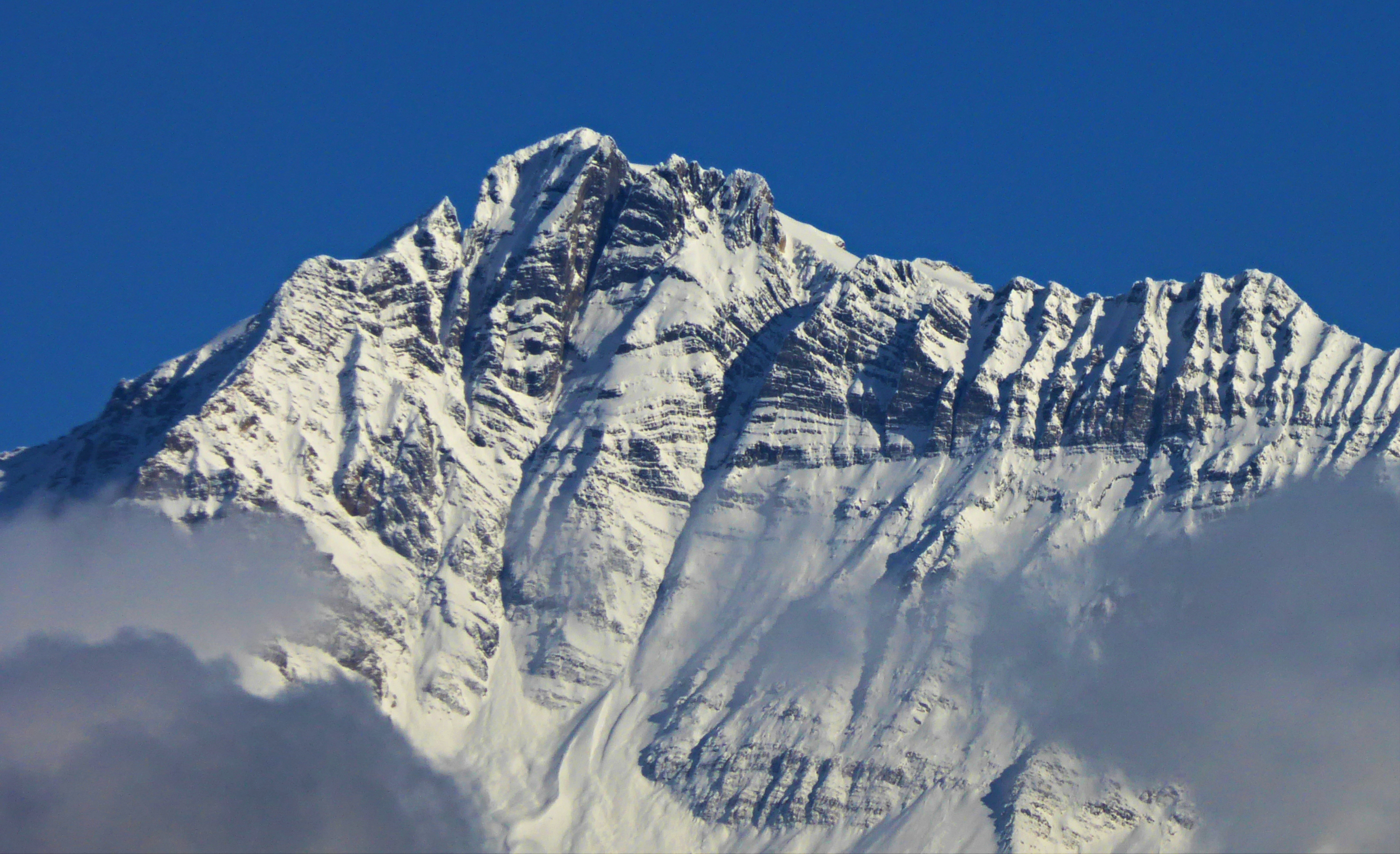
- Mount Laussedat, south aspect

Highest point
- Elevation: 3,052 m (10,013 ft)
- Prominence: 986 m (3,235 ft)
- Parent peak: Mount Mummery (3328 m)
- Listing: Mountains of British Columbia
- Coordinates: 51°34′20″N 116°57′20″W

Geography
- Location within British Columbia Location within Canada
- Country: Canada
- Province: British Columbia
- District: Kootenay Land District
- Parent range: Southwest Central Park Ranges; Canadian Rockies
- Topo map: NTS 82N10 Blaeberry River

Geology
- Rock age: Cambrian
- Rock type: Sedimentary

Climbing
- First ascent: 1906

Mount Laussedat is a 3,052-metre (10,013 ft) mountain summit located in the Canadian Rockies of British Columbia, Canada. It is the highest point in the Southwest Central Park Ranges. The mountain is situated 29 km (18 mi) north of Golden in the Blaeberry Valley. The first ascent of the mountain was made in 1906 by C. B. Sissons, Arthur Oliver Wheeler, and M. Wheeler. The peak was named in 1911 by surveyor Arthur Oliver Wheeler for Aimé Laussedat (1819-1907), a French military officer whose pioneering photographic surveying techniques were used by Wheeler and Canada's Interprovincial Boundary Surveyors. The mountain's name was officially adopted March 31, 1924, when approved by the Geographical Names Board of Canada.

== Climate ==
Based on the Köppen climate classification, Mount Laussedat is located in a subarctic climate zone with cold, snowy winters, and mild summers. Temperatures can drop below −20 °C with wind chill factors below −30 °C. Precipitation runoff from the mountain drains north into Waitabit Creek, or south into the Blaeberry River, which are both tributaries of the Columbia River.

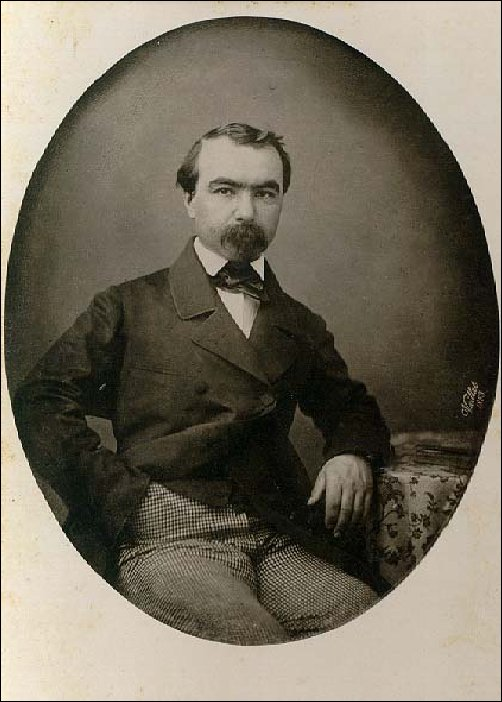
Aimé Laussedat

== See also ==
- Geology of the Rocky Mountains
- List of mountains in the Canadian Rockies
