= Wales Peak =

Mountain in Alberta and British Columbia, Canada

- Location within Alberta Location within British Columbia Location within Canada

Highest point
- Elevation: 3,121 m (10,240 ft) (Note: Other sources state 3109 m.)
- Prominence: 210 m (690 ft)
- Parent peak: Chaba Peak (3212 m)
- Listing: Mountains of Alberta; Mountains of British Columbia
- Coordinates: 52°11′06″N 117°39′21″W

Geography
- Country: Canada
- Provinces: Alberta and British Columbia
- Parent range: Park Ranges
- Topo map: NTS 83C4 Clemenceau Icefield

Climbing
- First ascent: 1927 J. DeLaittre, W. MacLaurin, J. Weber

Wales Peak is located East of Wood Arm in Kinbasket Lake and straddles the Continental Divide marking the Alberta-British Columbia border. It was named in 1927 by Alfred J. Ostheimer after the British astronomer William Wales who sailed on Captain Cook's second voyage of discovery.

== See also ==
- List of peaks on the Alberta–British Columbia border
- List of mountains in the Canadian Rockies
