= Oppy Mountain =

Mountain in Banff National Park, Canada

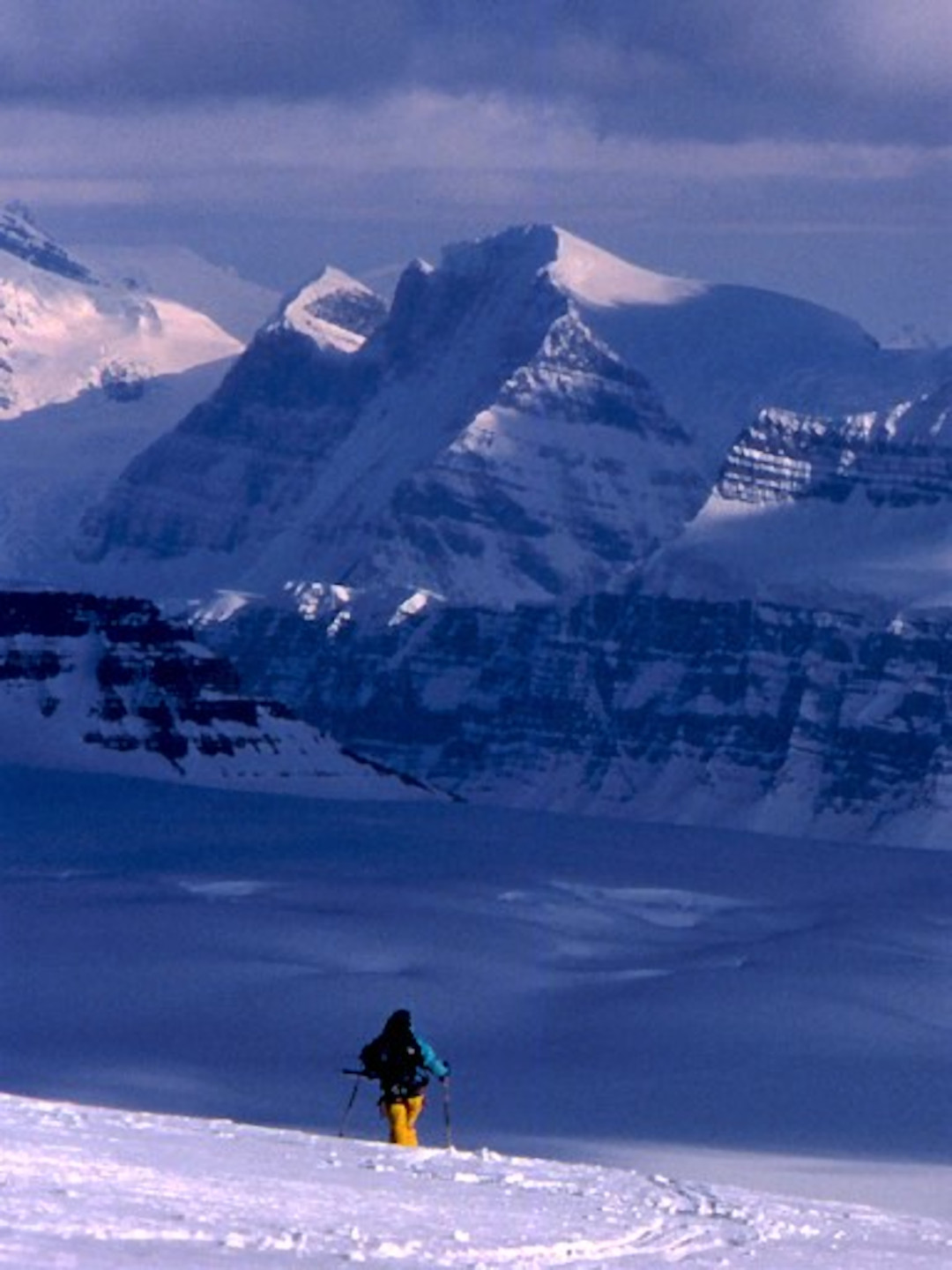
- Oppy Mountain from the Columbia Icefield

Highest point
- Elevation: 3,311 m (10,863 ft) (Note: Other sources give 3335 m.)
- Prominence: 311 m (1,020 ft)
- Parent peak: Mount Alexandra (3401 m)
- Listing: Mountains of Alberta; Mountains of British Columbia
- Coordinates: 51°58′24″N 117°08′56″W

Geography
- Location within Alberta Location within British Columbia Location within Canada
- Country: Canada
- Provinces: Alberta and British Columbia
- Protected area: Banff National Park
- Parent range: Park Ranges
- Topo map: NTS 82N14 Rostrum Peak

Climbing
- First ascent: 1947 J.C. Oberlin, R. Davis, D.M. Woods

Oppy Mountain is located on the border of Alberta and British Columbia, North of the head of Lyell Creek. It was named in 1918 by interprovincial boundary surveyors after Oppy, a village in France. During World War I. the village had been captured by Germany in 1914. In May 1917, many Canadian soldiers were killed in the area during the Third Battle of the Scarpe.

== Geology ==
Oppy Mountain is composed of sedimentary rock laid down from the Precambrian to Jurassic periods. Formed in shallow seas, this sedimentary rock was pushed east and over the top of younger rock during the Laramide orogeny.

== Climate ==
Based on the Köppen climate classification, Oppy Mountain is located in a subarctic climate with cold, snowy winters, and mild summers. Temperatures can drop below -20 °C with wind chill factors below -30 °C. Weather conditions during summer months are optimum for climbing.

== See also ==
- List of peaks on the Alberta–British Columbia border
- List of mountains in the Canadian Rockies
