= Mount Shackleton (British Columbia) =

Mountain in British Columbia, Canada

- Location within British Columbia

Highest point
- Elevation: 3,327 m (10,915 ft)
- Prominence: 557 m (1,827 ft)
- Parent peak: Tusk Peak (3362 m)
- Isolation: 3.57 km (2.22 mi)
- Listing: Mountains of British Columbia
- Coordinates: 52°11′01″N 117°54′11″W

Naming
- Etymology: Ernest Shackleton

Geography
- Country: Canada
- Province: British Columbia
- District: Kootenay Land District
- Parent range: Park Ranges
- Topo map: NTS 83C4 Clemenceau Icefield

Climbing
- First ascent: 14 July 1951 George I. Bell and David Michael

Mount Shackleton is a mountain located in the Clemenceau Icefield, east of Cummins Lakes Provincial Park. It was named in 1923 for Antarctic explorer Ernest Shackleton, who had died the previous year.

== See also ==
- List of mountains in the Canadian Rockies
