= Chaba River =

Chaba River may refer to:

- Chaba River (Canada), a river in Alberta, Canada
- Chaba River (China), a river in Chongqing Municipality, China
