= Mount Mummery =

Mountain in British Columbia, Canada

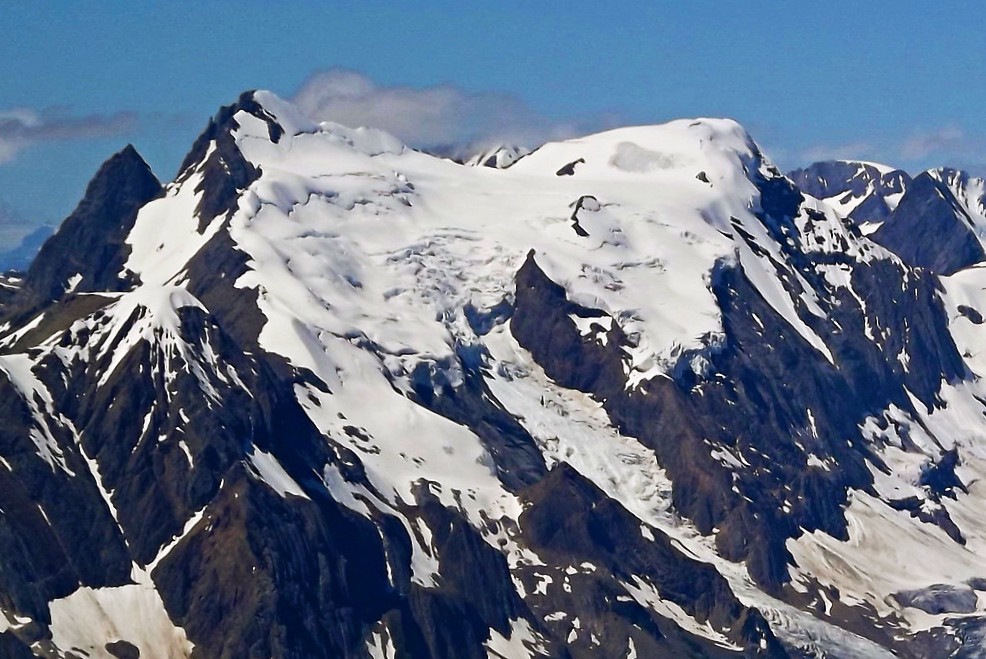
- Mount Mummery, east aspect

Highest point
- Elevation: 3,331 m (10,928 ft) (Note: Other sources give 3328 m.)
- Prominence: 481 m (1,578 ft)
- Parent peak: Mount Barnard (3340 m)
- Listing: Mountains of British Columbia
- Coordinates: 51°39′53″N 116°51′00″W

Geography
- Location within British Columbia Location within Canada
- Interactive map of Mount Mummery
- Location: British Columbia, Canada
- District: Kootenay Land District
- Parent range: Freshfield Icefield Ranges; Park Ranges; Canadian Rockies
- Topo map: NTS 82N10 Blaeberry River

Geology
- Rock age: Cambrian
- Rock type: Sedimentary

Climbing
- First ascent: 1906

Mount Mummery is a 3,331-metre (10,928 ft) glaciated double summit mountain located in the Canadian Rockies of British Columbia, Canada. It is the highest point in the Mummery Group, and fourth-highest in the Freshfield Icefield Ranges. The mountain is situated 42 km (26 mi) north of Golden on the southern edge of the Freshfield Icefield, in the Blaeberry Valley, less than 4 km (2.5 mi) from the Continental Divide.

The mountain was named in 1898 by J. Norman Collie after Albert F. Mummery (1855-1895), a famous British mountaineer who perished attempting to climb Nanga Parbat in the Himalayas. Collie named many peaks in the Canadian Rockies, and was a climbing companion who accompanied Mummery on the Nanga Parbat expedition. Around the same time, nearby Nanga Parbat Mountain was also named by Collie. Mount Mummery's name was officially adopted March 31, 1924, when approved by the Geographical Names Board of Canada.

The first ascent of the mountain was made in 1906 by I. Tucker Burr Jr, Samuel Cabot Jr, W. Rodman Peabody, Robert Walcott, with guides Gottfried Feuz, Jürgen Ehfoloff and Christian Kaufmann.

== Climate ==
Based on the Köppen climate classification, Mount Mummery is located in a subarctic climate zone with cold, snowy winters, and mild summers. Temperatures can drop below −20 °C (−4 °F) with wind chill factors below −30 °C (−22 °F). Precipitation runoff from the mountain and meltwater from the Mummery Glacier drains into Blaeberry River and Waitabit Creek, which are both tributaries of the Columbia River.

== Gallery ==
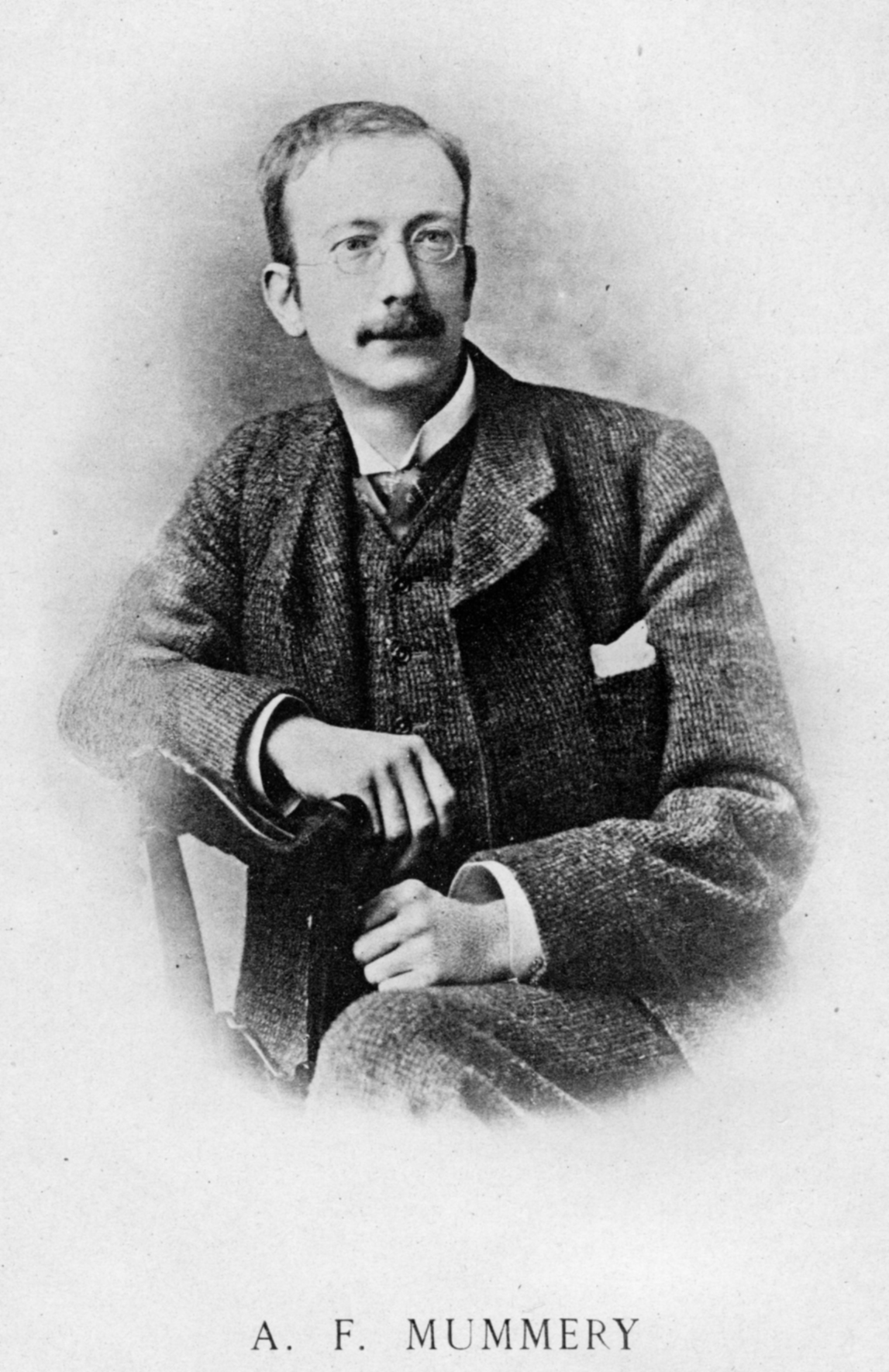
Albert Mummery

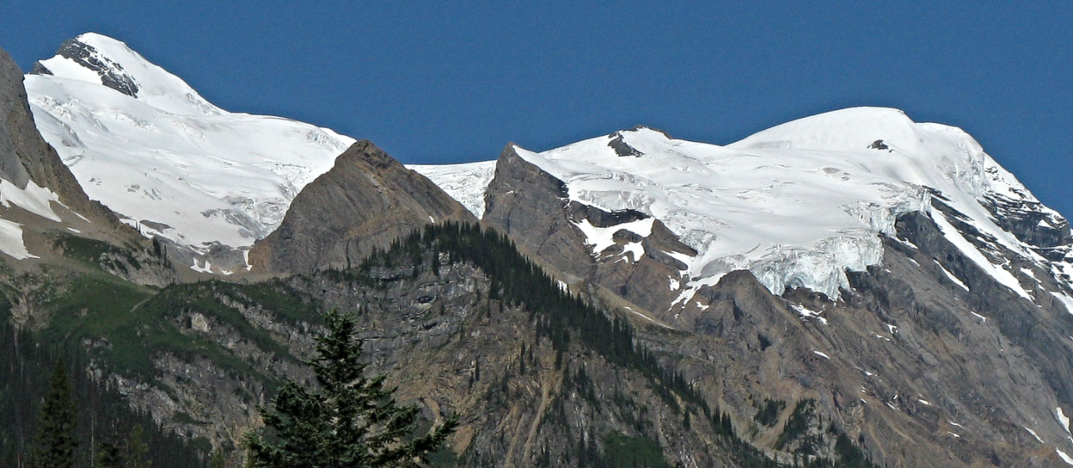
Mount Mummery's 3331-metre summit left, 3320-metre summit right

== See also ==
- Geology of the Rocky Mountains
- List of mountains in the Canadian Rockies
