= Mount Spring-Rice =

Mountain in Alberta and British Columbia, Canada

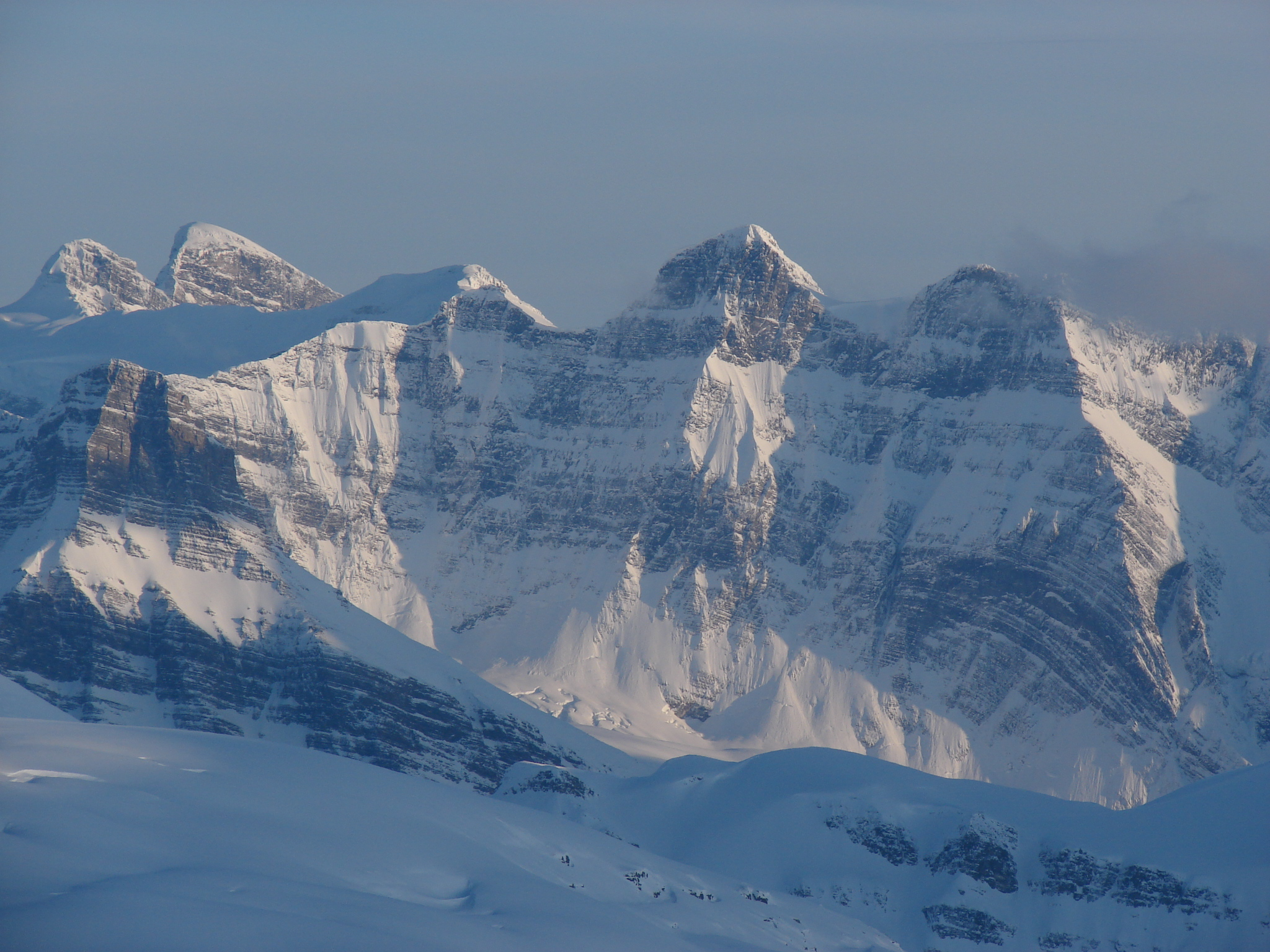

Highest point
- Elevation: 3,275 m (10,745 ft)
- Prominence: 426 m (1,398 ft)
- Parent peak: Mount Alexandra (3401 m)
- Listing: Mountains of Alberta; Mountains of British Columbia
- Coordinates: 52°01′00″N 117°14′08″W

Geography
- Location within Alberta Location within British Columbia Location within Canada
- Country: Canada
- Provinces: Alberta and British Columbia
- Protected area: Banff National Park
- Parent range: Park Ranges
- Topo map: NTS 83C3 Columbia Icefield

Climbing
- First ascent: 1923 J. W. A. Hickson, E. Feuz

Mount Spring-Rice is located on the border of Alberta and British Columbia, south of Thompson Pass. It was named in 1918 by Arthur O. Wheeler after the British diplomat, Sir Cecil Spring Rice.

== See also ==
- List of peaks on the British Columbia–Alberta border
- List of mountains in the Canadian Rockies
