= List of mountains in the Canadian Rockies =

A list of highest mountains and peaks in the Canadian Rockies over 3,000 m (9,800 ft) is shown below. Sources for the elevation, prominence and first ascent can be found in their respective pages and/or Wikidata.

Rank	Mountain / Peak	Elevation		Prominence		Subrange	FA	Notes
Rank	Mountain / Peak	m	ft	m	ft	Subrange	FA	Notes
1	Mount Robson	3,954	12,972	2,829	9,281	Rainbow Range	1913	Highest point in the Canadian Rockies
2	Mount Columbia	3,747	12,293	2,383	7,818	Winston Churchill Range	1902	Highest point in Alberta
3	North Twin Peak	3,730	12,240	1,010	3,310	Winston Churchill Range	1923	Highest peak of The Twins Massif
4	Mount Clemenceau	3,664	12,021	1,499	4,918	Park Ranges	1923	Named for Georges Clemenceau, premier of France during WWI
5	Mount Alberta	3,619	11,873	819	2,687	Winston Churchill Range	1925	Most difficult +11,000 climbing objective
6	Mount Assiniboine	3,618	11,870	2,086	6,844	Continental Ranges	1901	Highest point in the Southern Rockies
7	Mount Forbes	3,612	11,850	1,629	5,344	Park Ranges	1902	Highest point within the confines of Banff Nat'l Park
8	Mount Goodsir	3,567	11,703	1,887	6,191	Ottertail Range	1903	Two major summits: South Tower and North Tower (lowest)
9	South Twin Peak	3,566	11,699	341	1,119	Winston Churchill Range	1924	Lowest peak of The Twins Massif
10	Mount Temple	3,543	11,624	1,544	5,066	Bow Range	1894	Highest point near Lake Louise
11	Mount Bryce	3,507	11,506	707	2,320	Park Ranges	1902	Named for James Bryce, president of the Alpine Club
12	Mount Kitchener	3,505	11,499	280	920	Winston Churchill Range	1927	First named Mt. Douglas, renamed for Lord Kitchener after he was killed in WWI
13	Mount Lyell	3,498	11,476	1,078	3,537	Park Ranges	1902	Named for a Scottish Geologist
14	Mount Hungabee	3,492	11,457	987	3,238	Bow Range	1903	Hungabee is the Nakoda word for chieftain
15	Mount Athabasca	3,491	11,453	671	2,201	Park Ranges	1898	Athabasca is the Cree name for "where there are reeds"
16	Mount King Edward	3,490	11,450	770	2,530	Park Ranges	1924	Named for Edward VII
17	Mount Brazeau	3,470	11,380	1,443	4,734	Park Ranges	1923	Named for a translator of the Palliser expedition
18	Mount Victoria	3,464	11,365	547	1,795	Bow Range	1897	Named for Queen Victoria
19	Snow Dome	3,456	11,339	171	561	Winston Churchill Range	1898	Its permanently snow and ice-capped massif resembles a dome
20	Mount Andromeda	3,450	11,320	330	1,080	Park Ranges	1930	Named for Andromeda of Greek mythology
20	Stutfield Peak	3,450	11,320	290	950	Winston Churchill Range	1927	Named for Hugh Stutfield, an early explorer of the Canadian Rockies
20	Mount Joffre	3,450	11,320	1,505	4,938	Elk Range	1919	Named for Joseph Joffre, a French general during WWI
23	Lunette Peak	3,428	11,247	38	125	Continental Ranges	1901	Origin of the name is not known
24	Resplendent Mountain	3,425	11,237	483	1,585	Rainbow Range	1911	
25	Deltaform Mountain	3,424	11,234	822	2,697	Bow Range	1903	Resembles Delta
26	Mount Lefroy	3,423	11,230	417	1,368	Bow Range	1897	Site of the first fatal climbing accident in Canada (1896)
27	The Helmet	3,420	11,220	128	420	Rainbow Range	1928	Peak on the Mt. Robson massif
28	Christian Peak	3,406	11,175	100	330	Park Ranges	1926	Subpeak of Mount Lyell
28	Mount Sir Douglas	3,406	11,175	1,110	3,640	Spray Mountains	1919	Named for a British army officer
30	Mount Woolley	3,405	11,171	565	1,854	Winston Churchill Range	1925	
31	Mount Alexandra	3,401	11,158	421	1,381	Park Ranges	1902	Named for Queen Alexandra of Denmark
31	Walter Peak	3,401	11,158	143	469	Park Ranges	1927	Subpeak of Mount Lyell
33	Whitehorn Mountain	3,399	11,152	1,747	5,732	Park Ranges	1911	
34	Mount Hector	3,394	11,135	1,759	5,771	Front Ranges	1895	Named for a geologist on the Palliser expedition
35	Mount Cromwell	3,380	11,090	360	1,180	Winston Churchill Range	1936	Named after one of the FA climbers
36	Diadem Peak	3,371	11,060	211	692	Winston Churchill Range	1898	
37	Mount Edith Cavell	3,363	11,033	2,007	6,585	South Jasper Ranges	1915	Most prominent peak entirely in Alberta
38	Mount Warren	3,362	11,030	412	1,352	Park Ranges	1928	Named for a mountain guide
39	Mount Fryatt	3,361	11,027	1,608	5,276	Park Ranges	1926	Named for a British merchant captain executed in World War I
39	Mount Cline	3,361	11,027	1,196	3,924	Front Ranges	1927	
41	Mount Huber	3,348	10,984	158	518	Bow Range	1903	
42	Mount Barnard	3,340	10,960	943	3,094	Park Ranges	1922	
43	Mount Freshfield	3,337	10,948	477	1,565	Park Ranges	1902	Named for a British mountaineer
44	Cataract Peak	3,333	10,935	938	3,077	Front Ranges	1930	Named for location near a waterfall or cataract
45	Mount Mummery	3,331	10,928	481	1,578	Park Ranges	1906	Named for British mountaineer Albert F. Mummery
46	Mount Amery	3,329	10,922	578	1,896	Park Ranges	1929	Named for a British politician/journalist
47	Mount Shackleton	3,327	10,915	557	1,827	Park Ranges	1951	Named for Antarctic explorer Ernest Shackleton
48	Simon Peak	3,322	10,899	1,173	3,848	Park Ranges	1924	
49	Mount Biddle	3,320	10,890	731	2,398	Bow Range	1903	
50	Mount St. Bride	3,315	10,876	1,207	3,960	Sawback Range	1910	
50	Sunwapta Peak	3,315	10,876	1,014	3,327	Park Ranges	1906	
52	Mount Stewart	3,312	10,866	1,117	3,665	Cloister Mountains	Unk	Named for a university professor
53	Mount Ball	3,311	10,863	1,187	3,894	Ball Range	1904	Named for John Ball, an Irish naturalist
53	Oppy Mountain	3,311	10,863	311	1,020	Park Ranges	1947	Named for a village in France, the site of a WW I battle
55	Mount Allen	3,310	10,860	260	850	Bow Range	1904	
55	Mount Vaux	3,310	10,860	830	2,720	Ottertail Range	1901	Named for William Sandys Wright Vaux
57	Eon Mountain	3,305	10,843	558	1,831	Park Ranges	1921	FA climber died on descent
58	Glacier Peak	3,302	10,833	72	236	Bow Range	1909	
59	Howse Peak	3,295	10,810	1,227	4,026	Waputik Mountains	1902	
60	Ringrose Peak	3,292	10,801	137	449	Bow Range	1909	
61	Mount Pilkington	3,285	10,778	101	331	Park Ranges	1910	
62	Mount Spring-Rice	3,275	10,745	426	1,398	Park Ranges	1923	Named for a British diplomat
63	Mount Balfour	3,272	10,735	934	3,064	Waputik Range	1899	Named for a Scottish botanist
64	Cirrus Mountain	3,270	10,730	890	2,920	Front Ranges	1939	Named for cirrus clouds
64	Mount Engelhard	3,270	10,730	210	690	Winston Churchill Range	1930	Named for an American climber
66	Chancellor Peak	3,266	10,715	726	2,382	Ottertail Range	1901	Named for a Canadian judge
67	Mount Wilson	3,260	10,700	880	2,890	Park Ranges	1902	Named for a Canadian guide
68	Sentry Peak	3,257	10,686	242	794	Ottertail Range	Unk	
69	Apex Mountain	3,250	10,660	510	1,670	Park Ranges	1922	Named for its location in the centre of the Clemenceau Icefield
69	Monkhead	3,250	10,660	60	200	Front Ranges	1950	Named for its hood-like appearance similar to a monk
71	Mount Smythe	3,246	10,650	420	1,380	Winston Churchill Range	1951	Named for an English mountaineer
71	Mount Tuzo	3,246	10,650	210	690	Bow Range	1906	Named for female Canadian mountaineer who made FA
73	Neptuak Mountain	3,241	10,633	151	495	Bow Range	1902	
74	Bonnet Peak	3,235	10,614	395	1,296	Sawback Range	1914	
74	Mount Fay	3,235	10,614	389	1,276	Bow Range	1904	
76	Collier Peak	3,232	10,604	94	308	Bow Range	1893	
77	Mount GEC	3,220	10,560	400	1,300	Winston Churchill Range	1948	Named for first names of the first ascent climbers
78	White Pyramid	3,219	10,561	236	774	Waputik Mountains	1939	
79	Mount Rae	3,218	10,558	1,330	4,360	Misty Range	Unk	
80	Blackfriars Peak	3,215	10,548	609	1,998	Canadian Rockies	1953	
81	Chaba Peak	3,212	10,538	391	1,283	Park Ranges	1928	Chaba is the Stoney Indian word for beaver
82	Nigel Peak	3,211	10,535	611	2,005	Canadian Rockies	1919	
83	Mushroom Peak	3,210	10,530	270	890	Winston Churchill Range	1947	
84	Wenkchemna Peak	3,206	10,518	16	52	Bow Range	1923	Wenkchemna is Stoney Indian word for ten
85	Ghost Mountain	3,203	10,509	547	1,795	Park Ranges	1927	
86	Foster Peak	3,201	10,502	996	3,268	Vermilion Range	1933	
87	Mount Stephen	3,199	10,495	989	3,245	Park Ranges	1887	Named for the first president of the Canadian Pacific Railway
88	Eden Peak	3,198	10,492	267	876	Park Ranges	1927	Named for a British astronomer
89	Mount Patterson	3,197	10,489	810	2,660	Waputik Range	1924	Named for a president of the Alpine Club of Canada
90	Unnamed	3,196	10,486	326	1,070	Park Ranges	1930	Formerly known as Mt. Pétain until 2022
91	Mount Foch	3,194	10,479	384	1,260	Park Ranges	1930	Named for a French general who served in World War I
92	Lynx Mountain	3,192	10,472	440	1,440	Rainbow Range	1913	Named for the remains of a lynx found on a nearby glacier.
93	Mount Nelson	3,180	10,430	240	790	Winston Churchill Range	1951	Named for an American climber who died in a climbing accident
94	Mount Robertson	3,177	10,423	281	922	Spray Mountains	1928	Named for a British Army officer during WW I
95	Coronation Mountain	3,176	10,420	436	1,430	Park Ranges	1917	Coronation of King Edward VII and Queen Alexandra
96	Quadra Mountain	3,173	10,410	285	935	Bow Range	1910	Top of mountain consists of four pinnacles
97	Mount Sarrail	3,170	10,400			Canadian Rockies	Unk	Named after French general Maurice Sarrail; Local/WD elevations: "3170"/"3159"
97	Younghusband Ridge	3,170	10,400	130	430	Park Ranges	1927	Named for a British army officer
99	Popes Peak	3,163	10,377	81	266	Bow Range	1903	Named for a Canadian politician
100	Storm Mountain	3,158	10,361	408	1,339	Ball Range	1889	Named by George Dawson for it being shrouded mostly in clouds
101	Stanley Peak	3,155	10,351	248	814	Ball Range	1901	Named for Fred Stanley, sixth Governor-General of Canada
101	Thorington Tower	3,155	10,351	275	902	Winston Churchill Range	1967	
103	Mount Aberdeen	3,152	10,341	566	1,857	Bow Range	1894	Named for the 7th Governor General of Canada
104	Mount Amundsen	3,150	10,330					Named for a British astronomer. Name is not officially recognized.
104	Mount Palmer	3,150	10,330	270	890	Winston Churchill Range	1953	Named for an American explorer
104	Mount Quincy	3,150	10,330	508	1,667	Canadian Rockies	1927	
107	Tumbling Peak	3,145	10,318	685	2,247	Park Ranges	Unk	
107	Mount Whiteaves	3,145	10,318	285	935	Park Ranges	1949	Named for a British palaeontologist
109	Mount Barlow	3,143	10,312	203	666	Park Ranges	1930	Named for a cartographer who died in the 1914 Empress of Ireland disaster.
110	Mist Mountain	3,140	10,300	487	1,598	Misty Range	1946	
111	Odaray Mountain	3,137	10,292	627	2,057	Bow Range	1887	Odaray is the Stony expression for "many waterfalls"
112	Mount Coleman	3,135	10,285	775	2,543	Cloister Mountains	Unk	Named for Arthur Coleman, a Canadian geologist.
113	Mount Little	3,134	10,282	164	538	Bow Range	1916	Named for member of FA party
114	Mount Balinhard	3,130	10,270	605	1,985	Park Ranges	1971	Named for a Scottish Earl
115	Lychnis Mountain	3,124	10,249	244	801	Sawback Range	1969	Named for a flower
116	The President	3,123	10,246	653	2,142	President Range	1901	
117	Mount Ennis	3,122	10,243	147	482	Ottertail Range	1906	Named for the manager of a shipping line.
118	Wales Peak	3,121	10,240	210	690	Park Ranges	1927	Named for a British astronomer.
119	Gong Peak	3,120	10,240	280	920	Winston Churchill Range	1936	
119	Mount Peary	3,120	10,240					
119	Throne Mountain	3,120	10,240	880	2,890	South Jasper Ranges	1926	Named for resemblance to a chair.
119	Mount Weiss	3,120	10,240	210	690	Winston Churchill Range	1971	Named for an explorer/mountain guide
123	Beatrice Peak	3,119	10,233	74	243	Ball Range	1912	Named for Beatrice Shultz, a member of the FA party.
124	Redoubt Peak	3,109	10,200	169	554	Park Ranges	1927	Named for its resemblance to a redoubt.
125	Mount Babel	3,103	10,180	200	660	Bow Range	1910	
126	Mount Birdwood	3,097	10,161	735	2,411	Spray Mountains	1922	Named for a British Army officer
127	Storm Mountain	3,095	10,154	291	955	Misty Range	Unk	
128	Mount Magog	3,092	10,144	188	617	Park Ranges	1920	Named for references in the bible
129	Mount Adam Joachim	3,090	10,140	440	1,440	Winston Churchill Range	1938	
129	Tornado Mountain	3,090	10,140	950	3,120	High Rock Range	1915	
131	Bident Mountain	3,088	10,131	103	338	Bow Range	1903	Shaped like a bident
132	Majestic Mountain	3,086	10,125	1,126	3,694	Trident Range	1926	
132	Mount Richardson	3,086	10,125	922	3,025	Slate Range	1909	
132	Mount Verendrye	3,086	10,125	527	1,729	Vermilion Range	1922	
135	Mount Owen	3,083	10,115	903	2,963	Bow Range	1892	
136	Eiffel Peak	3,077	10,095	465	1,526	Bow Range	1901	
136	The Vice President	3,077	10,095	167	548	President Range	1901	Named for a VP of the Canadian Pacific Railway
138	Mount Habel	3,073	10,082	227	745	Park Ranges	1923	Named after a German geographer
139	Haddo Peak	3,070	10,070	83	272	Bow Range	1903	
139	Pinnacle Mountain	3,070	10,070	225	738	Bow Range	1909	
141	Mount Estella	3,069	10,069	179	587	Trident Range	1930	
142	Hewitt Peak	3,066	10,059	533	1,749	Vermilion Range	1906	
143	Revenant Mountain	3,065	10,056	725	2,379	Palliser Range	1968	
144	Mount Cairnes	3,060	10,040	141	463	Park Ranges	Unk	
145	Ptarmigan Peak	3,059	10,036	209	686	Slate Range	1909	
146	Mount Mangin	3,057	10,030	125	410	Park Ranges	1928	Named for a French army general
147	Fisher Peak	3,053	10,016	904	2,966	Fisher Range	1950	Named for a British admiral
147	Pika Peak	3,053	10,016	13	43	Slate Range	1909	
149	Mount Laussedat	3,052	10,013	986	3,235	Park Ranges	1906	
150	Mount Perren	3,051	10,010	113	371	Bow Range	1927	Named for a Parks Canada Warden
151	Cyclone Mountain	3,050	10,010	162	531	Park Ranges	1910	
152	Mount Carnarvon	3,046	9,993	406	1,332	President Range	1904	Named for a British politician
152	Chisel Peak	3,046	9,993	726	2,382	Park Ranges	1920	
154	Courcelette Peak	3,044	9,987	775	2,543	High Rock Range	1915	
154	Manx Peak	3,044	9,987	374	1,227	Trident Range	1919	
156	Mount Garth	3,043	9,984	103	338	Park Ranges	1934	
157	Mount Mitchell	3,040	9,970	183	600	Winston Churchill Range	1970	
157	Mount Morden Long	3,040	9,970	360	1,180	Winston Churchill Range	Unk	
159	Mount McGuire	3,030	9,940	130	430	Winston Churchill Range	1971	Named for a park warden
160	Mount Ulysses	3,024	9,921	2,289	7,510	Muskwa Ranges	1961	
161	Mount Cordonnier	3,012	9,882	177	581	Park Ranges	Unk	Named for a French army general
162	Floe Peak	3,006	9,862	436	1,430	Vermilion Range	Unk	
163	Chimney Peak	3,001	9,846	137	449	Bow Range	1910	
164	Blackhorn Peak	3,000	9,800	380	1,250	South Jasper Ranges	1926	

== Gallery ==
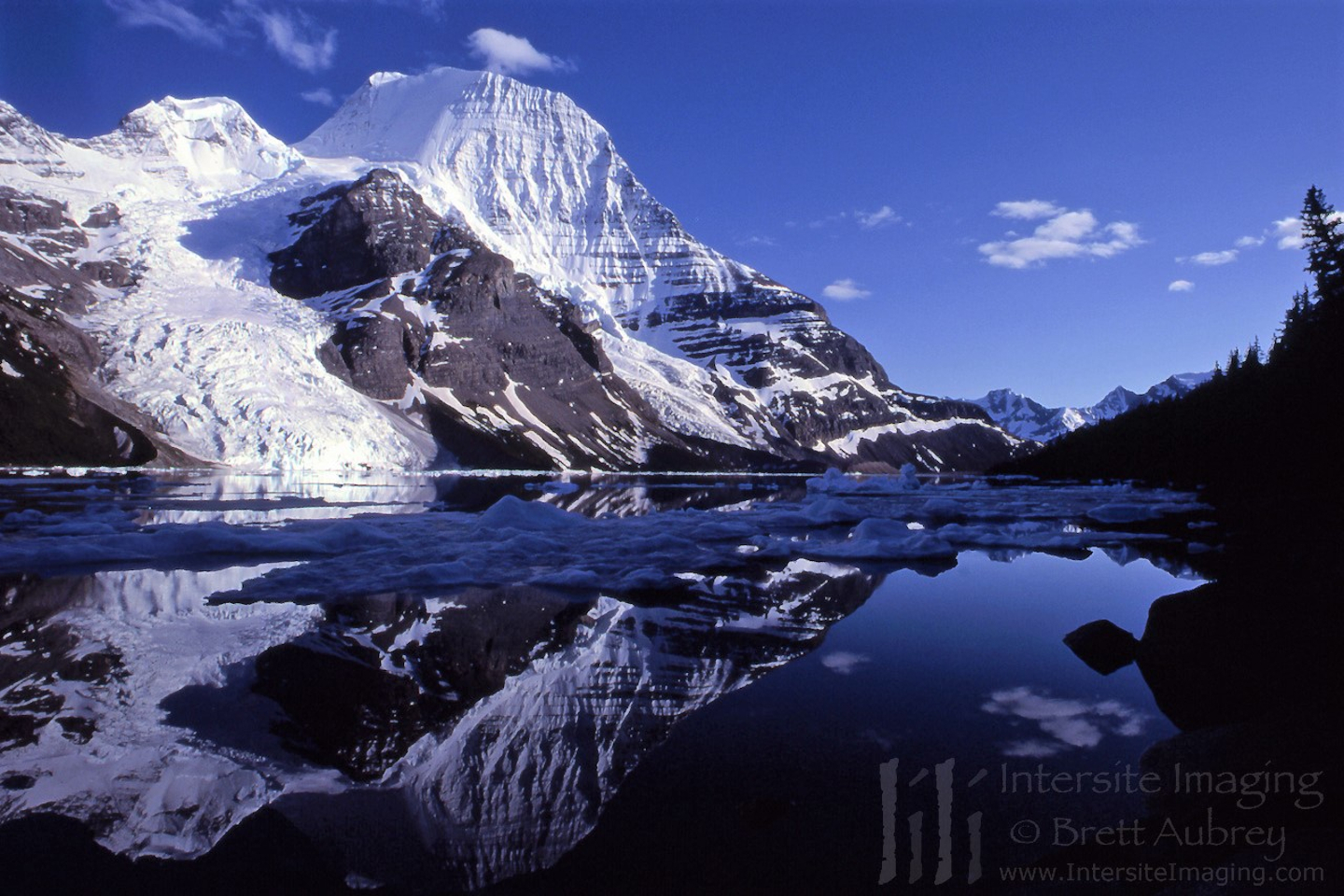
Mount Robson from Berg Lake

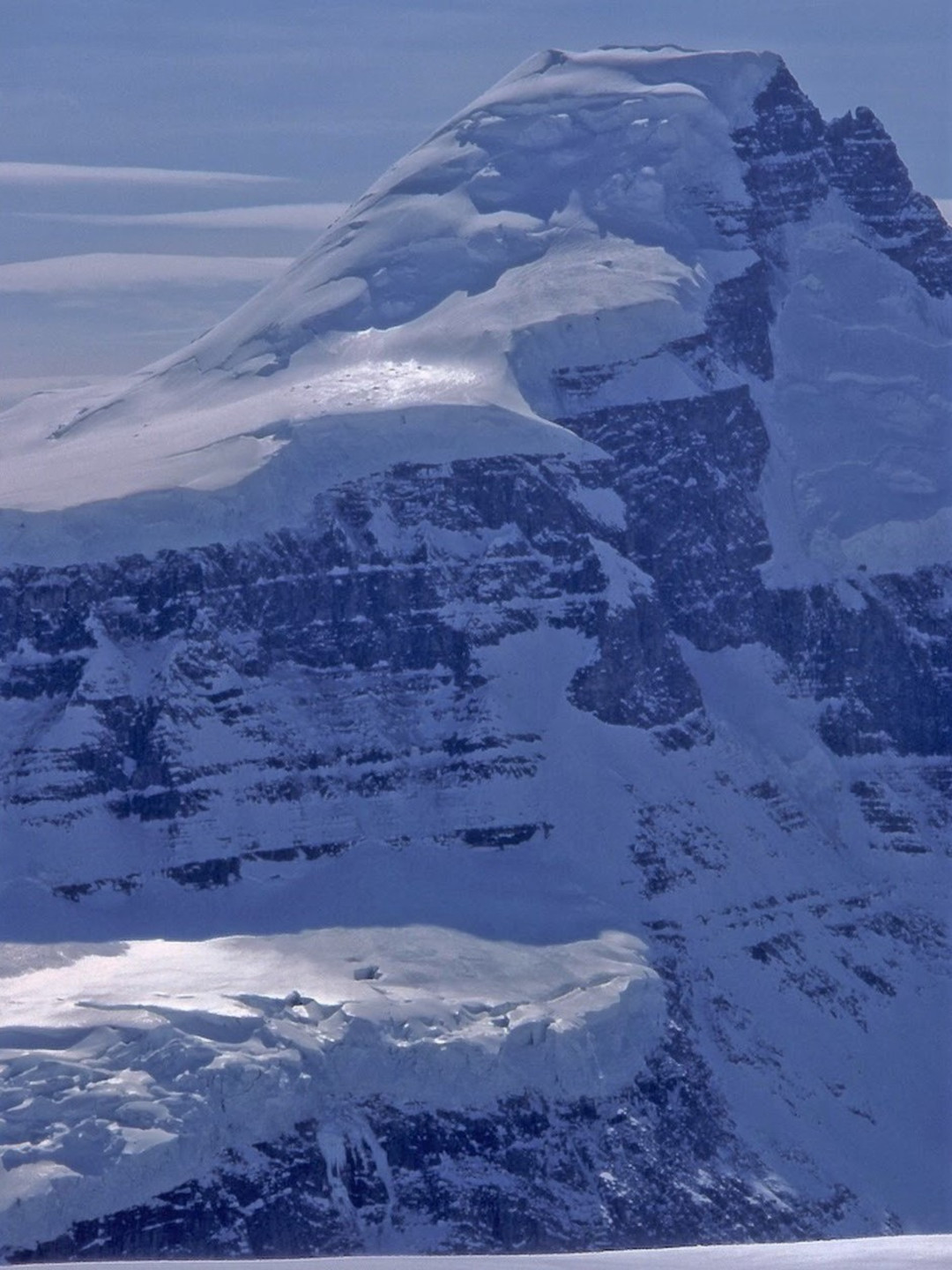
Mount Columbia

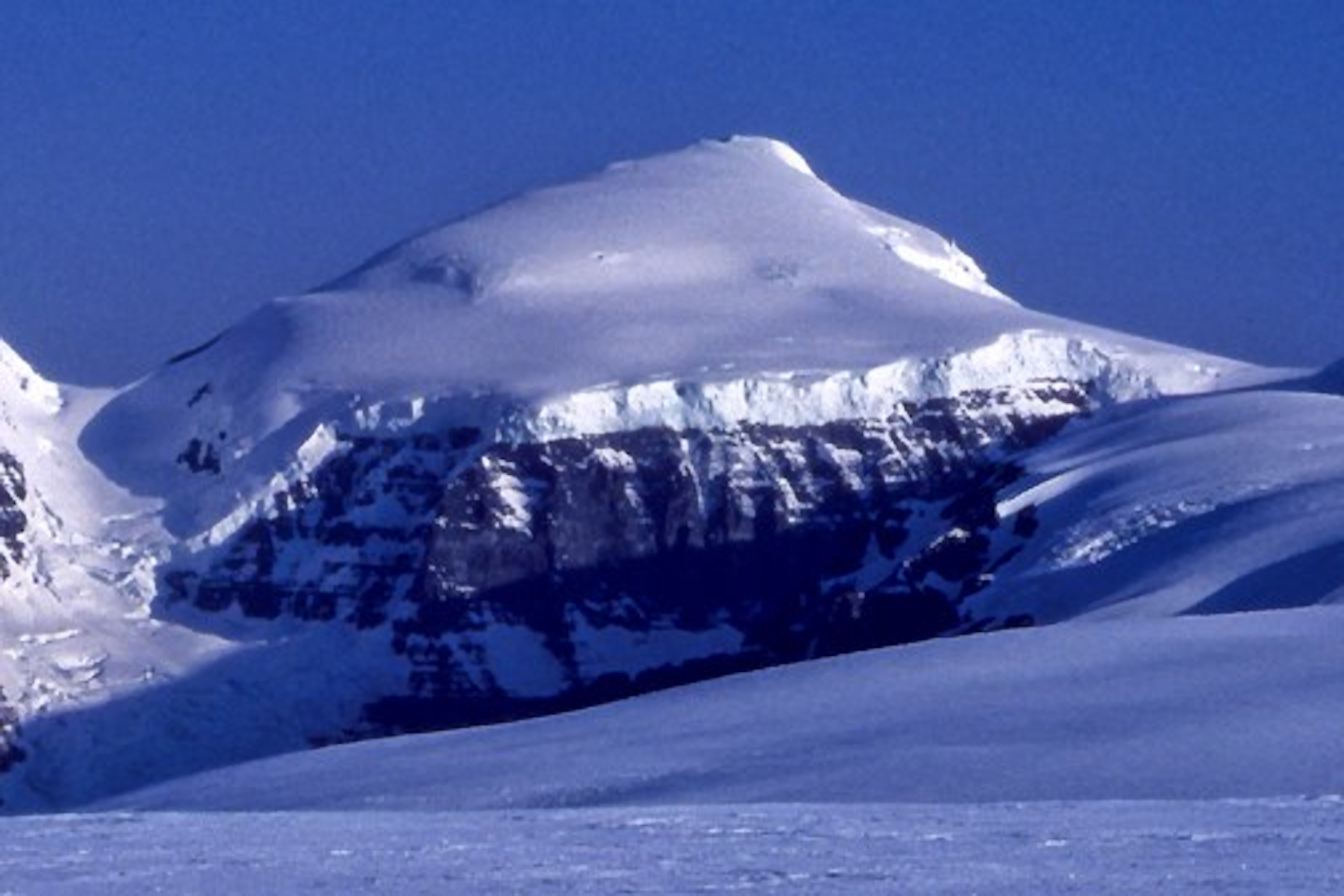
North Twin Peak
