= Mount Balinhard =

Mountain in Alberta, Canada

- Location within Alberta Location within Canada

Highest point
- Elevation: 3,130 m (10,270 ft)
- Prominence: 605 m (1,985 ft)
- Parent peak: Chivalry Peak (3175 m)
- Listing: Mountains of Alberta
- Coordinates: 52°45′37″N 117°17′58″W

Geography
- Country: Canada
- Province: Alberta
- Protected area: Jasper National Park
- Parent range: Park Ranges
- Topo map: NTS 83C14 Mountain Park

Climbing
- First ascent: 1971 J. Carlson, R. Crampton, R. Hancock

Mount Balinhard is a summit in Alberta, Canada.

Mount Balinhard was named for a title bestowed on the Earl of Southesk.

== See also ==
- List of mountains in the Canadian Rockies
