= Cyclone Mountain =

Mountain in Alberta, Canada

- Location within Alberta

Highest point
- Elevation: 3,050 m (10,010 ft)
- Prominence: 162 m (531 ft)
- Listing: Mountains of Alberta
- Coordinates: 51°34′08″N 116°04′16″W

Geography
- Country: Canada
- Province: Alberta
- Protected area: Banff National Park
- Parent range: Park Ranges
- Topo map: NTS 82N9 Hector Lake

Climbing
- First ascent: 1910 J.W.A. Hickson, Edward Feuz Sr., Edward Feuz Jr.

Cyclone Mountain is a summit located south of the Drummond Glacier in Banff National Park, Alberta, Canada.

A cyclone which occurred at the time of the mountain's naming accounts for the name.

== See also ==
- List of mountains in the Canadian Rockies
