= Lunette Peak =

Mountain in Alberta/British Columbia, Canada

- Location within Alberta Location within British Columbia Location within Canada

Highest point
- Elevation: 3,428 m (11,247 ft)
- Prominence: 38 m (125 ft)
- Parent peak: Mount Assiniboine (3618 m)
- Listing: Mountains of Alberta; Mountains of British Columbia
- Coordinates: 50°51′53″N 115°38′55″W

Geography
- Country: Canada
- Provinces: Alberta and British Columbia
- Protected areas: Banff National Park; Mount Assiniboine Provincial Park
- Parent range: Park Ranges
- Topo map: NTS 82J13 Mount Assiniboine

Climbing
- First ascent: 1901 James Outram

Lunette Peak is located on the SE side of Mount Assiniboine and straddles the Continental Divide marking the Alberta-British Columbia border. It was named in 1913 by the Interprovincial Boundary Survey.

== See also ==
- List of mountains in the Canadian Rockies
- List of peaks on the Alberta–British Columbia border
