= Mount Quincy =

Mountain in Alberta, Canada

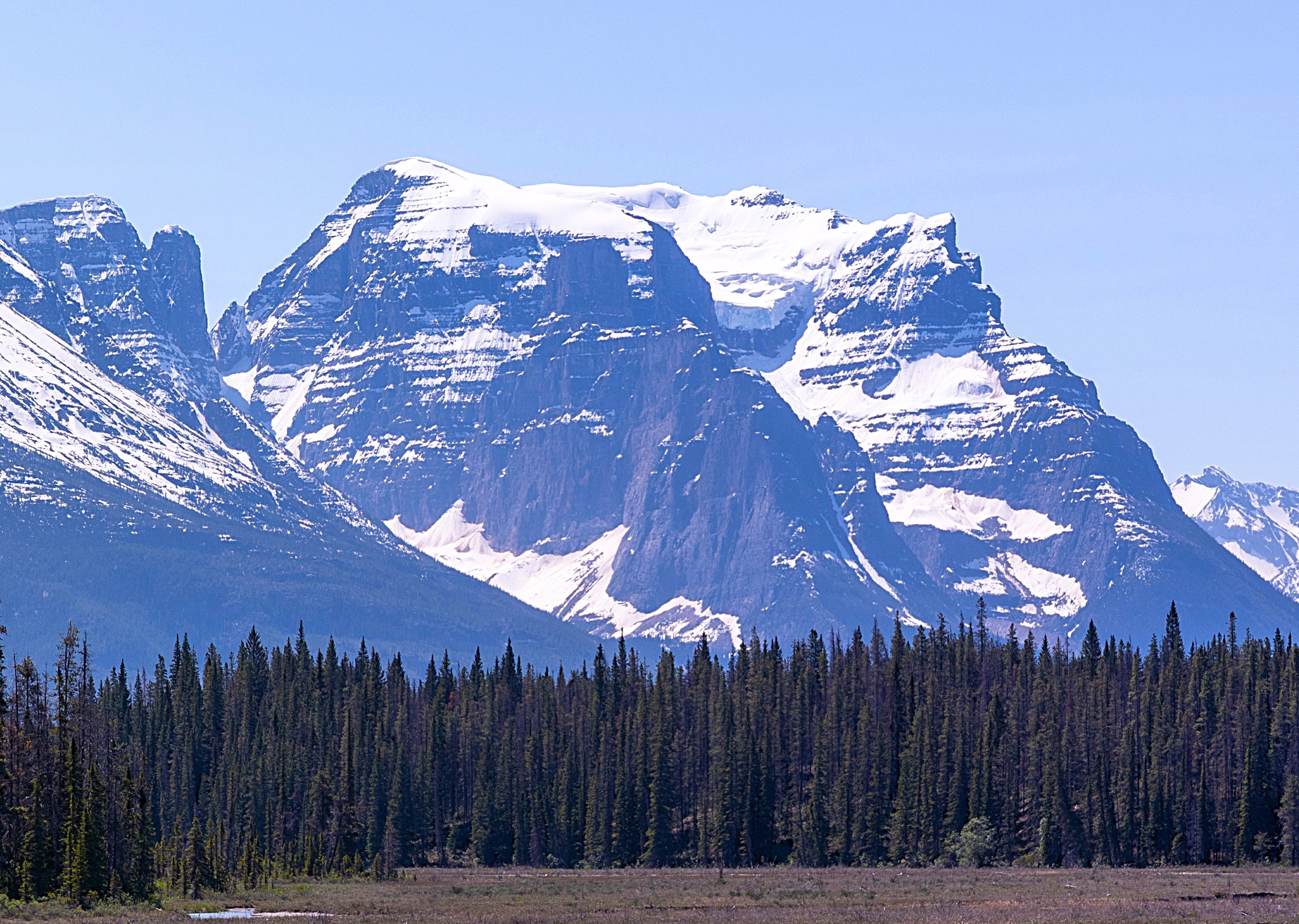
- North aspect

Highest point
- Elevation: 3,150 m (10,335 ft)
- Prominence: 508 m (1,667 ft)
- Isolation: 3.06 km (1.90 mi)
- Listing: Mountains of Alberta
- Coordinates: 52°19′45″N 117°39′47″W

Geography
- Location within Alberta Location within Canada
- Interactive map of Mount Quincy
- Country: Canada
- Province: Alberta
- Protected area: Jasper National Park
- Parent range: Canadian Rockies
- Topo map: NTS 83C5 Fortress Lake

Climbing
- First ascent: 1927

Mount Quincy is a mountain in Alberta, Canada.

== Description ==
Mount Quincy is a 3,150-metre (10,335-foot) summit located at the head of the upper Athabasca River valley in the Canadian Rockies. It is situated within Jasper National Park, 70 kilometres (43.5 miles) south-southeast of the town of Jasper, and five kilometres (3.1 miles) east of the Continental Divide of the Americas. Precipitation runoff from the mountain drains into tributaries of the Chaba and Athabasca rivers. Topographic relief is significant as the summit rises 1,750 metres (5,741 ft) above the Chaba Valley in four kilometres (2.5 miles), and 1,750 meters above the Athabasca River in six kilometres (3.7 miles). The mountain can be seen from the Icefields Parkway, weather permitting. The nearest higher neighbor is Blackfriars Peak, 3.06 km (1.90 mi) to the east.

== History ==
The mountain was named in 1892 by Canadian geologist Arthur Coleman after his brother, Lucius Quincy Coleman (1854–1935), who ranched in the Bow Valley and outfitted Arthur's 1892 and 1893 expeditions into the mountains. The first ascent of the summit was made in 1927 by Alfred Ostheimer along with guide Hans Fuhrer. The mountain's toponym was officially adopted on October 7, 1986, by the Geographical Names Board of Canada.

== Climate ==
Based on the Köppen climate classification, Mount Quincy is located in a subarctic climate zone with cold, snowy winters, and mild summers. Winter temperatures can drop below -20 °C with wind chill factors below -30 °C. This climate supports unnamed glaciers on the slopes of the peak.

== Geology ==
The mountain is composed of sedimentary rock laid down during the Precambrian to Jurassic periods and pushed east and over the top of younger rock during the Laramide orogeny.

== Gallery ==
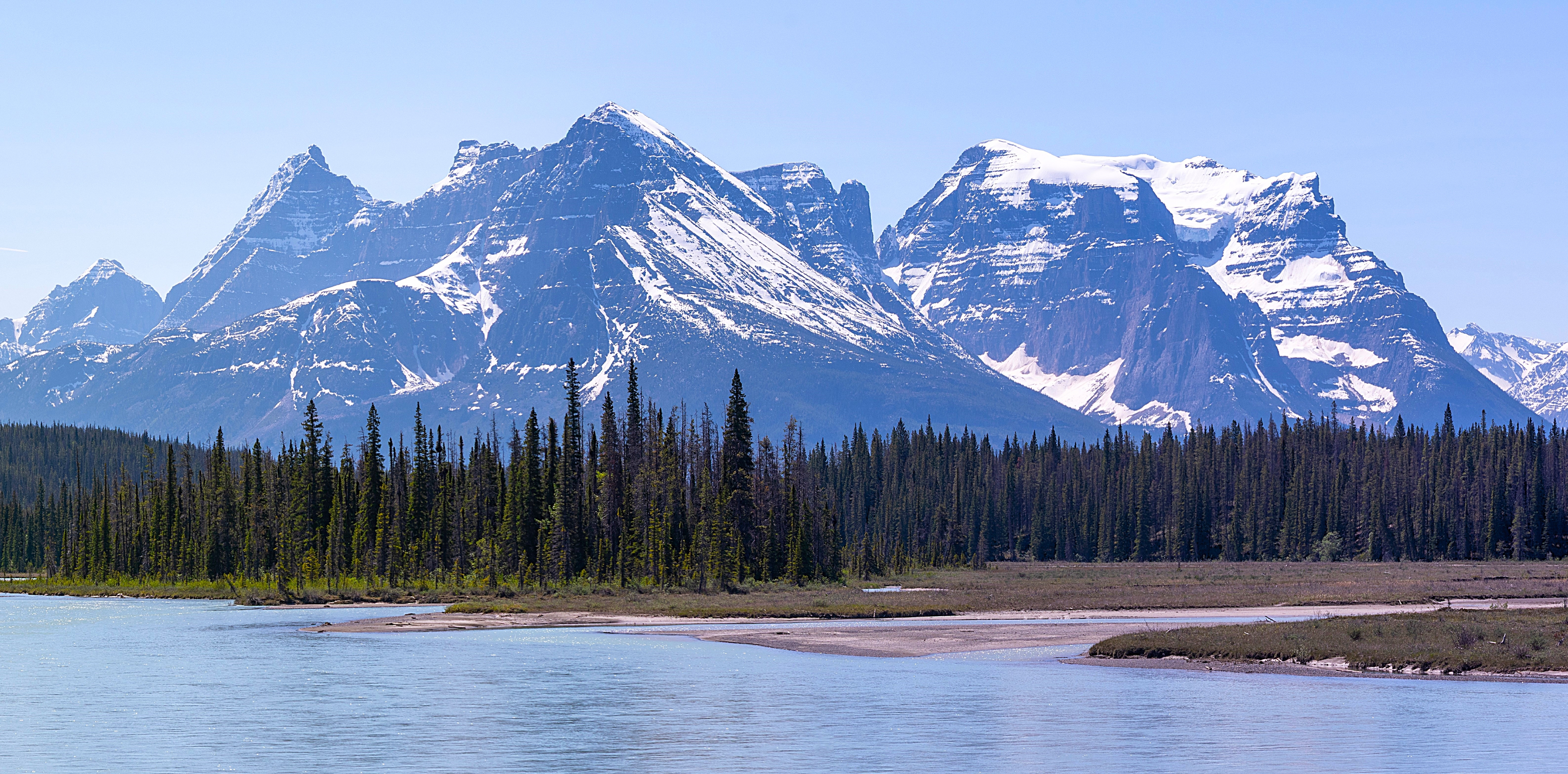
Blackfriars Peak (left) and Mount Quincy (right).
Athabasca River in foreground.

== See also ==
- Geography of Alberta
- Geology of the Rocky Mountains
- List of mountains in the Canadian Rockies
