= Mount Freshfield =

Mountain in Canada

- Location within Alberta Location within British Columbia Location within Canada

Highest point
- Elevation: 3,337 m (10,948 ft) (Note: Other sources give 3336 m)
- Prominence: 477 m (1,565 ft)
- Parent peak: Mount Barnard (3340 m)
- Listing: Mountains of Alberta; Mountains of British Columbia
- Coordinates: 51°44′34″N 116°56′45″W

Geography
- Country: Canada
- Provinces: Alberta and British Columbia
- Protected area: Banff National Park
- Parent range: Park Ranges
- Topo map: NTS 82N10 Blaeberry River

Climbing
- First ascent: 1902 J. Norman Collie; James Outram; H.E.M. Stutfield; G.M. Weed; H. Woolley; C. Kaufmann; Hans Kaufmann

Mount Freshfield straddles the Continental Divide marking the Alberta-British Columbia border in Canada. It was named in 1897 by J. Norman Collie after Douglas Freshfield.

== See also ==
- List of peaks on the Alberta–British Columbia border
