= Aimé Laussedat =

French cartographer and photographer, "father of photogrammetry"

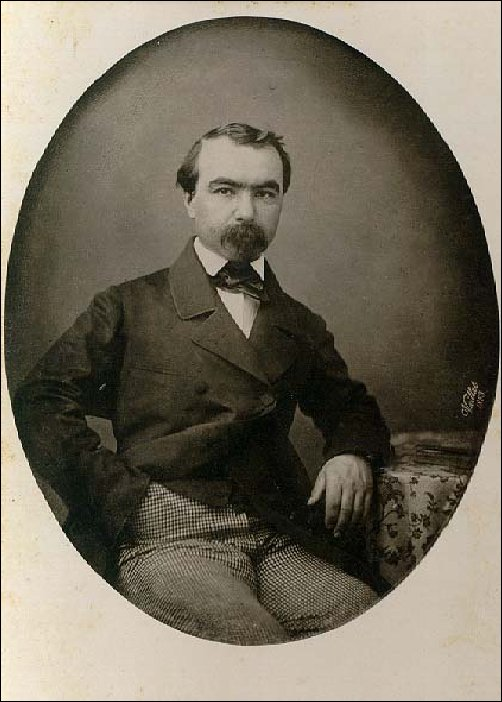
- Born: April 19, 1819; Moulins, France
- Died: March 19, 1907 (aged 87); Paris, France
- Known for: father of photogrammetry
- Scientific career
- Fields: astronomy geodesy cartography

Aimé Laussedat (April 19, 1819 – March 19, 1907) was a French scientist, more specifically, an observational astronomer, geodesist, surveyor, photogrammetrist, and cartographer.

== Biography ==
Laussedat was born in Moulins on April 19, 1819. He was an engineer, researcher and professor at the École polytechnique, then eminent manager at the National Conservatory of Arts and Crafts. He was a military engineer at the beginning of his career. He is considered the father of photogrammetry. He died on March 19, 1907 (at the age of 87), in Paris.

== Namesakes ==
- Mount Laussedat
- Laussedat Heights
- The Colonel

== See also ==
- Carlos Ibáñez e Ibáñez de Ibero – 1st president of the International Committee for Weights and Measures and president of the International Geodetic Association
