= Mount Barlow =

Mountain on Alberta/British Columbia border in Canada

- Location within Alberta Location within British Columbia Location within Canada

Highest point
- Elevation: 3,143 m (10,312 ft) (Note: Other sources state 3120 m.)
- Prominence: 203 m (666 ft)
- Listing: Mountains of Alberta; Mountains of British Columbia
- Coordinates: 51°42′18″N 116°48′38″W

Geography
- Country: Canada
- Provinces: Alberta and British Columbia
- Protected area: Banff National Park
- Parent range: Park Ranges
- Topo map: NTS 82N10 Blaeberry River

Climbing
- First ascent: 1930 by O.E. Cromwell, J. Monroe. Thorington, P. Kaufmann

Mount Barlow is located on the Continental Divide along the border of Alberta and British Columbia at the southern edge of the Freshfield Icefield in Banff National Park. It was named in 1916 by D.B. Dowling after Dr. Alfred Ernest Barlow, a cartographer with the Geological Survey of Canada who died in the 1914 Empress of Ireland disaster.

== See also ==
- List of peaks on the Alberta–British Columbia border
- List of mountains in the Canadian Rockies
