= Canadian Rocky Mountain Parks World Heritage Site =

Group of national and provincial parks in Canada

Canadian Rocky Mountain Parks
- Map of the Canadian Rocky Mountain parks

- Location within Canada Location within North America
- 51°25′29″N 116°28′47″W
- Location: Canada

Site notes
- Governing body: Parks Canada and BC Parks

UNESCO World Heritage Site
- Type: Natural
- Criteria: vii, viii
- Designated: 1984 (8th session)
- Reference no.: 304
- Region: Europe and North America

The Canadian Rocky Mountain Parks World Heritage Site consists of seven contiguous parks including four national parks (Banff, Jasper, Kootenay, and Yoho) and three British Columbia provincial parks (Hamber, Mount Assiniboine, and Mount Robson).

These seven parks in the Canadian Rockies include mountains, glaciers, and hot springs and the headwaters of major North American river systems including the North Saskatchewan, Athabasca, Columbia, and Fraser rivers.

The area is known for its natural environment and biological diversity. It includes the Burgess Shale site, a World Heritage Site in its own right from 1980 to 1984, when it was included in the Canadian Rocky Mountain Parks WHS designation.

== World Heritage Site ==
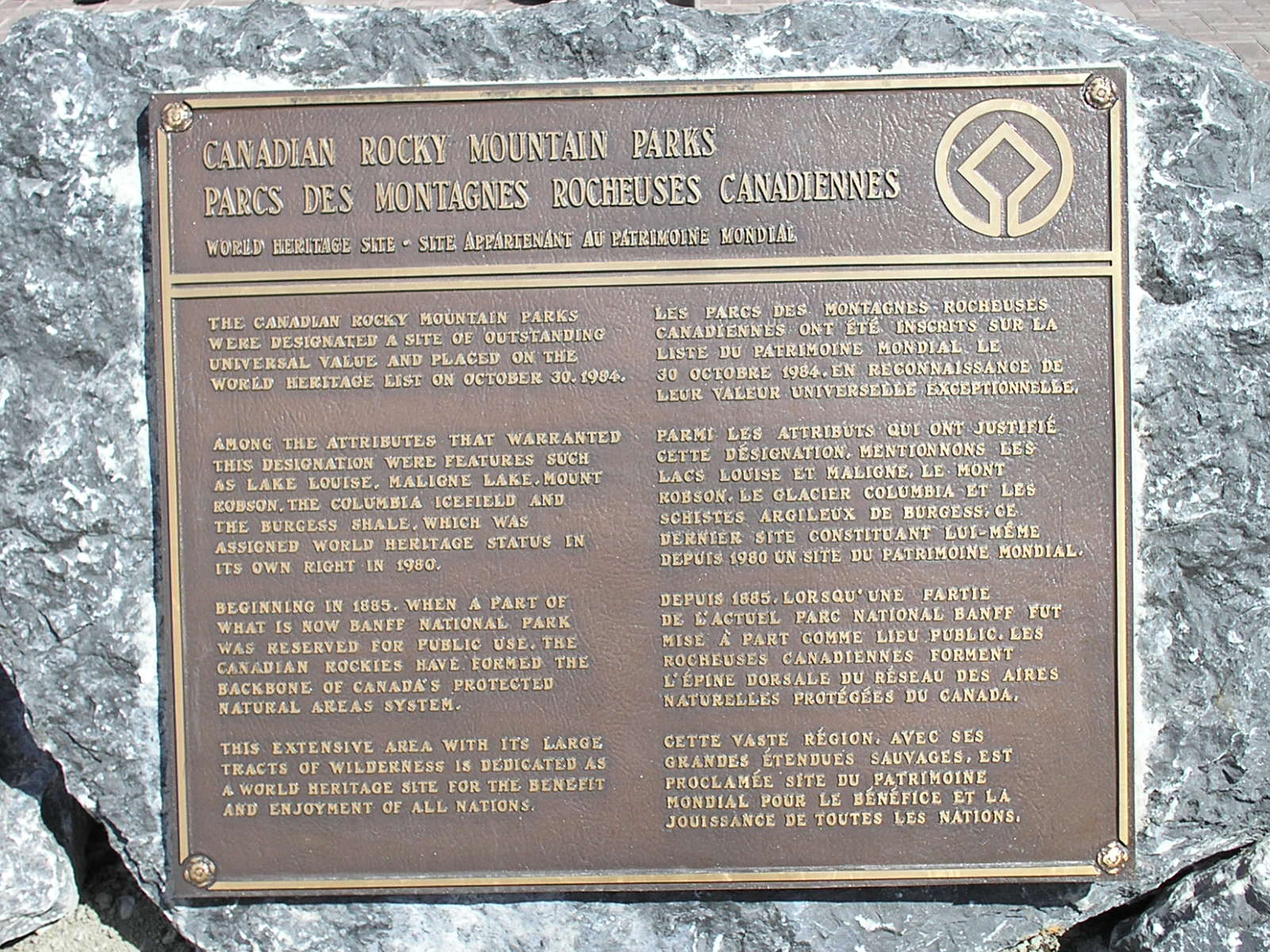
Commemorative plate

In 1983 Canada nominated Banff, Jasper, Kootenay and Yoho national parks for inclusion on the UNESCO list of World Heritage Sites. UNESCO accepted this nomination in 1984 on the basis of a recommendation by International Union for Conservation of Nature (IUCN).

The original nomination and IUCN's recommendation drew attention to the area's "exceptional natural beauty", "habitats of rare and endangered species" and its natural landforms such as mountain peaks, glaciers, lakes, canyons, limestone caves, and the unique Burgess Shale fossils. That year the UNESCO World Heritage Committee "requested the Canadian authorities to consider adding the adjacent Provincial Parks of Mount Robson, Hamber, Mount Assiniboine and Kananaskis" to the Canadian Rocky Mountain Parks site.

At a 1990 meeting, "the Committee welcomed the Canadian proposal to include, in the Rocky Mountains Parks site, Mount Robson, Hamber and Assiniboine Provincial Parks, following its request at its Eighth Session in 1984." Kananaskis (renamed Peter Lougheed Provincial Park) has not been included within the Canadian Rocky Mountain Parks World Heritage site.

== See also ==
- List of National Parks of Canada
- List of World Heritage Sites in the Americas
- List of British Columbia provincial parks
- List of protected areas of Alberta
