= Wood River (British Columbia) =

Canadian river

Coordinates: 52°13′01″N 118°10′54″W

The Wood River, which flows in a southwesterly direction, is in the East Kootenay region of southeastern British Columbia. The former confluence was near the top of the Big Bend of the Columbia River. After the enlarged Kinbasket Lake formed the Mica Dam reservoir, the flow entered Wood Arm.

== Name origin ==
In their respective journals, the waterway was called Flat Heart River by David Thompson (1811) (reflecting his men's timidity), Little Canoe River by Gabriel Franchère (1814) (adjacent to Canoe River mouth), and Portage River by Alexander Ross (1824) (largely unnavigable).

In 1874, Sandford Fleming referred to the valley of Portage or Wood River.

The name origin is unclear but may have indicated that the woodlands rather than the river provided the means of traversing this section.

== Course ==
The Wood River leaves the southwest corner of Fortress Lake, which lies west of the Continental Divide in Hamber Provincial Park. Significant tributaries over the first 25 kilometres (16 mi) or so are Alnus Creek, Serenity Creek, Ghost Creek, Clemenceau Creek, Pacific Creek, and Jeffrey Creek. This section includes swampy land, gravel flats, and steep falls. The next section down to Boat Encampment was about 31 kilometres (19 mi).. Not even the lower part of the river was navigable by steamboats. Jumping Jack Creek flows into Wood Arm.

== Trails ==
The Athabasca trail northeastward from Boat Encampment comprised Wood River, Jeffrey Creek, Pacific Creek, Committee's Punch Bowl, Athabasca Pass, Whirlpool River, Athabasca River, Brûlé Lake, and terminated at Jasper House (first location). Gradually, the eastern terminus moved westward, having a final location in the vicinity of Henry House.

Wood Arm has submerged about 20 kilometres (12 mi) of the original route from Boat Encampment. The present trail to Jeffrey Creek comprises swamp or flooded woodland, which mirrors the difficulties faced by the early explorers. The other option has been to walk in the fast, deep current of the river between each gravel bar.

Franchère mentioned the slow and exhausting progress after diverting farther into the woods to make headway. Ross counted the 62 streams he crossed one day. In the 1840s, Paul Kane explained the difficulty of extracting his horse which was stuck in a mud hole up to its head.

== Maps ==
- David Thompson's 1811 route.
- "Kootenay map". library.ubc.ca. 1899. p. 1.
- "Gousha BC road map". www.cartweb.geography.ua.edu. 1958.
- Wood River map (present).

== See also ==
- List of rivers of British Columbia
- List of tributaries of the Columbia River
