= Mount Woolley =

Mountain in Alberta, Canada

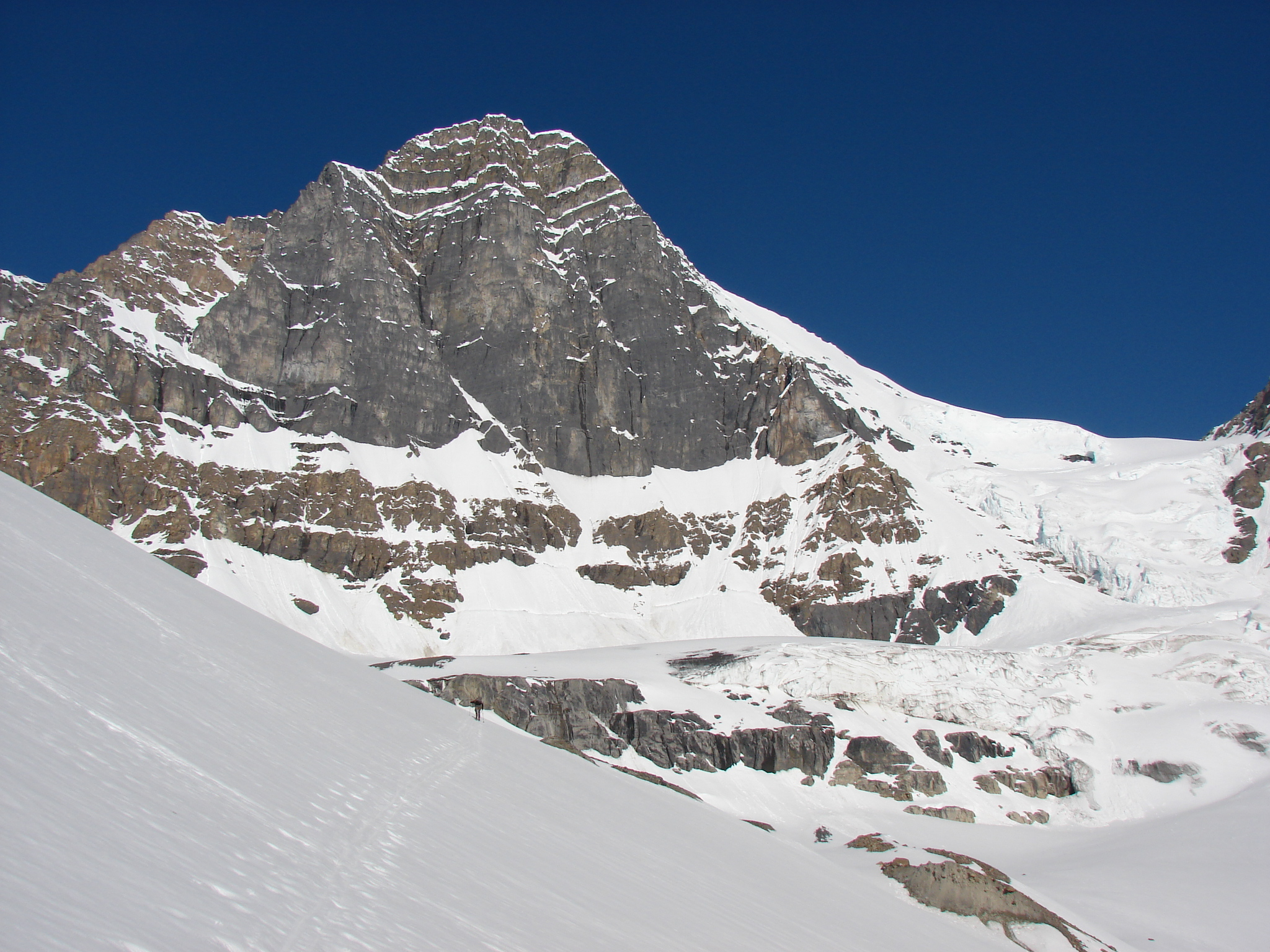
- East face of Wooley

Highest point
- Elevation: 3,405 m (11,171 ft)
- Prominence: 565 m (1,854 ft)
- Parent peak: Mount Alberta (3619 m)
- Listing: Mountains of Alberta
- Coordinates: 52°17′50″N 117°25′31″W

Geography
- Location within Alberta Location within Canada
- Country: Canada
- Province: Alberta
- Protected area: Jasper National Park
- Parent range: Winston Churchill Range
- Topo map: NTS 83C6 Sunwapta Peak

Climbing
- First ascent: July 28,1925, by a Japanese team (Six Japanese men including Yūkō Maki and three men from Switzerland)
- Easiest route: Rock/snow climb

Mount Woolley is a mountain in Alberta, Canada, located in the Sunwapta River Valley of Jasper National Park, 1½ km south of Diadem Peak and is part of Winston Churchill Range of the Canadian Rockies.

== History ==
The mountain was named in 1898 by J. Norman Collie after Herman Woolley. Woolley, a former football player, climbed extensively with Collie during his 1898 and 1902 expeditions into the Canadian Rockies.

The mountain's first ascent was made in 1925 by a group of climbers from the Japanese Alpine Club. They were headed by Yūkō Maki, who four years earlier had made the first ascent of the Eiger's Mittellegi Ridge. The other Japanese team members were T. Hayakawa, Y.Mita, S. Hashimoto, H. Hatano and N. Okabe. Two Swiss guides, Heinrich Fuhrer (Note: It has been written that Heinrich Fuhrer "is not to be confused with another Heinrich Fuhrer, the brother of Hans Fuhrer, who guided in the Jasper area only a few years later". A contemporary account provides further conformation by stating that "they engaged Heinrich Fuhrer, the brother of Ulrich of Finsteraarhorn fame, and Hans Kohler, the son of the well-known Niklaus Kohler of Meiringen" and "Mr. Maki and his party embarked for Japan and, later, the Swiss members returned to Europe.") and Hans Kohler guided the party, Jean Weber, an amateur Swiss mountaineer who also happened to be in Jasper at the time acted as assistant guide. A few days earlier the same group had made the first ascent of Mount Alberta.

== Geology ==
Mount Woolley is composed of sedimentary rock laid down from the Precambrian to Jurassic periods. Formed in shallow seas, this sedimentary rock was pushed east and over the top of younger rock during the Laramide orogeny.

== Climate ==
Based on the Köppen climate classification, Mount Woolley is located in a subarctic climate zone with cold, snowy winters, and mild summers. Temperatures can drop below -20 °C with wind chill factors below -30 °C.

== See also ==
- Geography of Alberta
- List of mountains of Canada
