= Chaba River (China) =

River in Chongqing, China

Chaba River is a river in the area of Chongqing Municipality, China.
