= Mount Alexandra (Canada) =

Mountain in Banff NP, Alberta/British Columbia, Canada

- Location within Alberta Location within British Columbia Location within Canada

Highest point
- Elevation: 3,401 m (11,158 ft)
- Prominence: 421 m (1,381 ft)
- Parent peak: Mount Lyell (3498 m)
- Listing: Mountains of Alberta; Mountains of British Columbia
- Coordinates: 51°58′51″N 117°11′54″W

Geography
- Country: Canada
- Provinces: Alberta and British Columbia
- Protected area: Banff National Park
- Parent range: Park Ranges
- Topo map: NTS 82N14 Rostrum Peak

Geology
- Rock type: Sedimentary

Climbing
- First ascent: 1902 James Outram, Christian Kaufmann

Mount Alexandra is a remote 3,401-metre (11,158-foot) mountain summit on the border of British Columbia and Alberta, Canada.

The first ascent of the mountain was made in 1902 by James Outram with guide Christian Kaufmann. Mount Alexandra was named in 1902 by James Outram for Alexandra of Denmark.

== Geology ==
Like other mountains in Banff National Park, Mount Alexandra is composed of sedimentary rock laid down from the Precambrian to Jurassic periods. Formed in shallow seas, this sedimentary rock was pushed east and over the top of younger rock during the Laramide orogeny.

== Climate ==
Based on the Köppen climate classification, Mount Alexandra is located in a subarctic climate zone with cold, snowy winters, and mild summers. Temperatures can drop below -20 °C with wind chill factors below -30 °C.
