= Apex Mountain (Chaba Icefield) =

Mountain in Alberta/British Columbia, Canada

- Location within Alberta Location within British Columbia Location within Canada

Highest point
- Elevation: 3,250 m (10,660 ft) (Note: Other sources give 3246 m)
- Prominence: 510 m (1,670 ft)
- Listing: Mountains of Alberta; Mountains of British Columbia
- Coordinates: 52°13′22″N 117°48′48″W

Geography
- Country: Canada
- Provinces: Alberta and British Columbia
- District: Kootenay Land District
- Parent range: Park Ranges
- Topo map: NTS 83C4 Clemenceau Icefield

Climbing
- First ascent: 1922 by A. Carpe, H.S. Hall

Apex Mountain is located on the Canadian provincial boundary between Alberta and British Columbia. It was named in 1927 and is located in the centre of the Clemenceau Icefield.

== Geology ==
Apex Mountain is composed of sedimentary rock laid down during the Precambrian to Jurassic periods. Formed in shallow seas, this sedimentary rock was pushed east and over the top of younger rock during the Laramide orogeny.

== Climate ==
Based on the Köppen climate classification, Apex Mountain is located in a subarctic climate with cold, snowy winters, and mild summers. Temperatures can drop below −20 °C with wind chill factors below −30 °C.

== See also ==
- List of peaks on the Alberta–British Columbia border
- List of mountains in the Canadian Rockies
