= Chaba River (Canada) =

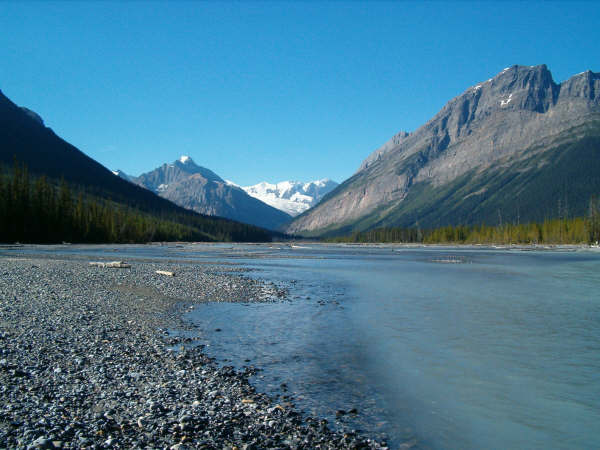
- Chaba River and Chaba Icefield

Location
- Country: Canada
- Province: Alberta

Physical characteristics
- Source
  - location: Chaba Icefield
  - coordinates: 52°14′49″N 117°40′52″W
  - elevation: 1,597 m (5,240 ft)
- Mouth
  - location: Athabasca River
  - coordinates: 52°25′05″N 117°39′38″W
  - elevation: 1,380 m (4,530 ft)

The Chaba River is a short river in western Alberta, Canada. It flows from the Canadian Rockies, and joins the Athabasca River.

The Chaba River is a major tributary of the Athabasca. The Chaba is fed by the glacial melt originating in the Chaba Icefield, comprising Chaba Peak, as well as Listening and Sundial Peaks. A small glacier on Mount Quincy also contributes to the Chaba. The river was given its name by A. P. Coleman, a geologist born in Eastern Canada in 1852. He stated there "were endless beaver dams and trees" along the river, and named it after the Stoney Indian word for beavers."

== See also ==
- List of Alberta rivers
