= Cummins Lakes Provincial Park and Protected Area =

Provincial park in British Columbia, Canada

- IUCN category II (national park)
- Location within British Columbia
- Interactive map of Cummins Lakes Provincial Park and Protected Area
- Location: Columbia-Shuswap, British Columbia, Canada
- Coordinates: 52°06′00″N 118°03′00″W
- Area: 21,988.5 ha (84.898 sq mi)
- Established: August 4, 2000
- Governing body: BC Parks

Cummins Lakes Provincial Park and Protected Area is a provincial park and protected area located in the eastern interior of British Columbia, Canada. It was established on August 4, 2000, to protect mountainous wilderness along the Cummins River.

== Geography ==
The Cummins River is a tributary of the Columbia River that forms from the glacial meltwater of the Clemenceau Icefields. As the river flows down the western slope of the Continental Ranges, it forms a trio of spectacular waterfalls that cascade into and out of a pair of alpine lakes from which the park derives its name. The river continues down the valley before joining the southeastern arm of Kinbasket Reservoir.

== Ecology ==
Cummins Lakes Park protects a representative portion of the Central Park Ranges ecosection and Engelmann Spruce Subalpine Fir forest.
