= Mount Barnard (Canada) =

Mountain on the Alberta/British Columbia boundary in Canada

- Location within Alberta Location within British Columbia Location within Canada

Highest point
- Elevation: 3,340 m (10,960 ft) (Note: Other sources give 3339 m.)
- Prominence: 943 m (3,094 ft)
- Parent peak: Mount Forbes (3612 m)
- Listing: Mountains of Alberta; Mountains of British Columbia
- Coordinates: 51°42′33″N 116°55′22″W

Geography
- Country: Canada
- Provinces: Alberta and British Columbia
- Protected area: Banff National Park
- Parent range: Park Ranges
- Topo map: NTS 82N10 Blaeberry River

Climbing
- First ascent: July 14, 1922 by Howard Palmer, J. Monroe Thorington, Edward Feuz Jr.

Mount Barnard is located on the border of Alberta and British Columbia, NW of the head of Waitabit Creek and North of Golden. It is the 30th highest peak in Alberta and the 42nd highest peak in British Columbia. It was named in 1917 by boundary surveyors after Sir Francis Stillman Barnard, a Lieutenant Governor of BC during the 1910s. It should not be confused with the higher Californian peak of the same name.

== See also ==
- List of peaks on the Alberta–British Columbia border
- List of mountains in the Canadian Rockies
