= Fortress Lake (British Columbia) =

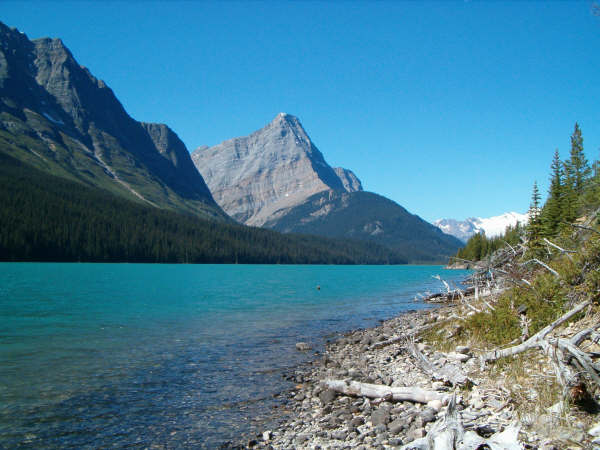
- Chisel Peak seen from Fortress Lake

- Location within British Columbia
- Location: British Columbia, Canada
- Coordinates: 52°22′11″N 117°47′24″W
- Type: Lake
- Basin countries: Canada
- Managing agency: BC Parks
- Surface elevation: 1,330 metres (4,364 ft)

Fortress Lake is a lake at the head of the Wood River in Hamber Provincial Park, British Columbia, Canada.

== See also ==
- List of lakes of British Columbia
