= Chaba Icefield =

Ice field in British Columbia, Canada

- Location within Alberta Location within British Columbia Location within Canada
- Type: Icefield
- Location: Alberta / British Columbia, Canada
- Coordinates: 52°13′N 117°45′W
- Area: 366 km^{2} (141 sq mi)
- Terminus: outflow glaciers
- Status: receding

The Chaba Icefield is an ice field located at the southern end of Hamber Provincial Park, extending into Jasper National Park and straddles the Continental Divide marking the Alberta–British Columbia border.
