= Hamber Provincial Park =

Provincial park in British Columbia, Canada

- IUCN category II (national park)
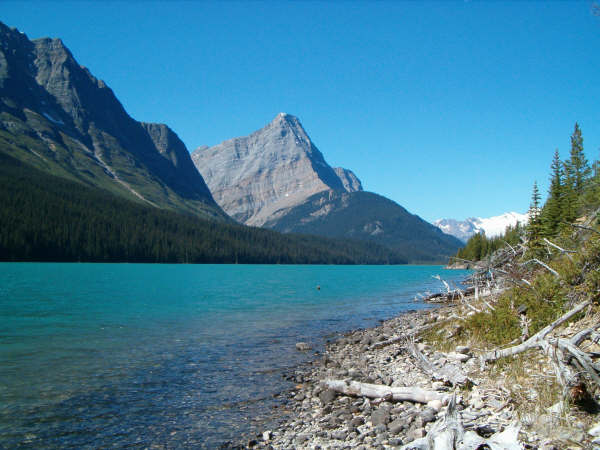
- Fortress Lake and Chisel Peak

- Location within British Columbia
- Interactive map of Hamber Provincial Park
- Location: Columbia-Shuswap RD, British Columbia, Canada
- Nearest city: Mica Creek and Jasper
- Coordinates: 52°22′05″N 117°51′59″W
- Area: 240 km^{2} (93 sq mi)
- Established: September 16, 1941
- Governing body: BC Parks
- Website: bcparks.ca/explore/parkpgs/hamber/

UNESCO World Heritage Site
- Part of: Canadian Rocky Mountain Parks
- Criteria: Natural: (vii), (viii)
- Reference: 304
- Inscription: 1990 (14th Session)

Hamber Provincial Park is a provincial park in British Columbia, Canada, located 130 kilometres (80.7 mi) north of Golden. Straddling the Great Divide on the provincial boundary with Alberta, the park is surrounded on three sides by Jasper National Park and protects the headwaters of the Wood River at Fortress Lake.

When the park was created in 1941, it constituted one of the largest protected wilderness areas in Canada. In the early 1960s, the provincial government reduced its size by 98% due to pressure exerted by the forestry industry, planned hydroelectric developments along the upper Columbia River and the re-routing of the Trans-Canada Highway away from the park.

== History ==
Established on 16 September 1941 by an Order in Council issued by British Columbia premier Thomas Dufferin Pattullo, the park was named in honour of Eric W. Hamber, Lieutenant-Governor of British Columbia from 1936 to 1941. Covering approximately 1,009,112 hectares at the time of its establishment, it was one of the largest parks in Canada. It shared a common boundary with portions of Mount Robson Provincial Park and Jasper, Banff, Glacier and Yoho National Parks. Designated a "Class A" provincial park, it afforded the "highest degree of protection from exploitation" to a vast tract of wilderness in the Selkirk Mountains and the western ranges of the Rocky Mountains.

Pattullo established Hamber as a new protected area which bridged the gap between several existing mountain parks in the hope that his action would spur the Canadian government to declare Hamber a new national park. He envisioned that a substantial increase in the national park system's coverage of western Canada's mountainous terrain would boost tourism revenue. Part of this economic benefit was anticipated to derive from improved access to the region made possible by federal support for road infrastructure within a nationalized Hamber park. The Canadian federal government, whose attention was directed towards World War II, expressed little interest in Pattullo's idea. Moreover, Prime Minister Mackenzie King preferred that national parks be spread throughout the country and not be concentrated only in the mountains of western Canada. No portion of Hamber was ever incorporated into Canada's national park system.

Within the park's protected boundaries were extensive stands of commercially valuable timber. Sawmills and logging companies based in Revelstoke and Golden lobbied the provincial government to allow exploitation of Hamber's timber resources. They argued that Hamber's existence as a protected area was stifling the region's forestry-based economy. The provincial government redesignated Hamber as a "Class B" provincial park in 1945. Commercial logging and mining were permitted in parks given this designation.

Hamber remained undeveloped throughout the 1940s and 1950s. No tourist resorts, campgrounds, trails or scenic lookouts were constructed within the park even though a considerable section of the highway which in 1962 would be officially designated the Trans-Canada passed through it. By the late 1950s it had become clear through negotiations with the United States which would ultimately lead to the Columbia River Treaty that hydroelectric dam projects would be constructed along the upper Columbia River. One of these planned projects, Mica Dam, would result in substantial environmental disruptions within the park's boundaries caused by the flooding of the Columbia River valley above the dam. Because the highway followed this valley between Revelstoke and Golden, it had to be re-routed through Rogers Pass before the dam could be built and thereby bypassed Hamber almost entirely. In light of these circumstances, provincial officials concluded that the park no longer had a legitimate reason to exist in its current form. In 1961 and 1962 the British Columbia government redrew the park's boundaries. Most of the park was deleted, except for a rump centered on Fortress Lake in a remote part of the western ranges of the Rocky Mountains. The new Hamber Provincial Park consists of only 24,518 hectares, a reduction of 98% relative to its original size.

=== World Heritage Site ===
In 1990 this park was included within the Canadian Rocky Mountain Parks UNESCO World Heritage Site. Together with the other national and provincial parks that comprise the Canadian Rocky Mountain Parks, the park was recognized for its natural environment and the geological and ecological significance of its mountain landscapes containing the habitats of rare and endangered species, mountain peaks, glaciers, lakes, waterfalls, canyons and limestone caves and fossils.

== Conservation and recreation ==
As a remote wilderness area, no roads traverse the park. A commercial fly-in fishing camp operates on Chisel Creek Fan on the shore of Fortress Lake during the summer months. The only other means of access are via hike-in or ski-in from Sunwapta Falls on the Icefields Parkway in Jasper National Park. It is a 22 km hike over trails to Fortress Lake. In the 1970s, construction began on a trail into the park from Kinbasket Lake via the Wood River by the British Columbia Forest Service. However, the trail was only completed to within 5 km of the park boundary and was abandoned.

In 2014, a bridge over the Athabasca River collapsed, severing access via the only maintained trail into the park.

Despite providing numerous recreation opportunities, lack of access prevents similar levels of hiking and camping found in other mountain parks. In addition to access to the park from Sunwapta Falls, an overgrown trail accesses two campgrounds (Fortress Creek and Washout Creek, decommissioned in August 2020) on Fortress Lake's north shore. A commercial fishing operation exists on the Chisel Creek fan, accessible by floatplane. Additionally, two small caves ranging from 15–87 m in depth exist in the upper reaches of the Alnus Creek watershed.

Vegetation around Fortress Lake is replete with spruce and balsam, consisting of a heavy understory of false azalea and rhododendron. The closest communities to the park are Valemount, British Columbia and Jasper, Alberta.

== Gallery ==
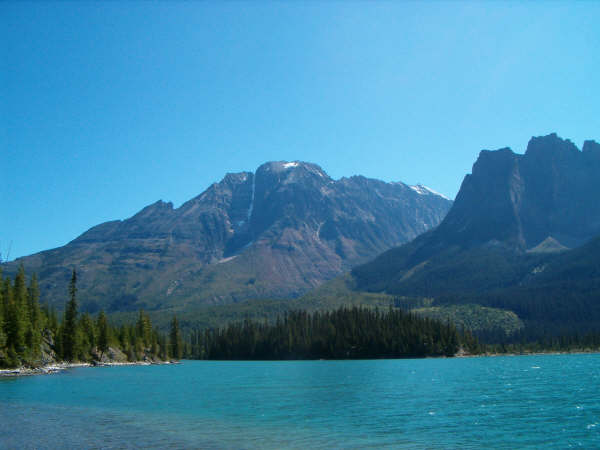
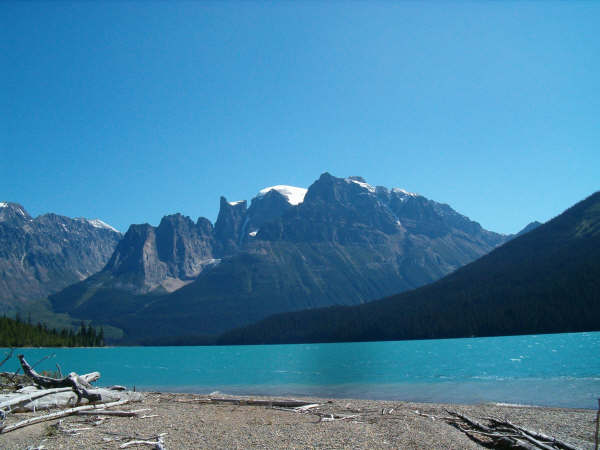
Fortress Lake in Hamber Provincial Park

== See also ==
- List of British Columbia Provincial Parks
- List of Canadian protected areas
- List of national parks of Canada
- List of World Heritage Sites in the Americas
