= Blaeberry River =

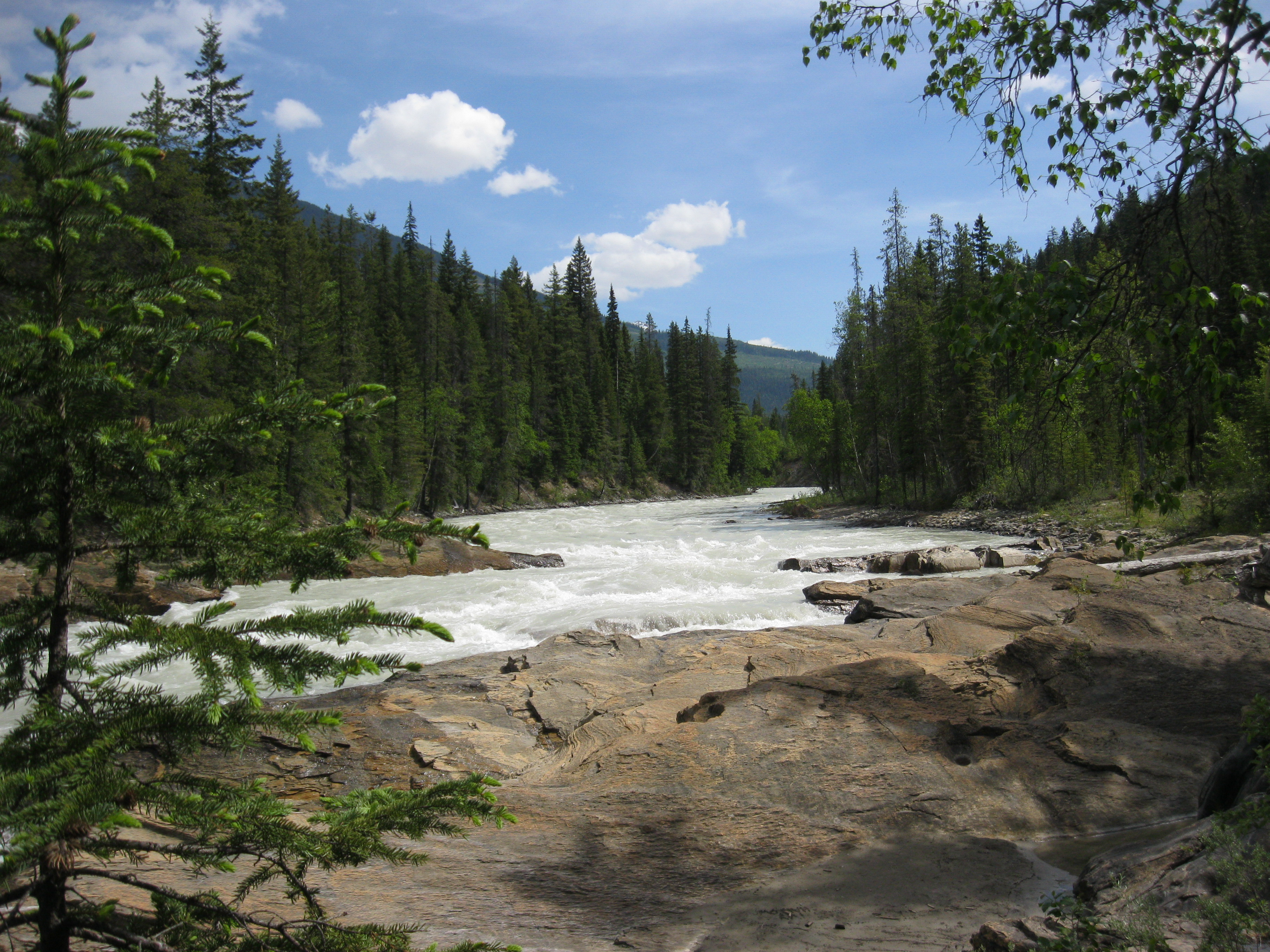
- Thompson Falls (also called Blaeberry Falls) on the Blaeberry River

Location
- Country: Canada
- Province: British Columbia
- District: Kootenay Land District

Physical characteristics
- Source: Near Howse Pass
  - location: Canadian Rockies
- Mouth: Columbia River
  - coordinates: 51°25′26″N 117°05′17″W
- Discharge
  - location: above Willowbank Creek
  - average: 16.7 m^{3}/s (590 cu ft/s)
  - minimum: 1.06 m^{3}/s (37 cu ft/s)
  - maximum: 137 m^{3}/s (4,800 cu ft/s)

The Blaeberry River is a tributary of the Columbia River in the Columbia Country of British Columbia, Canada, rising in the Canadian Rockies on the south side of Howse Pass and joining the Columbia midway between the town of Golden, at the confluence of the Kicking Horse River, and the east foot of the Rogers Pass, at the head of Kinbasket Lake and the mouth of the Beaver River. Its length is about 60 kilometres (37 mi).

Known to explorer David Thompson in 1807 as Portage Creek, in 1811 another fur company explorer, Alexander Henry the younger, named it the "Blaeberry Torrent", after the abundant berry bushes seen lining its bank (these were likely huckleberries) - "Blae" is Scots language for "blue". The river's name has sometimes been translated as Blueberry River.

Blaeberry Falls is on the lower reaches of the river, approximately 7 kilometres (4 mi) up from its confluence with the Columbia.

== Tributaries ==
- Ebon Creek
- Parapet Creek
- Wildcat Creek
- Collie Creek
- Ensign Creek
- Mummery Creek
- Martin Creek
- Split Creek
- Willowbank Creek
- Redburn Creek
- Hedberg Creek

== See also ==
- List of rivers of British Columbia
