= Park Ranges =

Subrange of the Continental Ranges in Alberta and British Columbia, Canada

- Main Ranges
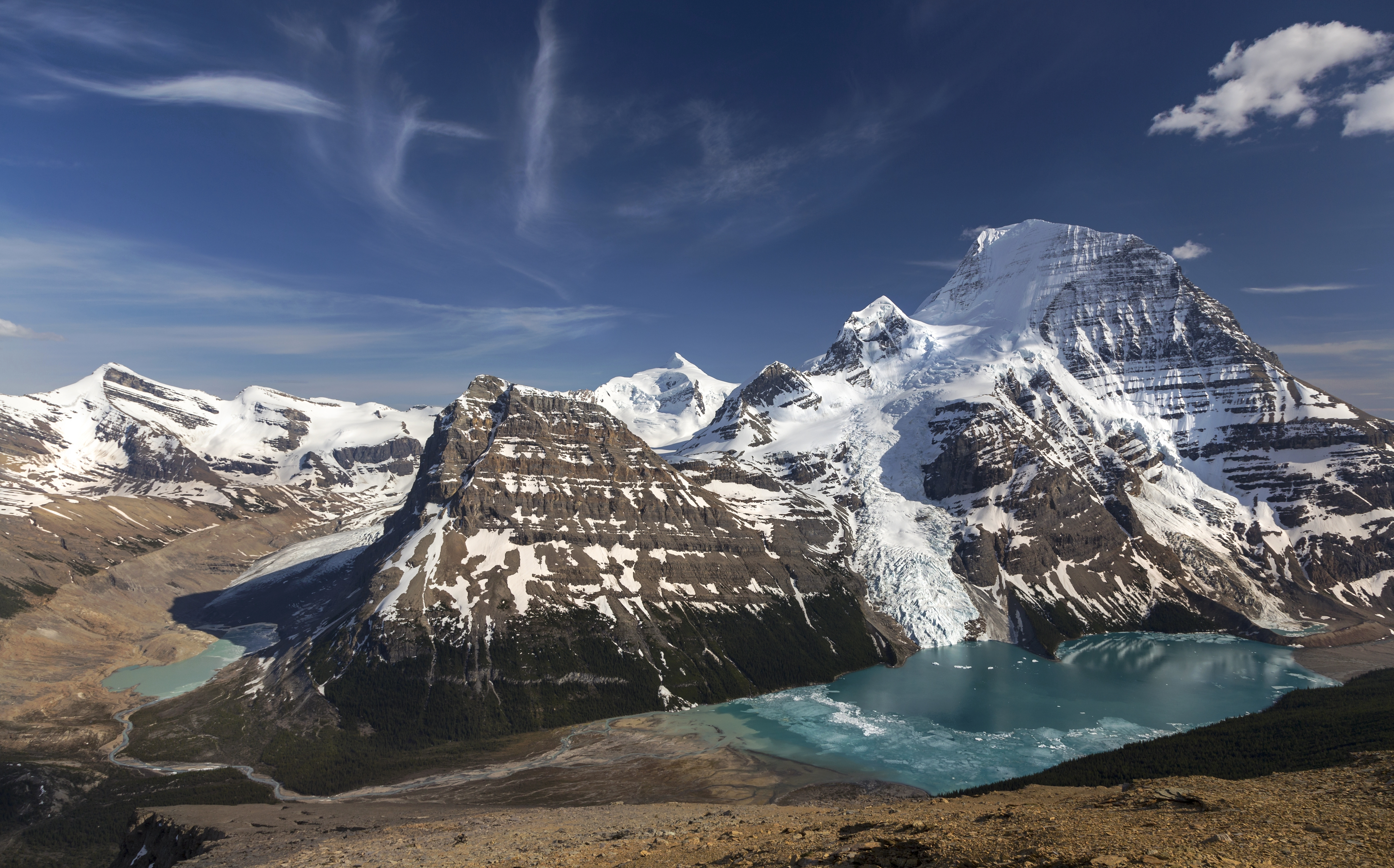
- Lynx Mountain, Rearguard Mountain, Resplendent Mountain, Mount Robson, and Berg Lake

Highest point
- Peak: Mount Robson, Rainbow Range
- Elevation: 3,954 m (12,972 ft)
- Listing: Mountains of British Columbia
- Coordinates: 53°06′38″N 119°09′23″W

Dimensions
- Area: 33,223 km^{2} (12,827 mi^{2})

Geography
- Location within Alberta Location within British Columbia Location within Canada
- Country: Canada
- Provinces: British Columbia and Alberta
- Range coordinates: 52°00′00″N 117°50′00″W
- Parent range: Continental Ranges

The Park Ranges, also known as the Main Ranges, are a group of mountain ranges in the Canadian Rockies of southeastern British Columbia and southwestern Alberta, Canada. It is one of the three main subranges and the most central of the Continental Ranges, extending from southeast of Mount McGregor to the Fernie Basin.

== Subranges ==
- Ball Range
- Blackwater Range
- Blue Range
- Bow Range
- Chaba Icefield
- Clemenceau-Chaba
- Columbia Icefield
- Drummond Group
- Freshfields
- Harrison Group
- Hooker Icefield
- Kitchen Range
- Le Grand Brazeau
- Massive Range
- McKale-Chalco Divide
- Mitchell Range
- Morkill Ranges
- Ottertail Range
- Rainbow Range
- Royal Group (mountain range)
- Selwyn Range
- Spray Mountains
- Sundance Range
- South Jasper Ranges
  - The Ramparts
  - Trident Range
- Van Horne Range
- Vermilion Range
- Wapta Icefield
- Waputik Icefield
- Waputik Mountains
  - President Range
  - Waputik Range
- Winston Churchill Range
