= Mount Pollinger =

Summit in Canada

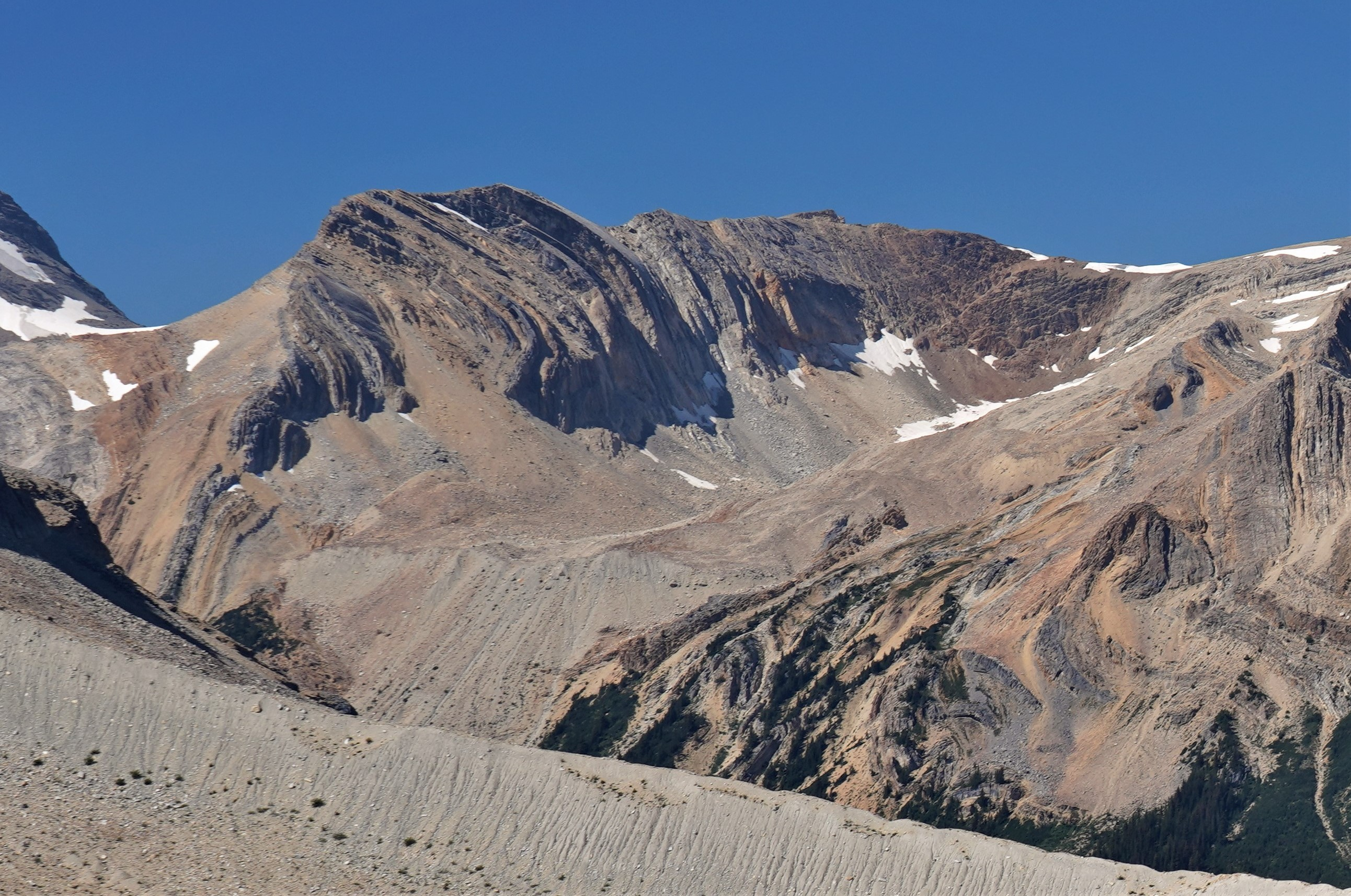
- East aspect

Highest point
- Elevation: 2,816 m (9,239 ft)
- Prominence: 49 m (161 ft)
- Parent peak: Mont des Poilus (3,161 m)
- Isolation: 1.12 km (0.70 mi)
- Listing: Mountains of British Columbia
- Coordinates: 51°31′47″N 116°35′56″W

Naming
- Etymology: Joseph (Josef) Pollinger

Geography
- Location within British Columbia Location within Canada
- Interactive map of Mount Pollinger
- Country: Canada
- Province: British Columbia
- District: Kootenay Land District
- Protected area: Yoho National Park
- Parent range: Waputik Mountains; Canadian Rockies
- Topo map: NTS 82N10 Blaeberry River

Geology
- Rock age: Cambrian
- Rock type: Sedimentary rock

Climbing
- First ascent: 1901
- Easiest route: class 2 scrambling

Mount Pollinger is a 2,816-metre (9,239-foot) summit in British Columbia, Canada.

== Description ==
Mount Pollinger is located in the northern end of Yoho National Park, in the Waputik Mountains of the Canadian Rockies. Precipitation runoff from Pollinger drains west to the Amiskwi River, and east into Little Yoho River which in turn is a tributary of the Yoho River. Mount Pollinger is more notable for its steep rise above local terrain than for its absolute elevation as topographic relief is significant with the summit rising over 1,200 meters (3,937 ft) above the Amiskwi Valley in 4.5 km (2.8 mi) and 800 meters (2,625 ft) above Little Yoho River in 2 km (1.2 mi). The Stanley Mitchell hut is 2 km (1.2 mi) east of the peak in the Little Yoho Valley, and the nearest higher neighbor is Kiwetinok Peak, 1.12 km (0.70 mi) to the southwest.

== History ==
The first ascent of the mountain was made in 1901 by James Outram with guide Christian Kaufmann.

Edward Whymper named this peak in 1901 for Joseph (Josef) Pollinger (1873–1943), an alpine guide from St. Niklaus, Switzerland, who visited Canada in 1901 with Whymper. During the short time he was in Canada, Pollinger made first ascents of Mont des Poilus, The President, The Vice President, Trolltinder Mountain, The Mitre, Mount Collie, Isolated Peak, Stanley Peak, Mount Whymper, Kiwetinok Peak, and Mount Marpole. The mountain's toponym was officially adopted on March 31, 1924, by the Geographical Names Board of Canada.

== Geology ==
Mount Pollinger is composed of sedimentary rock laid down during the Precambrian to Jurassic periods. Formed in shallow seas, this sedimentary rock was pushed east and over the top of younger rock during the Laramide orogeny.

== Climate ==
Based on the Köppen climate classification, Mount Pollinger is located in a subarctic climate zone with cold, snowy winters, and mild summers. Winter temperatures can drop below −20 °C with wind chill factors below −30 °C.

== Gallery ==
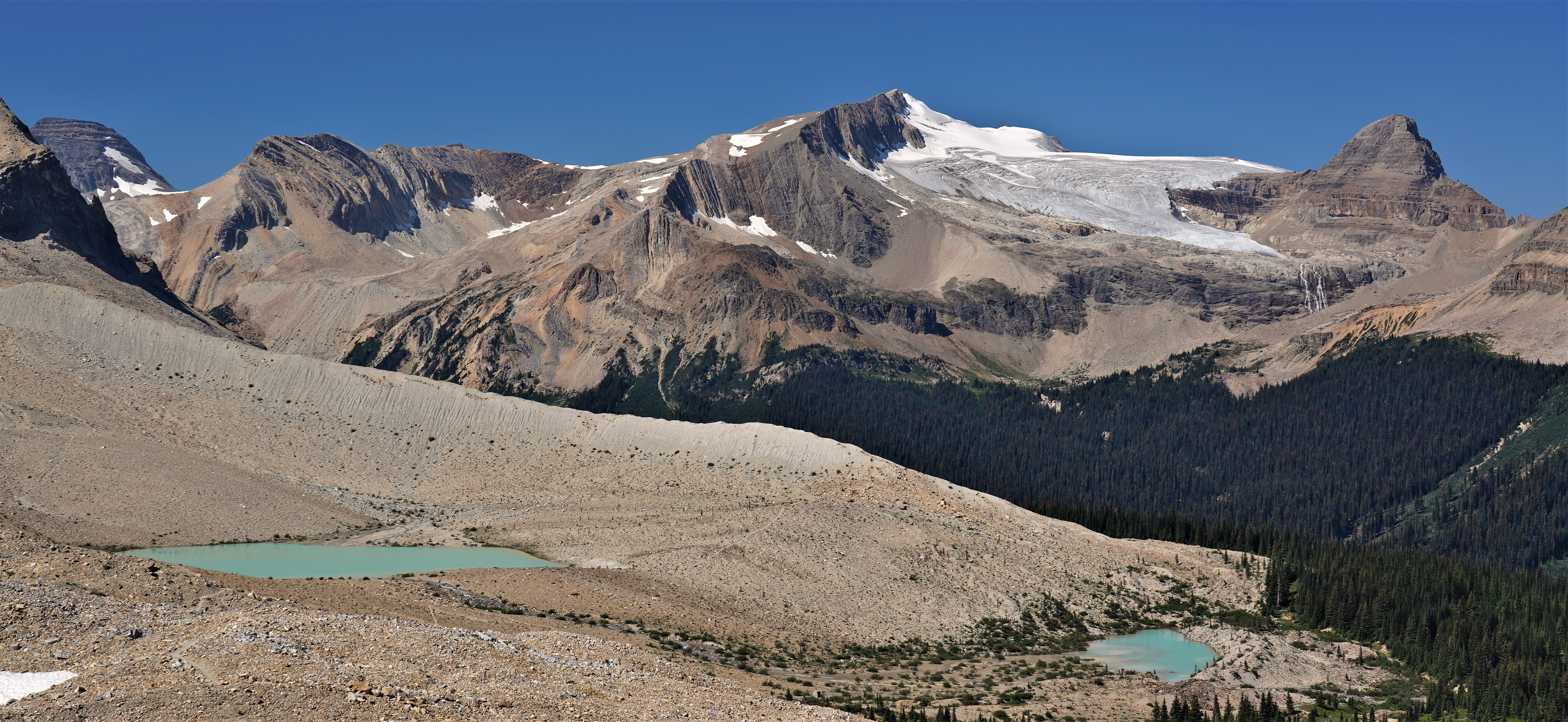
L→Rː Kiwetinok Peak (partial), Mount Pollinger, Mount McArthur, Isolated Peak.

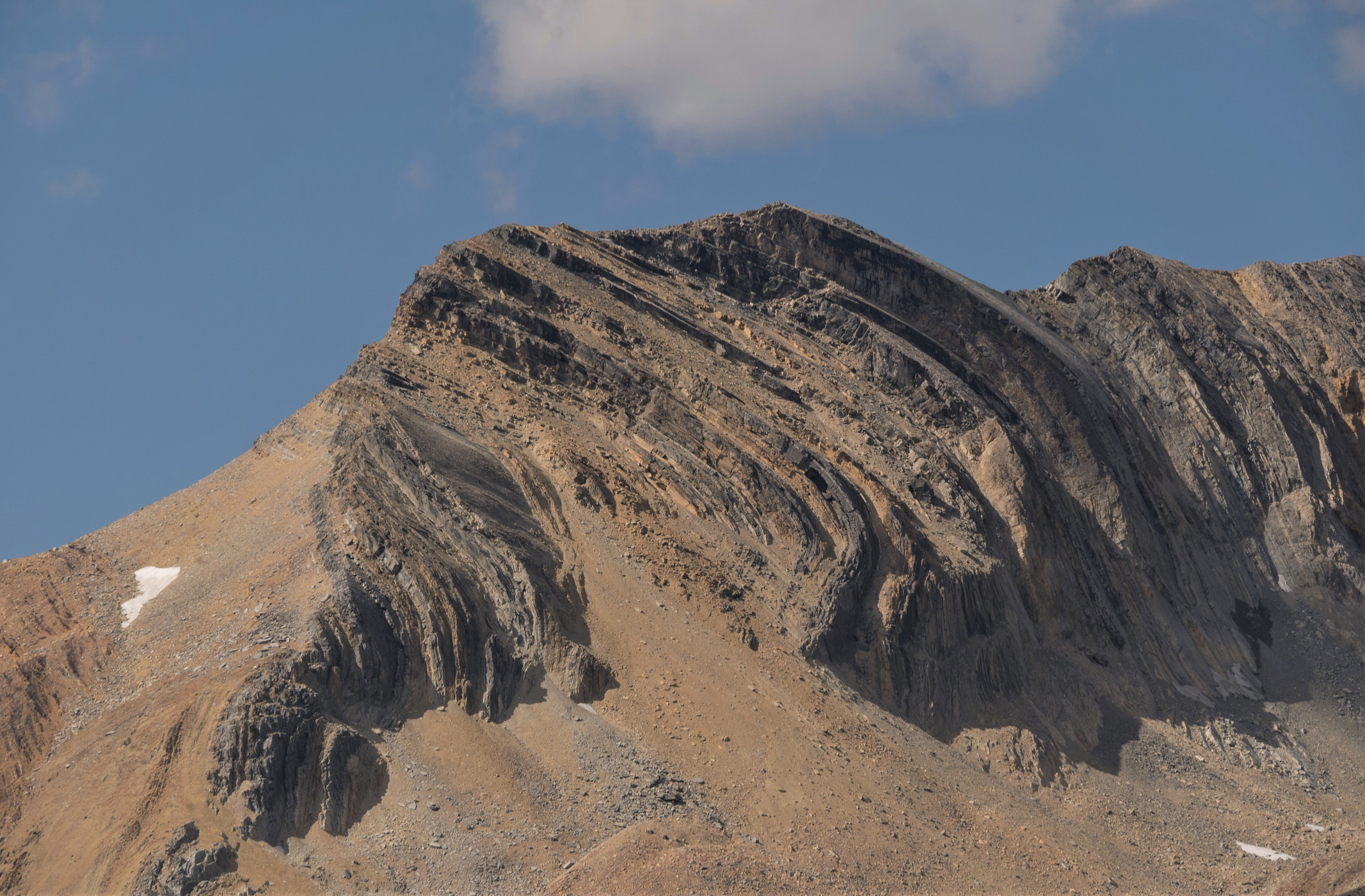
Tilted sedimentary rock layers on the southeast ridge of Mount Pollinger

== See also ==
- Geography of British Columbia
