= Stanley Mitchell hut =

Building in British Columbia, Canada

- Interactive map of the Stanley Mitchell hut area

General information
- Type: alpine hut
- Architectural style: Log cabin
- Location: Little Yoho Valley, Canada
- Coordinates: 51°31′36″N 116°33′48″W
- Opened: 1940
- Owner: Alpine Club of Canada

Technical details
- Material: Wood

Design and construction
- Architect: Alpine Club of Canada

Website
- https://www.alpineclubofcanada.ca/facility/stanley.html

The Stanley Mitchell hut is an alpine hut located at an altitude of 2,060 metres (6,759 ft) in the Little Yoho Valley in Yoho National Park, British Columbia, Canada. It sits in a small meadow not far from the base of a mountain called The President. It serves as a base for hiking, scrambling, ski-touring and climbing the nearby mountains. The hut is maintained by the Alpine Club of Canada.

== History ==
Along with A.O. Wheeler and Elizabeth Parker, Stanley Mitchell was responsible for founding the Alpine Club of Canada in 1906, and from 1907 to 1930 he served as its Secretary-Treasurer. He had a great reputation as a gentleman among his fellow founders and the executive of the club, as well as the members he met at the club house in Banff. He died in 1940, shortly after the hut which bears his name was completed.

The Little Yoho Valley has long had a reputation as an excellent alpine climbing area as well as a magnificent skiing area. The Canadian military used the area during the summer of 1943 as a training site for mountaineering techniques. From 1954 to the mid-70s mountaineering legend Hans Gmoser used the hut as a base for his ski touring operation – a company which eventually became the heli-skiing operator Canadian Mountain Holidays.

The hut has undergone a few renovations, but is relatively the same as it was in 1940. It is presently in excellent condition; a comfortable facility set in beautiful meadow and mountain terrain, and a fine memorial to one of the Club's founders.

The Stanley Mitchell hut was designated a Federal Heritage Building in 1997.

== Access ==
The Little Yoho Valley is located on the north side of the Trans-Canada Highway, 21 km west of Lake Louise, Alberta and 3.7 km east of Field, British Columbia. The turn-off to the trailhead is signed as Takakkaw Falls on the highway. Follow the Yoho Valley Road to the Takakkaw Falls parking lot (13 km from the highway). In summer, park at the most northerly point (closest to the Parks Canada campground). In winter, follow the Yoho Valley Road for approximately 1 km and park at the locked gate. The rest of the road is unplowed in winter.

=== Summer routes ===
Trailhead location	21 km west of Lake Louise, AB / 3.7 km east of Field, BC
Hiking distance	11 kilometres (6.8 mi)
Elevation gain	520 metres (1,710 ft)
Approximate time	3–4 hours

The two common approaches to the Stanley Mitchell hut are the Little Yoho Valley trail and the Iceline Trail. Both originate at the Takakkaw Falls parking lot and follow well-developed National Park trail systems. It is more common to approach the hut on the former trail, and to hike the Iceline on the descent, to avoid the immediate grueling uphill of this trail. Descending the Iceline allows a visitor to hike toward, rather than away from, the scenery surrounding the trail. Approaching the hut from the Little Yoho Valley Trail then descending the Iceline Trail places the hiker about 1 km from the parking area.

The Little Yoho Valley is the most common way of getting to the hut. The trails are well developed, maintained and signed (follow the signs for Little Yoho or the hut). The route is well graded, and (including a few short optional diversions), very scenic. The standard hiking time in the summer is three to four hours but, because a lot of parties use this hut as one of their first backpacking trips and as an introduction to backcountry adventures, it can be underestimated.

Begin hiking on the Little Yoho Valley and Twin Falls trail (signed). The trail passes the Takakkaw Falls campground almost immediately. The trail is mostly level for about the first 4 km, and begins gaining elevation at "Hollingsworth Hill" after passing the junction for Point Lace falls. A little further at Laughing Falls there is another campground and the trail divides with Twin Falls to the right, and the Little Yoho Valley to the left. The left trail climbs into the Little Yoho Valley via a series of switchbacks (the longest climb of the hike). There is another trail junction for Marpole Lake about 0.5 km before reaching the top of the Laughing Falls hill. Stay left on the trail which continues to climb the hill. Half a kilometre further, at the top of the main elevation gain, is the junction for the Whaleback trail to the right, and the Little Yoho Valley to the left; in another 100 m there is another junction for the Iceline trail via Celeste Lake to the right. The hut is approximately 3.5 km further situation in an open meadow near the Warden Station.

The 'Iceline Trail' provides views of Takakkaw Falls and the glaciers above on the slopes of the Vice President as well as beyond. The glaciers and the peaks of the Waputik Icefield are visible; with the Scott Duncan hut lies north of Mount Daly on the southern end of the Waputik Icefield. The Iceline trail is more commonly used descending from the hut, making a great loop trail. Early in the summer, the trail can be difficult to follow and an ice axe might be required to safely cross some of the steep snow slopes.

From the Takakkaw Falls parking lot, the trail rises about 600 m (2,000 ft) and descends about 100 m (330 ft) over 11 km. Most of the elevation gain takes place within the first couple of kilometers. It usually takes 3–5 hours. Drive up the Yoho Valley Road as described above. A visitor can leave their car at the parking lot beside the Whiskey Jack Hostel, just before Takakkaw Falls. The trail starts a couple of hundred metres north of the hostel. Climb the trail up the hillside above, through the forest to the left of a giant avalanche slide path. After 1 km there is a junction for a side trip to Hidden Lake to the left, and a couple of hundred metres further, a junction for Yoho Pass and Yoho Lake to the left. Keep right at both of these intersections. The trail continues rising, then levels out and follows well-developed trails on moraine on the northeast side of the President Range, before dropping down to the Little Yoho River and the Stanley Mitchell hut.

=== Winter routes ===
Trailhead location	21 km west of Lake Louise, AB / 3.7 km east of Field, BC
Skiing distance	23 kilometres (14 mi)
Elevation gain	675 metres (2,210 ft)
Approximate time	Full day (longer if breaking trail)

The information below describes the character and difficulty of the undertaking, but is inadequate for planning or carrying out the trips themselves. Refer to Ski Trails in the Canadian Rockies by Chic Scott, or Summits & Icefields: Canadian Rockies by Chic Scott for complete access information

Two routes are commonly used to access the hut in winter: the Little Yoho Valley approach, which gives access from the highway in a long one-day push, and the less common multi-day Yoho Traverse across the des Poilus Glacier from the Wapta Icefield. Both routes are serious undertakings, and as a result this hut is used much less in the winter than in the summer months.

On the Little Yoho Valley approach, the road to Takakkaw Falls is not plowed in winter, and must be skied. The first 5 km are normally trackset. After arriving at the Takakkaw Falls, the route follows the one taken in summer. The ascent from the highway to the hut is approximately 700 m (2,200 ft) over 23 km. Allow a full day for this approach – longer breaking the trail is planned. Many people split the trip into two days, with a bivouac at the campground cook shelter just past Takakkaw Falls. There are no amenities at the shelter.

The route follows the road to Takakkaw Falls and the summer hiking trail to the hut. The trail signs may be completely under snow, and the final stretch to the hut may be difficult to follow if a trail has not been broken or if the sun goes down.

The Yoho Traverse is a major, multi-day ski tour with a couple of variations. Hikers can begin at either Bow hut or Peyto hut, or the Icefields Parkway. It is possible to push through to Stanley Mitchell hut in a day from Bow hut, but most parties camp out one night on the des Poilus Glacier. The summary below assumes a start at the Bow hut.

From Bow hut the hiker gains about 820 m (2,700 ft), and loses about 1100 m (3,600 ft) over 20 km. The route is sometimes done in a full day from the Bow hut, but many parties plan on two days. A night out should be planned for, even if not anticipated. The route crosses the Wapta Icefield to the west through the Mount Rhondda – Mount Gordon pass and across the southeast slopes of Mount Collie before descending south onto the des Poilus Glacier. It passes Isolated Peak on its east side, and descend its south slopes to the hut.

== Facilities ==
Stanley Mitchell hut – Living Room View

Heating	Wood stove
Lighting	Propane
Cooking	Propane oven & range, cookware, dishes & utensils provided
Sleeping	Dormitory style on thick foam mattresses
Capacity	26 in summer, 22 in winter
Drinking water	From the creek (boil or filter)
Human Waste	Outhouse
Dishwater	Ground sump
Garbage	Pack it out

Stanley Mitchell hut – Kitchen View

The Stanley Mitchell hut is a 1 1/2-storey log building. The hut consists of a large kitchen area and a living/dining room with tables, seats and a wood-burning stove. It has a good supply of tools including water buckets, axes, saws, shovels, etc.

The hut sleeps 24 in summer and 20 in winter. The sleeping quarters have 4-inch-thick (100 mm) covered foam mattresses and are in a small room on the main floor and a large upstairs loft. Sleeping arrangements are dormitory-style, on two long bunks (bring earplugs!).

The hut is lit by several propane lights. It has a wood-burning stove for heating and drying clothes. Firewood is stored behind the hut. Visitors are instructed to replace all firewood used in the hut with cut and split wood from the pile.

The kitchen is well supplied with dishes, cutlery, utensils, pots and pans and bake ware (including roasting pans, cookie sheets, coffee percolator, bread pans and muffin pans). There is a full-size propane oven, as well as some two-burner propane stoves for cooking. Propane is supplied by the Alpine Club via a large outdoor tank. Drinking water is available from a small stream fed by Kiwetinok lake (a day hike) running through the meadow 60 m south of the hut. It is advisable to boil or treat the water before drinking it. In the winter visitors can dig down to the creek or melt snow for water.

Grey water disposal is in a ground sump next to the hut. Grey water can be drained directly down the sinks, but it is important to ensure that the strainer is in place under the drain. Food scraps (including coffee grounds) should not be allowed to enter the grey water sump or it will become plugged. Periodically, the strainer contents should be emptied into the fireplace. The grey water sump occasionally freezes in the winter, in which case the grey water (strained of food particles) should be dumped within a three-meter radius of the outhouse.

The outhouse is located 30 m west of the front door of the main hut. No garbage should be dumped in the outhouse. All paper garbage and food scraps should be burned, and all other garbage and unused food should be packed out.

== Requirements ==
- Sleeping bag
- Toilet paper
- Newspaper for lighting the fire
- Matches
- First aid kit
- 9 volt battery for the smoke detector
- Combination lock number for the hut door (call the ACC office to confirm before going to the hut)
- Reservation form from the ACC (to show the custodian)
- Parks Canada overnight or annual wilderness pass (the former will be on the reservation form if purchased it through the ACC).

== Activities ==
The hiking on established trails in the vicinity of the hut is excellent, with interesting trips back down the valley toward Twin Falls (such as the Whaleback trail and the Marpole Lake trail) as well as up past the hut toward Kiwetinok Pass.

The big mountaineering objectives of the area are The President and the Vice President. The routes from the col between the two peaks are excellent moderate mountaineering challenges that see a fair number of beginners brought along. The Vice President also offers a very good snow and ice route on the north face. The North Ridge and East Face of Mount McArthur to the northwest are also very good alpine outings.

Besides the President and Vice President, the other peaks in the area are primarily scrambling outings. Some of the most common objectives are Mount Kerr, Mount Pollinger, Kiwetinok Peak and Isolated Peak. There is also very good scrambling along Whaleback Mountain.

Author Chic Scott raves about the backcountry skiing in the Little Yoho Valley in the winter, referring to both the skiing terrain and the warmth and atmosphere at the Stanley Mitchell Hut. According to Chic, the valley, with its perfect terrain, excellent snow and ski runs which end at the door of the hut is the Gem of the Rockies.

It is an awfully long way to haul ice climbing gear, but if accomplished the hiker will be rewarded with ascents of the lovely Twin Falls (100 m, WI 4–5).

== Parks Canada Information ==
Stanley Mitchell hut is in Yoho National Park. All vehicles stopping in a National Park must have a Park Motor Vehicle Permit. Annual or single day permits can be purchased at most Park entrance gates and Park visitor centres.

Banff, Jasper, Kootenay, Yoho, and Glacier National Parks collect a fee for backcountry overnight use in the Parks. The fees collected from the wilderness passes go towards maintaining trails, supplying the voluntary registration service, avalanche forecasting, backcountry bridge-building, etc. Overnight users of the ACC huts (ages 16 and over) are required to pay this fee.

The maximum group size for hiking is 10 persons. If the group is larger, split into smaller groups.

It is recommended that anyone participating in hazardous activities in the backcountry register with the Park Wardens. This registration is free and is the best method of ensuring that someone comes looking for the registrant, should the worst happen. Visitors can register at any Parks Canada Visitor Centre.

== Nearby ==
- The President and Vice President
- Mount McArthur
- Mount Kerr
- Isolated Peak

== Maps ==
Map reference	NTS 82N10 Blaeberry River
Grid reference	303081
GPS coordinates	51°31' 36"-116°33' 48" NAD83 11U 530293 5708485
Hut elevation	2,060 m (6,825 feet)

- Lake Louise and Yoho (Map). 1:50,000. Guides for Hiking and Recreation in the Canadian Rockies. Gem Trek Publishing. ISBN 1-895526-64-7. This excellent map shows the trails and highlights of the area.
- 82N/10 (Blaeberry River) (Map). 1:50,000. National Topographic System (NTS). Canadian Government. Archived from the original on 2007-12-24. The hut is found on the bottom right hand corner at grid reference 303081
- 82N/8 (Lake Louise) (Map). 1:50,000. National Topographic System (NTS). Canadian Government. Archived from the original on 2007-12-24. The parking lot and trailhead are on the upper left corner
- 82N/9 (Hector Lake) (Map). 1:50,000. National Topographic System (NTS). Canadian Government. Archived from the original on 2007-12-24. The middle part of the trail is on the lower left corner
- 82N/7 (Golden) (Map). 1:50,000. National Topographic System (NTS). Canadian Government. Archived from the original on 2007-12-24. if the intention is to climb the President and Vice President.
- Touring the Wapta Icefield, by Murray Toft (Map). 1:50,000. Druid Mountain Enterprises. § Bow-Yoho Traverse. Contains the critical areas of the above four maps
