= Mount Carnarvon =

Mountain in British Columbia, Canada

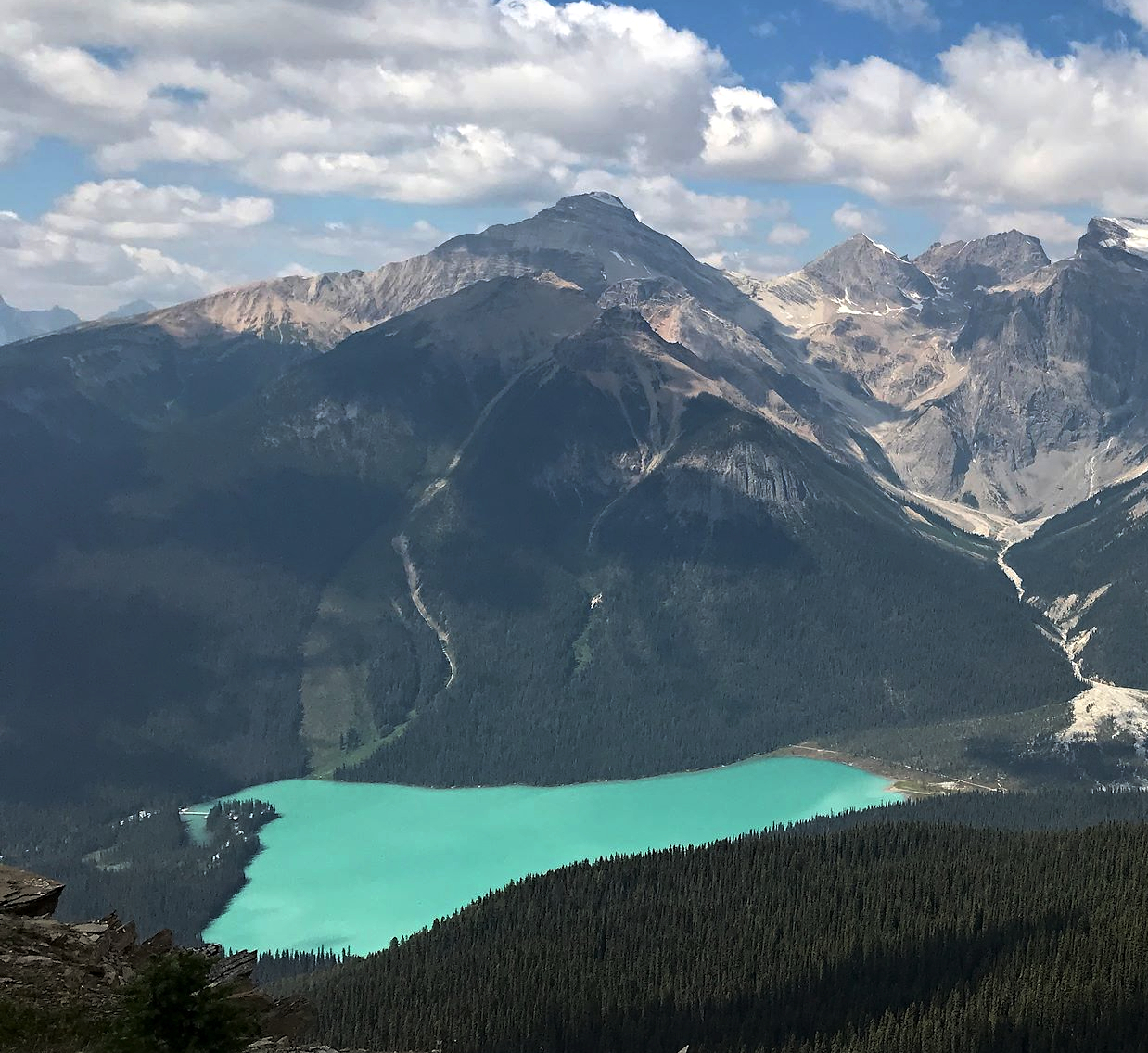
- Mount Carnarvon seen with Emerald Lake from Mount Burgess

Highest point
- Elevation: 3,046 m (9,993 ft)
- Prominence: 406 m (1,332 ft)
- Parent peak: The President (3123 m)
- Listing: Mountains of British Columbia
- Coordinates: 51°28′13″N 116°35′20″W

Geography
- Location within British Columbia Location within Canada
- Interactive map of Mount Carnarvon
- Location: Yoho National Park; British Columbia, Canada
- District: Kootenay Land District
- Parent range: President Range; Canadian Rockies
- Topo map: NTS 82N7 Golden

Geology
- Rock age: Cambrian
- Rock type: sedimentary rock

Climbing
- First ascent: 1904 by Dominion Topographic Survey
- Easiest route: Scrambling

Mount Carnarvon is a 3,046-metre (9,993-foot) mountain summit located in the Kiwetinok River Valley of Yoho National Park, in the Canadian Rockies of British Columbia, Canada. Its nearest higher peak is The President, 3.9 km (2.4 mi) to the north-northeast. Both are part of the President Range which is a subset of the Waputik Mountains. Mount Carnarvon is situated five kilometers northwest of Emerald Lake, but is hidden from view behind Emerald Peak. However, Carnarvon is visible from Highway 1, the Trans-Canada Highway. The months July through September offer the most favorable weather for viewing or climbing Mount Carnarvon.

== History ==
Originally known as Emerald Mountain, the mountain was named in 1900 by Alexander MacKinnon Burgess (Commissioner of Public Lands) after Henry Herbert, 4th Earl of Carnarvon (1831-1890), who in 1867 authored the British North America Act which conferred self-government on Canada. Then in 1874, he effected the settlement of difficulties between Canada and British Columbia on the "Carnarvon Terms".

The first ascent of the mountain was made in 1904 by members of the Dominion Topographic Survey.

The mountain's name was officially adopted in 1924 when approved by the Geographical Names Board of Canada.

== Geology ==
Mount Carnarvon is composed of sedimentary rock laid down during the Cambrian period. Formed in shallow seas, this sedimentary rock was pushed east and over the top of younger rock during the Laramide orogeny.

== Climate ==
Based on the Köppen climate classification, Mount Carnarvon is located in a subarctic climate with cold, snowy winters, and mild summers. Temperatures can drop below −20 °C with wind chill factors below −30 °C. Precipitation runoff from Mount Carnarvon drains into tributaries of the Kicking Horse River.

== Gallery ==
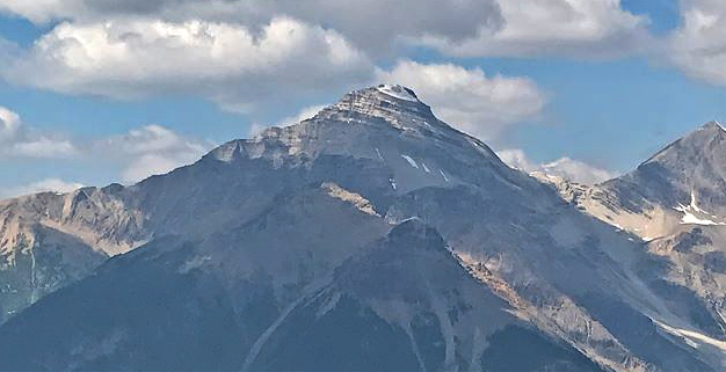
Mount Carnarvon

== See also ==
- Geography of British Columbia
