= The Vice President (mountain) =

Mountain in British Columbia, Canada

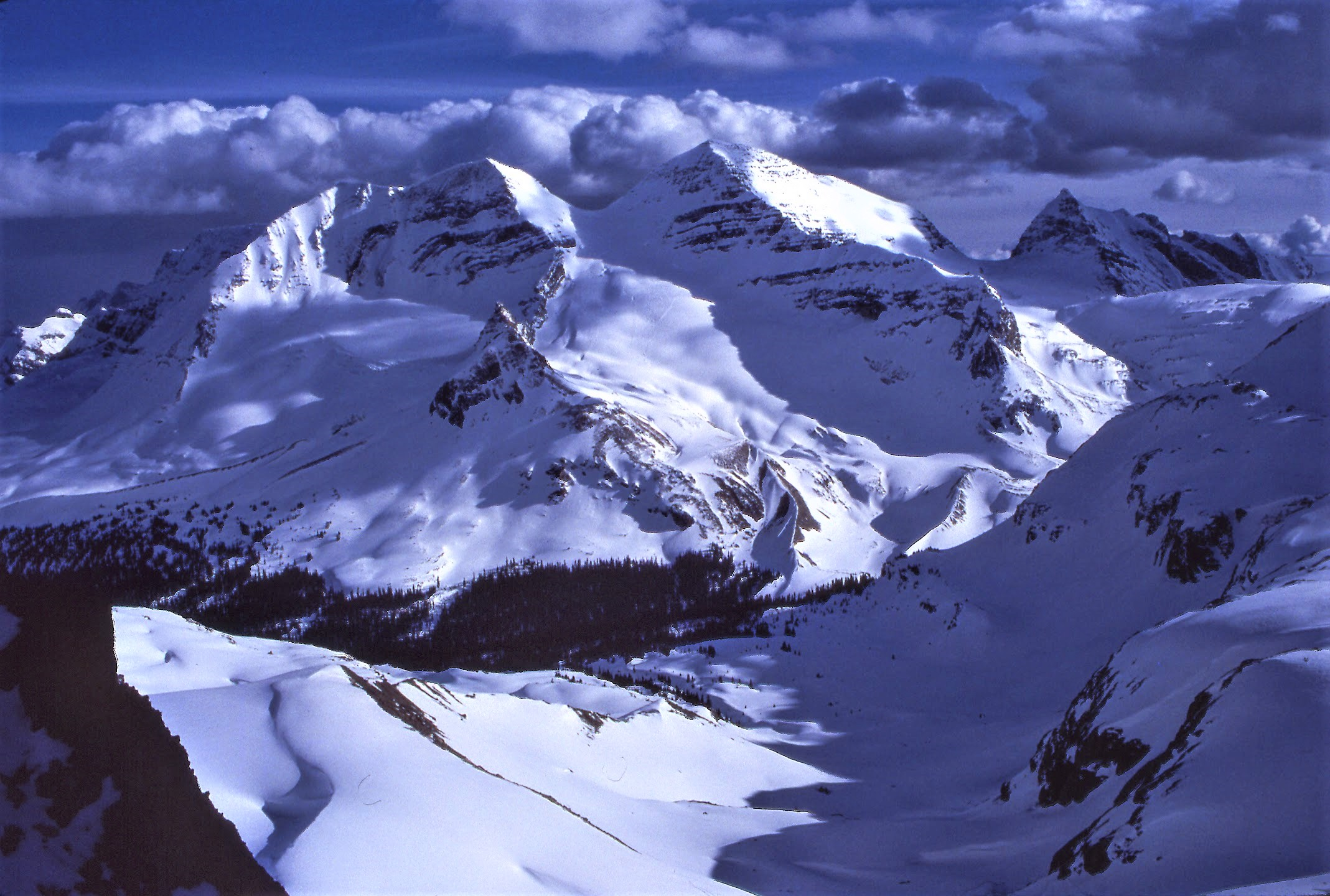
- Vice President & President (l-r) from Isolated col

Highest point
- Elevation: 3,077 m (10,095 ft)
- Prominence: 167 m (548 ft) above President Pass
- Coordinates: 51°30′10″N 116°33′09″W

Geography
- Country: Canada
- Province: British Columbia
- District: Kootenay Land District
- Parent range: President Range
- Topo map: NTS 82N10 Blaeberry River

Climbing
- First ascent: 1901 by James Outram, Christian Kaufmann and Joseph Pollinger
- Easiest route: scramble

The Vice President is a mountain on The President/Vice President Massif just north of Emerald Lake in Yoho National Park, near the Alpine Club of Canada's Stanley Mitchell hut. The Vice President was named Mount McNicoll in 1904 by Edward Whymper after David McNicoll, the VP of the Canadian Pacific Railway. In 1907, the mountain was renamed by the Alpine Club of Canada, after it was discovered that the name had already been used on a mountain near Rogers Pass.

== Routes ==
There appears to be only one route up the Vice President—up the President glacier to the col, then up a snow slope to the ridge, then to the peak.

== Gallery ==
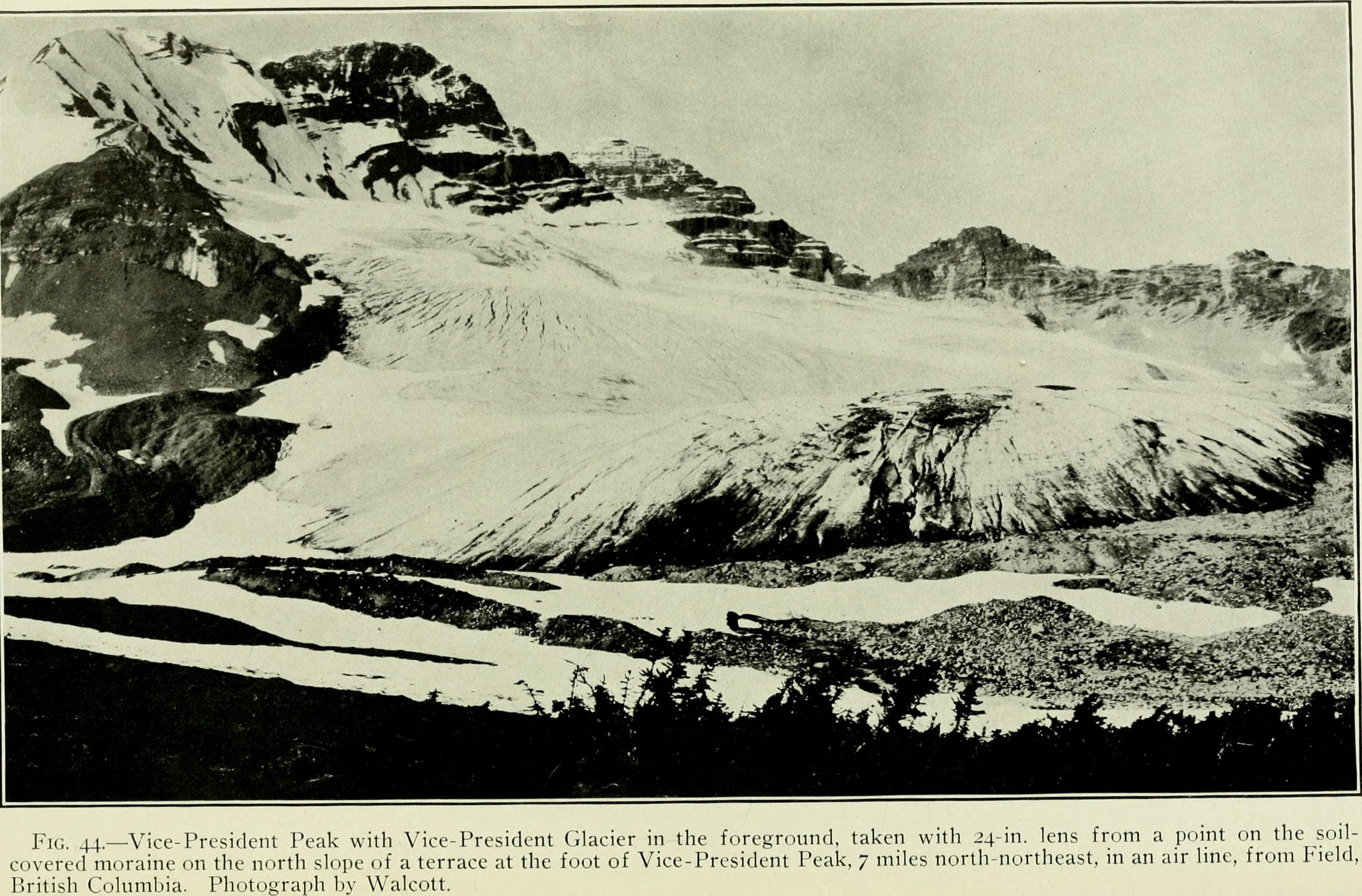
The Vice President and glacier (1910)

Left to right, The Vice President, President glacier and The President
