= Emerald Peak (Yoho) =

Mountain in Yoho NP, British Columbia, Canada

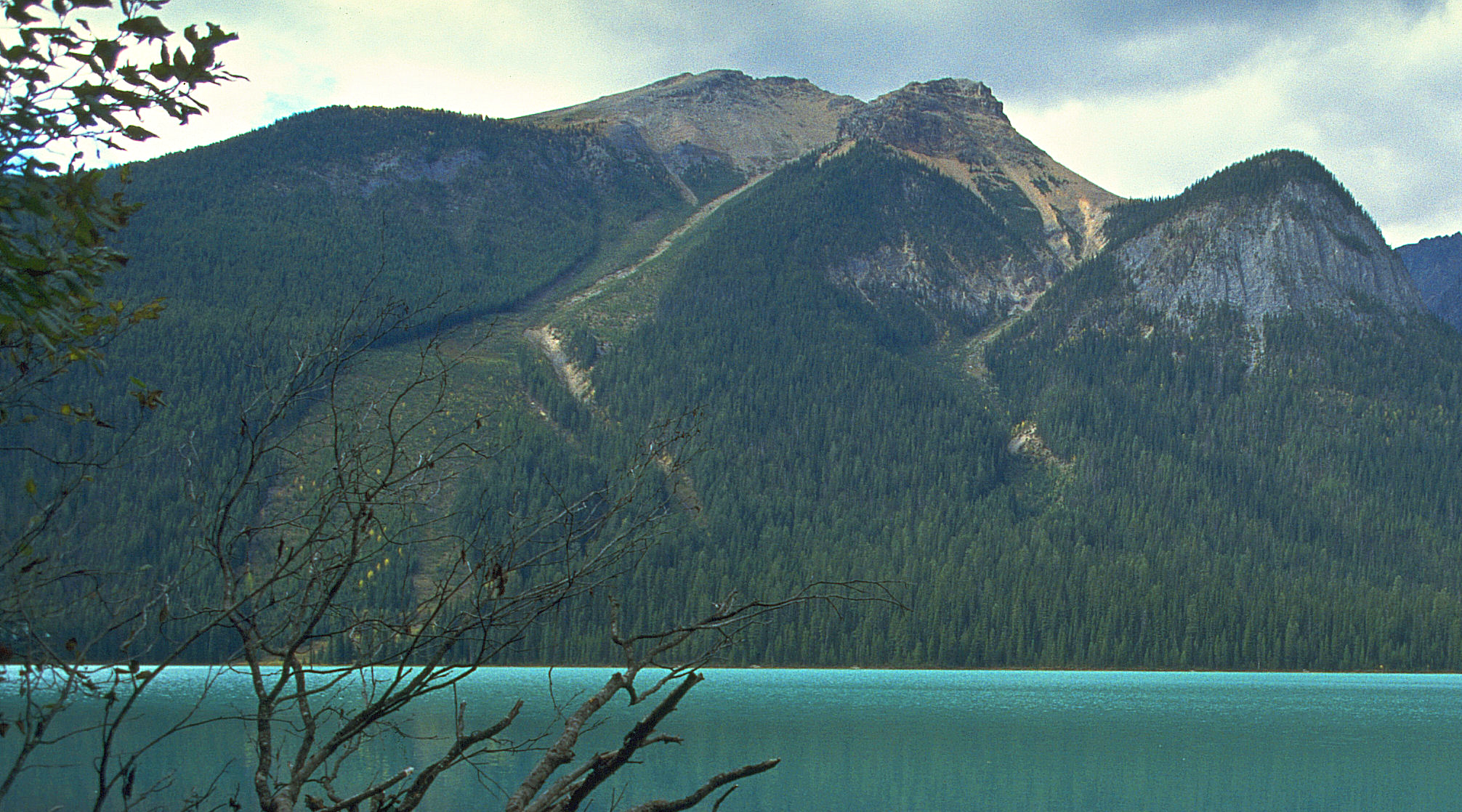
- Emerald Peak seen from Emerald Lake

Highest point
- Elevation: 2,566 m (8,419 ft)
- Prominence: 166 m (545 ft)
- Parent peak: Mount Carnarvon (3046 m)
- Listing: Mountains of British Columbia
- Coordinates: 51°27′35″N 116°34′13″W

Geography
- Location within British Columbia Location within Canada
- Interactive map of Emerald Peak
- Location: Yoho National Park; British Columbia, Canada
- District: Kootenay Land District
- Parent range: President Range; Canadian Rockies
- Topo map: NTS 82N7 Golden

Climbing
- Easiest route: Scramble

Emerald Peak is a 2,701-metre (8,862-foot) mountain summit located in Yoho National Park, in the Canadian Rockies of British Columbia, Canada. Its nearest higher peak is Mount Carnarvon, 1.7 km (1.1 mi) to the northwest. Both are part of the President Range which is a subset of the Waputik Mountains. Emerald Peak is visible from Emerald Lake, rising 1,256-metre (4,121-foot) above the northwest shore. The mountain's name was officially adopted in 1924 when approved by the Geographical Names Board of Canada, in association with Emerald Lake, which in turn was named in 1900 on account of its colour.

== Geology ==
Emerald Peak is composed of sedimentary rock laid down during the Cambrian period. Formed in shallow seas, this sedimentary rock was pushed east and over the top of younger rock during the Laramide orogeny.

== Climate ==
Based on the Köppen climate classification, Emerald Peak is located in a subarctic climate with cold, snowy winters, and mild summers. Temperatures can drop below −20 °C with wind chill factors below −30 °C. Precipitation runoff from Emerald Peak drains into the Emerald River, which is a tributary of the Kicking Horse River. The months July through September offer the most favorable weather for viewing or climbing Emerald Peak.

== See also ==
- Geography of British Columbia
