= Mons Peak =

Mountain in Alberta and British Columbia, Canada

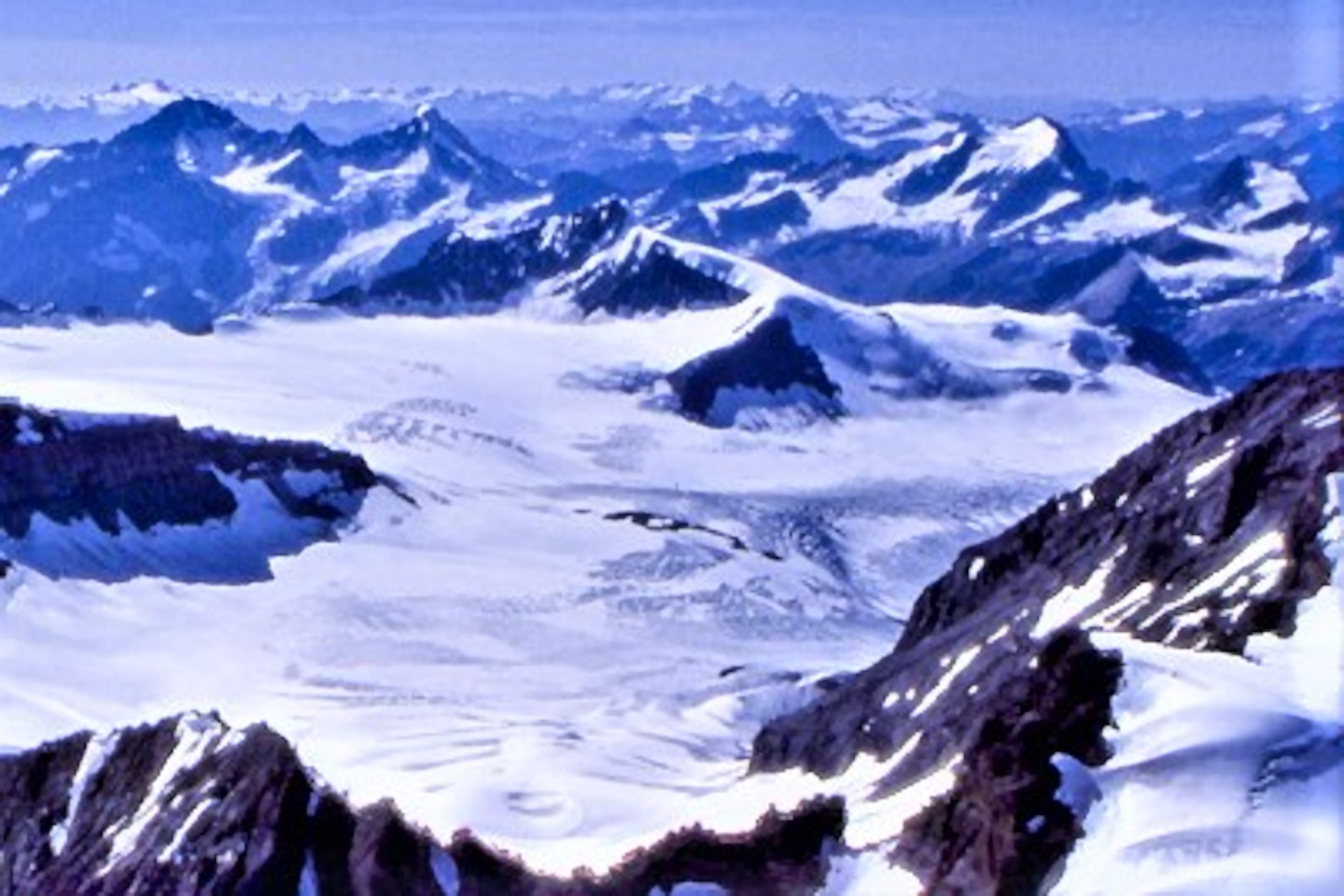
- Mons Peak (Cntr) and Icefield from a Forbes buttress

Highest point
- Elevation: 3,087 m (10,128 ft)
- Prominence: 367 m (1,204 ft)
- Coordinates: 51°51′36″N 117°02′06″W

Geography
- Location within Alberta Location within British Columbia Location within Canada
- Location: Alberta; British Columbia
- Topo map: NTS 82N14 Rostrum Peak

Climbing
- First ascent: 31 July 1902 by James Outram, guided by Christian Kaufmann

Mons Peak is located on the border of Alberta and British Columbia. It was named in 1920 after the town of Mons in Belgium.

== Gallery ==
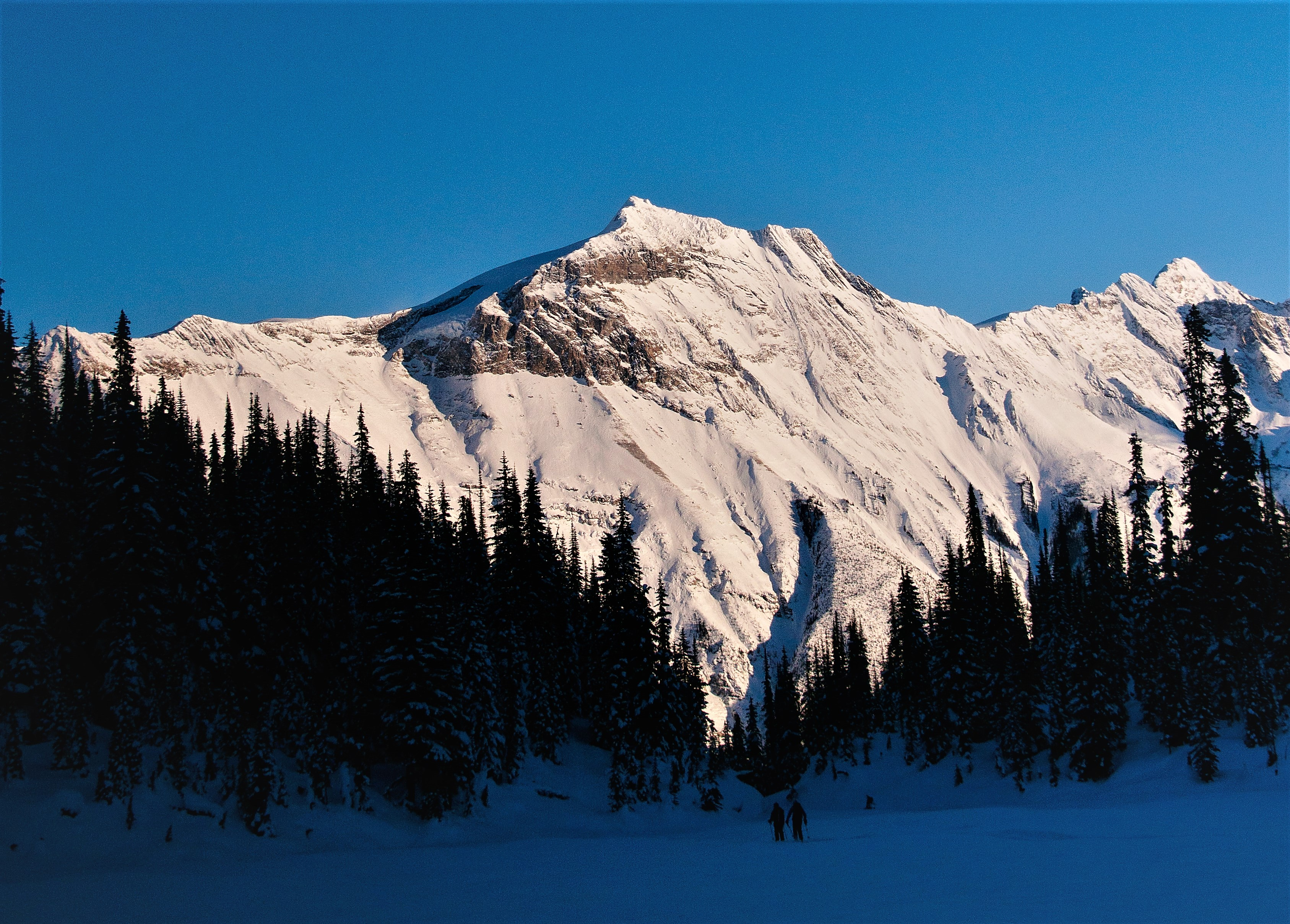
Mons Peak, west aspect

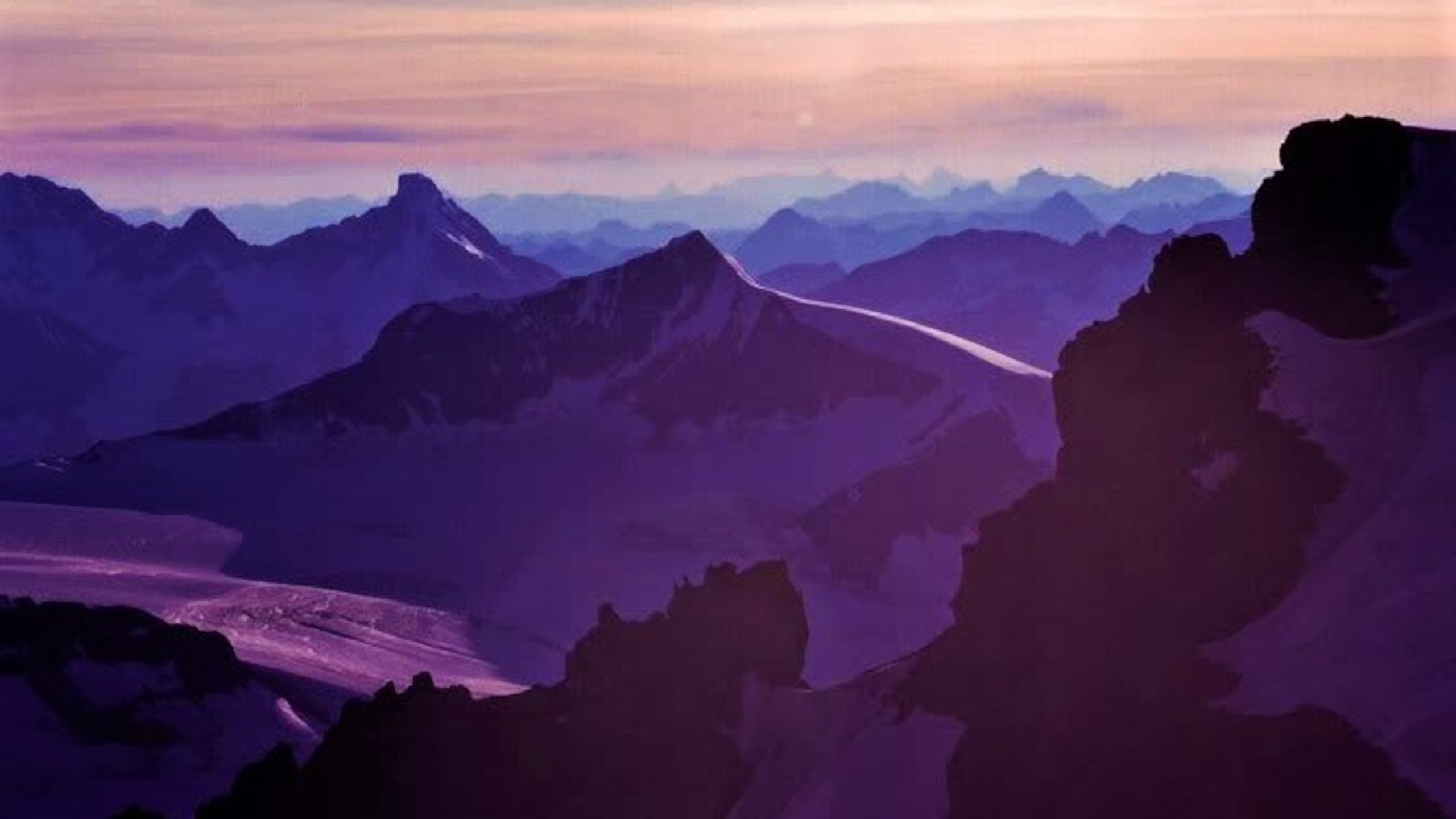
From Mount Forbes (right foreground), to Mons Peak (centre), Bush Mtn (left)

== See also ==
- List of peaks on the Alberta–British Columbia border
- Mountains of Alberta
- Mountains of British Columbia
