= Trolltinder Mountain =

Mountain in Canada

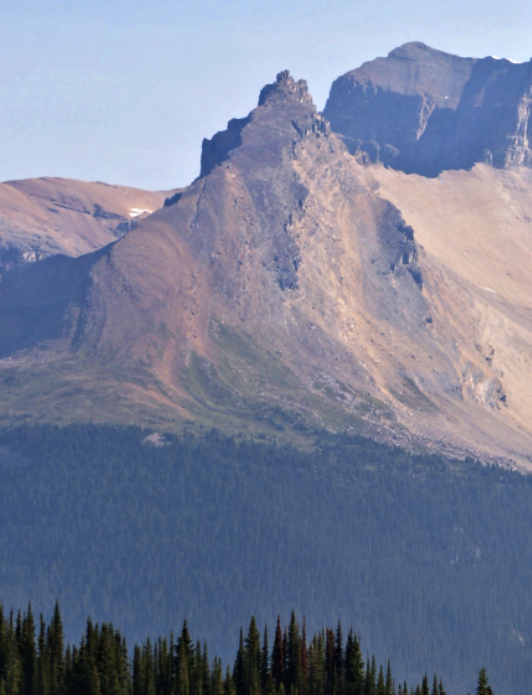
- Trolltinder Mountain seen from Iceline Trail

Highest point
- Elevation: 2,912 m (9,554 ft)
- Prominence: 112 m (367 ft)
- Listing: Mountains of British Columbia
- Coordinates: 51°33′26″N 116°28′55″W

Geography
- Location within British Columbia Location within Canada
- Interactive map of Trolltinder Mountain
- Location: Yoho National Park; British Columbia, Canada
- District: Kootenay Land District
- Parent range: Waputik Range; Canadian Rockies
- Topo map: NTS 82N9 Hector Lake

Geology
- Rock age: Cambrian
- Rock type: Sedimentary

Climbing
- First ascent: 1901 J. Outram, E. Whymper, C. Kaufmann, C. Klucker, J. Pollinger
- Easiest route: Climbing Class 5

Trolltinder Mountain is a 2,912-metre (9,554-foot) mountain summit located immediately west of the Continental Divide, in the Waputik Range of the Canadian Rockies in British Columbia, Canada. It is situated in Yoho National Park, with its nearest higher peak being Mount Balfour, 1.0 km (0.62 mi) to the northeast, and Fairy Lake directly below its southern slope.

== History ==
The mountain was named by Jean Habel in 1897 for its resemblance to a mountain in Norway. The translation is Witch's Peak. Jean Habel was a German geographer who explored the Yoho Valley in 1896.

The first ascent of the mountain was made in 1901 by James Outram and Edward Whymper, with guides Christian Kaufmann, Christian Klucker, and Joseph Pollinger. Outram described the climb in his book, "In the Heart of the Canadian Rockies" as follows: "On the 21st we had a little climb to a ruined tower on a serrated spur of Mt. Balfour, which had been called by Mr. Habel "Trolltinder," or the Witch's Peaks, after a famous and much pinnacled ridge above the Romsdal in Norway: the legend saying that the points represent a wedding party turned to stone by an evil genius. It was an absurdly simple climb, though somewhat laborious, except for the last fifty feet, which gave us a really good gymnastic scramble."

The mountain's name was officially adopted in 1924 when approved by the Geographical Names Board of Canada.

== Geology ==
Trolltinder Mountain is composed of sedimentary rock laid down during the Precambrian to Jurassic periods. Formed in shallow seas, this sedimentary rock was pushed east and over the top of younger rock during the Laramide orogeny.

== Climate ==
Based on the Köppen climate classification, Trolltinder Mountain is located in a subarctic climate zone with cold, snowy winters, and mild summers. Temperatures can drop below −20 °C with wind chill factors below −30 °C.

== See also ==
- Geography of British Columbia
- Troll Wall
