= Fresnoy Mountain =

Mountain in Alberta and British Columbia, Canada

- Location within Alberta Location within British Columbia Location within Canada

Highest point
- Elevation: 3,240 m (10,630 ft)
- Prominence: 133 m (436 ft)
- Parent peak: Mount Alexandra (3401 m)
- Listing: Mountains of Alberta; Mountains of British Columbia
- Coordinates: 51°59′48″N 117°13′01″W

Geography
- Country: Canada
- Provinces: Alberta and British Columbia
- Protected area: Banff National Park
- Parent range: Park Ranges
- Topo map: NTS 82N14 Rostrum Peak

Climbing
- First ascent: 1902 by James Outram and Christian Kaufmann

Fresnoy Mountain is located on the border of Alberta and British Columbia. It was named in 1919 after Fresnoy-en-Gohelle, a village in France, in commemoration of the World War I battle fought there by Canadian forces in 1917.

== See also ==
- List of peaks on the British Columbia–Alberta border
- List of mountains in the Canadian Rockies
