= Mont des Poilus =

Mountain in the country of Canada

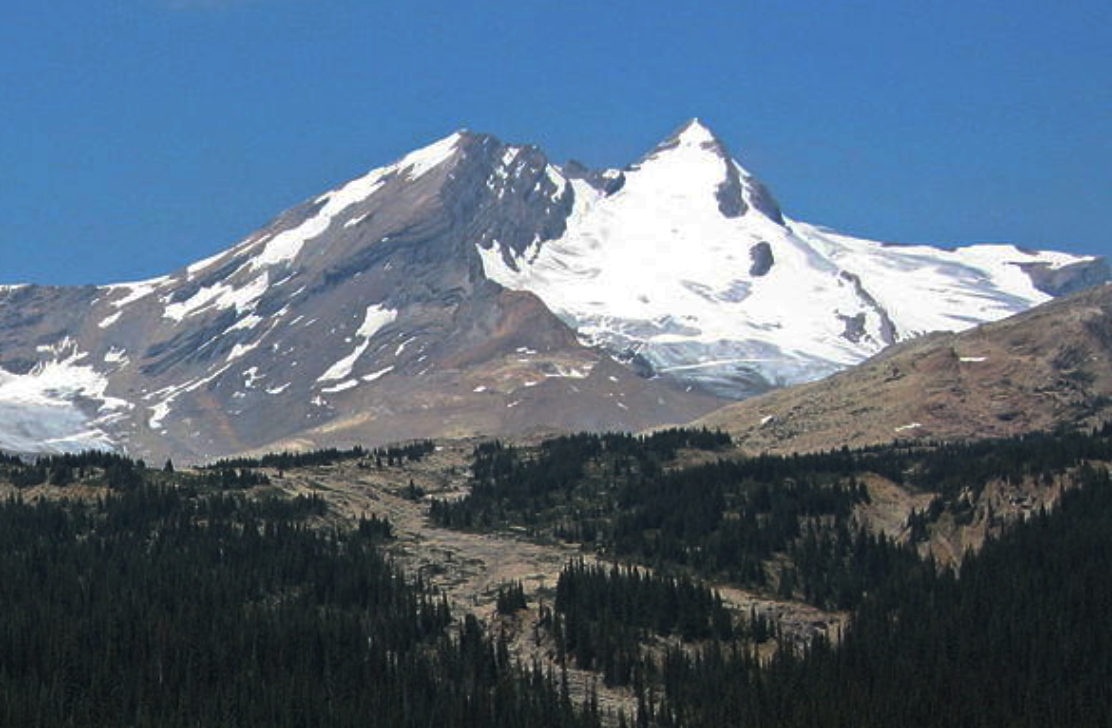
- Mont des Poilus seen from Yoho Valley

Highest point
- Elevation: 3,161 m (10,371 ft)
- Prominence: 466 m (1,529 ft)
- Parent peak: Mount Baker (3180 m)
- Listing: Mountains of British Columbia
- Coordinates: 51°35′41″N 116°36′24″W

Geography
- Location within British Columbia Location within Canada
- Interactive map of Mont des Poilus
- Country: Canada
- Province: British Columbia
- District: Kootenay Land District
- Protected area: Yoho National Park
- Parent range: Waputik Mountains; Canadian Rockies
- Topo map: NTS 82N10 Blaeberry River

Geology
- Rock age: Cambrian
- Rock type: sedimentary rock

Climbing
- First ascent: 1901 James Outram, Edward Whymper, guided by C. Kaufmann, C. Klucker and J. Pollinger

Mont des Poilus is a 3,161-metre (10,371-foot) mountain summit in Yoho National Park, in the Canadian Rockies of British Columbia, Canada. Its nearest higher peak is Mount Baker, 8.0 km (5.0 mi) to the north. Both are part of the Waputik Mountains.

== History ==
It was named by Arthur Wheeler one week following the armistice which ended the First World War to honour the poilus, the common soldiers of the French Army.

The first ascent of Mont des Poilus was made 1901 by James Outram, Edward Whymper, guided by C. Kaufmann, C. Klucker and J. Pollinger.

The mountain's name became official in 1924 when approved by the Geographical Names Board of Canada.

== Geology ==
Mont des Poilus is composed of sedimentary rock laid down during the Cambrian period. Formed in shallow seas, this sedimentary rock was pushed east and over the top of younger rock during the Laramide orogeny. The Glacier des Poilus lies on the east aspect of the peak, and is part of the larger Waputik Icefield.

== Climate ==
Based on the Köppen climate classification, Mont des Poilus is located in a subarctic climate zone with cold, snowy winters, and mild summers. Temperatures can drop below −20 °C with wind chill factors below −30 °C. Precipitation runoff from Mont des Poilus drains into the Yoho River and Amiskwi River, both tributaries of the Kicking Horse River.

== See also ==
- Geography of British Columbia
