= Kiwetinok River =

Location
- Country: Canada
- Province: British Columbia
- District: Kootenay Land District

Physical characteristics
- Source: Kiwetinok Pass
  - location: Rocky Mountains
- Mouth: Amiskwi River
  - location: West of Emerald Lake
  - coordinates: 51°25′27″N 116°36′56″W
  - elevation: 4,269 ft (1,301 m)

The Kiwetinok River is a short river in British Columbia. It is the largest tributary of the Amiskwi River.

== Course ==
The Kiwetinok rises in Kiwetinok Pass, not in Kiwetinok Lake, which is actually the source of the Little Yoho River and not in the Kiwetinok or Amiskwi River drainages. Kiwetinok Lake actually is at the east end of the pass, while the Kiwetinok River runs from the west end. The river, 9.8 kilometres (6.1 mi) long, flows in a southern direction to its confluence with the Amiskwi. The Kiwetinok does not have any major tributaries.

== See also ==
- List of rivers of British Columbia
