= Whaleback Mountain =

Summit in Canada

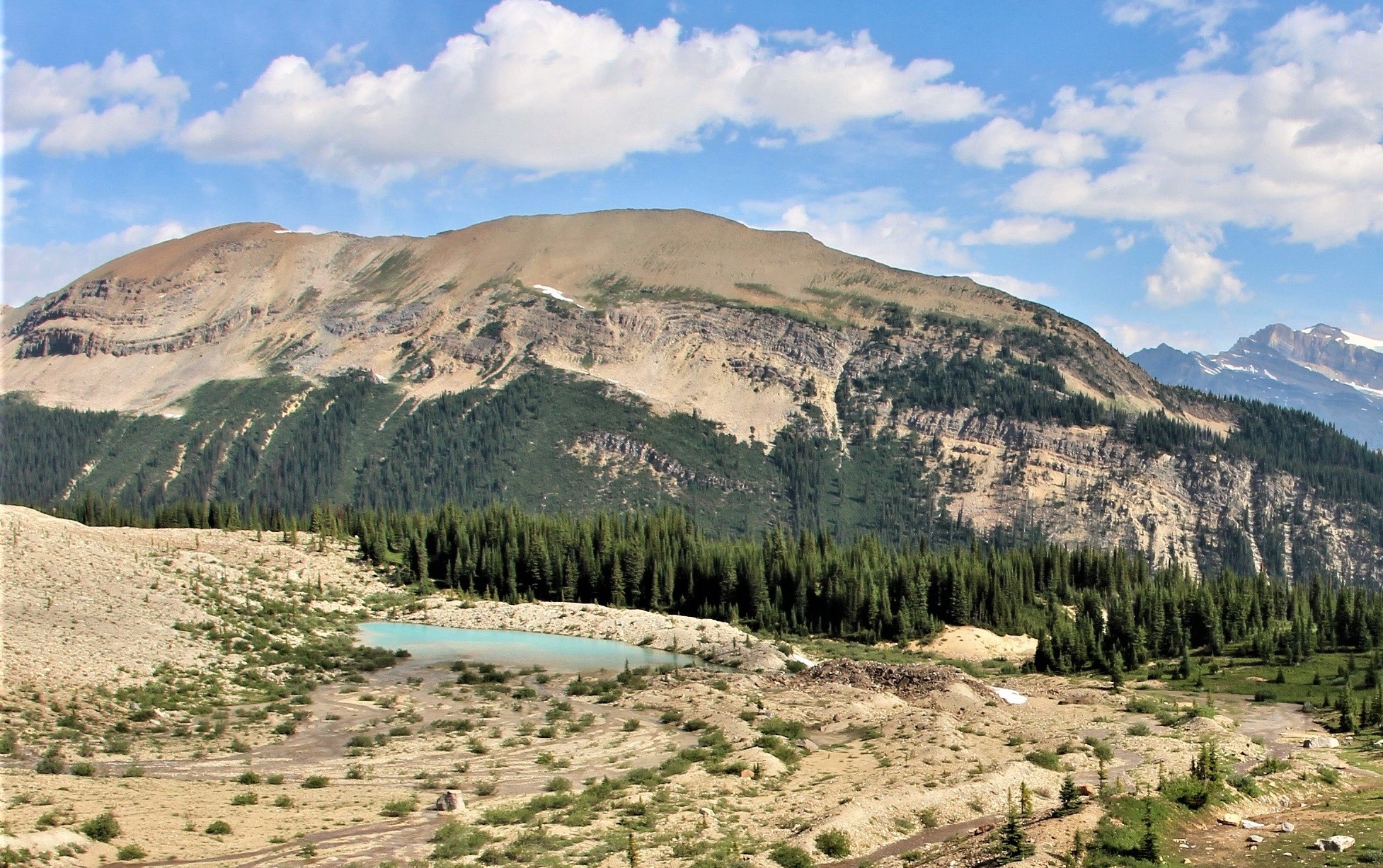
- Southeast aspect, from Iceline Trail

Highest point
- Elevation: 2,627 m (8,619 ft)
- Prominence: 45 m (148 ft)
- Isolation: 0.907 km (0.564 mi)
- Listing: Mountains of British Columbia
- Coordinates: 51°32′22″N 116°33′38″W

Geography
- Location within British Columbia Location within Canada
- Interactive map of Whaleback Mountain
- Country: Canada
- Province: British Columbia
- District: Kootenay Land District
- Protected area: Yoho National Park
- Parent range: Waputik Mountains; Canadian Rockies
- Topo map: NTS 82N10 Blaeberry River

Geology
- Rock age: Cambrian
- Rock type: Sedimentary rock

Whaleback Mountain is a 2,627-metre (8,619-foot) summit in British Columbia, Canada.

== Description ==
Whaleback Mountain is located in Yoho National Park, in the Waputik Mountains of the Canadian Rockies. Precipitation runoff from Whaleback drains into tributaries of the Yoho River which in turn is a tributary of the Kicking Horse River. Whaleback Mountain is more notable for its steep rise above local terrain than for its absolute elevation as topographic relief is significant with the summit rising 625 meters (2,050 ft) above Little Yoho River in 1.5 km (0.93 mi). The peak is visible from Highway 1 (the Trans-Canada Highway). The nearest higher neighbor is Isolated Peak, 0.9 km (0.56 mi) to the northwest.

== History ==
The mountain was named in 1901 by mountaineer Edward Whymper because the mountain's profile resembles the back of a whale. The mountain's descriptive name was then applied in 1916 by members of the Alberta-British Columbia Boundary Survey. The mountain's toponym was officially adopted on March 31, 1924, by the Geographical Names Board of Canada.

== Geology ==
Whaleback Mountain is composed of sedimentary rock laid down during the Precambrian to Jurassic periods. Formed in shallow seas, this sedimentary rock was pushed east and over the top of younger rock during the Laramide orogeny.

== Climate ==
Based on the Köppen climate classification, Whaleback Mountain is located in a subarctic climate zone with cold, snowy winters, and mild summers. Winter temperatures can drop below −20 °C with wind chill factors below −30 °C.

== Gallery ==
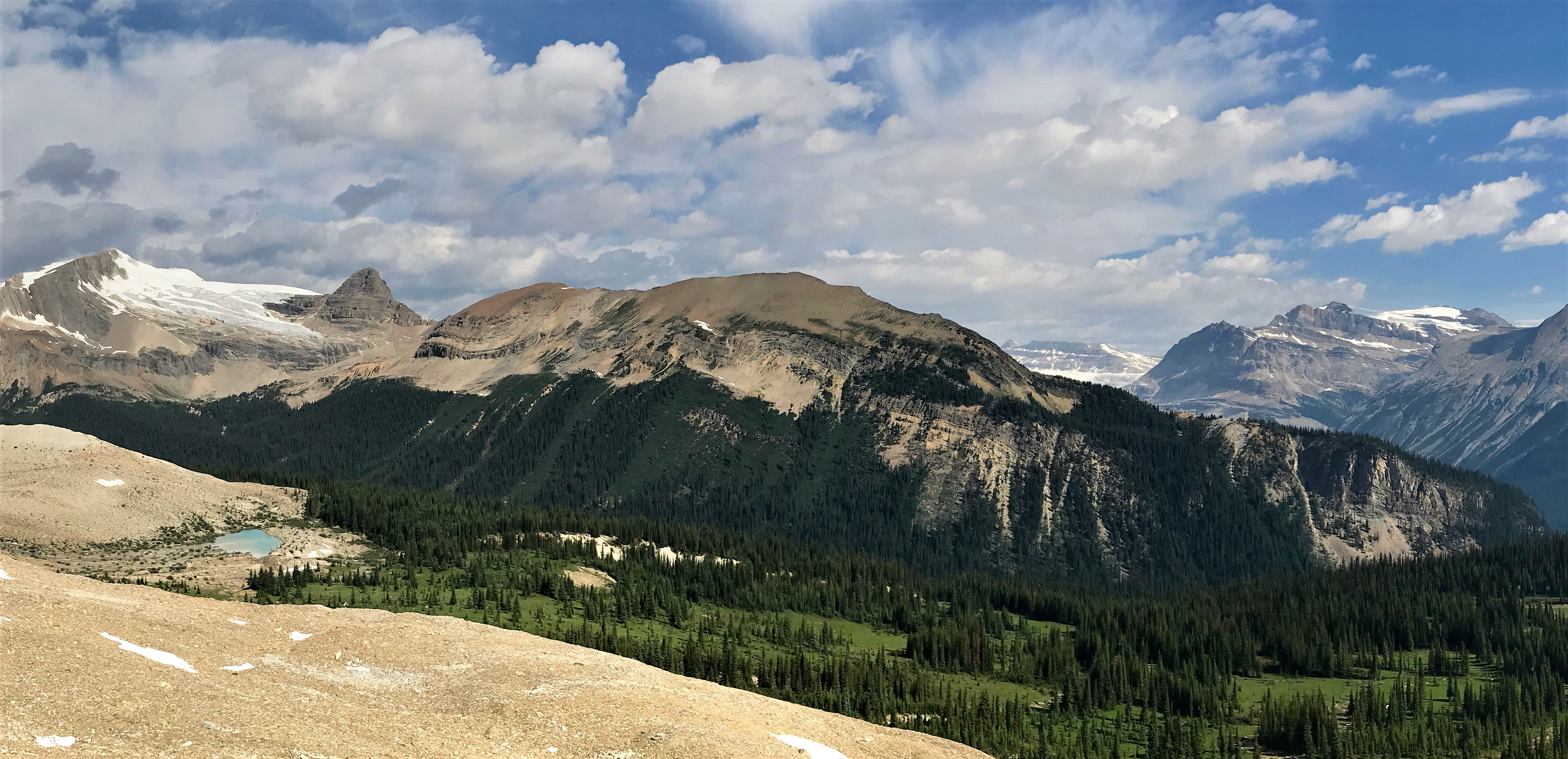
Whaleback Mountain centered

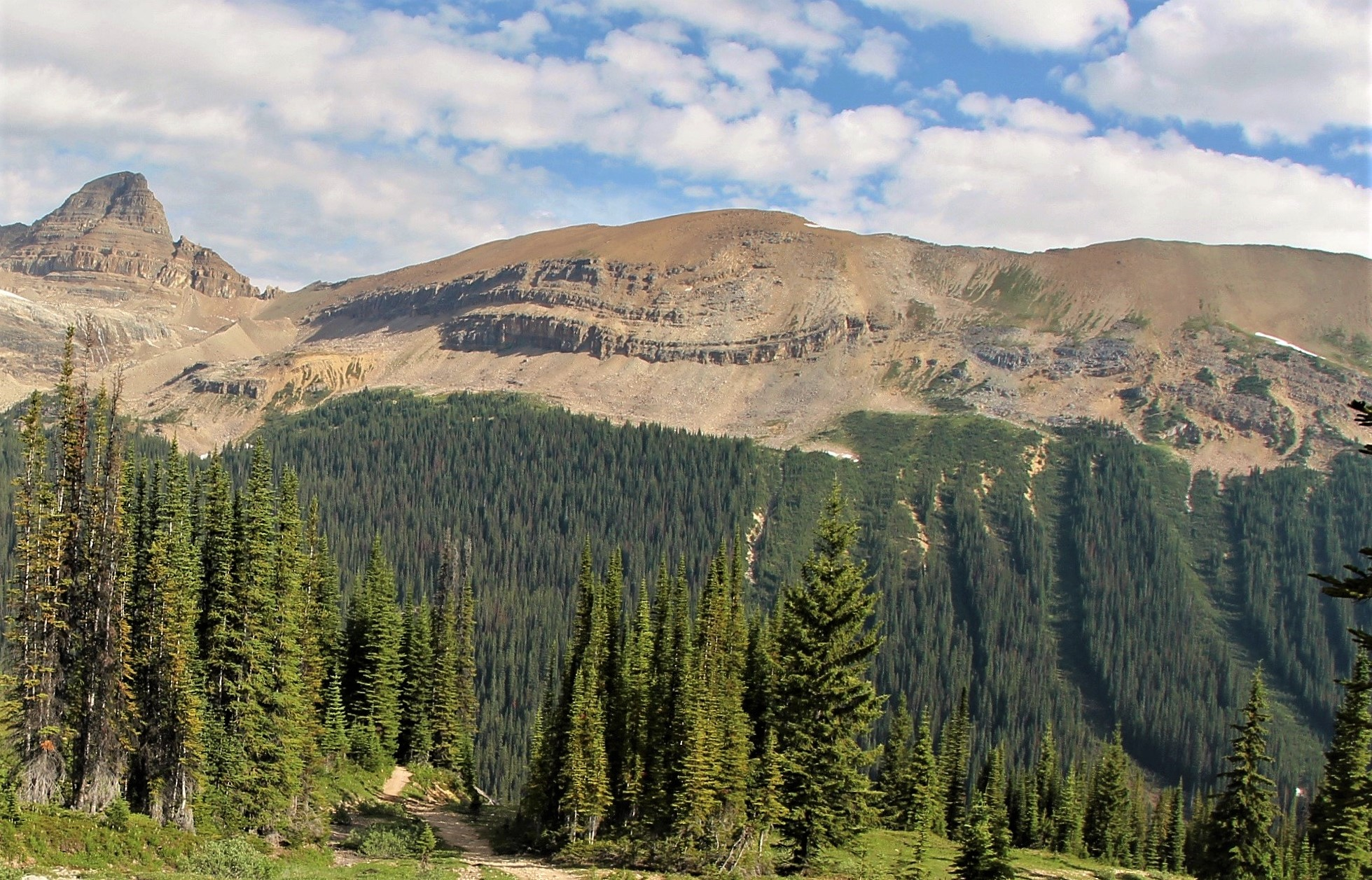
Whaleback Mountain centered, with Isolated Peak to left

== See also ==
- Geography of British Columbia
