= President Range =

Mountain range in Yoho NP, Canada

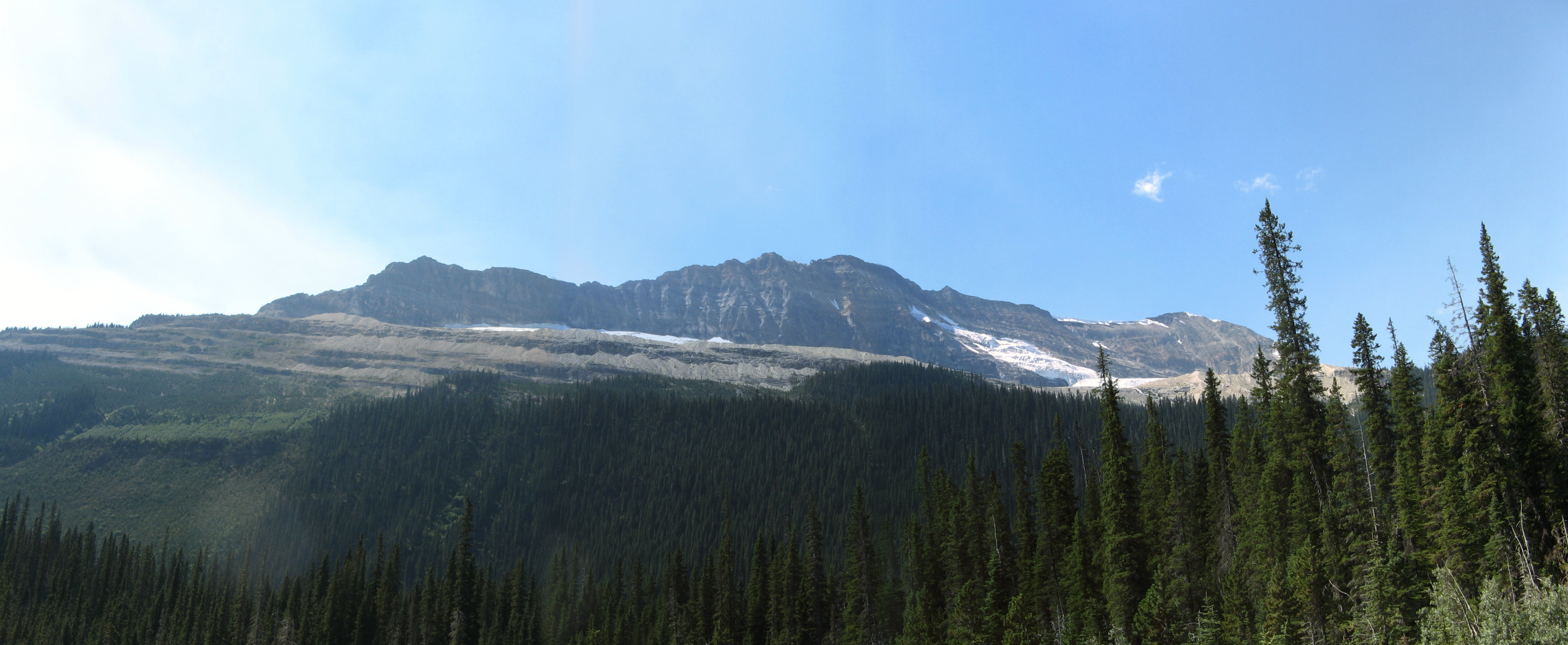
- The President Range in Yoho National Park

Highest point
- Peak: The President
- Elevation: 3,138 m (10,295 ft)
- Listing: Mountains of British Columbia
- Coordinates: 51°30′02″N 116°33′42″W

Dimensions
- Area: 120 km^{2} (46 mi^{2})

Geography
- Location within British Columbia
- Country: Canada
- Province: British Columbia
- Protected area: Yoho National Park
- Range coordinates: 51°30′N 116°33′W
- Parent range: Canadian Rockies
- Topo map: NTS 82N7 Golden

The President Range is a mountain range of the Canadian Rockies, located in the northwestern section of Yoho National Park. The range is named for the highest peak in the range, The President.

== List of Mountains ==
This range includes the following mountains:

| Name | Elevation | | Prominence | | FA | Coordinates |
| Name | m | ft | m | ft | FA | Coordinates |
|---|---|---|---|---|---|---|
| The President | 3,138 | 10,295 | 658 | 2,159 | 1901 | 51°30′3″N 116°33′43″W |
| The Vice President | 3,077 | 10,095 | 157 | 515 | 1901 | 51°30′2″N 116°33′0″W |
| Mount Carnarvon | 3,046 | 9,993 | 406 | 1,332 | 1904 | 51°28′13″N 116°35′20″W |
| Michael Peak | 2,701 | 8,862 | 45 | 148 | 1900 | 51°28′58″N 116°30′47″W |
| Mount Field | 2,643 | 8,671 | 182 | 597 | 1887 | 51°25′50″N 116°27′50″W |
| Mount Burgess | 2,599 | 8,527 | 418 | 1,371 | 1892 | 51°25′12″N 116°30′19″W |
| Emerald Peak | 2,566 | 8,419 | 166 | 545 | | 51°27′35″N 116°34′13″W |
