= Amiskwi River =

River in British Columbia, Canada

Location
- Country: Canada
- Province: British Columbia
- District: Kootenay Land District

Physical characteristics
- Source: Amiskwi Pass
  - location: Rocky Mountains
- Mouth: Kicking Horse River
  - location: West of Field, British Columbia
  - coordinates: 51°22′53″N 116°32′49″W
  - elevation: 3,837 ft (1,170 m)

The Amiskwi River is a stream of about 31.5 kilometres (19.6 mi) in length in British Columbia, Canada. It is a tributary of the Kicking Horse River. The name Amiskwi is a Cree word for Beavertail.

Just as there is an Otterhead River and an Ottertail River (both of which join the Kicking Horse downstream from the Amiskwi), there is also a Beaverfoot River (also a Kicking Horse River tributary) to go with the Beavertail River, which is an old name for the Amiskwi. Another old name of the river is the North Branch Kicking Horse River.

== Course ==
The Amiskwi River is the longest tributary of the Kicking Horse River, beginning at Amiskwi Pass and flowing south for about 20 kilometres (12 mi) then southeast for about 11.5 kilometres (7.1 mi) until its confluence with the Kicking Horse River at almost exactly the same location as the mouth of the Emerald River.

A decommissioned logging road follows the lower course of the Amiskwi from the Emerald River and is presently an unmaintained hiking trail to Amiskwi Pass and a segment of the Great Divide Trail. The road was built for the last commercial logging operation in the mountain parks, which closed in 1968. Remnants of an old mill and log piles can still be seen in the valley.

== Largest tributaries ==
- Otto Creek
- Kiwetinok River

== Amiskwi Lodge ==
Amiskwi Lodge is a small lodge located just above Amiskwi Pass. It is open in the winter and the summer. It provides visitors with many options, such as backcountry skiing in winter or mountain biking in the summer.

== See also ==
- List of rivers of British Columbia
