= Christian Kaufmann (alpine guide) =

Swiss mountain guide

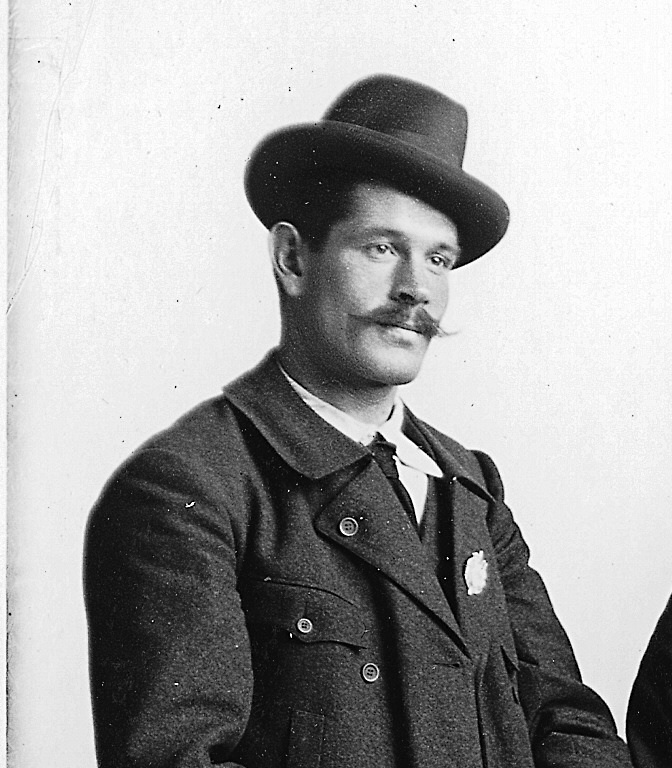

Personal information
- Nickname: Kanada Kaufmann
- Born: 7 March 1872 Grindelwald, Switzerland
- Died: 12 January 1939 (aged 66) Grindelwald, Switzerland
- Spouse: Emma Christen (1881-1962)
- Relatives: Peter Kaufmann (1858-1924), half-brother; Hans (Johann) Kaufmann (1874-1930), brother

Christian Kaufmann (7 March 1872 – 12 January 1939) was a Swiss mountain guide and alpinist who climbed in the Alps, the Canadian Rockies, the Selkirks, the Himalayas, and Norway, accomplishing several dozen first ascents.

== Family and early life (1872–1892) ==
Christian (a.k.a. Christen) was born on 7 March 1872, in Grindelwald to Peter Kaufmann (1832–1903) and Margaretha (née Baumann, 1839–1903). His father, called Graben-Peter or Grabi-Peter, was a well-established certified mountain guide during the Golden Age of Alpinism. Christian was the eleventh of seventeen children in the family. His brother Friedrich (Fritz) Kaufmann (born 1878), brothers Rudolf (born 1875) and Hans (Johann) Kaufmann (1875–1930) as well as his half-brother Peter Kaufmann (1858–1924) all became mountain guides.

From an early age, Christian and his brothers tended goats and cows on the upper pastures, learning about and becoming accustomed to alpine conditions. "From the time he left school, he began to help the family finances by carrying rucksacks for travellers over the Little and Great Scheidegg, to the Faulhorn or Männlichen." He often assisted his father, and, after a three-year apprenticeship as a porter, Christian Kaufmann passed rigorous examinations, so that on 24 June 1892, he was certified in Interlaken as an official mountain guide and given a paginated Führerbuch to record the testimonies of future clients.

== Early climbing career (1892–1901) ==
The first entries in Kaufmann's Führerbuch were written by members of Swiss watchmaking families after their climbs of the Wetterhorn. Gustave Jacot (1864–1939) from Le Locle wrote that Christian and his father (Graben Peter) had guided him in heavy snow (20 June 1892). On 26 and 27 July 1892, Jules Calame-Colin also climbed with Kaufmann. Dr. Gottfried Schwarz (1860–1925), an active member of the Swiss Alpine Club (Randen) and rector of the Kantonalgymnasium in Schaffhausen, joined them.

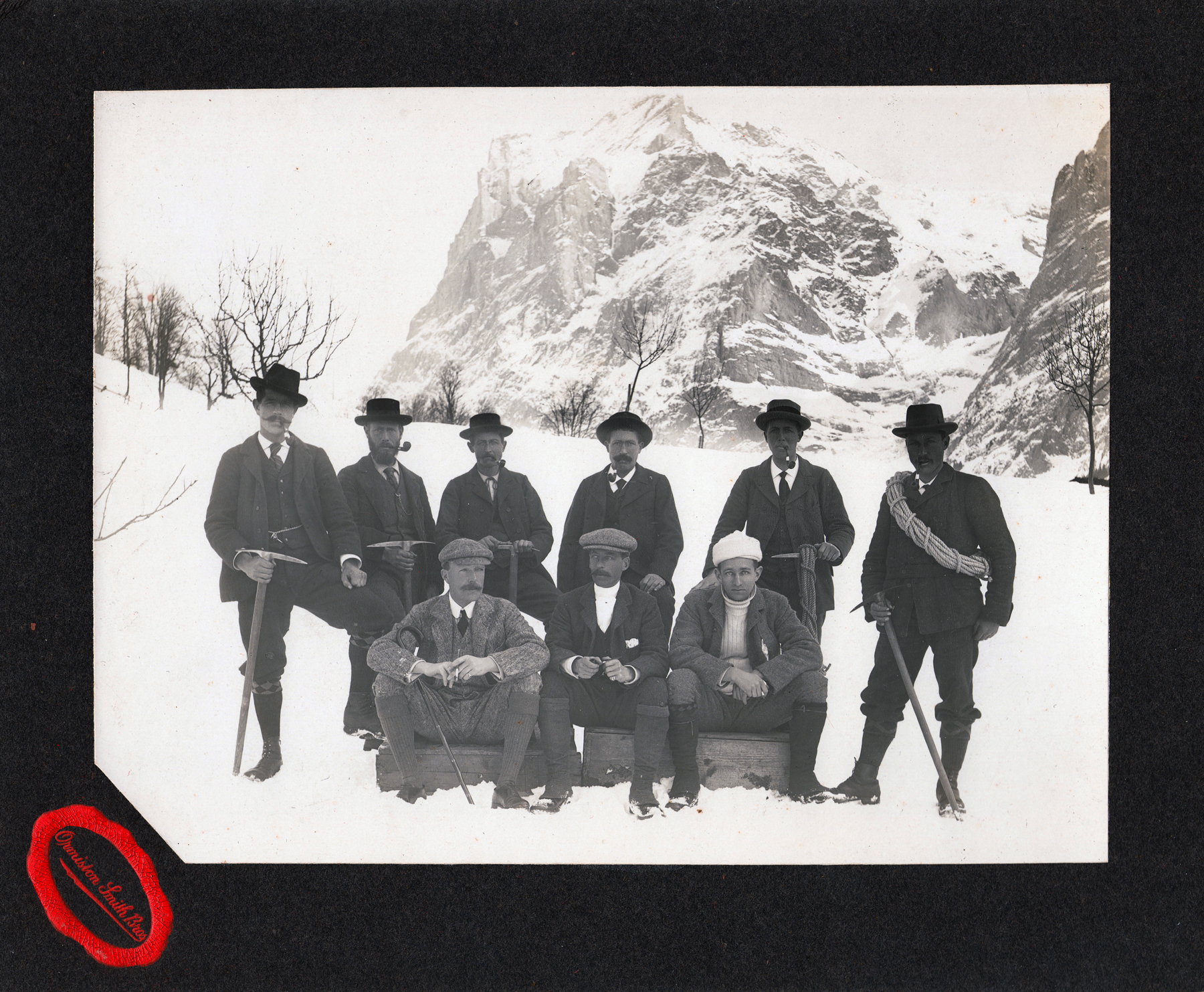
Grindelwald Guides (back row from left): Christian Kaufmann; Peter Kaufmann; Peter Jaggi; Peter Bernet; Christian Kaufmann; Christian Jossi. Photo: F. Ormiston-Smith.

Early in his climbing career, on 14 and 15 August 1894, Kaufmann was one of three guides (including Christian Burgener as first guide) who led the young Winston Churchill to the Gleckstein hut and then to the summit of the Wetterhorn. That year, nineteen-year-old Churchill, his brother Jack, and his tutor J. D. G. Little were on a walking tour of Switzerland; they visited Grindelwald and stayed at the Bear Hotel. Churchill was impressed with his first encounter with the high alps, saying that "the spectacle of the sunrise striking the peaks of the Bernese Oberland is a marvel of light and colour unsurpassed in my experience." Like many of his classmates at Harrow School, Winston had developed a keen interest in mountaineering, inspired by Edward Whymper's lantern-side lecture at the school. In fact, after his alpine climbs, Winston had expressed a desire to become a mountaineer in a letter to Harrow's headmaster, J. E. C. Welldon, who positively encouraged him: "You have got the figure of a mountaineer, and you ought to make yourself a name." However, his life-long friend L. S. Amery, with whom he later climbed Monte Rosa, reported that Winston had suffered from mountain sickness and a badly flayed face. These unpleasant experiences probably discouraged Churchill from following a career in mountaineering.

On 21 September 1895, Christian Kaufmann (age 24), his brother Peter (age 37), and nineteen-year-old Gordon Tayleur, an Englishman, successfully climbed the Mitteleggi of the Eiger. The event "was watched by guides, residents, and tourists along the whole Grindelwald valley." A detailed account appeared in The Times (London): "All available telescopes and opera-glasses were in requisition, and it is not too much to say that each step taken for nine hours was both seen and noted, so that some even professed to give an exact number." They left Grindelwald in darkness at 3:30 am, making their way to Alpiglen and crossing the moraine before the steep climb. Tayleur himself remarked on Christian's endurance, especially his "work step cutting was tremendous, requiring seven hours steady cutting." Moreover, as they reached the top, they climbed in darkness and came to the final ridge at 11 pm.

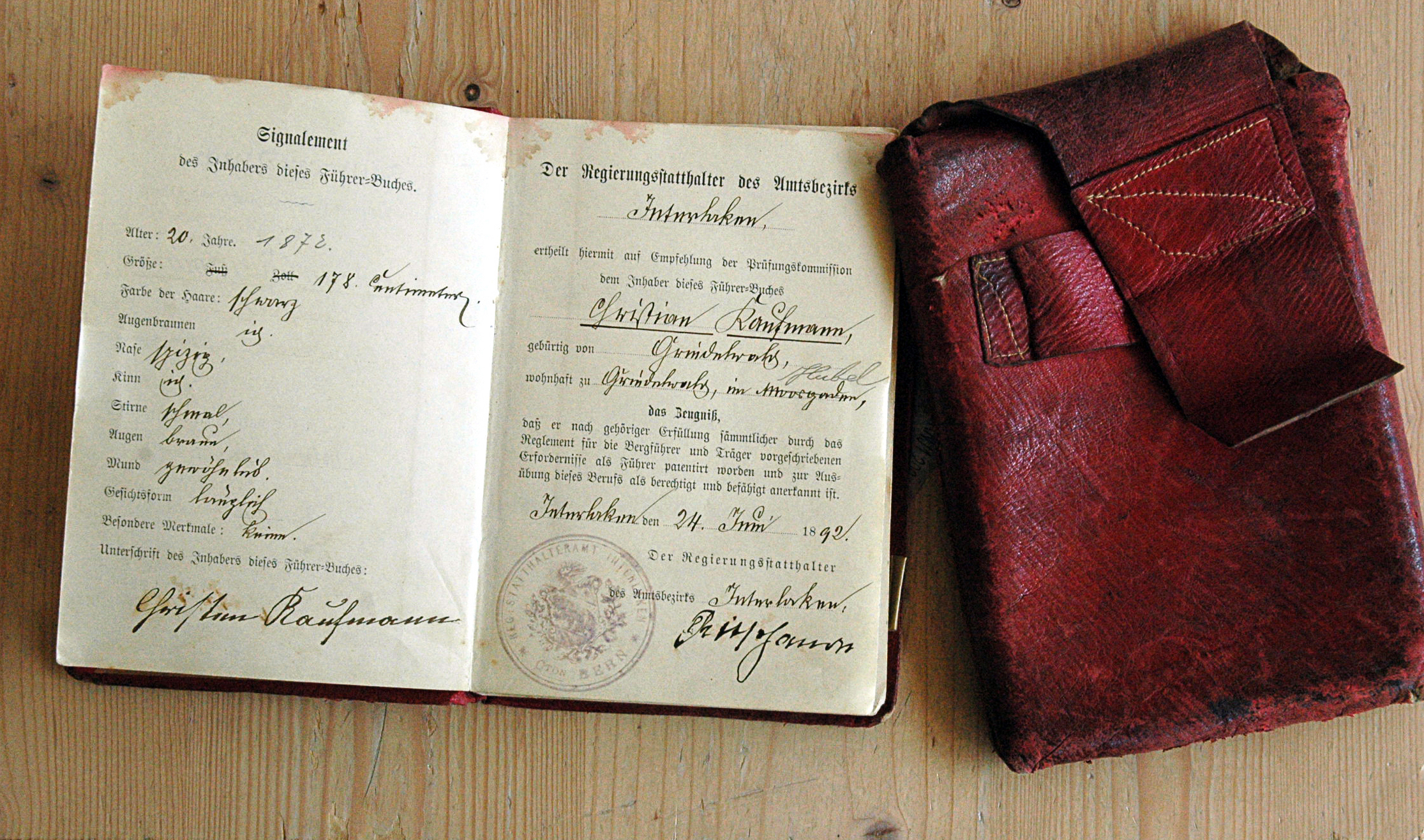
The identification and registration pages of Christian Kaufmann's Führerbuch certifying him as an official mountain guide in June 1892

At the turn-of-the-century, Kaufmann guided Herbert J. Mothersill (1868–1937) four times, including not only trips in the Bernese Oberland (Wetterhorn, Schreckhorn, Jungfrau, Finsteraarhorn, Eiger-Mitteleggi, and Silberhorn in 1895 and 1896) but also to Zermatt (Matterhorn, Breithorn, Weishorn, and Rothorn) and Chamonix (Mont Blanc in 1897). After many challenging climbs, Mothersill died after being fatally injured in a traffic accident.

In 1898, Kaufmann led Charles Alfred Elliott (1835–1911), the former Lt. Governor of Bengal, on a relatively easy climb to the Gleckstein hut and back to Grindelwald. But it was Charles' brother Julius Marshall Elliott (1841–1869) who had died 29 years earlier, on 27 July 1869, in an accident while climbing the Scheckhorn unroped. Elliott had insisted that the party not be roped together; when the party reached an arête (now called "Elliott's Wangli"), Elliott jumped from a steep icy slope to some rocks but slipped sliding down the mountain to his death. The guide, Franz Biener from Zermatt, could most certainly have saved Elliott, had they been roped together. While taking a tour of the Grindelwald glacier many years later, Charles' son Claude made a grim comment as he approached an icy fissure: "My uncle is down there." Julius Marshall Elliott is, in fact, buried in the Grindelwald cemetery.

During this period, there are several detailed entries in Kaufmann's Führerbuch that give insights into his character and the social conditions of the time. In 1899, Dr. Thomas Longstaff—an accomplished explorer and mountaineer—climbed seven weeks with Kaufmann, completing a staggering sixteen ascents in the Bernese, Graian, and Pennine alps. Longstaff considered himself very lucky to be able to employ Kaufmann, "a first-rate guide ... young, very handsome, refined, and of quick intelligence ... a real artist," who brilliantly tackled peaks that he "had never seen, much less set foot on." By observing Kaufmann, he says he "learned more mountaineering than [he] could have gained by any other means." Ada (1877–1949) and Elizabeth (born 1878) Crossley from Burnley, England, comment that their climbs were "long and difficult [to the Jungfraujoch, the Mönch and to the Gross-Schreckhorn], adding that "it is only guides of exceptional ability who would undertake it with two ladies." Daniel P. Rhodes, who later wrote The Pleasure Book of Grindelwald (1903), remarked that Christian is "untiring, quick, and cautious" and "speaks English unusually well." David Davidson, from August 9 to Sept. 1, 1900, climbed nine peaks in the Oberland (Eiger, Mönch, Schreckhorn) and in the Valais (Col de Bertol, Grandes Dents ridge, Dent Blanche, Weisshorn), remarking that "on the Mönch he [Kaufmann] had to cut steps in hard and very steep ice for 6 consecutive hours, but he worked most cheerfully and untiringly throughout." Finally, twenty-year-old Reginald Thomas Collins (1880–1918)—who accompanied Herbert Ashley Gaitskell, a surgeon in London at Guy's Hospital, on a climb of the Grosses Schreckhorn (on October 26, 1900)—is typical of Kaufmann's clients when he calls him "a first-class guide." Reginald Collins died in 1918 on a French battlefield during World War I.

== In Canada with Edward Whymper (1901) ==
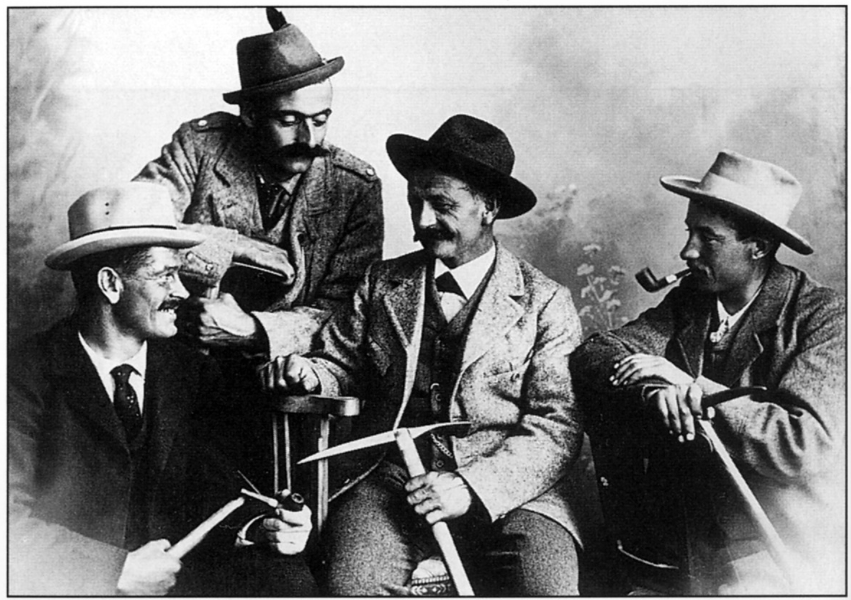
Edward Whymper's guides, Canadian Rockies, 1901. From left to right: Christian Kaufmann, Joseph Bossonay, Christian Klucker, and Joseph Pollinger. Alpine Club Library Collection.

Both Christian and Hans Kaufmann (separately) travelled to Canada in the spring or early summer of 1901 to promote climbing and tourism for the Canadian Pacific Railway (CPR). Whereas Hans guided individual parties in Banff National Park, Christian had special company. In Geneva, on 11 May 1901, he had met Edward Whymper, famous mountaineer, writer, illustrator, and conqueror of the Matterhorn. On behalf of the CPR, Whymper had contacted four Swiss guides (Christian Klucker from Sils; Joseph Pollinger from St. Niklaus; Joseph Bossonney from Chamonix, France; and Christian Kaufmann from Grindelwald) to organize a trip to the Canadian Rockies. As Klucker remarked in his memoir, "The Whymper climbing team for Canada consisted of two solid catholic, married Josephs and two rebellious, single Christians."

Through funding from the CPR, Whymper and his guides stayed in luxury at the Hotel de la Post at Blackfriars in London. Moreover, the Alpine Club and the European Manager of the CPR showed the guides great hospitality during their stay in London. However, a social rift between Whymper and his guides became clear when they boarded the ocean liner Australasian in Liverpool on 23 May 1901 (the ship's maiden voyage): Whymper was a saloon passenger; the guides travelled second class.

The group arrived in Montreal on 2 June 1901, stayed at the Place Viger Hotel for the night, and left for the Rockies on 5 June. The guides travelled in the Colonial rail car, while Whymper and G. W. Franklyn, his photographic assistant, travelled in the sleeping car. The relationship between Whymper and the guides continued to go badly. During the journey, in northern Ontario, for example, there was an issue about a lack of sleeping blankets for the guides, which Whymper failed to remedy. Whymper and Klucker exchanged sharp words; and all four guides were sour at Whymper. On 9 June 1901, the mountaineers arrived in Banff at 5:30 am, after a four-day rail trip from Montreal to Banff by steam train; the entire journey from London to Banff had taken 17 days.

By 18 June 1901, Whymper, G. W. Franklyn, the four guides, the outfitters Bill Peyto and Jack Sinclair headed into the wilderness. Although there were eleven pack-horses, Whymper had not arranged for any porters. This and similar decisions exacerbated the friction between Whymper and his Swiss guides. Whymper "expected them to always be at his beck and call—attending to his whims and commands and acting like porters and bearers. They, on the other hand, were professional mountaineering guides from the Alps, where porters and apprentice guides carried their heavy loads, set up the camps and did the cooking and clean-up duties. Mountain guides safely guided their clients up and down the mountains. They weren't expected to be beasts of burden, cooks, or pot washers."

Humorous mischief: Whymper's liquor bottles with a sarcastic sign that reads, "The Remains of E. Whymper" (1901)

Although Whymper was an accomplished alpinist, artist, lecturer, and writer, his social snobbery, belittling attitude, and excessive consumption of alcohol continued to spark clashes with the guides as well as the outfitters, Wild Bill Peyto and Jack Sinclair. During his excursions, Whymper so frequently ordered cases of whiskey and beer that his drinking became legendary; in stark contrast to the abstinence that the Swiss guides had agreed to in their CPR contracts, Whymper excesses became the object of criticism. In fact, one of the surviving camp photographs from 1901 shows a row of liquor bottles on top of the shipping box; below the crate is a sign, sarcastically written by one of the guides or outfitters, that reads, "The Remains of E. Whymper." Such humorous mischief allowed the guides to vent their displeasure at their leader's arrogance.

Later in mid-August 1901, Whymper's displeasure turned to violence: "Suddenly Whymper's right flew out, connecting with Klucker's jaw, and the Swiss hit the dust. In a jiffy it looked as if the whole four of them were going to take a hand in the fray. We yelled at them to stop, and they did." Whymper reacted with indignation, but, after learning that he might face a trial in the wilderness for assault, Whymper walked over to Klucker and apologized. The guides' further displeasure with Whymper came to a climax in late August, so that the guides went on strike. When asked by Whymper to climb Mt. Stephen (10,495 ft) to take measurements, "Kaufmann and Pollinger ... refused to carry ... the instruments and packs. This was the beginning of an outright revolt by the four guides, and Kaufmann was nominated to be their chief spokesman and negotiator." Kaufmann drafted certain conditions that should govern the rest of the 1901 expedition, and Whymper reluctantly signed.

CPR Mount Stephen House in Field was a home base for many mountaineers.

During their stay at the CPR Mount Stephen Hotel in Field, British Columbia, Whymper's group met Reverend James Outram (1864–1925), an English Vicar and experienced climber, who had come to Canada with his brother to recover from overwork ("a brain collapse"). Outram's sojourn in Canada proved to be far from relaxing; he had begun a strenuous series of ascents guided by Christian Häsler Sr, including Mt. Victoria and Mt. Stephen and first ascents of Mt. Vaux (3,310 m) and Chancellor Peak (3,280 m) in Yoho National Park. In many ways, he was as demanding as Whymper and was often displeased with his guides. In August, the 36-year-old Outram met the 61-year-old Whymper, and the 31-year-old Kaufmann. Whymper invited Outram to join his well-financed and well-equipped group. The newly formed group made two first ascents: On 15 August 1901, Christian Kaufmann, James Outram, Edward Whymper, Christian Klucker, and Joseph Pollinger climbed Mt. Habel (3,161 m / 10,371 ft) and, on 19 August 1901, the same group ascended Mt. Collie (3,143 m / 10,312 ft). On 9 August 1901, Kaufmann made a first ascent of The President (3,123 m (10,246 ft)) with Outram and Pollinger. The day that Kaufmann and Outram climbed four peaks in one day marked the beginning not only of a successful professional partnership but also a strong, respectful friendship. And, although Outram headed south at the end of the season with the Swiss guides Christian Häsler and Christian Bohren to successfully make a first ascent of the "Canadian Matterhorn," Mt. Assiniboine (3,616 m (11,864 ft)), his relationship with Christian Kaufmann made mountaineering history.

== In Canada with James Outram (1902) ==
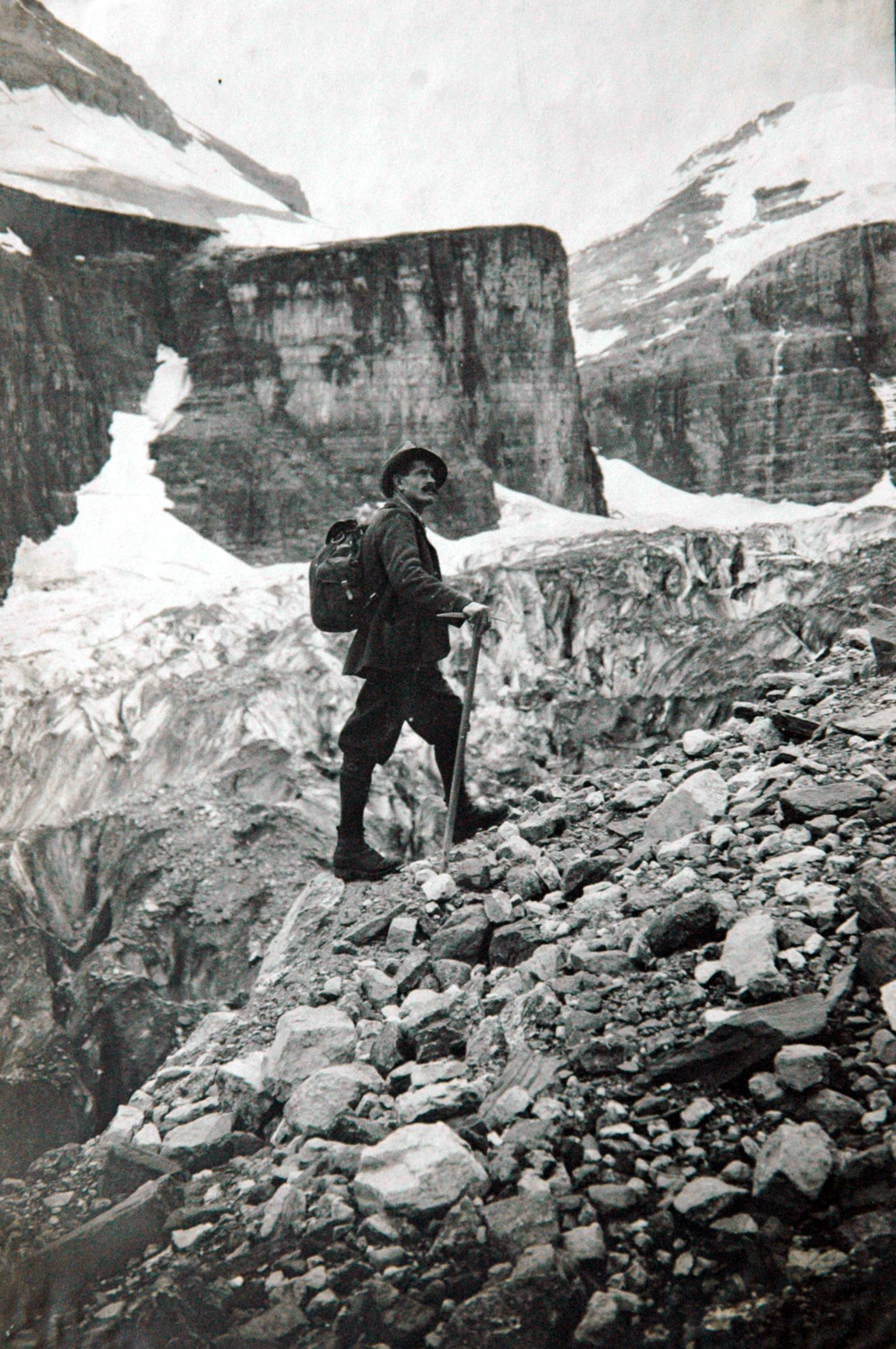
Christian Kaufmann on Victoria Glacier near the "Deathtrap" with Mt. Lefroy (left) and Mt. Victoria (right), c. 1904

Most likely, it was Outram who encouraged Christian Kaufmann to return to Canada a second time in 1902 for more adventurous climbs, and that year proved to be the most productive climbing year in their lives. For eight weeks in July and August 1902, Christian Kaufmann guided James Outram to the summits of ten of the highest peaks in Canadian Rockies, including Mt. Columbia (3,747 m / 12,293 ft), the second highest peak in the Canadian Rockies. At times they travelled from 30 to 80 miles away from the railway lines to the base of mountains. In his entry in Kaufmann's Führerbuch, Outram says that "big climbing commenced on July 19 and between this date & Aug. 26, 10 first ascents of larger peaks were made, several new passes and a considerable quantity of mountain exploration achieved. On all but two occasions Kaufmann & I climbed alone, as my expected companions were unable at the last moment to make the trip, and he is one of a very small number of Swiss guides with whom such an undertaking could be safely carried through, as the conditions were such that only the highest qualities of skill & experience could have achieved—with only two on the rope—without accident or extreme peril on several of the climbs we made. No praise could be too great for his work on Mt. Bryce, whilst on Mt. Forbes and numerous other occasions he had opportunity to demonstrate his quite first-class ability and did so most thoroughly."

The list of first ascents Kaufmann and Outram completed in those six weeks in 1902 is remarkable:

19 July: Mt. Columbia (3,747 m / 12,293 ft); a 22-hour expedition with "ice & snow work throughout."

24 July: Mount Lyell (3,498 m /11,476 ft); 8 hrs. ascent.

30 July: Mt. Kaufmann (3,021 m / 9,911 ft).

31 July: Mons Peak (3,087 m / 10,128 ft); 6 1/2 hrs. ascent.

4 Aug.: Mt. Freshfield (3,337 m / 10,948 ft) with J. N. Collie, H. E. M. Stutfield, G. M. Weed, H. Woolley, and Christian's brother Hans Kaufmann. 8 hrs. ascent.

10 Aug.: Mt. Forbes (3,612 m / 11,850 ft) with Collie, Stutfield, Weed, Woolley, and Hans; 8 1/2 hrs. Outram and Kaufmann "ascented from high bivouac; [Kaufmann doing] "some first-class rock work." On the last 2 peaks, Prof. Collie's party with Hans Kaufmann, joined them. Christian led on Forbes and alternately on Freshfield.

19 Aug.: "Consolation Peak" (Fresnoy Mountain, 3,258 m / 10,689 ft) on the Divide Ridge, west of Mt. Lyell: the same evening they made their way by arêtes, cliffs to Turret Peak (c. 10,500 ft.) and then to Thompson Pass and finally to their Columbia Camp, 18 3/4 hrs.

21 Aug.: Mt. Bryce (3,507 m / 11,506 ft); "from a high bivouac, ascented in 11 hrs.; the snow conditions were very bad; some extremely awkward rock work;" descended the mountain "in the dark." 20 1/2 hrs.

23 Aug.: Mt. Alexandra (3,401 m / 11,158 ft); "8½ hrs. ascent."

26 Aug.: Mt. Wilson (3,260 m / 10,700 ft); "traversed from end to end; 8½ hrs ascent."

Christian Kaufmann climbing in the Canadian Rockies (c. 1903)

Outram's respect for Kaufmann is vividly expressed in his detailed account of climbing Mt. Bryce. On 21 July, in preparation of their climb, the two mountaineers left camp, made their way through forests of fallen trees, chopped-down a big spruce to make "a bridge across the swift torrent," climbed steep, rugged slopes to "delightful" lakes, and finally reached an altitude of 8,000 feet in order to "survey Mt. Bryce and its approaches ... with strong field glasses." On 21 August, they begin their climb at 4:40 in the morning, roped together before tackling the snow wall, and continued thus throughout the day." One 70 feet high cliff "threatened defeat," but "Christian immediately led the way: Hold after hold gave way as [Kaufmann] tried them one by one, and fragments rattled down the gully and leapt from rock to rock in ever growing bounds till, lost to sight and sound, they dashed to final rest upon the glacier 6,000 feet below ... Fortunately Kaufmann is a magnificent rock-climber, and it was a treat to watch the skill and science he displayed in his advance slowly and cautiously towards his goal." Kaufmann, "sometimes with arms and legs outstretched, like great starfish," overcame one difficulty after another "with cat-like tread, face inwards towards the slope." After reaching the 11,750-foot summit, eleven hours later, at 3:40 pm, they spent little time at the top. But they soon realize that the 70 feet of cliff encountered earlier could not be descended before dark. Rather than freezing without shelter in arctic winds during a night, Kaufmann decided to descend the mountain in darkness. Outram, still roped to his guide, went first, and Kaufmann, in the upper, less secure position, moved cautiously down the rocky cliff.

"Drawn out for one long hour of concentrated tension were the successive experiences of helpless groping in the dark depths for something to rest a foot upon, of blind search all over the chilled rocky surface for a knob or tiny crack where the numbed fingers might find another hold, of agonizing doubt as to their stability when found, of eerie thrill and sickening sensation when the long-sought support crumbled beneath the stress and hurtled downward into the blackness of space, whilst the hollow reverberations of its fall reechoed through the silence."

As Outram observed, after "nearly 17 hours of adventurous companionship," the mountaineers finally unloosened the rope that had bound them together.

The outfitter Jimmy Simpson remarked that "'Outram wanted all the glory himself' and claimed that he [Outram] treated his guide Kaufmann as 'just help.'" But these remarks seem doubtful in light of Outram's repeated praise of his guide. In fact, Outram treats Kaufmann's only fault humorously and forgivingly: "We looked forward to a good hot supper, when, to our dismay, it was discovered that we were matchless! Christian, probably for the first time in his career, had omitted to bring a single one—a doubly reprehensible oversight for a habitual smoker."

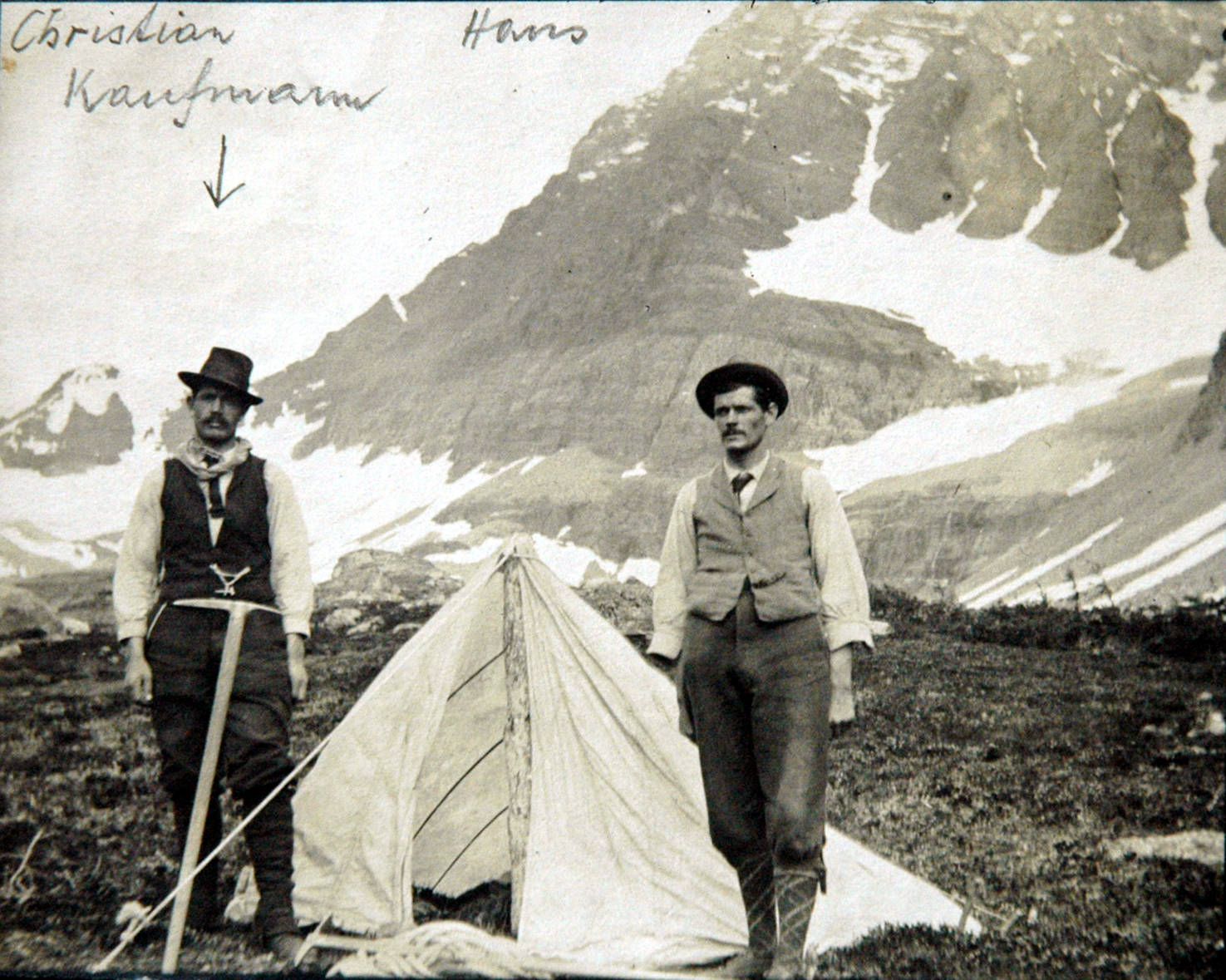
Christian and Hans Kaufmann with tent in Prospector's Valley

Just as many of Outram's triumphs were only possible because of Christian Kaufmann's mountaineering skills, the successes of Outram's rival John Norman Collie (1859–1942) were accomplished primarily because of the professionalism of Christian's brother, Hans Kaufmann. Hans also travelled to Canada for eight weeks in July and August 1902 and had been climbing with Collie's group when, in August 1902, the two groups "combined forces ... to attempt Mount Forbes ... There had been some competition and even animosity between the two when Outram made the first ascent of Mount Columbia following Collie's preparatory exploration of the area. The fine Victorian manners of both gentlemen were demonstrated on this first ascent. At one point Collie, rather than increase the risk to his companions of being the fourth on the rope, abandoned the ascent. After Outram successfully climbed the second cliff, he sent Christian and Hans Kaufmann back down to accompany Collie up the difficult section, feeling that Collie, 'more than all the rest, deserved the gratification and honour of being the first to conquer Mount Forbes'."

Christian Kaufmann made additional climbs in 1902 that deserve mention. On 22 May, he and Christian Häsler guided Walter Weston (1861–1940) and his wife Francis (1872–1937) to the summit of Mt. Stephen; both Westons were experienced mountaineers and are credited with introducing mountain climbing in Japan during the late-nineteenth century. Walter commented that Kaufmann's "strength & skill are only equalled by his care & attention. He well deserves the place he has gained at the top of the tree of his profession." Later in the season (September 1902), Kaufmann took George B. Dorr to the top of Mt. Stephan and across Abbott's Pass. Dorr was an active conservationist and noted philanthropist who is credited with the establishment of Acadia National Park.

== Further climbing in Canada (1903–1906) ==
Kaufmann made four more trips to Canada for the CPR (1903, 1904, 1905, and 1906). In April 1904, he crossed the Atlantic aboard the Lake Champlain with five fellow guides, Edward Feuz, Christian Häsler, Christian Bohren, Friedrich Michel, and his brother Hans Kaufmann. In 1905, he travelled with three of the Feuz guides, Edward, Sr.; Edward, Jr.; and Fritz Michael. Finally, in 1906, he sailed with Edward and Gottfried Feuz on the Lake Manitoba.

On 29 June 1903, Gertrude Lowthian Bell, the world explorer, climbed with Christian and Hans expressing regret that the weather at Field, B.C., was so poor that it prevented her from any challenging climbs with Christian, who "has done so much pioneering work in this country that it would be difficult to find a better guide." She hoped to meet him again for further climbs in Grindelwald.

1903 was another very active year for Christian, including several first ascents:

- 16 July 1903: Mt. Goodsir (3,567 m / 11,703 ft), the highest peak of the

Ottertail group, with Charles E. Fay, Herschel C. Parker, and Christian Häsler.

- 21 July 1903: Mt. Hungabee (3,492 m / 11,457 ft) with Herschel C. Parker and his brother, Hans Kaufmann.
- 1 September 1903: Mt. Deltaform (3,424 m / 11,234 ft) with August Eggers, Herschel C. Parker, and his brother, Hans Kaufmann.
- 3 September 1903: Mt. Biddle (3,320 m / 10,890 ft) with August Eggers, Herschel C. Parker, and his brother, Hans Kaufmann.

Herschel C. Parker (1867–1931), a physicist at Columbia University, enjoyed not only the challenge of his first ascents but also gave a scientific dimension to his climbs with Kaufmann. He commented in Kaufmann's Führerbuch: "On our return from Mt. Hungabee we climbed Mt. Temple from Moraine Lake and made determination of the altitude with the Hypsometer ... on all the peaks I had the kind interest and assistance of Christian Kaufmann in my scientific observations."

Christian Kaufmann next to a cairn, a human-made pile of stones, indicating to others that climbers had reached the mountain's summit (c. 1905)

On 5 June 1904, Christian and Hans Kaufmann guided John Duncan Patterson, later the third president of the Alpine Club of Canada, to a first ascent of 3,311 m (10,863 ft) high Mount Ball. The following month they guided Hudson Stuck, Archdeacon of Alaska and future first ascendant of Denali, on Mt. Victoria.
In 1904, at the Chalet Lake Louise, the brothers also met Gertrude Emily Benham, an English mountaineer and traveler, who had climbed many Alpine peaks in her youth with her father. She employed both Kaufmanns and climbed numerous peaks with them: Mts. Lefroy, Victoria, Whyte, Stephen, Temple, Assiniboine, as well as Pope's Peak, Yamnee Peak, Shappee Peak, and an unknown summit; four were first ascents. One of their most strenuous expeditions took place in late August 1904. Leaving Lake Louise at midnight, Benham and the Kaufmanns crossed Abbott Pass, descended to Lake O'Hara, making their way along Cataract Valley to the summit of Mt. Stephen, reaching the top at 7:30 pm, and, finally, descending after dark to the town of Field, arriving at 3:00 am, 27 hours after leaving Lake Louise.

The first ascent of Mt. Heejee by Christian Kaufmann and Gertrude Benham was more controversial. They set out on 20 July 1904; however, on the same day, Hans Kaufmann and Professor Charles Ernest Fay (1846–1931) also attempted to climb the mountain by a more difficult route. Christian and Benham were successful, but Hans and Fay had to abandon the climb due to snowy conditions. To honor his accomplishments, Fay, a respected mountaineer, had been promised that Heejee Peak (#1) would be named in his honor by the Geographic Board of Canada, and he wanted to be the first to climb the mountain, which was to bear his name. Fay was angered that he had been beaten to the top and suspected that the Kaufmann brothers had played a trick on him. Fay was emphatic that he had been misled: "I should have probably made the first ascent of the new Mt. Fay which I missed by Hans Kaufmann's leading me, against my protest, up Consolation Valley, while Christian led Miss Benham around by the familiar ‘Hourglass Couloir' to its virgin summit." He accused the Kaufmanns of conspiracy and demanded that the CPR dismiss them. In the end, Hans Kaufmann's contract was not renewed, and, at the end of the 1904 season, he ended guiding in Canada. Christian continued working for the CPR until the end of the 1906 season.

Whether Christian and Hans really did conspire to deny Fay the first ascent of "his" mountain remains unclear due to a lack of primary evidence. Birrell does say that "the Kaufmann brothers had a reputation for playing practical jokes." Indeed, Christian may well have had a role in "The Remains of Edward Whymper" prank played on the famous English mountaineer (see above) in 1901. And Edward Feuz, Jr., was convinced about the deception and viewed the two Kaufmann with great disfavor. However, Feuz' version of the events should be viewed skeptically, since he may have been jealous of the popularity and successes of the Kaufmanns, especially their independence, genial nature, English fluency, and above-average gratuities from clients.

On 15 September 1904, Henrietta L. Tuzo climbed Mt. Victoria with Kaufmann, saying she hoped "to do further ascents with him another season." And, indeed, she and Christian Kaufmann climbed Mt. Collie (10,315 ft.) on 12 July 1906, and, on 21 July, they were the first to stand on "the summit of Peak Seven (Shagowa; 3,245 m) above Alberta's Moraine Lake ... Peak Seven was later named Mount Tuzo in her honour."

== In the Himalayas with A. M. Kellas (1907) ==
Sinioichu, Simvo, and Kangchen- junga viewed from the Zemu Glacier near Green Lake where Kellas and Kaufmann camped in 1907. Photo: Vittorio Sella. 1899.

After six climbing seasons (1901–1906) in Canada, Christian Kaufmann (with his brother Fritz) travelled to Sikkim, India, in August 1907 to climb with Alexander Mitchell Kellas (1868–1921), a Scottish mountaineer and physiologist who was interested in studying the causes of altitude sickness. Neither Kellas nor the Swiss had been in the Himalayas before, although Kellas was to make seven more trips to the region. The expedition, including the two Kaufmanns, left Srinagar (5,200 ft.) in the Kashmir Valley on 3 August 1907, heading for "the most stupendous mountain barrier in the world." Kellas said his objective "was to explore the glaciers of Kangchenjunga, and ascend any mountains of the region which might prove accessible." And he wanted to do scientific work "in connection with variations in the composition of the atmosphere at high altitudes, and alterations in the relative numbers the red and white corpuscles in blood," what he called "mountain lassitude" or altitude sickness. After experiencing difficulties crossing the Pir Panjal mountain range and fording the swollen Rembiara River, they crossed Pir Panjal Pass (11,400 ft.) and encountered several other rivers with flood conditions. On 12 August, one of the Kaufmanns was "unwell" and stayed at a "rest-house near Naoshera," but he finally returned to Srinagar, while Kellas and the others travelled on to Darjeeling, visiting the Kangchenjunga glacier along the way.

On 8 September 1907, the Kaufmanns guided Kellas in an attempt to reach the summit of Simvu (22,800 ft.), but, encountering a snowstorm, they were forced to abandon the climb at 19,000 feet. Two days later they attempted the summit again, but the Kaufmanns again abandoned the ascent, considering the snow too dangerous at 20,700 feet. A third attempt on 30 September that began at 2 am and involved crossing the Zemu glacier by moonlight was also abandoned because of deep, soft snow and inclement weather at 20,000 feet. In his various reports to the Alpine Club (London), Kellas says that the Kaufmanns turned back because of heavy snow and storms. Although he later explains that the Swiss guides were unsatisfactory, he never directly says the Kaufmanns suffered from altitude sickness; however, Himalaya summits are predominantly over 20,000 feet, and the Kaufmanns were accustomed to heights of 10,000 to 16,000 feet, so that Swiss guides were not as acclimatized to such heights as the native sherpas.

== In the Bernese and Pennine Alps (1908–1911) ==
Christian Kaufmann (middle) and clients enjoy a mountain-side meal during a climb.

Many of Kaufmann's clients used his services as a guide on repeated occasions. Freeman Allen (1870–1930), for example, climbed with Kaufmann in the Canadian Rockies (e.g., Mt. Victoria), the Bernese Oberland (e.g., Jungfrau and Mönch in June 1908, with Christian's brother Fritz Kaufmann), and the seven weeks (from 20 June to 10 August 1909) in the Valais, ascending 9 peaks, including Monte Rosa, Lyskamm, and Aigille du Grépon. Allen, grandson of Harriet Beecher Stowe, was "one of the foremost authorities on the use of anesthetics" and worked in Cuba with General Leonard Wood on the causes and prevention of yellow fever. J. Duke Smith, a fellow Alpine enthusiast from Boston, often join Allen and Kaufmann (e.g., Matterhorn, Rothorn, and the "High-level Route from Chamonix to Zermatt"). He comments that "whatever I have learned about the mountains I owe to Christian." The Sanders family—Harry, Jack, Cathi, and Helen—from London made rigorous climbs with Kaufmann in 1908 and 1909. On 26 June 1908, Ethel Reddan (Hampstead, London), a member of the Ladies Alpine Club, climbed the Wetterhorn as well as the Little and Big Schreckhorn with Kaufmann.

On 20 April 1911, 39-year-old Christian Kaufmann married Emma Christen (born 1881 in Herzogenbuchsee). They later had three children: Johann (1914, died in infancy), Hans Wilhelm (1916–1942), and Christian Alexander.

== In Switzerland and Norway with J. W. S. Brady (1911–1912) ==
As Kaufmann's client "for almost the whole summer" on more than 25 exploits in the Bernese and Pennine Alps, John W. S. Brady from Baltimore filled several pages (15 October 1911) in Kaufmann's Führerbuch. In July 1911, Christian's brother Hans joined Brady in a climb of the Klein Scheckhorn over the Upper Grindelwald Glacier of the Lauteraarsattel-Route. Brady also recorded that "Christian, my friend and guide, was with me last March [1912] in Norway." Although the weather was not favorable that year, Christian guided Brady to two Norwegian summits: Ruten (4974 ft)in Oppland near Fefor, Nautgardstind (7,600 ft.) near Bessheim. During that summer, they also climbed five peaks in the Maderanertal in the Canton Uri: Gross Windgällen (10, 459 ft.), Oberalpstock (10,919 ft.), Claridenstock (10,722 ft.), Scheerhorn (10, 810 ft.), Gross Ruchen (10,265 ft); and, in the South Tyrol, the two highest peaks of the Ortler Alps, Königspitz (12,655 ft.) and Ortler (12, 811 ft.).

== Later climbs (1913–1930) ==
At the age of 41, Christian Kaufmann reduced his climbing activities. The entries in his Führerbuch are limited to climbs in the Bernese Oberland, and, with the completion of the railway to the Jungfraujoch in 1912, Kaufmann and other guides began their tours at the 11,332-foot rail terminus. Otto (New York City) and Robert P. Koenig (Cambridge, Mass.), for instance, began their August 1925 tour across the Aletschglacier to the Konkordia Hut and the Finsteraarhorn summit from the rail station. Kaufmann continued to receive praise as a careful, first-rate guide and a pleasant, entertaining companion, who proved to be "an excellent teacher of beginners." Appropriately enough the last testimony in the Führerbuch (June 18, 1930) by Arthur Burton mentions Kaufmann's "son, the younger Christian, [who] took Mrs. Burton and me to the top of the Jungfrau and then on to the Concordia Hut and the Eggishorn."

== Retirement in Grindelwald and final years (1931–1939) ==
Christian Kaufmann with his dog Prinz in Grindelwald (1930s)

Although there are no climbing testimonies in Christian's Führerbuch after 1930, the eight final official entries show that he kept his climbing certificate current until his death. Moreover, there are entries in Alpine publications indicating that he was still actively climbing two years before his death. In fact, in July 1937, at age 64, he was snowed-in for 36 hours at the Dossen hut with his client Claude Wilson. As Häsler notes in his tribute to Kaufmann, "It was the last walk in the mountains for both of them."

Kaufmann and his family had lived in Grindelwald, auf dem Hubel, but moved closer to the village (Spätenmatte) in 1930. Häsler recalls that he "met Christen Kaufmann in late autumn of 1938, smiling and as merry as ever, tramping down a dripping hillside at Grindelwald, under a big blue umbrella."

Kaufmann died on 12 January 1939. His death was announced in a New York Times obituary: "Christian Kaufmann, Swiss guide, who was well-known in Canada for his mountain-climbing feats died at the age of 66. He also took part in expeditions in the Himalayas." Funeral services were held on 15 January 1939, and Christian was laid to rest in the Grindelwald cemetery.

== Legacy ==
Christian Kaufmann belonged to an age of mountaineering when it was still customary to accompany a client to different countries and continents. Kaufmann established an international reputation as a superior mountain guide who deserves not only "a special place amongst the giants of Canadian mountaineering" but also among the greatest of Alpine climbers. He received not only the praise of accomplished mountaineers for this unparalleled knowledge, strength, and endurance but also the respect of novices for his patience and teaching skills.

In an age, when mountaineering was "a demonstration of masculinity" and when men feared that the "weaker sex" might "prove themselves capable of the same feats," Kaufmann gave women climbers equal social and professional recognition. He welcomed female climbers and thereby advanced their struggle toward gender equality.

In recognition of his superior mountaineering and many first ascents in Canada, Christian was honored by having several Canadian landmarks officially named in his honor. In 1903, James Outram suggested that a mountain with twin summits in the lower Mistaya valley of Alberta be officially called the Kaufmann Peaks in honor of Christian (10,200 ft.) and Hans (10,151 ft.). Professor Herschel C. Parker of Columbia University proposed that a lake west of Chimney Peak in British Columbia be named Kaufmann Lake; they had camped overnight at this lake while ascending Mount Deltaform in 1903. Finally, in Alberta, there is a smaller Kaufmann Lake near Kaufmann Creek, a tributary steam that flows into the Mistaya River near Saskatchewan River Crossing.
