= The President (mountain) =

Mountain in British Columbia, Canada

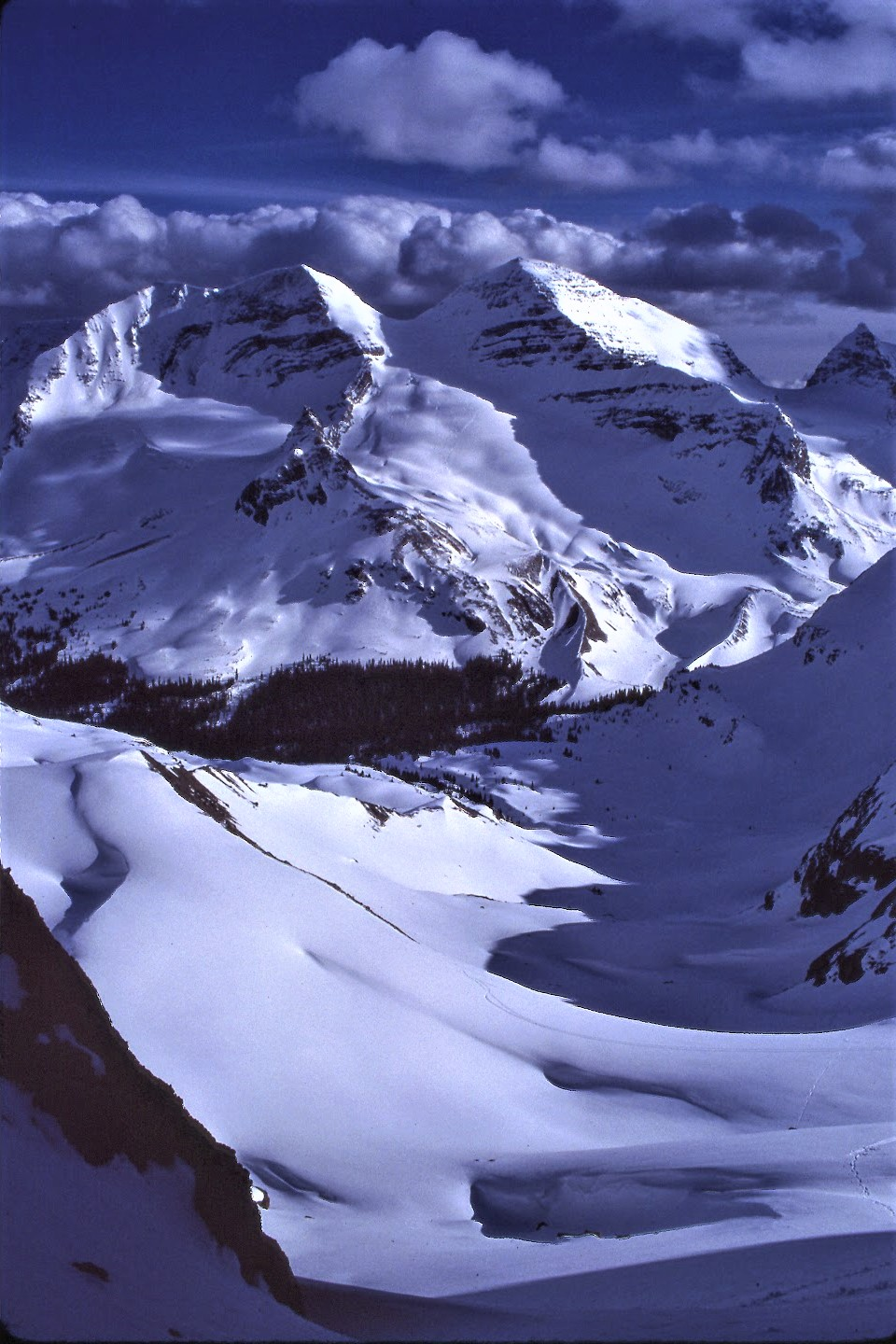
- The Vice President & The President (l-r) from isolated col (skiout to Stanley Mitchell hut)

Highest point
- Elevation: 3,123 m (10,246 ft)
- Prominence: 653 m (2,142 ft) (above Kiwetinok Pass)
- Listing: Mountains of British Columbia
- Coordinates: 51°30′02″N 116°33′42″W

Geography
- Location within British Columbia
- Country: Canada
- Province: British Columbia
- District: Kootenay Land District
- Parent range: President Range; Canadian Rockies
- Topo map: NTS 82N10 Blaeberry River

Climbing
- First ascent: 1901 by James Outram, Christian Kaufmann and Joseph Pollinger
- Easiest route: scramble

The President is a mountain peak on The President/Vice-President Massif of the President Range, in eastern British Columbia. It is just north of Emerald Lake in Yoho National Park, near the Alpine Club of Canada's Stanley Mitchell hut.

== History ==
The President was named Shaugnessy in 1904 by Edward Whymper after Thomas Shaugnessy, the president of the Canadian Pacific Railway. In 1907, the mountain was renamed by the Alpine Club of Canada, after it was discovered that the name had already been used on a mountain in the Selkirks.

== Climate ==
Based on the Köppen climate classification, The President is located in a subarctic climate with cold, snowy winters, and mild summers. Temperatures can drop below −20 C with wind chill factors below −30 C.

== See also ==
- List of mountains in the Canadian Rockies

== Gallery ==
Left to right, The Vice President, President Glacier and The President
