= Mount GEC =

Mountain in Alberta, Canada

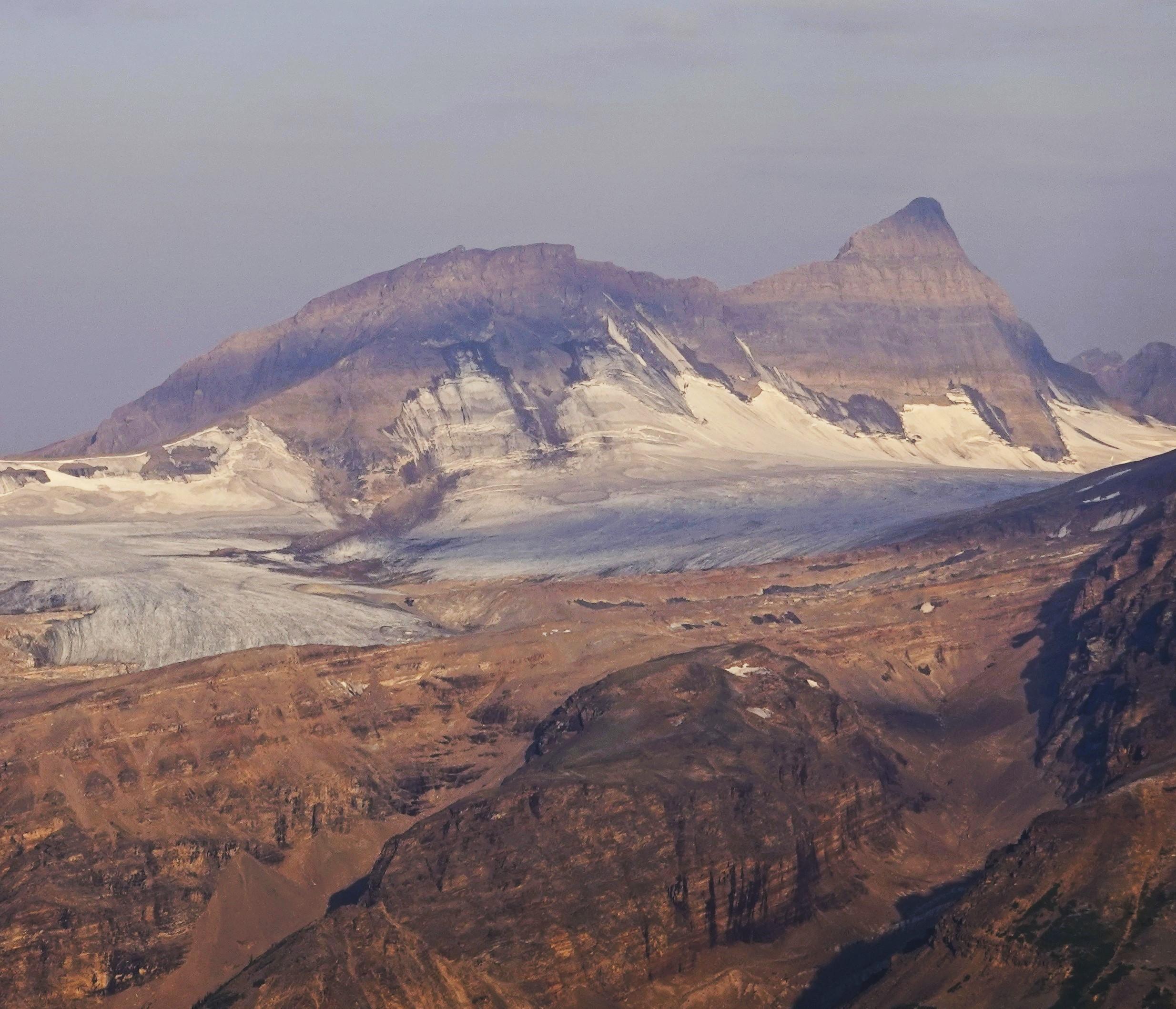
- East aspect

Highest point
- Elevation: 3,220 m (10,560 ft) (Note: Other sources state 3130 m.)
- Prominence: 400 m (1,300 ft)
- Parent peak: Mount Smythe (3246 m)
- Listing: Mountains of Alberta
- Coordinates: 52°20′11″N 117°27′00″W

Geography
- Location within Alberta
- Country: Canada
- Province: Alberta
- Protected area: Jasper National Park
- Parent range: Winston Churchill Range
- Topo map: NTS 83C6 Sunwapta Peak

Climbing
- First ascent: 1948 by George Harr, Ellen Wilts, Chuck Wilts
- Easiest route: rock/snow climb

Mount GEC is a mountain located in the Sunwapta River Valley of Jasper National Park. Gec lies 4 km (2 mi) northwest of Diadem Peak. The mountain was named in 1961 after the first names of the three climbers who made the first ascent — George, Ellen, and Chuck.

== See also ==
- List of mountains in the Canadian Rockies
