= Mount Mitchell (Alberta) =

Mountain in Jasper National Park, Alberta, Canada

- Location within Alberta

Highest point
- Elevation: 3,040 m (9,970 ft)
- Prominence: 183 m (600 ft)
- Parent peak: Mount Adam Joachim (3094 m)
- Listing: Mountains of Alberta
- Coordinates: 52°24′12″N 117°30′13″W

Geography
- Country: Canada
- Province: Alberta
- Protected area: Jasper National Park
- Parent range: Winston Churchill Range
- Topo map: NTS 83C5 Fortress Lake

Mount Mitchell is a mountain located within the Sunwapta River valley of Jasper National Park, Canada, 3 kilometres (1.9 mi) southeast of Mount Morden Long.

Mt. Mitchell was named in 1970 for J.H. Mitchell who was an engineer for the Department of the Interior. Mitchell oversaw the construction of the Icefields Parkway from Jasper to the Banff-Jasper boundary.
