= Winston Churchill Range =

Mountain range in Western Canada

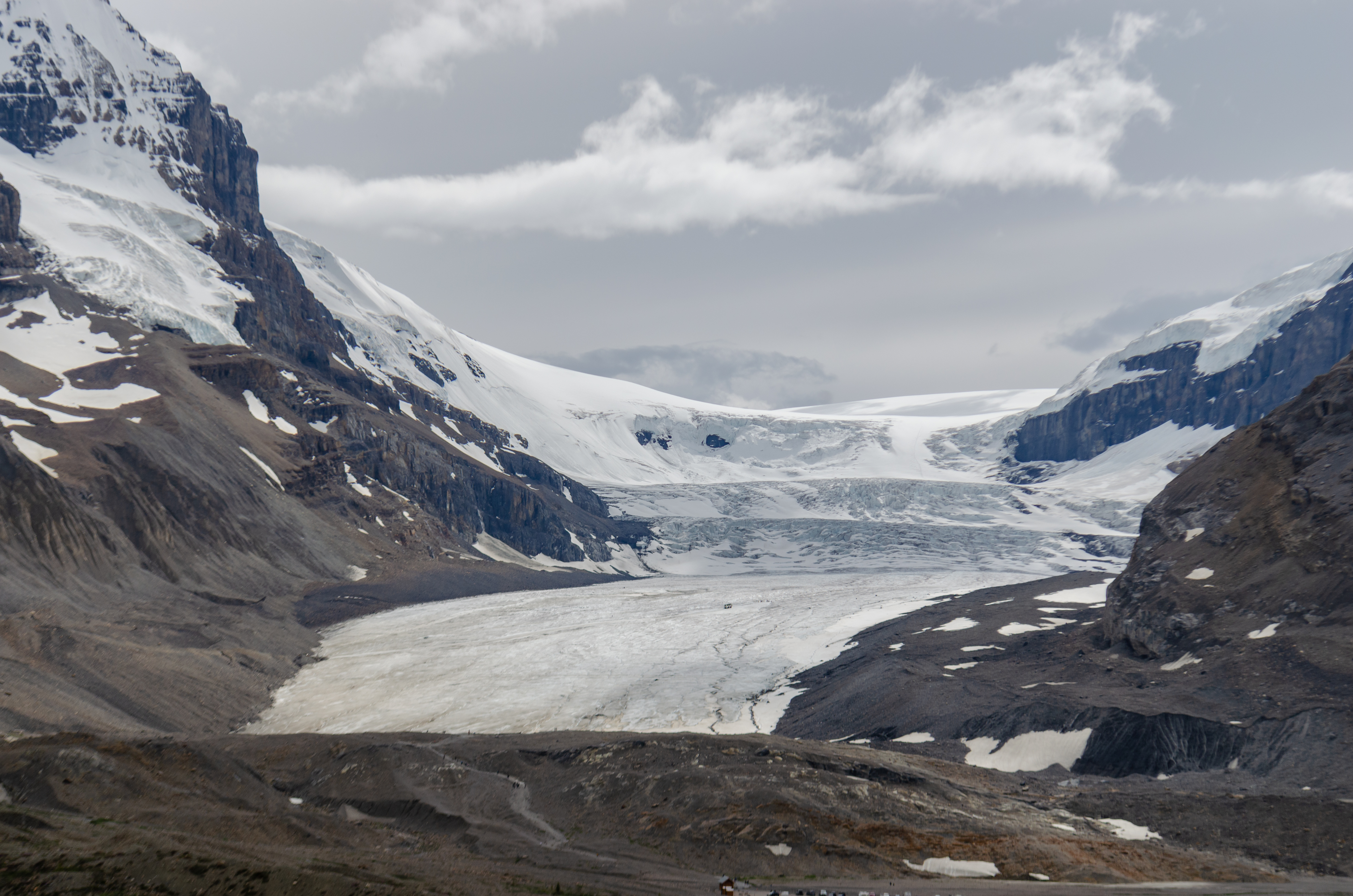
- Athabasca Glacier in the Winston Churchill Range

Highest point
- Peak: Mount Columbia
- Elevation: 3,747 m (12,293 ft)
- Listing: Mountains of Alberta
- Coordinates: 52°08′51″N 117°26′26″W

Dimensions
- Length: 31 km (19 mi) N/S
- Width: 23 km (14 mi) E/W
- Area: 410 km^{2} (160 mi^{2})

Naming
- Etymology: Winston Churchill

Geography
- Location within British Columbia Location within Alberta
- Country: Canada
- Provinces: British Columbia; Alberta
- Protected area: Jasper National Park
- Range coordinates: 52°21′32″N 117°26′58″W
- Parent range: Park Ranges
- Topo map: NTS 83C6 Sunwapta Peak

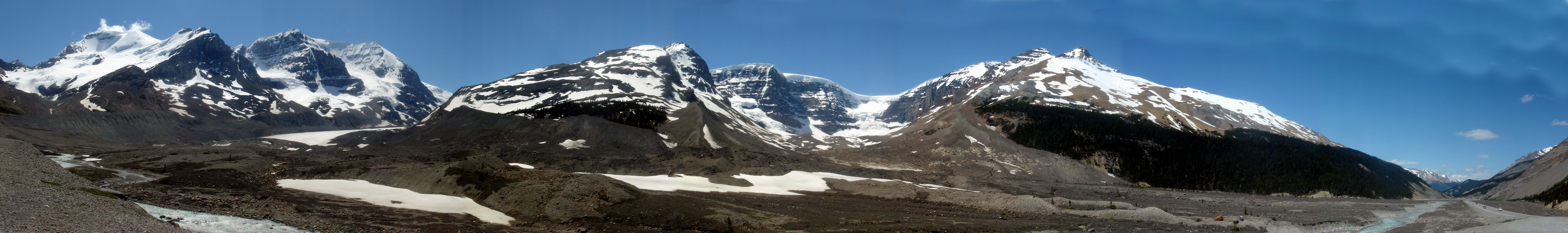
Mount Athabasca, Mount Andromeda, Athabasca Glacier, Snow Dome, Dome Glacier and Mount Kitchener

The Winston Churchill Range is a mountain range in the central section of the Park Ranges of the Canadian Rockies located in Jasper National Park. The range was named after Sir Winston Churchill, former British prime minister.

The eastern boundary of the range begins on the western side of Sunwapta River from the Jasper and Banff boundary and extends north to Sunwapta Falls. The western boundary of the range is defined by the Athabasca River valley to the east of Warwick Mountain. The valley narrows as it approaches the Continental Divide, and separates Mt. Columbia from Mt. King Edward, the latter of which is not part of the range.

== List of mountains ==
This range includes the following mountains and peaks:

Mountain / Peak	Elevation		Prominence		FA	Coordinates
Mountain / Peak	m	ft	m	ft	FA	Coordinates
Mount Columbia	3,747	12,293	2,383	7,818	1902	52°8′51″N 117°26′26″W
North Twin Peak	3,730	12,240	1,010	3,310	1923	52°13′25″N 117°26′3″W
Mount Alberta	3,619	11,873	819	2,687	1925	52°17′14″N 117°28′37″W
South Twin Peak	3,566	11,699	341	1,119	1924	52°12′14″N 117°26′5″W
Mount Kitchener	3,505	11,499	280	920	1927	52°13′3″N 117°19′12″W
Snow Dome	3,456	11,339	171	561	1898	52°11′17″N 117°19′1″W
Stutfield Peak	3,450	11,320	290	950	1927	52°14′18″N 117°24′27″W
Mount Woolley	3,405	11,171	565	1,854	1925	52°17′50″N 117°25′31″W
Mount Cromwell	3,380	11,090	360	1,180	1936	52°16′8″N 117°23′35″W
Diadem Peak	3,371	11,060	211	692	1898	52°18′38″N 117°25′15″W
Mount Engelhard	3,270	10,730	210	690	1930	52°16′31″N 117°24′25″W
Mount Smythe	3,246	10,650	420	1,380	1951	52°21′20″N 117°28′30″W
Mount GEC	3,220	10,560	400	1,300	1948	52°20′11″N 117°27′0″W
Mushroom Peak	3,210	10,530	270	890	1947	52°18′42″N 117°23′50″W
Mount Nelson	3,180	10,430	240	790	1951	52°20′46″N 117°28′10″W
Thorington Tower	3,155	10,351	275	902	1967	52°21′27″N 117°30′10″W
Mount Palmer	3,150	10,330	270	890	1953	52°21′10″N 117°31′14″W
Gong Peak	3,120	10,240	280	920	1936	52°22′11″N 117°27′33″W
Mount Weiss	3,120	10,240	210	690	1971	52°23′28″N 117°28′30″W
Mount Adam Joachim	3,090	10,140	440	1,440	1938	52°24′16″N 117°31′40″W
Mount K2	3,090	10,140			Unk	52°13′30″N 117°17′31″W
Mount Mitchell	3,040	9,970	183	600	1970	52°24′12″N 117°30′13″W
Mount Morden Long	3,040	9,970	360	1,180	Unk	52°25′21″N 117°32′17″W
Mount McGuire	3,030	9,940	130	430	1971	52°22′28″N 117°27′7″W
Mount Confederation	2,969	9,741	429	1,407	1947	52°24′13″N 117°34′35″W
Little Alberta	2,956	9,698	250	820	1924	52°16′26″N 117°26′17″W
