= Sunwapta =

Sunwapta is a Nakoda (Stoney) word meaning "turbulent river" or "radiating waves", and may refer to the following features in Alberta, Canada:

- Sunwapta Falls
- Sunwapta Pass
- Sunwapta Peak
- Sunwapta River
- Sunwapta Industrial, in Edmonton, see List of neighbourhoods in Edmonton#Industrial districts
