= Mount Weiss =

Mountain in Alberta, Canada

- Location within Alberta

Highest point
- Elevation: 3,120 m (10,240 ft) (Note: Other sources state 3090 m.)
- Prominence: 210 m (690 ft)
- Parent peak: Gong Peak (3120 m)
- Listing: Mountains of Alberta
- Coordinates: 52°23′28″N 117°28′30″W

Geography
- Country: Canada
- Province: Alberta
- Protected area: Jasper National Park
- Parent range: Winston Churchill Range
- Topo map: NTS 83C6 Sunwapta Peak

Climbing
- First ascent: 1971 by Mr. & Mrs. H.L. Fuhrer, B. Martin
- Easiest route: Rock/snow climb

Mount Weiss is a mountain in Alberta, Canada located on the western side of the Sunwapta River valley of Jasper National Park, and is part of the Winston Churchill Range. The mountain was named in 1972 after Joe Weiss (1896-1993), who had spent 45 years of his life exploring and guiding in Jasper.

== See also ==
- List of mountains in the Canadian Rockies
- Geography of Alberta
