= Tangle Ridge =

Mountain ridge in Jasper NP, Alberta, Canada

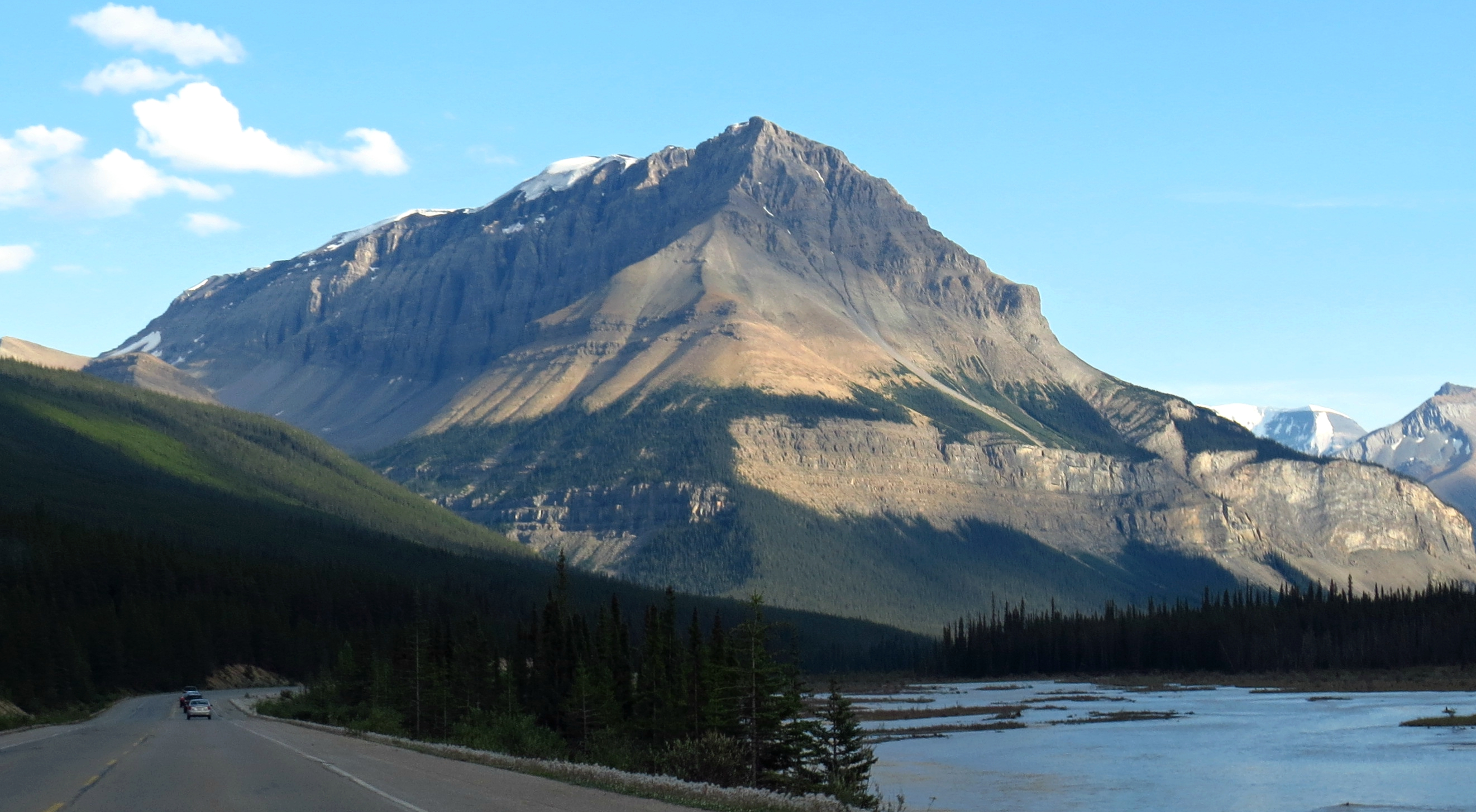
- Tangle Ridge seen from the Icefields Parkway

Highest point
- Elevation: 3,001 m (9,846 ft)
- Prominence: 460 m (1,510 ft)
- Parent peak: Nigel Peak (3211 m)
- Listing: Mountains of Alberta
- Coordinates: 52°18′00″N 117°16′54″W

Geography
- Location within Alberta Location within Canada
- Interactive map of Tangle Ridge
- Country: Canada
- Province: Alberta
- Protected area: Jasper National Park
- Parent range: Canadian Rockies
- Topo map: NTS 83C6 Sunwapta Peak

Geology
- Rock type: Sedimentary

Climbing
- Easiest route: Scramble

Tangle Ridge is a 3,001-metre (9,846 ft) mountain summit located in Jasper National Park, in the Canadian Rockies of Alberta, Canada. Tangle Ridge is situated south of Beauty Creek and north of Tangle Creek, in the Sunwapta River valley. Topographic relief is significant as the summit rises 1,200 metres (3,937 ft) above Beauty Creek in 2 km (1.2 mi). Views from the top of Tangle Ridge provide photographers with an opportunity to capture the peaks surrounding the Columbia Icefield, some of which, such as Mount Columbia and Mount Alberta, are otherwise hidden from view along the Icefields Parkway.

== History ==
The mountain was named by Mary Schäffer in 1907 for the difficulty that climbers had descending down Tangle Creek from the ridge. The mountain's toponym was officially adopted in 1935 by the Geographical Names Board of Canada.

== Climate ==
Based on the Köppen climate classification, Tangle Ridge is located in a subarctic climate zone with cold, snowy winters, and mild summers. Winter temperatures can drop below −20 °C (−4 °F) with wind chill factors below −30 °C (−22 °F). Weather conditions during winter make Tangle Ridge one of the better places in the Rockies for ice climbing. Precipitation runoff from Tangle Ridge drains into the Sunwapta River which is a tributary of the Athabasca River.

== Geology ==
Tangle Ridge is composed of sedimentary rock laid down from the Precambrian to Jurassic periods. Formed in shallow seas, this sedimentary rock was pushed east and over the top of younger rock during the Laramide orogeny.

== Ice Climbing Routes ==
Ice Climbing Routes with grades on Tangle Ridge:

- Shades of Beauty – WI4
- Tangle Falls – WI2-3
- The Stage – WI3-4
- The Wings – WI3-4
- Curtain Call – WI6
- Cyber Pasty Memorial – WI5+
- Melt Out – WI3
- Rick Blak Memorial Route – WI5

== Tangle Falls ==
Tangle Falls is a multi-tiered cascade that might be the most often photographed waterfall alongside the Icefields Parkway because of its easy access. Height: 30 metres (98 ft) Width: 12 metres (39 ft) Coordinates: N 52° 16.035 W 117° 17.197

== Gallery ==
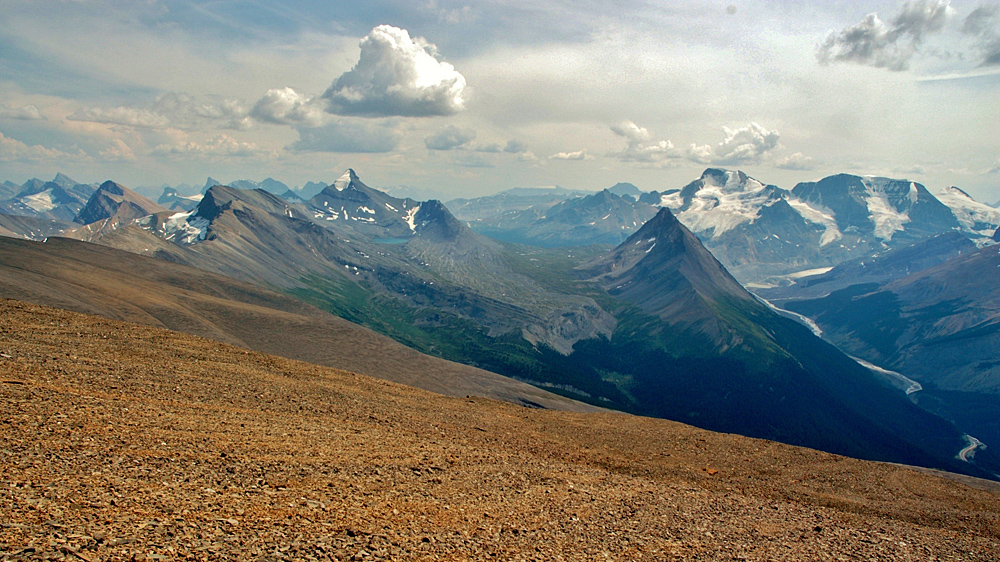
View looking south from Tangle Ridge

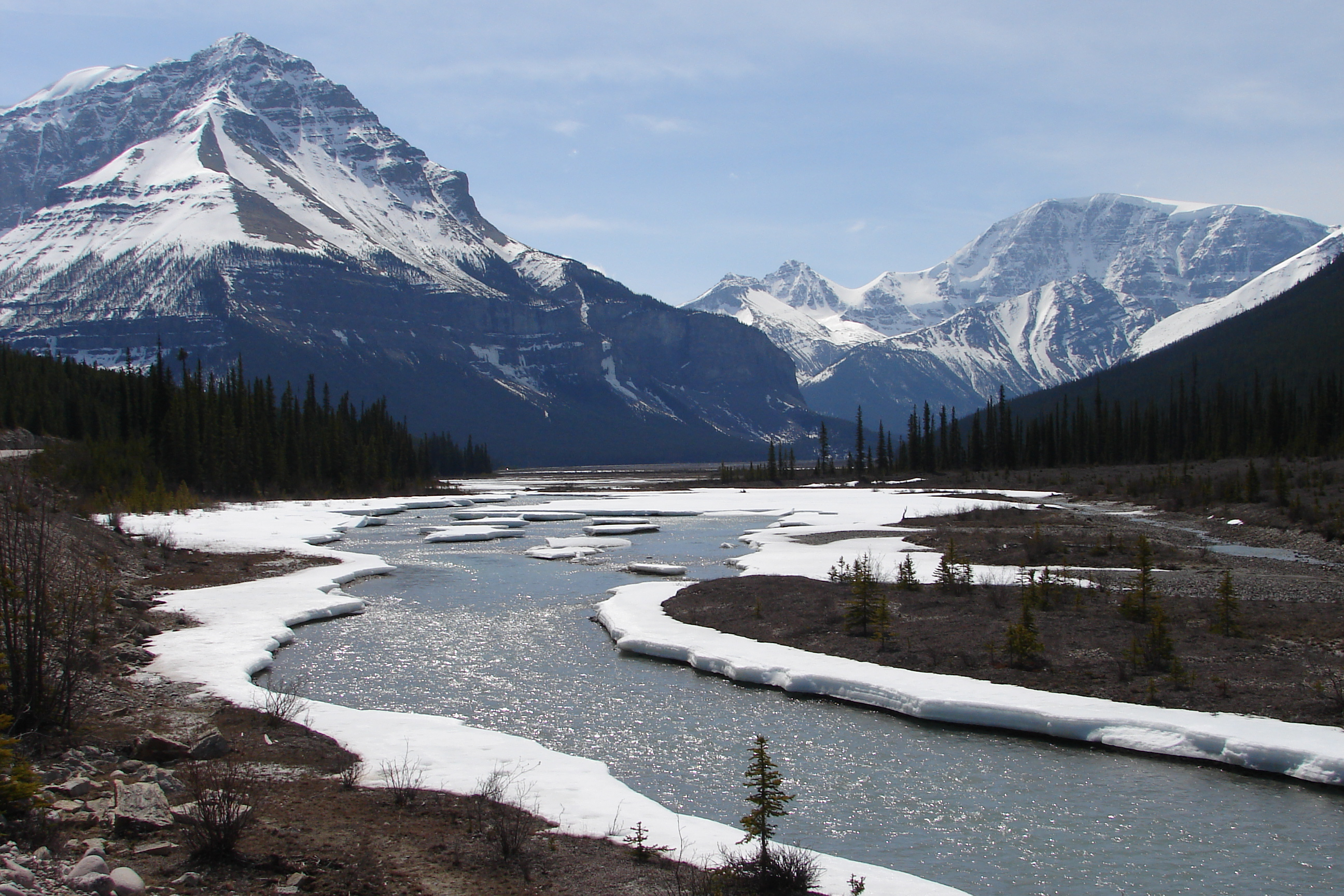
Tangle Ridge (left), Mt. Kitchener (right) and Sunwapta River as seen from the Icefields Parkway

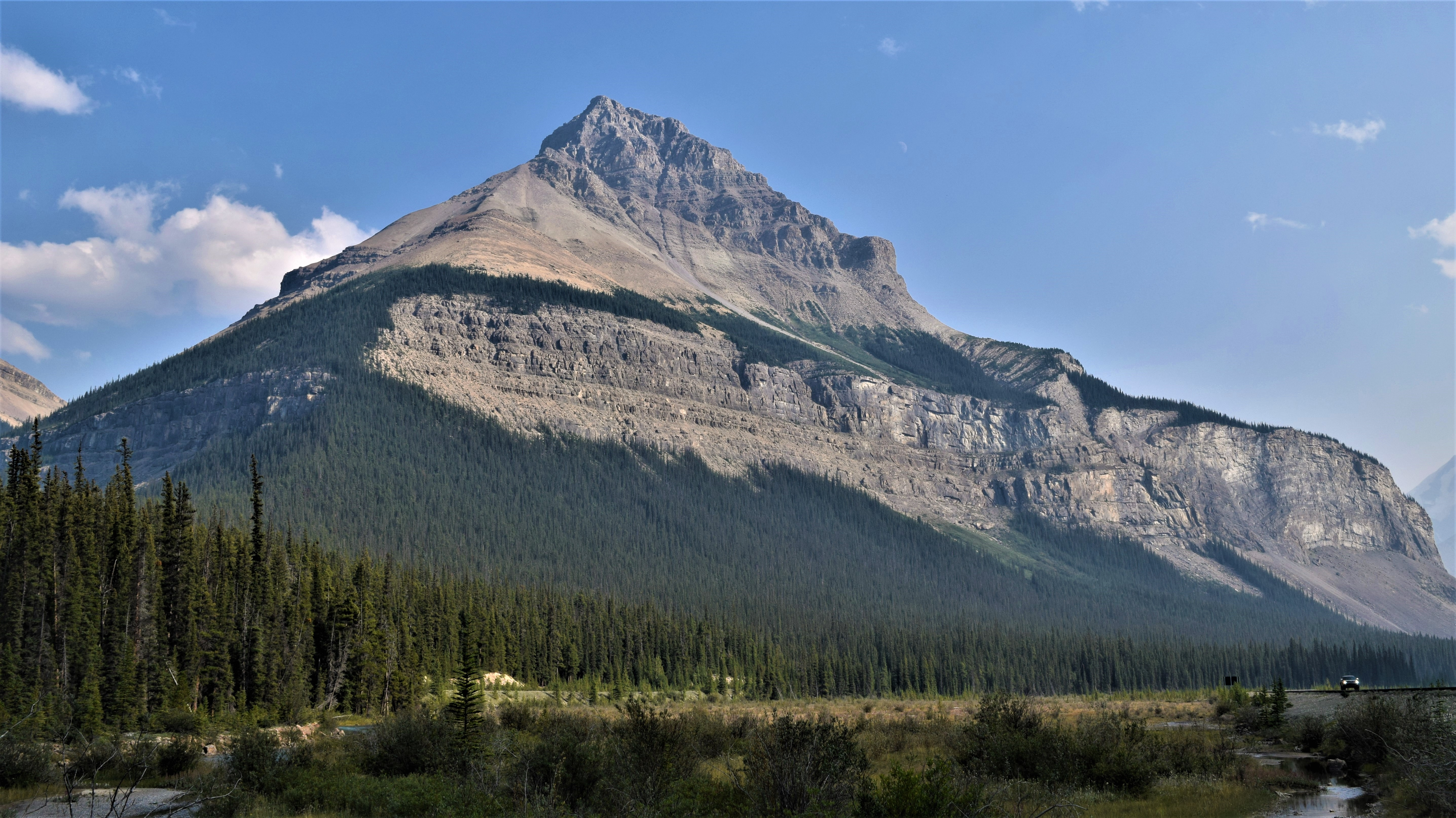
Northwest aspect of Tangle Ridge from Icefields Parkway

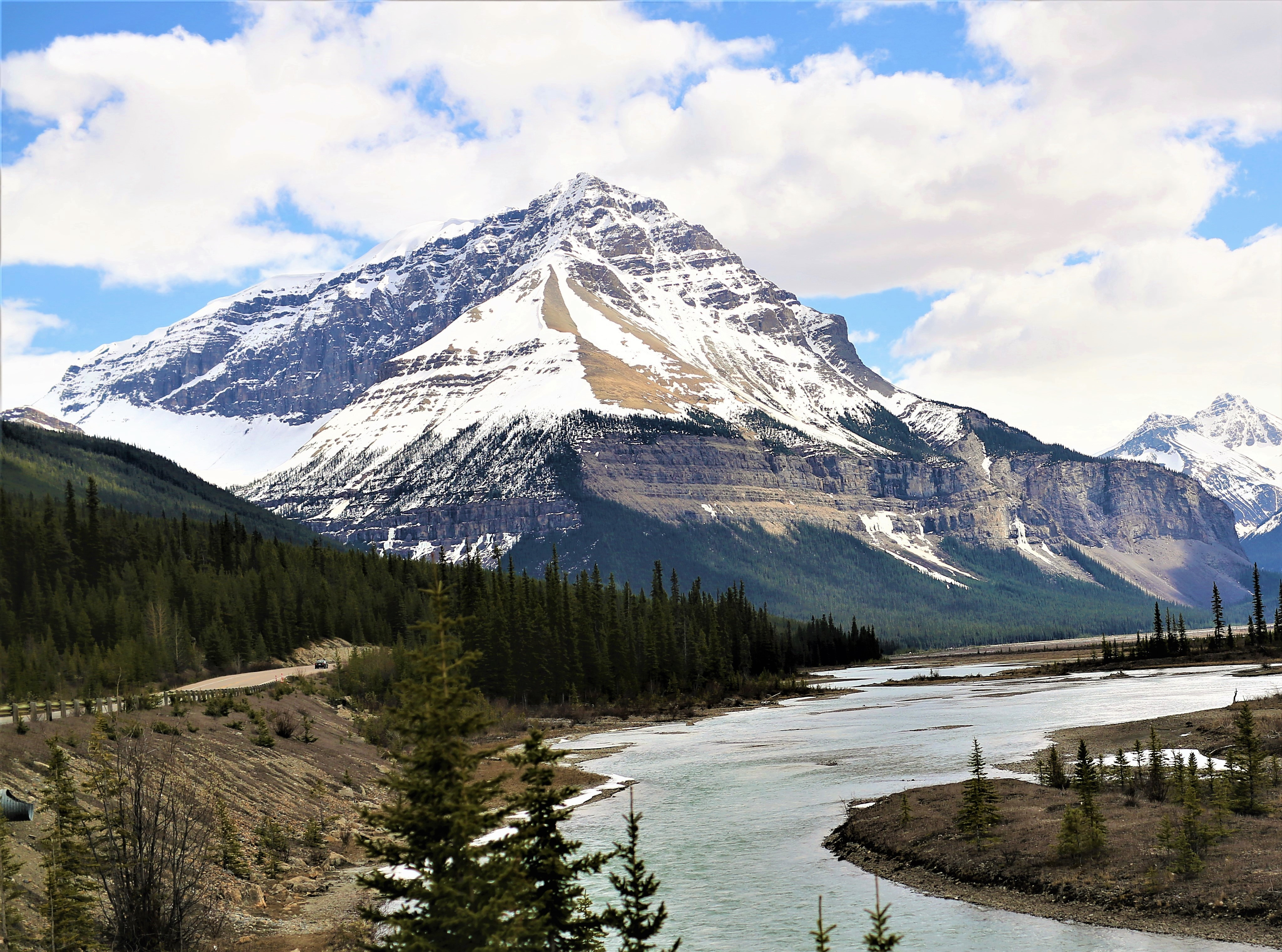
Tangle Ridge and Sunwapta River

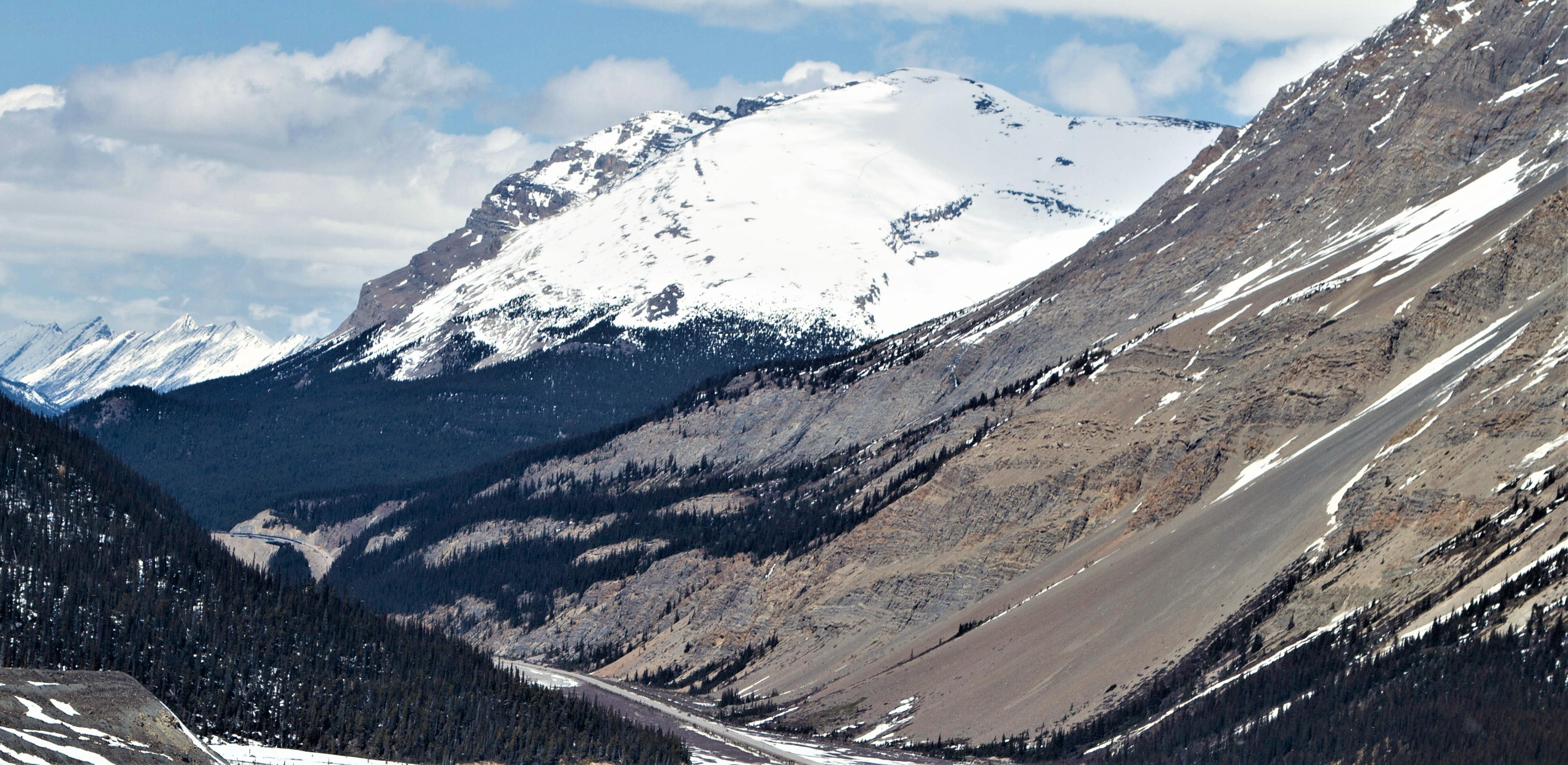
Tangle Ridge from the south

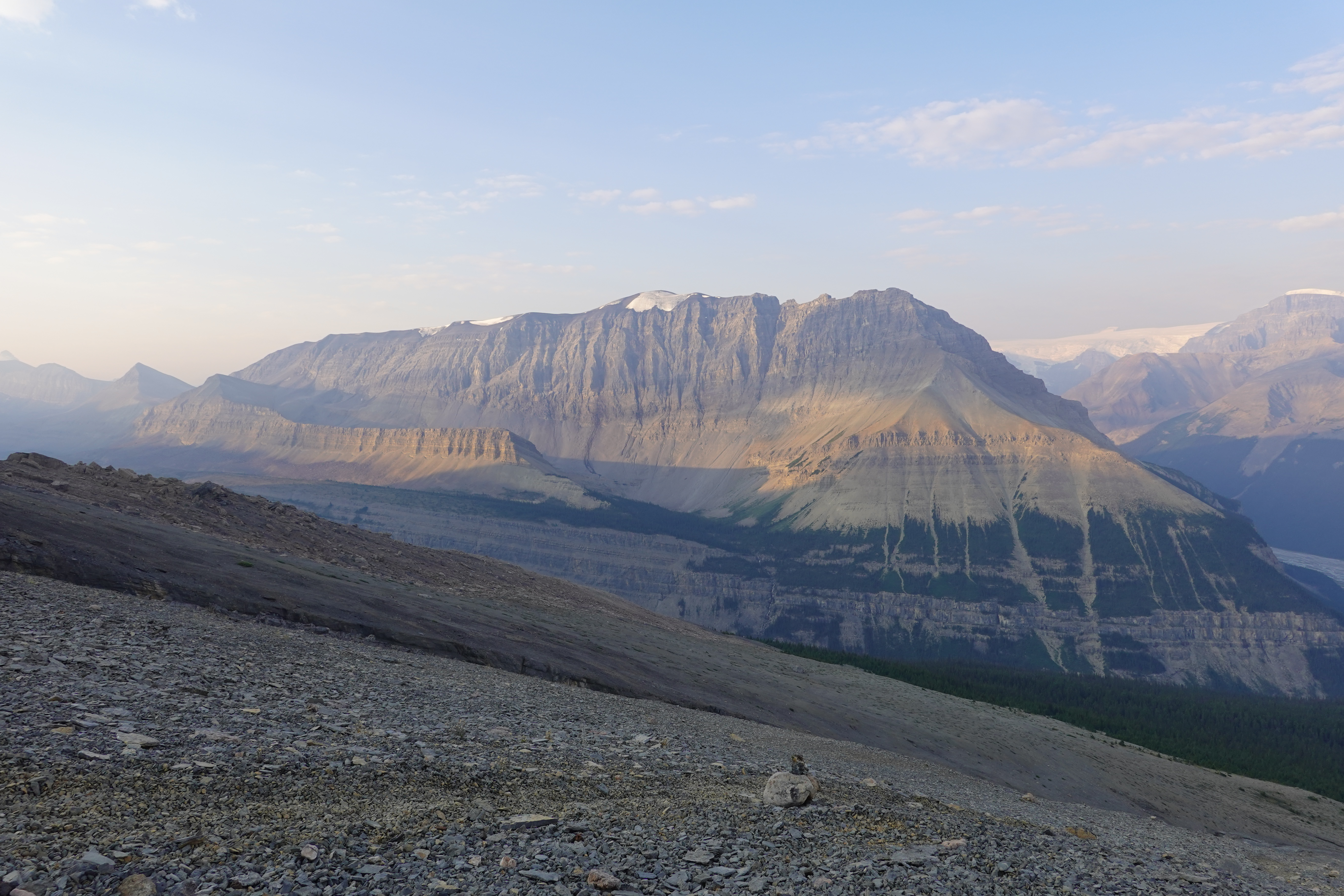
North aspect from Sunwapta Peak

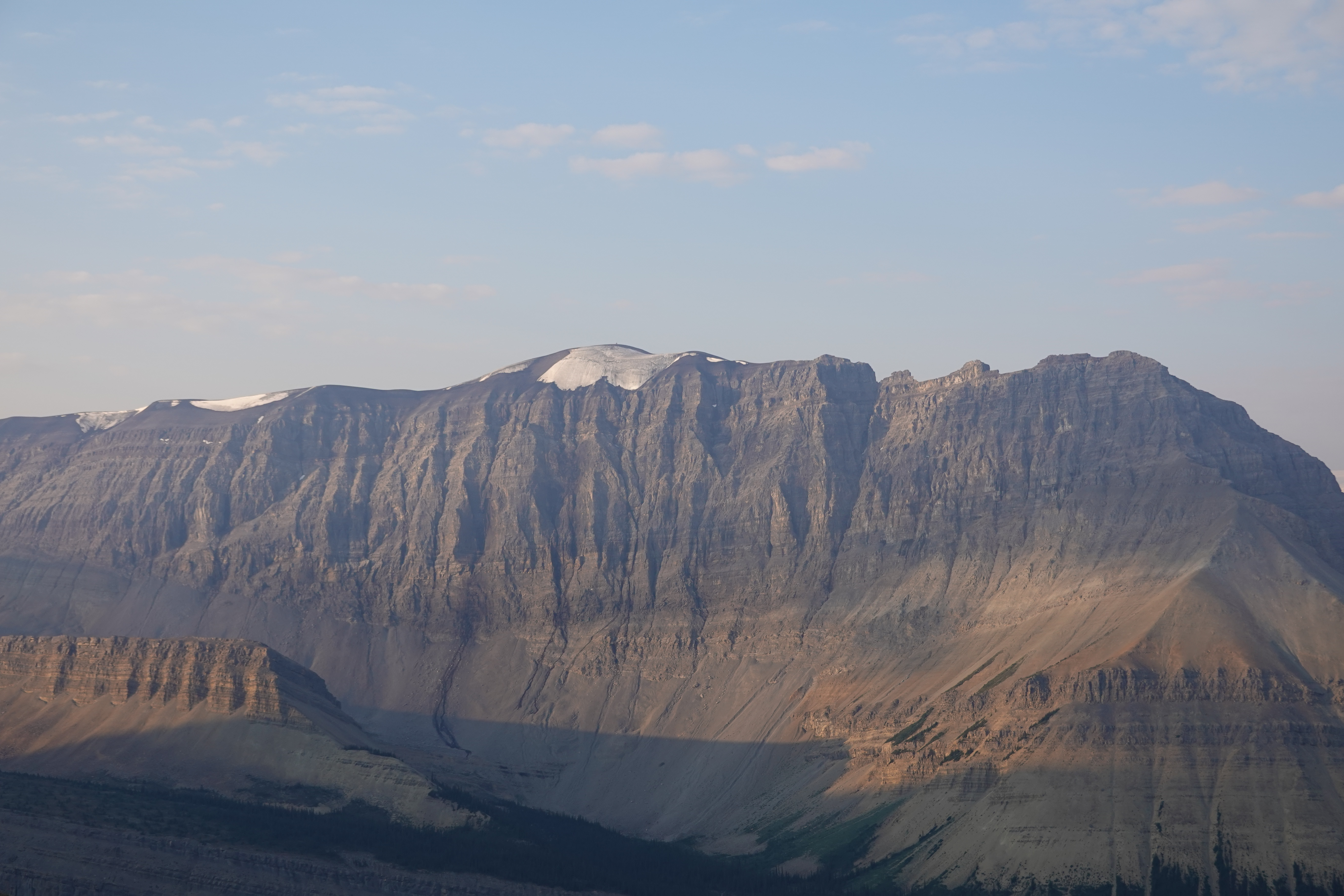
North face

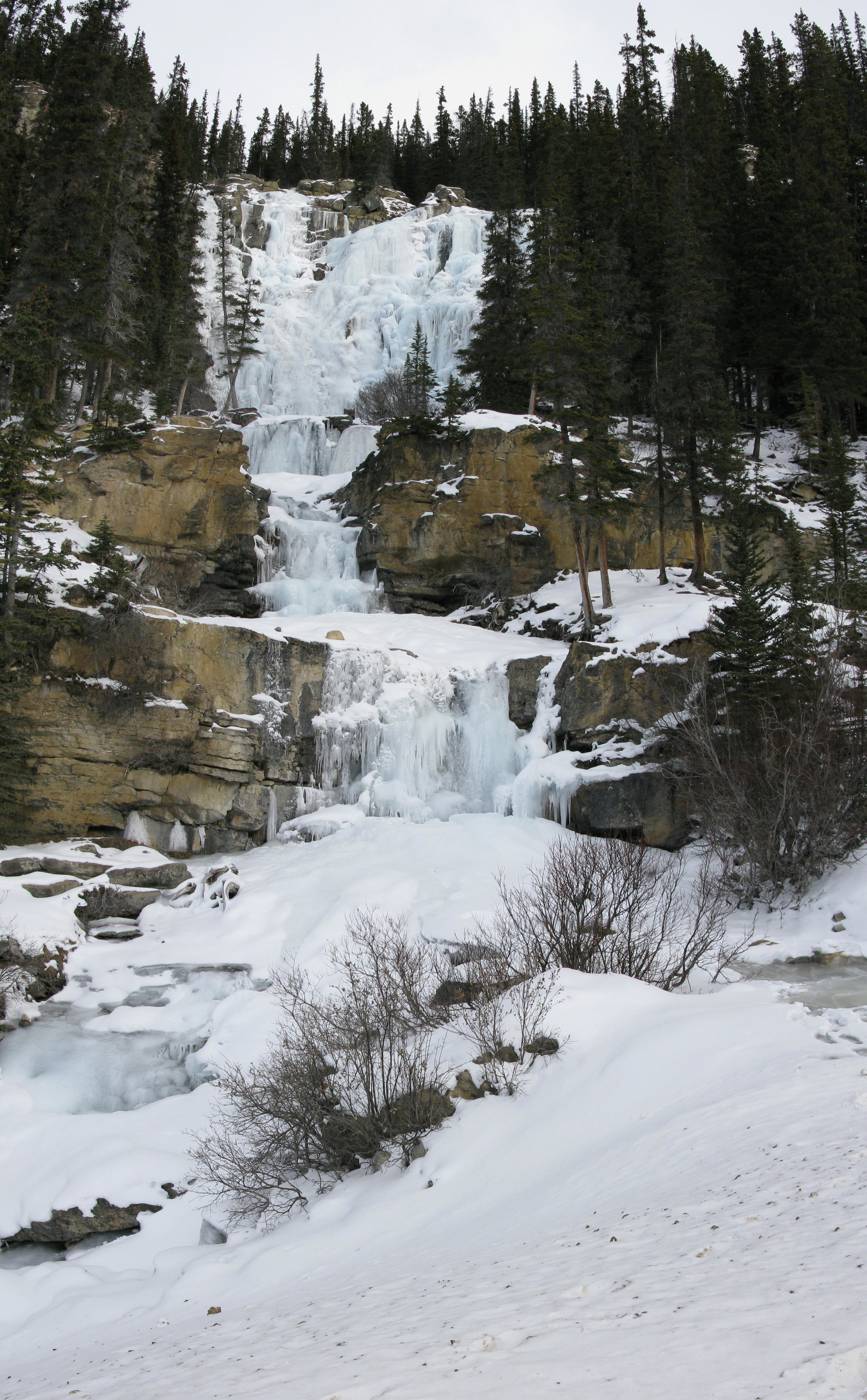
Tangle Falls in winter

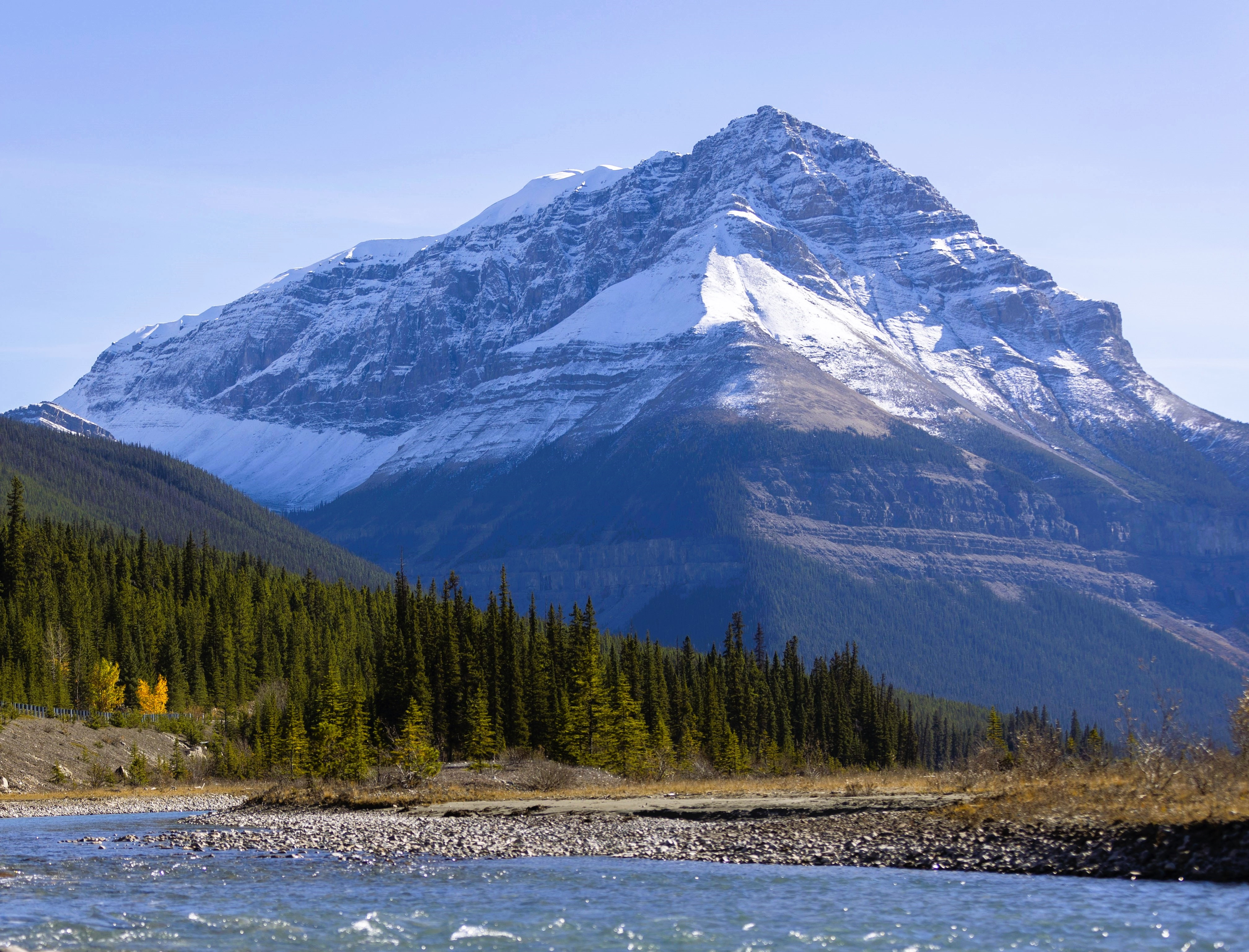
Tangle Ridge and Sunwapta River

== See also ==
- List of mountains of Canada
- Geography of Alberta
