= Mount McGuire (Alberta) =

Mountain in Alberta, Canada

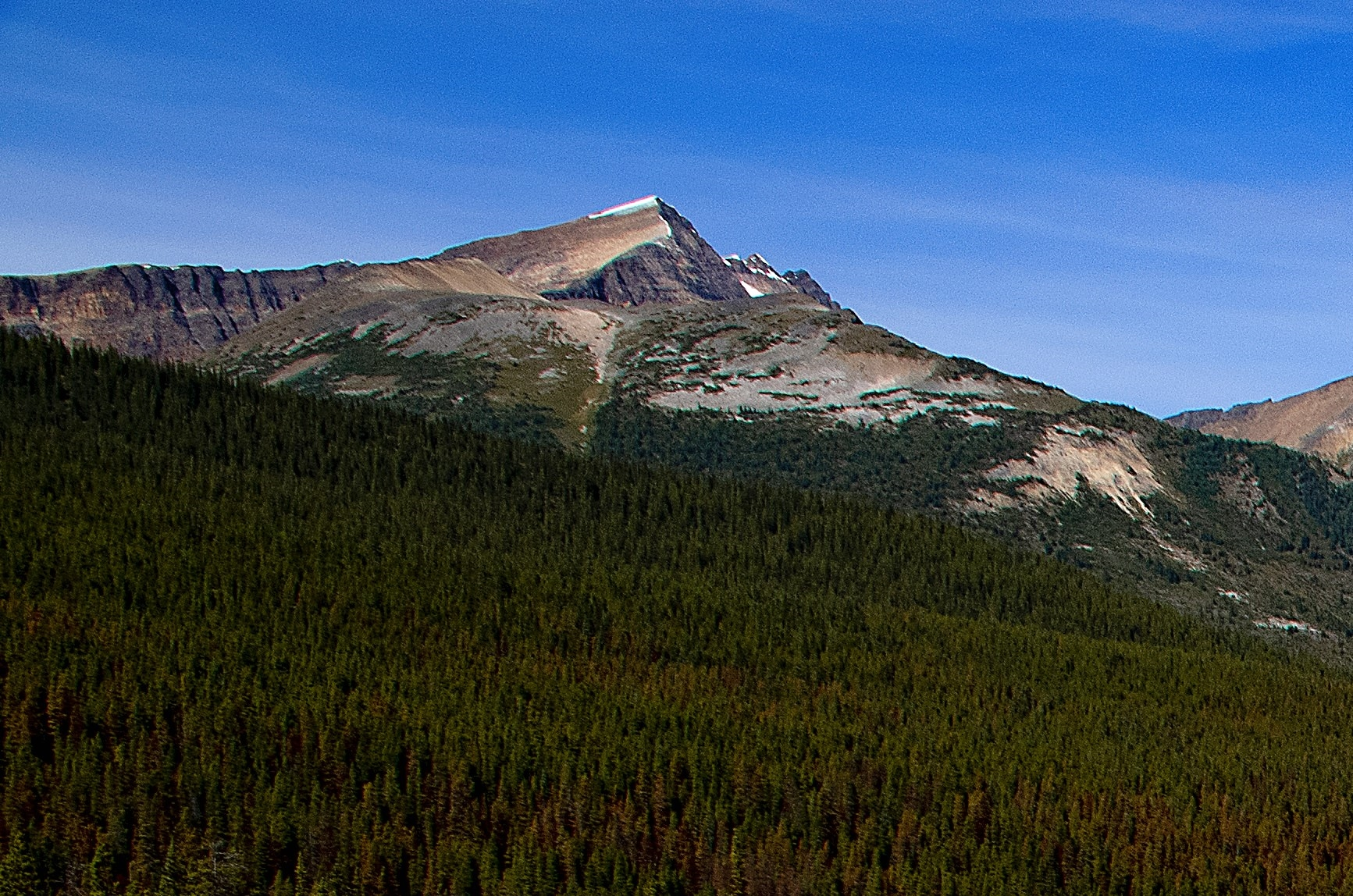
- Southeast aspect

Highest point
- Elevation: 3,030 m (9,940 ft)
- Prominence: 110 m (360 ft)
- Listing: Mountains of Alberta
- Coordinates: 52°22′30″N 117°27′00″W

Geography
- Location within Alberta
- Country: Canada
- Province: Alberta
- Parent range: Winston Churchill Range
- Topo map: NTS 83C6 Sunwapta Peak

Climbing
- First ascent: 1971 by H.L. Fuhrer, B. Martin
- Easiest route: rock/snow climb

Mount McGuire is a mountain located in the Sunwapta River Valley of Jasper National Park, in Alberta, Canada.

The mountain was named in 1971 after Fenton John Alexander "Mickey" McGuire, who served as a warden in the park for 34 years and ended his career as chief park warden.

== Geology ==
Mount McGuire is composed of sedimentary rock laid down during the Cambrian period and pushed east and over the top of younger rock during the Laramide orogeny.

== Climate ==
Based on the Köppen climate classification, Mount McGuire is located in a subarctic climate with cold, snowy winters, and mild summers. Winter temperatures can drop below -20 °C with wind chill factors below -30 °C.

== See also ==
- List of mountains in the Canadian Rockies
