= Little Alberta =

- Location within Alberta

Highest point
- Elevation: 2,956 m (9,698 ft)
- Prominence: 250 m (820 ft)
- Parent peak: Mount Woolley (3405 m)
- Listing: Mountains of Alberta
- Coordinates: 52°16′26″N 117°26′17″W

Geography
- Location: Alberta, Canada
- Parent range: Winston Churchill Range
- Topo map: NTS 83C6 Sunwapta Peak

Climbing
- First ascent: 1924 by Joseph W.A. Hickson, Howard Palmer and Conrad Kain
- Easiest route: rock/snow climb

Little Alberta is a mountain located east of Habel Creek in the Canadian Rockies of Jasper National Park. The mountain was named in 1984 after nearby Mount Alberta (3,619 m (11,873 ft)).

The Alpine Club of Canada (ACC) operates the Lloyd MacKay Hut on a rocky shoulder of Little Alberta.

== See also ==
- Royal eponyms in Canada
