= Gong Peak =

Mountain in Alberta, Canada

- Location within Alberta

Highest point
- Elevation: 3,120 m (10,240 ft)
- Prominence: 280 m (920 ft)
- Parent peak: Mount Smythe (3,246 m)
- Listing: Mountains of Alberta
- Coordinates: 52°22′11″N 117°27′33″W

Geography
- Country: Canada
- Province: Alberta
- Parent range: Winston Churchill Range
- Topo map: NTS 83C6 Sunwapta Peak

Climbing
- First ascent: 1936 by E. Cromwell, E. Cromwell Jr., F.S. North, J. Monroe Thorington
- Easiest route: rock/snow climb

Gong Peak is a mountain located in the Sunwapta River Valley of Jasper National Park in Alberta, Canada. The peak lies three km southeast of Mount Weiss. The mountain was named in 1919 by the Interprovincial Boundary Survey after nearby Gong Lake.
