= Mushroom Peak =

Mountain in Alberta, Canada

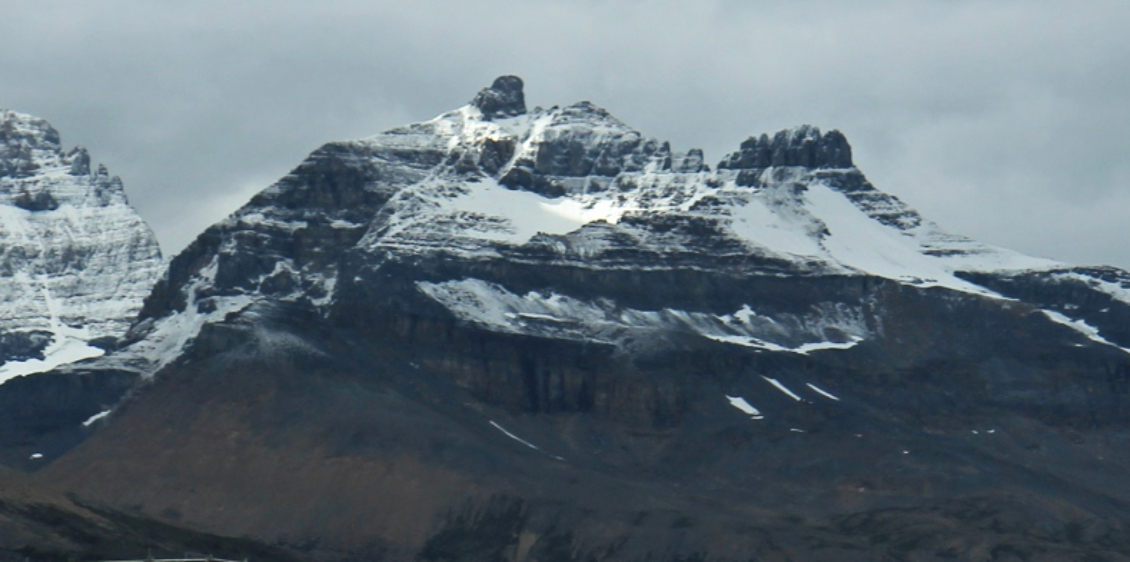
- Mushroom Peak, south aspect, seen from Icefields Parkway

Highest point
- Elevation: 3,210 m (10,530 ft)
- Prominence: 270 m (890 ft)
- Parent peak: Diadem Peak (3371 m)
- Listing: Mountains of Alberta
- Coordinates: 52°18′42″N 117°23′50″W

Geography
- Location within Alberta
- Interactive map of Mushroom Peak
- Location: Alberta, Canada
- Parent range: Winston Churchill Range
- Topo map: NTS 83C6 Sunwapta Peak

Climbing
- First ascent: 1947 by Noel E. Odell
- Easiest route: rock/snow climb

Mushroom Peak is a mountain located in the Sunwapta River valley of Alberta, Canada's Jasper National Park, lying just over a kilometre east of Diadem Peak. The mountain was named in 1947 by Noel E. Odell who made the first ascent (solo). Upon reaching the summit, he found that the dark limestone rocks there resembled mushrooms. The mountain can be seen from the Icefields Parkway.

== Climate ==
Based on the Köppen climate classification, Mushroom Peak is located in a subarctic climate with cold, snowy winters, and mild summers. Temperatures can drop below -20 °C with wind chill factors below -30 °C. Precipitation runoff from the mountain drains into the Sunwapta River which is a tributary of the Athabasca River.

== Geology ==
Mushroom Peak is composed of sedimentary rock laid down during the Precambrian to Jurassic periods. Formed in shallow seas, this sedimentary rock was pushed east and over the top of younger rock during the Laramide orogeny.

== Gallery ==
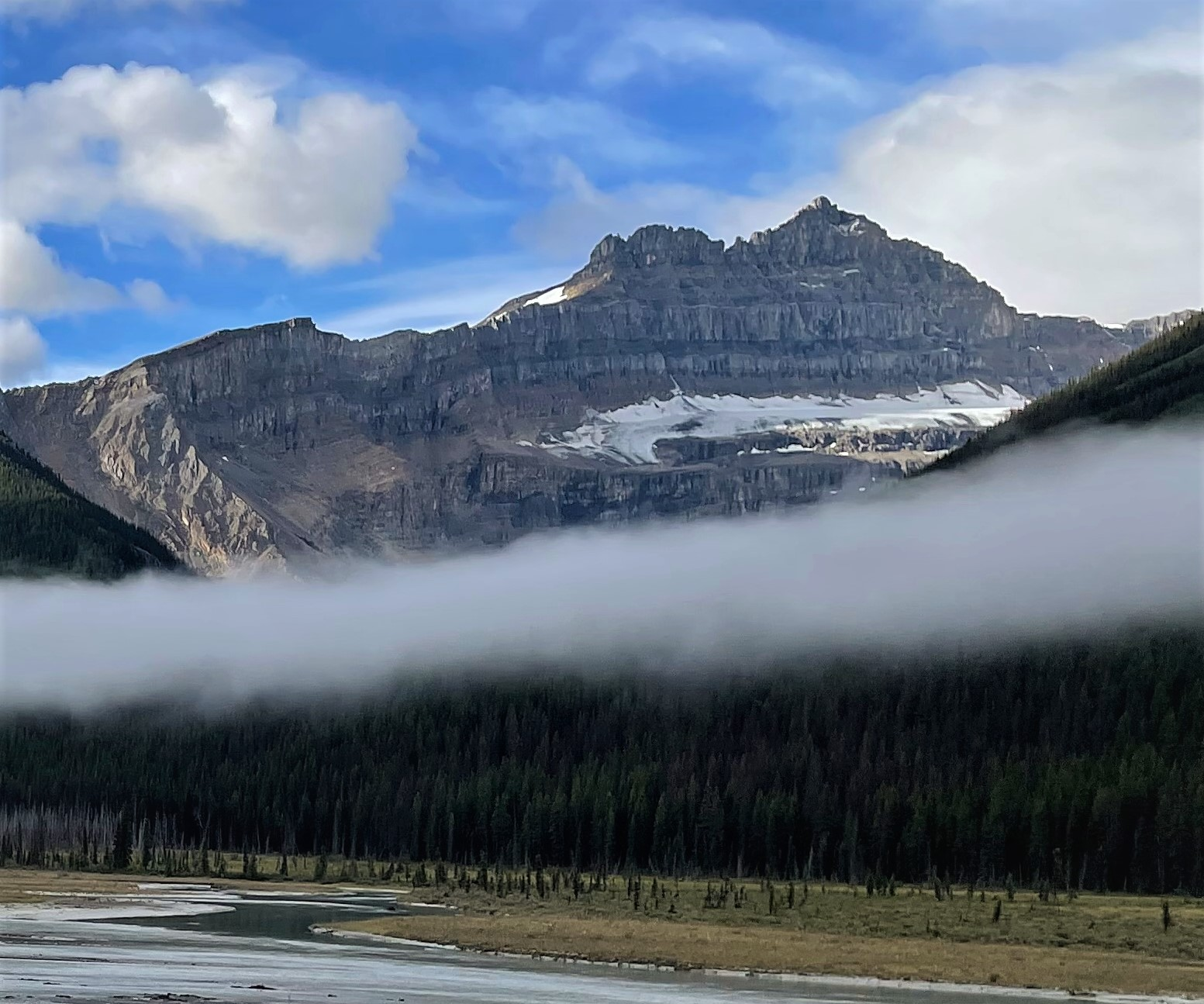
Mushroom Peak's north face

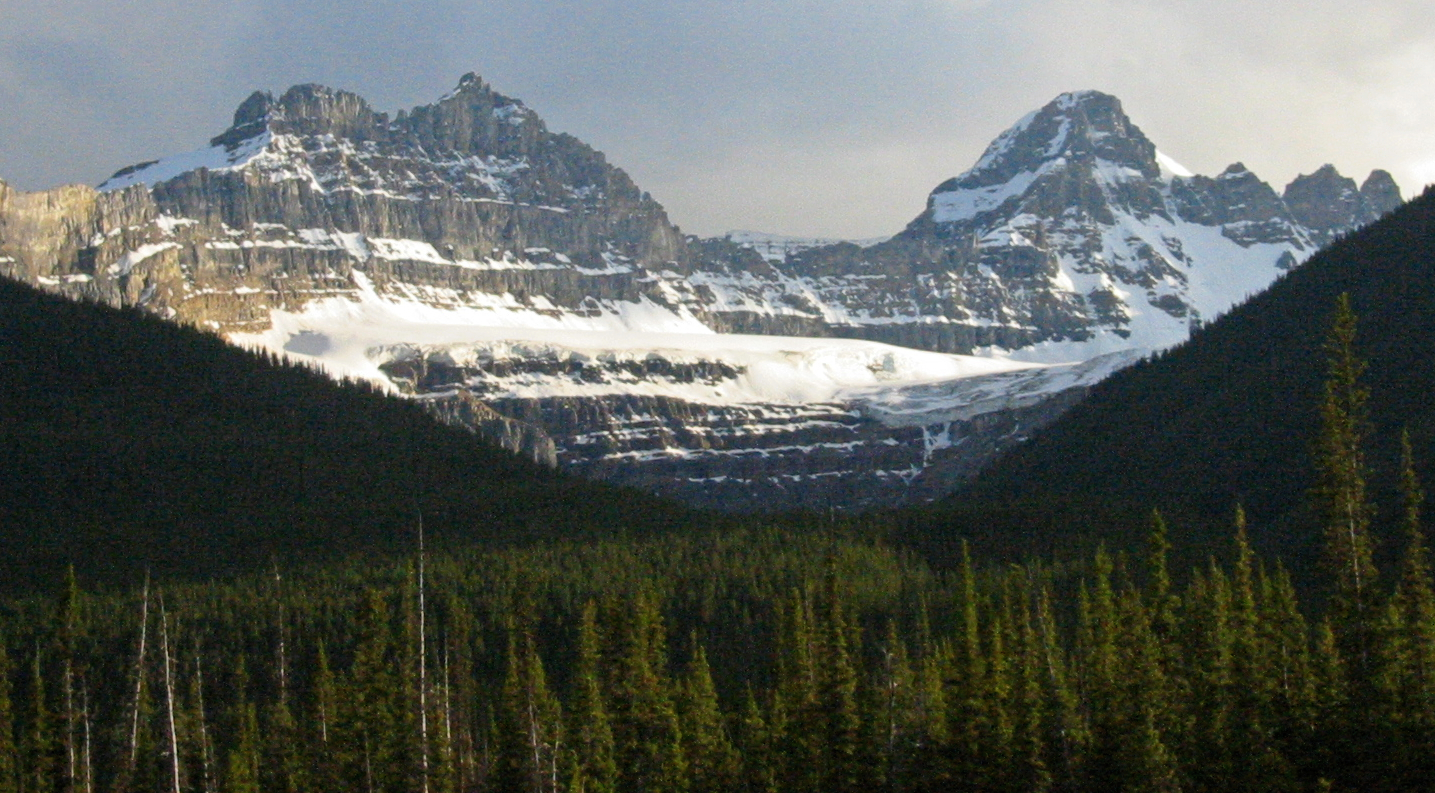
Mushroom Peak (left) seen with Diadem Peak (right) from the Icefields Parkway

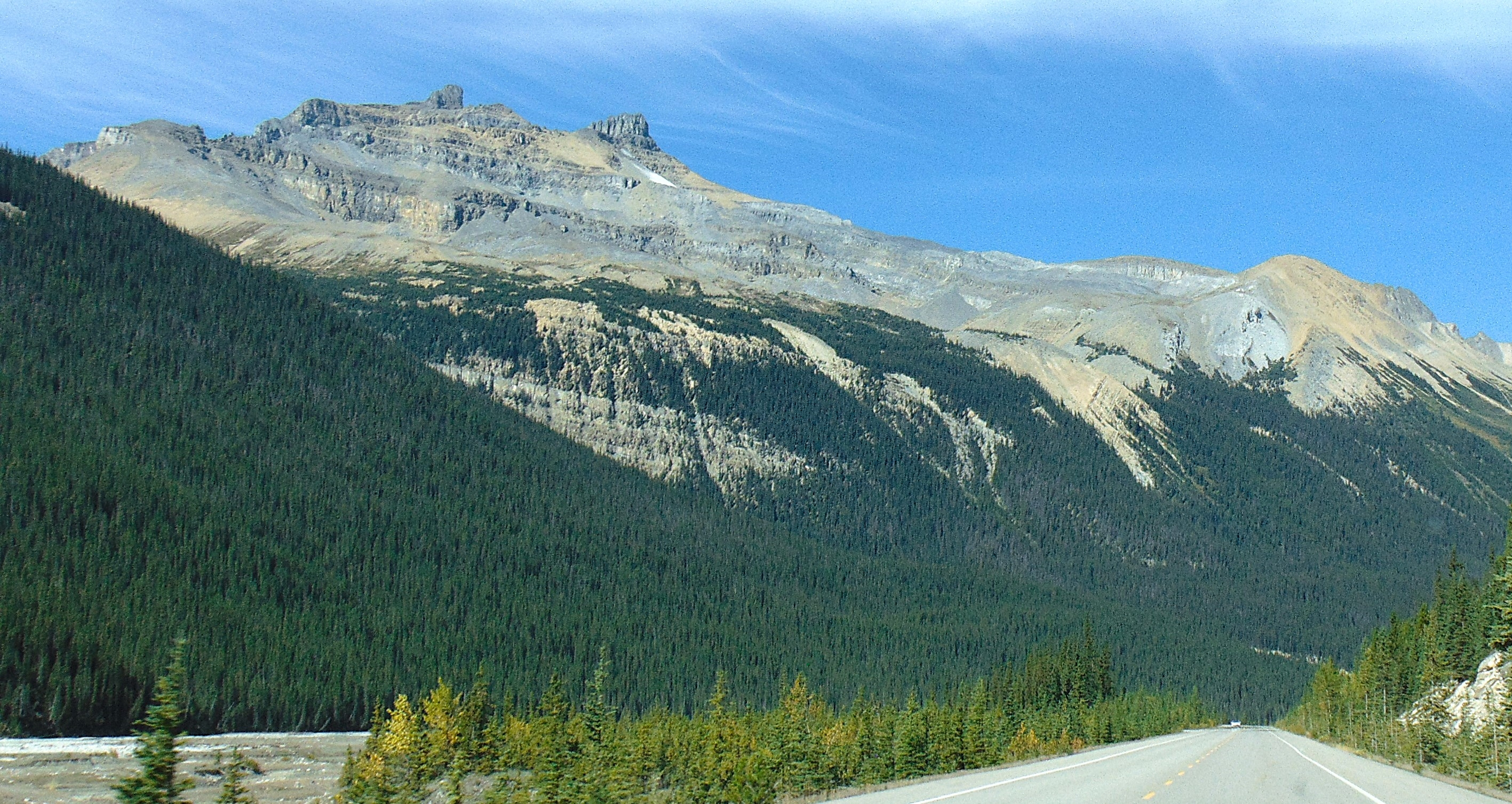
Southeast aspect from Icefields Parkway

== See also ==
- List of mountains in the Canadian Rockies
- Geography of Alberta
