= Mount Nelson (Alberta) =

Mountain in Alberta, Canada

- Location within Alberta

Highest point
- Elevation: 3,180 m (10,430 ft) (Note: Other sources state 3150 m.)
- Prominence: 240 m (790 ft)
- Parent peak: Mount Smythe (3246 m)
- Listing: Mountains of Alberta
- Coordinates: 52°20′46″N 117°28′10″W

Geography
- Country: Canada
- Province: Alberta
- Protected area: Jasper National Park
- Parent range: Winston Churchill Range
- Topo map: NTS 83C6 Sunwapta Peak

Climbing
- First ascent: 1951
- Easiest route: rock/snow climb

Mount Nelson is a mountain located near the west branch of Lynx Creek in Jasper National Park, Alberta, Canada. Diadem Peak lies 5 kilometres (3.1 mi) southeast of Mount Palmer

The mountain was named in 1952 by J. Monroe Thorington after an American climber with the last name of Nelson. Nelson had died in a climbing accident in The Bugaboos and the name was suggested by the first ascent party.

The first ascent was made in 1951 by Dale Ebersbacher, Frances Ebersbacher, Gil Roberts, Chuck Wilts, and Ellen Wilts.

== See also ==
- List of mountains in the Canadian Rockies
