= Lynx Creek (disambiguation) =

Lynx Creek, a creek in Arizona that feeds Lynx Lake

Lynx Creek may also refer to:

== Places ==
- Lynx Creek, British Columbia, a small rural community in Hudson's Hope, British Columbia, Canada

== Creeks ==
=== Canada ===
- Lynx Creek (Kakwa River), a tributary of the Kakwa River in western Alberta, Canada
- Lynx Creek (Ram River), a tributary of the Ram River in the Alberta Rocky Mountains, Canada
- Lynx Creek (north branch), a creek near Thorington Tower a mountain in Jasper National Park, Alberta, Canada
- Lynx Creek (west branch), a creek near Mount Nelson a mountain in Jasper National Park, Alberta, Canada
- Lynx Creek (Peace River), a tributary of the Peace River in northeastern British Columbia, Canada
- Lynx Creek (Ontario), a creek on which the community of Lynx, Ontario is located in northeastern Ontario, Canada

== United States ==
- Lynx Creek (Hall Creek), a tributary of Hall Creek and the Spokane River in Washington state, U.S.
- Three Lynx Creek, a tributary of the Clackamas River in Oregon
