= Thorington Tower =

- Location within Alberta

Highest point
- Elevation: 3,155 m (10,351 ft)
- Prominence: 275 m (902 ft)
- Parent peak: Mount Smythe (3246 m)
- Listing: Mountains of Alberta
- Coordinates: 52°21′27″N 117°30′10″W

Geography
- Country: Canada
- Province: Alberta
- Protected area: Jasper National Park
- Parent range: Winston Churchill Range
- Topo map: NTS 83C5 Fortress Lake

Climbing
- First ascent: 1967 by Don Lashier and Charlie Raymond
- Easiest route: Rock/snow climb

Thorington Tower is a mountain in Alberta, Canada. It is located near the north branch of Lynx Creek in Jasper National Park.

Mount Palmer lies 1½ km west of the tower. The mountain was named in 1967 after J. Monroe Thorington, an American ophthalmologist who climbed extensively in the Selkirks and the Canadian Rockies during the 1920s and 1930s. First ascent was by Don Lashier and Charlie Raymond in September 1967.

== See also ==
- List of mountains in the Canadian Rockies
- Geography of Alberta
