= Mount Smythe (Alberta) =

Mountain in Jasper NP, Alberta, Canada

- Location within Alberta Location within Canada

Highest point
- Elevation: 3,246 m (10,650 ft)
- Prominence: 420 m (1,380 ft)
- Parent peak: Diadem Peak (3371 m)
- Listing: Mountains of Alberta
- Coordinates: 52°21′22″N 117°28′51″W

Geography
- Country: Canada
- Province: Alberta
- Protected area: Jasper National Park
- Parent range: Winston Churchill Range
- Topo map: NTS 83C6 Sunwapta Peak

Climbing
- First ascent: 1951 by Gil Roberts, Chuck Wilts, Ellen Wilts
- Easiest route: Rock/snow climb

Mount Smythe is a mountain in Jasper National Park, Alberta, Canada.

It is located in the Winston Churchill Range, 2 km (1.2 mi) southwest of Gong Peak and 1 km (0.62 mi) north of Mount Nelson. It reaches a summit elevation of 3,246 m (10,650 ft).

The mountain was named after Francis Sydney Smythe, an international mountaineer who climbed in the Himalayas, Alps and the Canadian Rockies.

== Geology ==
Mount Smythe is composed of sedimentary rock laid down during the Precambrian to Jurassic periods. Formed in shallow seas, this sedimentary rock was pushed east and over the top of younger rock during the Laramide orogeny.

== Climate ==
Based on the Köppen climate classification, Mount Smythe is located in a subarctic climate with cold, snowy winters, and mild summers. Temperatures can drop below −20 °C with wind chill factors below −30 °C.

== See also ==
- List of mountains in the Canadian Rockies
