= Mount Confederation =

Mountain in Alberta, Canada

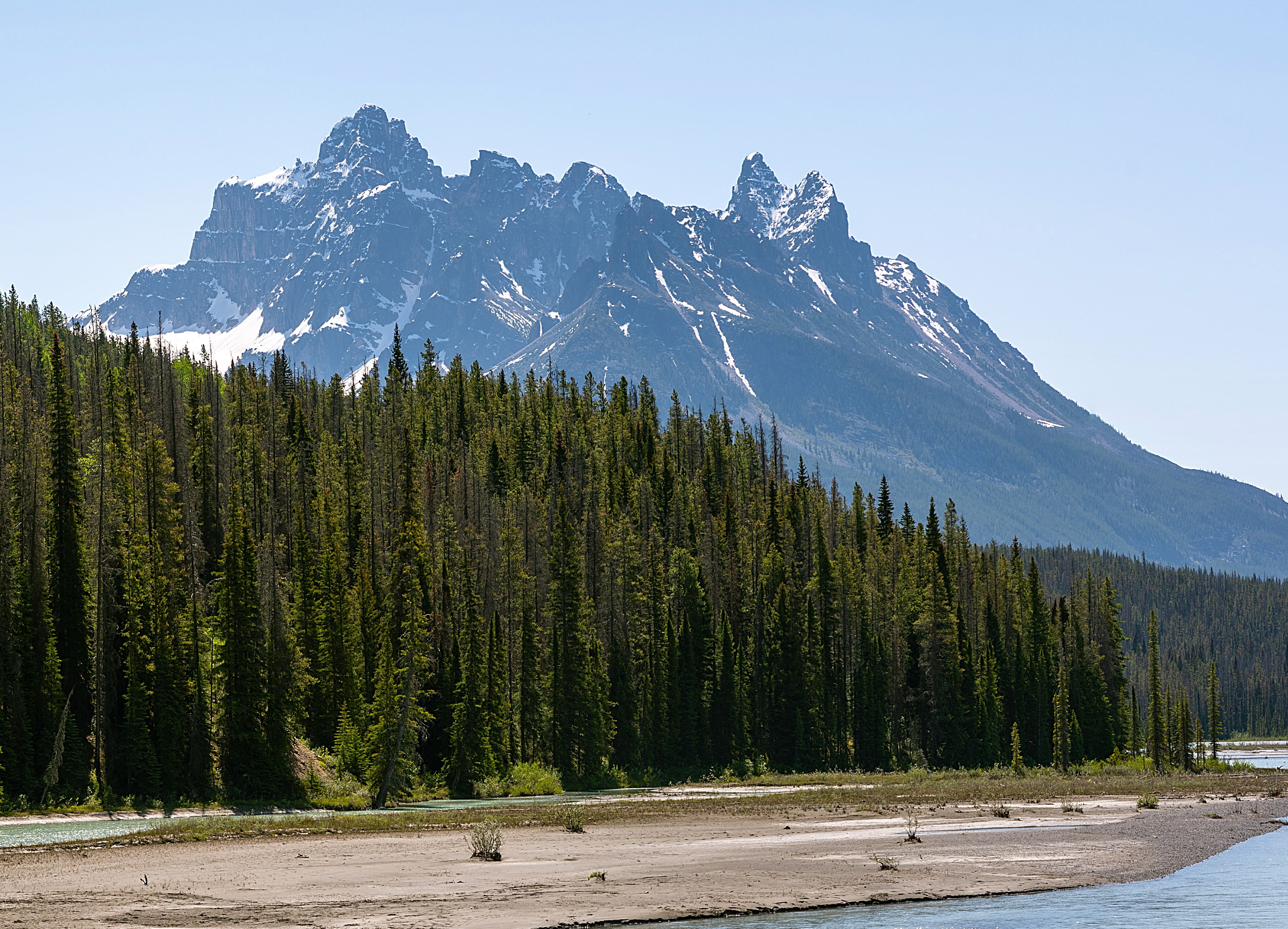
- North aspect

Highest point
- Elevation: 2,969 m (9,741 ft)
- Prominence: 429 m (1,407 ft)
- Listing: Mountains of Alberta
- Coordinates: 52°24′13″N 117°34′35″W

Geography
- Location within Alberta
- Location: Alberta, Canada
- Parent range: Winston Churchill Range
- Topo map: NTS 83C5 Fortress Lake

Climbing
- First ascent: 1947 by John Mendenhall and his wife
- Easiest route: rock/snow climb

Mount Confederation is a mountain located north of Gong Lake in the Athabasca River Valley of Jasper National Park, Canada. The mountain was named in 1927 by Alfred J. Ostheimer after the Fathers of Confederation.
