= Mount Morden Long =

Mountain in Alberta, Canada

- Location within Alberta

Highest point
- Elevation: 3,040 m (9,970 ft)
- Prominence: 360 m (1,180 ft)
- Parent peak: Mount Adam Joachim (3094 m)
- Listing: Mountains of Alberta
- Coordinates: 52°25′21″N 117°32′16″W

Geography
- Location: Alberta, Canada
- Parent range: Winston Churchill Range
- Topo map: NTS 83C5 Fortress Lake

Mount Morden Long is a mountain located in the Athabasca River Valley of Jasper National Park in Alberta, Canada.

The mountain was named in 1966 after Mordon Long, who was a respected Canadian historian and chairman of the Geographic Board of Alberta.
