= Habel Creek =

Stream in the country of Canada

Coordinates: 52.25003°N 117.50231°W

Habel Creek is a stream in Alberta, Canada.

Habel Creek has the name of Jean Habel, a pioneer citizen.

== See also ==
- List of rivers of Alberta
