= Mount Columbia (Canada) =

Highest mountain in Alberta, Canada

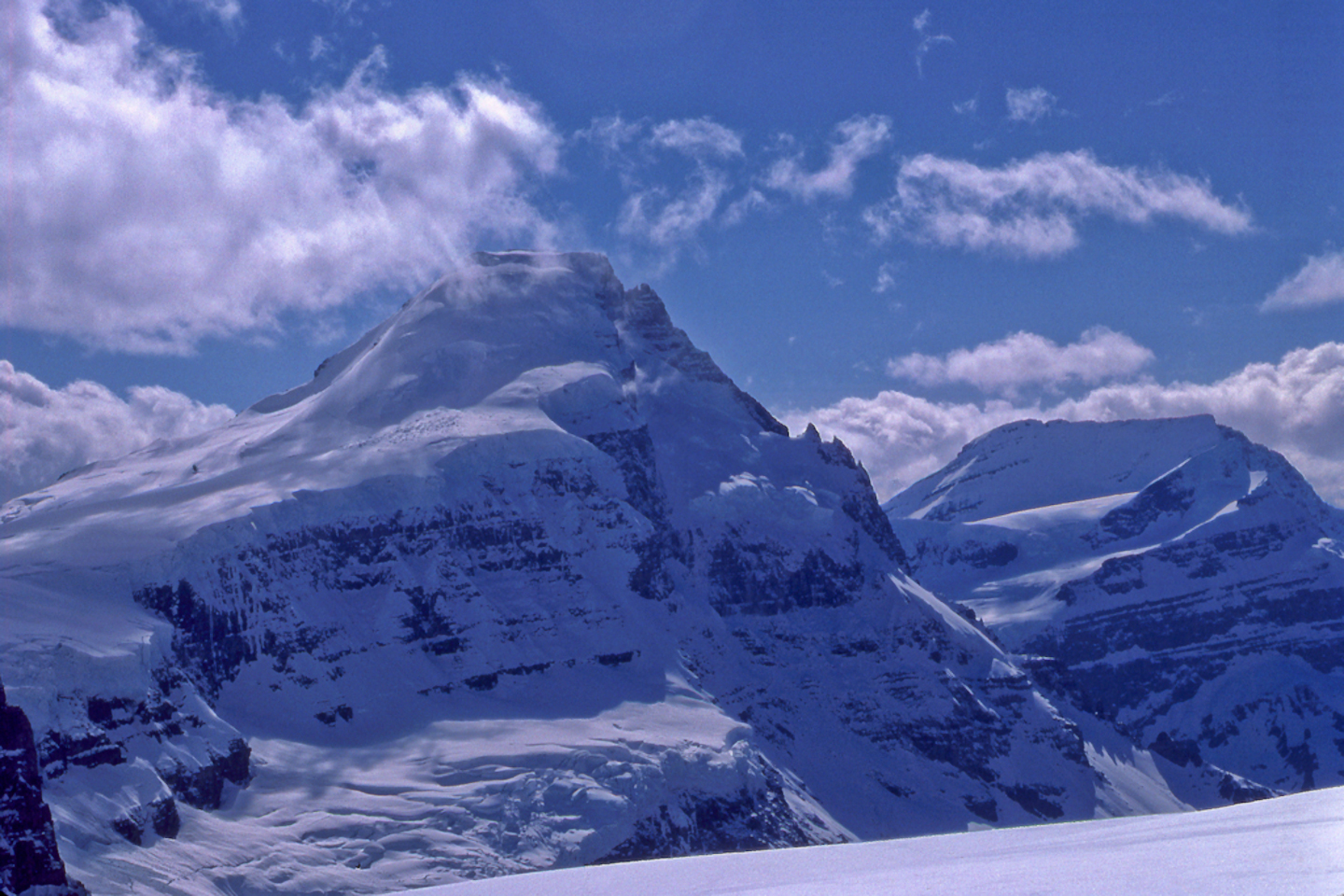
- Mount Columbia & King Edward in background

Highest point
- Elevation: 3,747 m (12,293 ft)
- Prominence: 2,383 m (7,818 ft)
- Isolation: 157.6 km (97.9 mi)
- Listing: North America prominent peaks 46th; Canada highest major peaks 28th; Canada most prominent peaks 17th; Canada most isolated peaks 36th; Canadian Subnational High Points 3rd
- Coordinates: 52°08′50″N 117°26′30″W

Geography
- Location within Alberta Location within British Columbia Location within Canada
- Country: Canada
- Provinces: Alberta; British Columbia
- Protected area: Jasper National Park
- Parent range: Winston Churchill Range (Canadian Rockies)
- Topo map: NTS 83C3 Columbia Icefield

Climbing
- First ascent: 1902 by James Outram, guided by Christian Kaufmann First winter ascent 1944 by Douglas Groff
- Easiest route: Glacier climb

Mount Columbia is a mountain located in the Winston Churchill Range of the Rocky Mountains. It is the highest point in Alberta, Canada, and is second only to Mount Robson for height and topographical prominence in the Canadian Rockies. It is located on the border between Alberta and British Columbia on the northern edge of the Columbia Icefield. Its highest point, however, lies within Jasper National Park in Alberta.

The mountain was named in 1898 by J. Norman Collie after the Columbia River. The river itself was named after the American ship Columbia Rediviva captained by Robert Gray, who first ventured over a dangerous sandbar and explored the lower reaches of the river in 1792. Mount Columbia was first ascended in 1902 by James Outram, guided by Christian Kaufmann. The first winter ascent of Columbia was completed on March 14, 1944, by about thirty men led by Major Douglas Groff of Winnipeg, during the course of a three-day patrol on the Icefield, using snow holes as sleeping quarters.

== Climbing routes ==
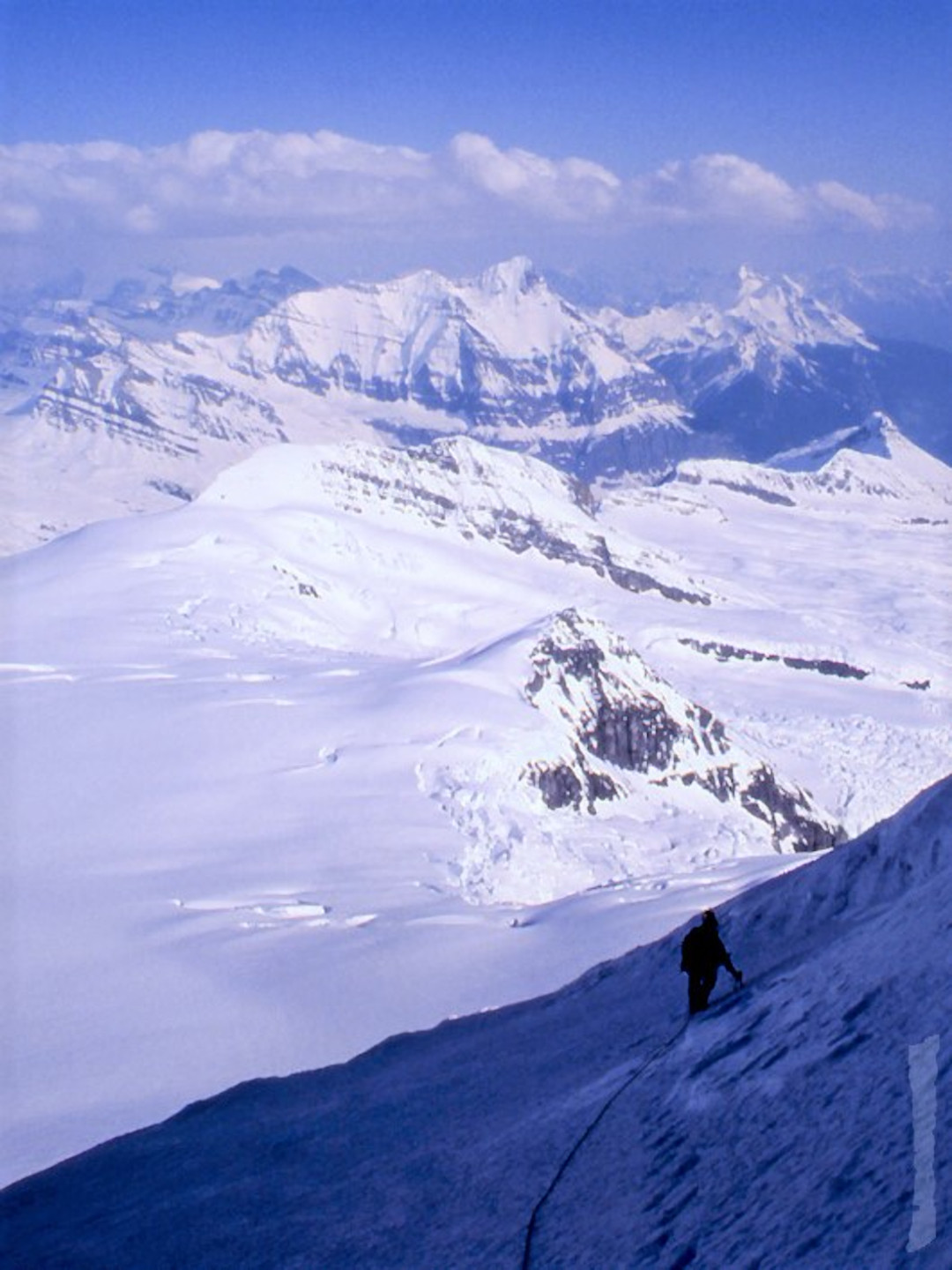
East Face

The normal route is on the east face, a non-technical glacier climb that is straightforward in summer, albeit with a long approach (approx. 19 km (12 mi)) up the Athabasca Glacier and over the Columbia Icefield. Camping by King's Trench can reduce the approach down to 8 km (5.0 mi). Other routes include the North Ridge, which is more technical (Grade V, YDS 5.7, W3) but considered more spectacular.

== Geology ==
Mount Columbia is composed of sedimentary rock laid down from the Precambrian to Jurassic periods. Formed in shallow seas, this sedimentary rock was pushed east and over the top of younger rock during the Laramide orogeny.

== Climate ==
Based on the Köppen climate classification, Mount Columbia is located in a subarctic climate with cold, snowy winters, and mild summers. Temperatures can drop below -20 °C with wind chill factors below -30 °C.

== Gallery ==
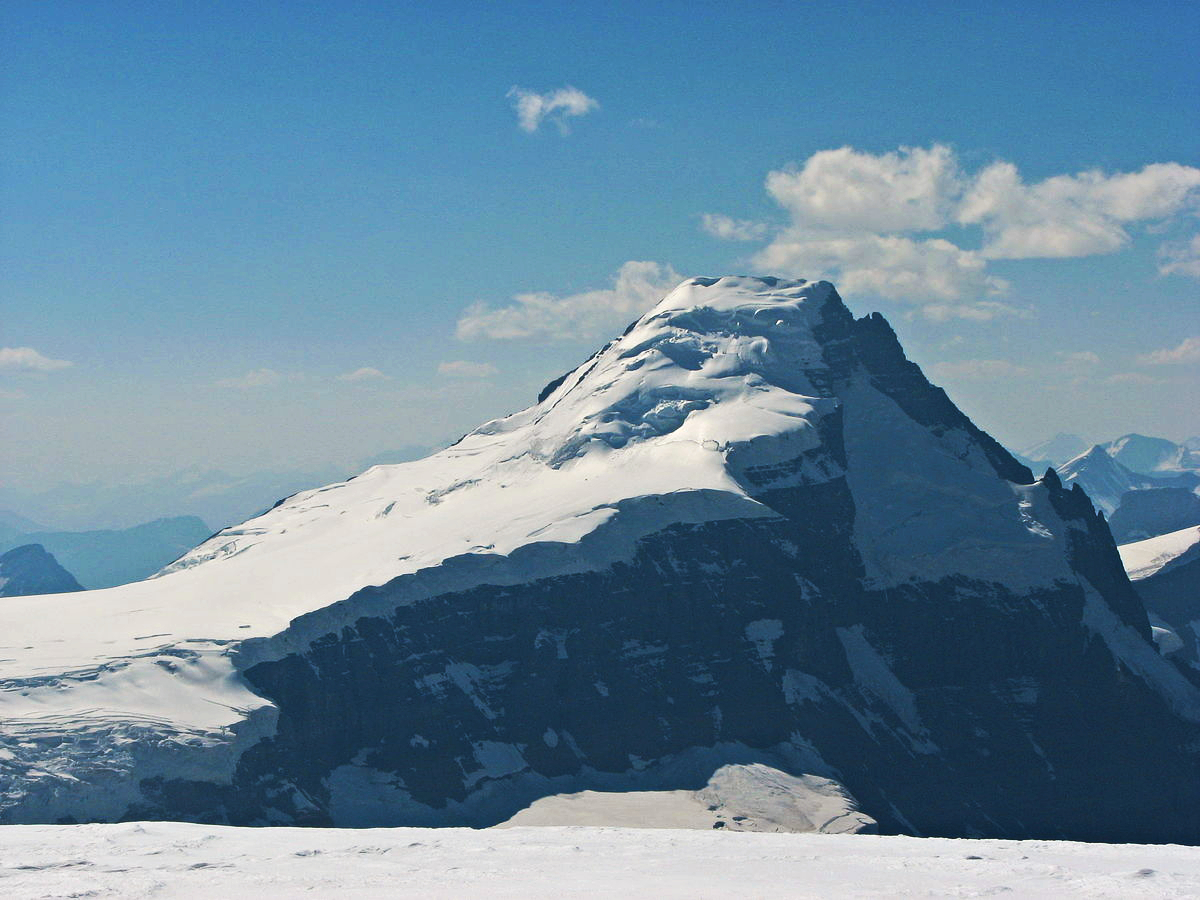
Mount Columbia, from the summit of Snow Dome

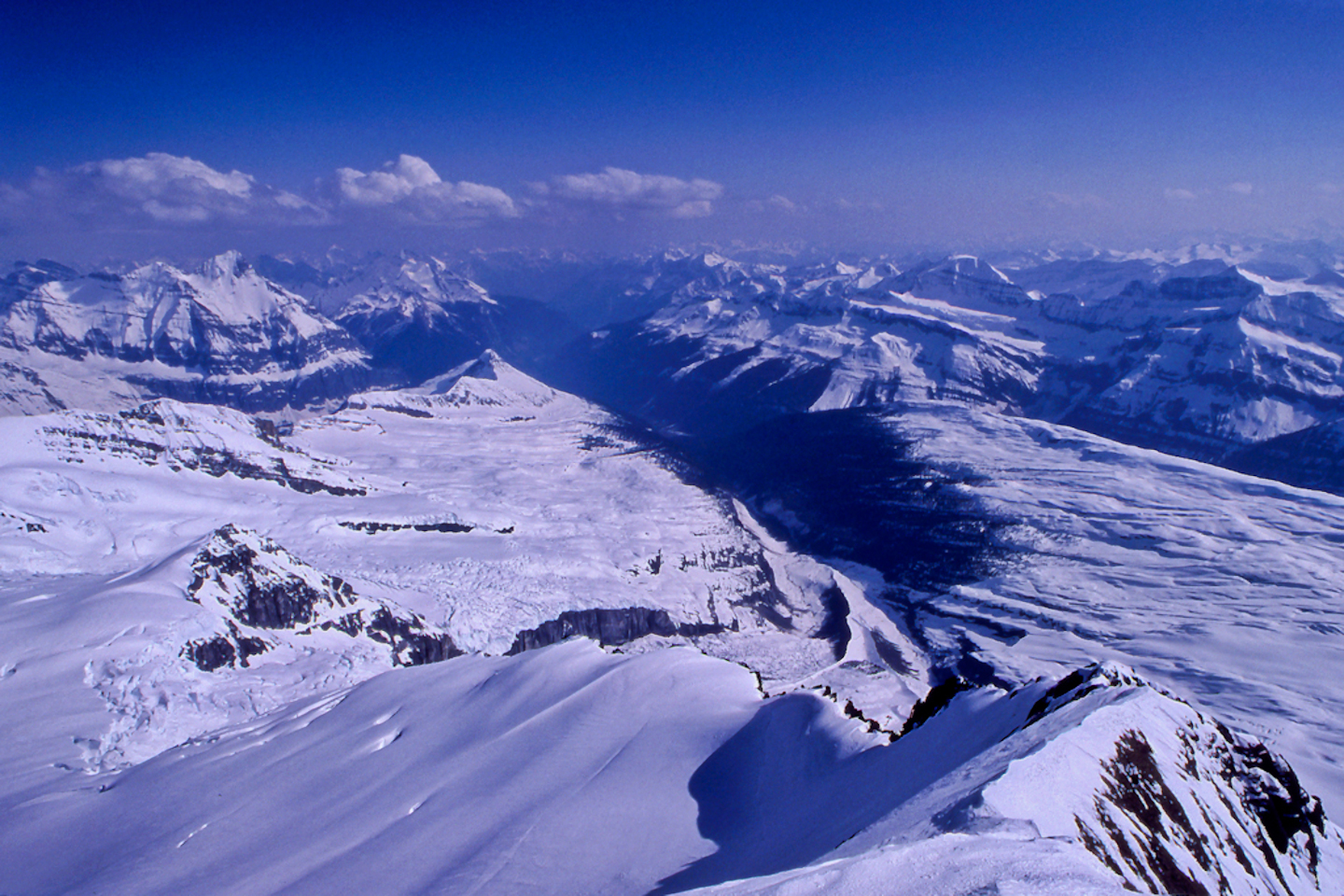
From Mt. Columbia summit looking SW

== See also ==
- List of mountains of Alberta
- List of mountains of British Columbia
- List of mountains in the Canadian Rockies
- List of highest points of Canadian provinces and territories
- Mountain peaks of North America
- Mountain peaks of the Rocky Mountains
