= Diadem Peak =

Mountain peak in Alberta, Canada

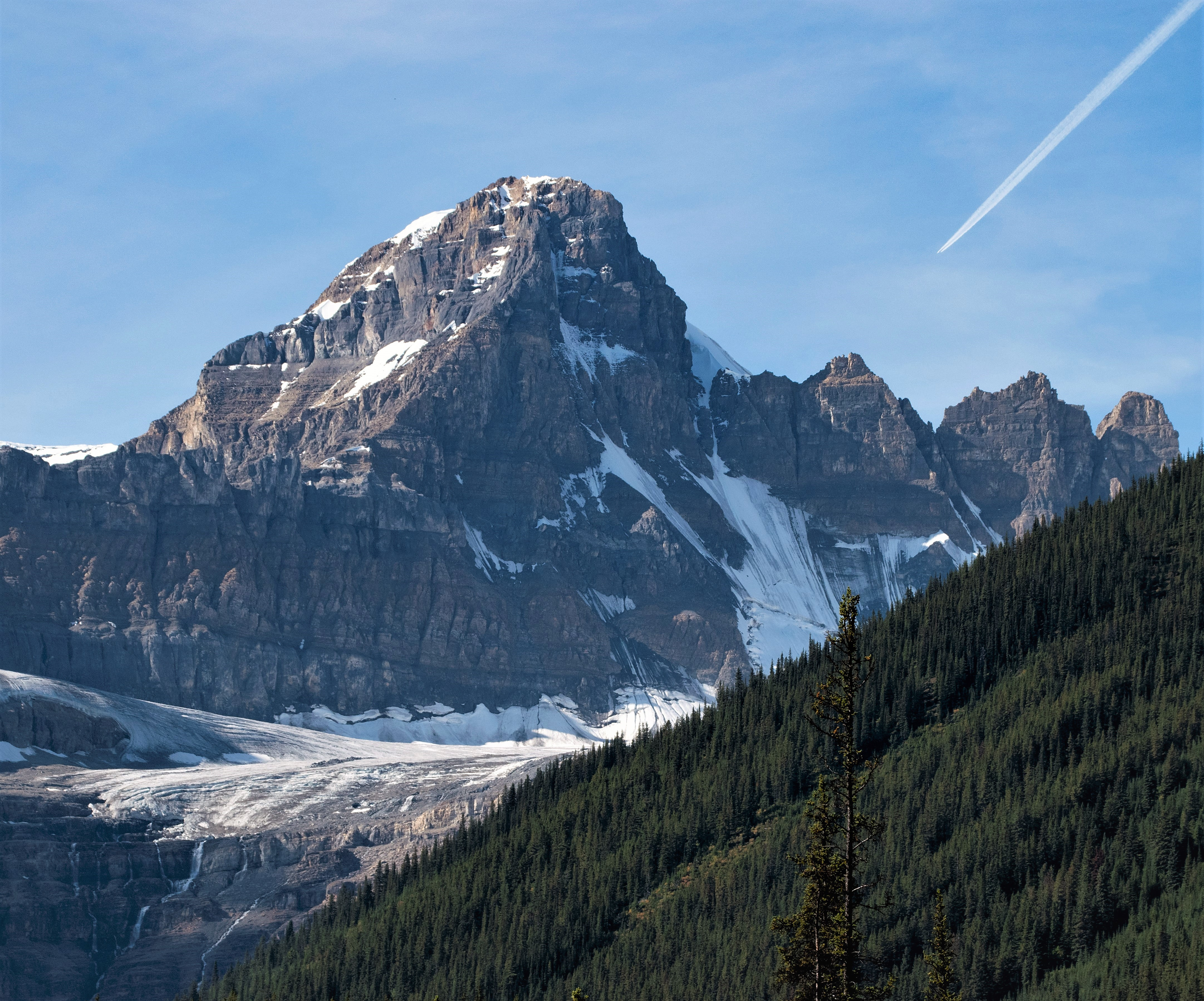
- Diadem Peak from Icefields Parkway

Highest point
- Elevation: 3,371 m (11,060 ft)
- Prominence: 211 m (692 ft)
- Parent peak: Mount Woolley (3405 m)
- Listing: Mountains of Alberta
- Coordinates: 52°18′38″N 117°25′15″W

Geography
- Location within Alberta
- Interactive map of Diadem Peak
- Country: Canada
- Province: Alberta
- Protected area: Jasper National Park
- Parent range: Winston Churchill Range
- Topo map: NTS 83C6 Sunwapta Peak

Climbing
- First ascent: 1898 by Collie, Stutfield and Woolley
- Easiest route: rock/snow/glacier climb (South Ridge)

Diadem Peak is a peak located in the Sunwapta River Valley of Jasper National Park, Canada. Diadem Peak is essentially the high point of a ridge leading down from the slightly higher Mount Woolley (3,405 m (11,171 ft)). This peak was the first 11,000er north of the Columbia Icefield to be climbed and one of the few peaks in the Canadian Rockies to be climbed before 1900.

The mountain was named in 1898 by the first ascent team of J. Norman Collie, Hugh Stutfield and Hermann Woolley. Upon reaching the summit, they discovered a crown (diadem) of snow about 30 m (98 ft) high covering the almost flat layer of rocks on top.

== Climbing history ==
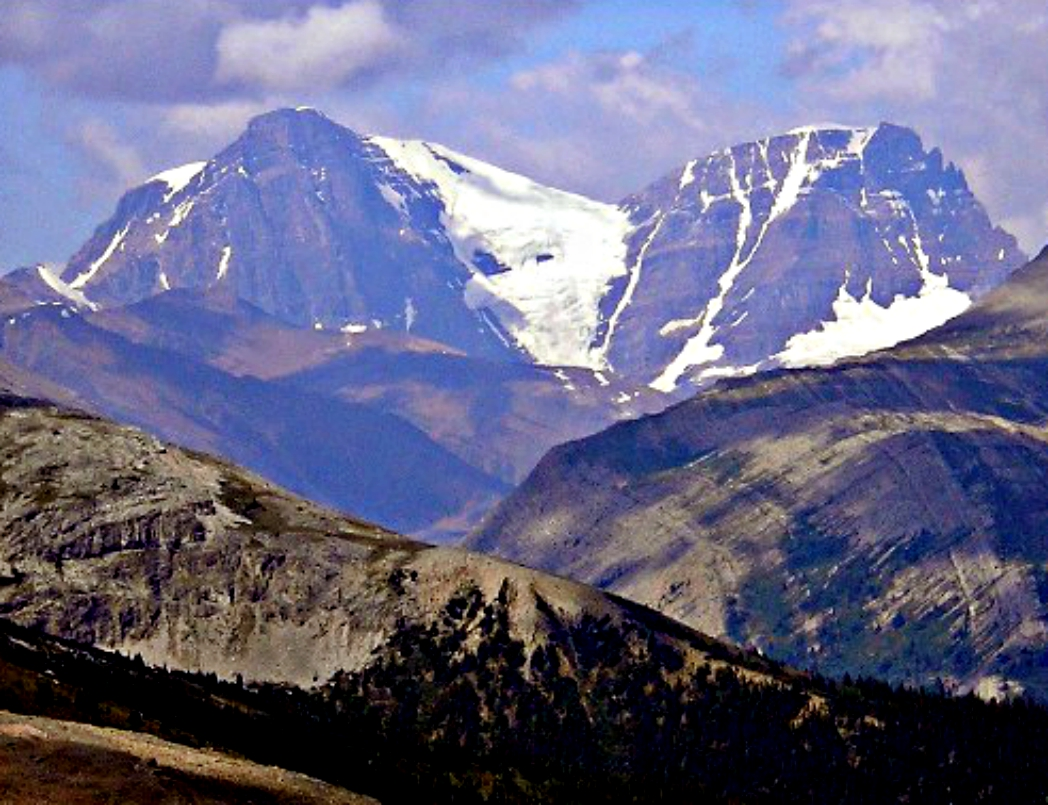
Diadem Peak (right) and Mount Woolley (left), from Parker Ridge

In the summer of 1898, J. Norman Collie, Hugh Stutfield and Herman Woolley, had made their way up Woolley Creek and initially had their sights on reaching the top of Mount Woolley by climbing the icefield that separates Mt. Woolley from Diadem Peak. However, after a brief downpour which forced them to seek shelter among some rocks, they had just begun preparing the rope for ascending the icefield when a large collapse of ice from the summit made them switch their objective to Diadem Peak. The party ascended the southeast ridge along loose shale and ice, eventually finding a small rock rib that took them to the summit on August 25. Collie recorded an initial elevation of 11,500 feet (3,505 m) using a mercurial barometer. With the use of crampons, the difficulties of the southeast ridge route are reduced by following a shallow snow gully up much of the way.

In 1962, William Buckingham and Bill Hooker, ascended Diadem Peak by what is now known as the South Ridge route. This route initially traverses loose rock ledges to reach a snow/ice couloir which is followed until the glacier levels off and is no longer fractured. Traversing left across rock to the glacier, the route follows the glacier up to the Woolley-Diadem col where Diadem's summit is reached after an easy ascent up the ridge. Jim Elzinga and Jeff Marshall made the first ascent up a mixed route on the North face of Diadem in July 1981. This route is known as "Humble Horse" (IV, 5.7, W4).

== Geology ==
Diadem Peak is composed of sedimentary rock laid down from the Precambrian to Jurassic periods. Formed in shallow seas, this sedimentary rock was pushed east and over the top of younger rock during the Laramide orogeny.

== Climate ==
Based on the Köppen climate classification, Diadem Peak is located in a subarctic climate with cold, snowy winters, and mild summers. Temperatures can drop below -20 °C with wind chill factors below -30 °C.

== Gallery ==
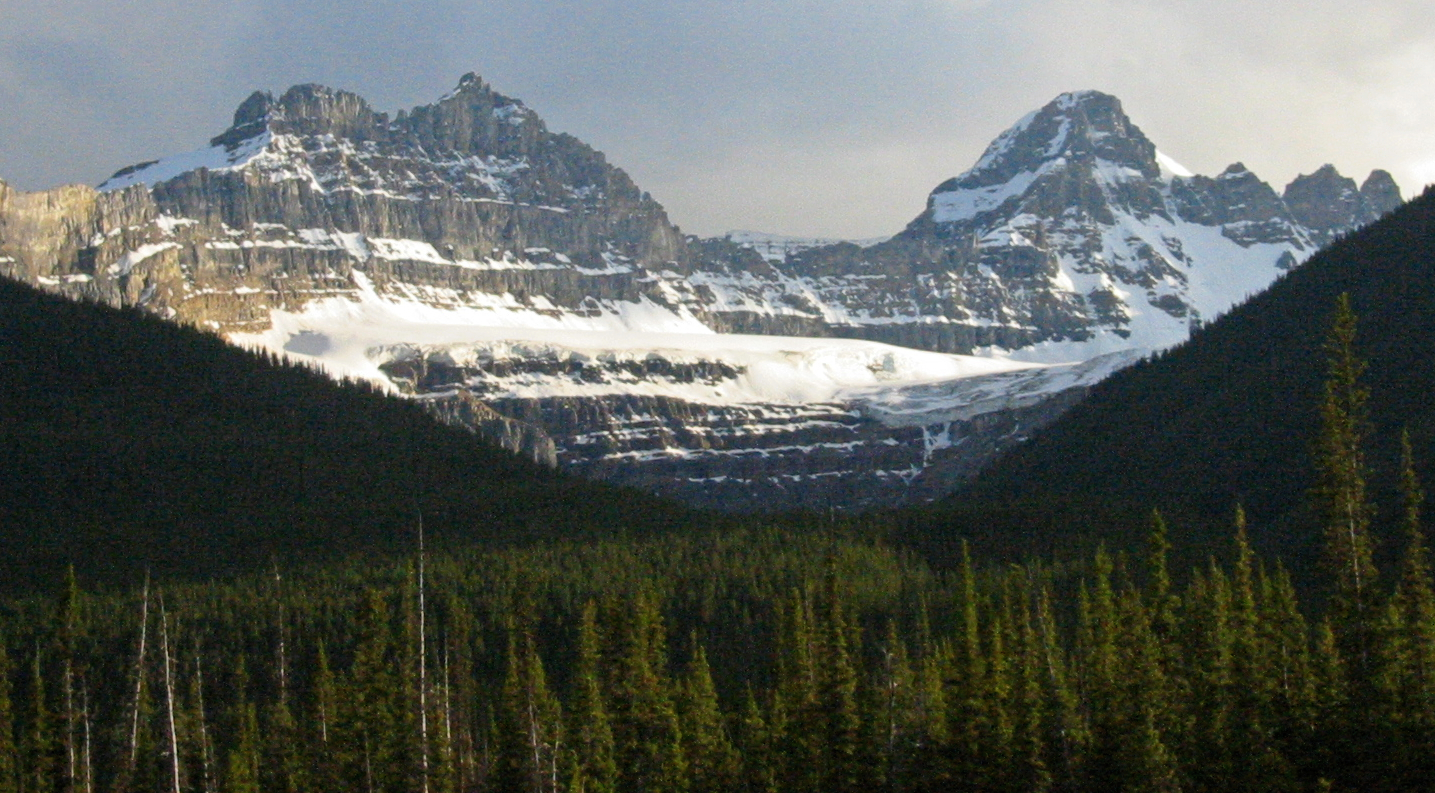
Mushroom Peak (left) and Diadem Peak (right) seen from the Icefields Parkway

== See also ==
- List of mountains in the Canadian Rockies
