= Mount Palmer (Alberta) =

Mountain in Alberta, Canada

- Location within Alberta

Highest point
- Elevation: 3,150 m (10,330 ft)
- Prominence: 270 m (890 ft)
- Listing: Mountains of Alberta
- Coordinates: 52°21′10″N 117°31′14″W

Geography
- Country: Canada
- Province: Alberta
- Protected area: Jasper National Park
- Parent range: Winston Churchill Range
- Topo map: NTS 83C5 Fortress Lake

Climbing
- First ascent: 1953 by G. Harr, G. Roberts, Mr. and Mrs. Mendenhall, R. Van Aken
- Easiest route: rock/snow climb

Mount Palmer is a mountain located in the Athabasca River Valley of Jasper National Park in Alberta, Canada.

Mt. Palmer lies southeast of Gong Lake. The mountain was named after American Howard Palmer, an early 20th-century explorer of the Selkirks and the Canadian Rockies.

== See also ==
- List of mountains in the Canadian Rockies
