= Sunwapta Falls =

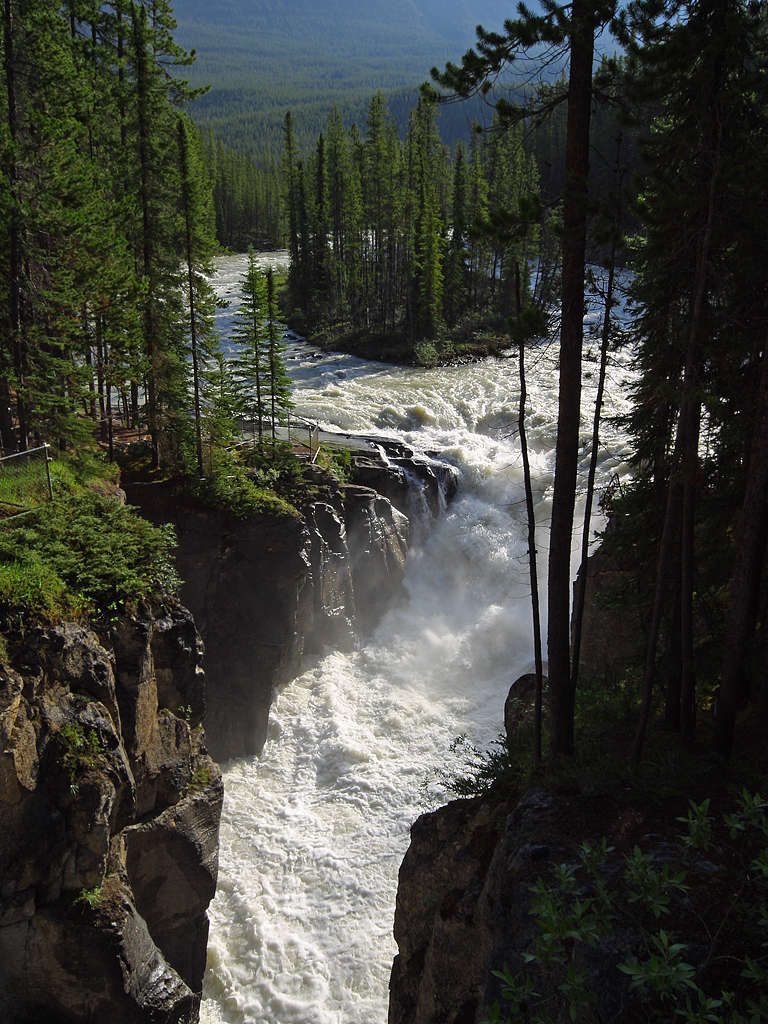

- Location within Alberta
- Location: Jasper National Park, Alberta, Canada
- Coordinates: 52°31′56″N 117°38′43″W
- Type: Class 6
- Total height: 18.5 m (61 ft)
- Total width: 9.1 m (30 ft)
- Watercourse: Sunwapta River

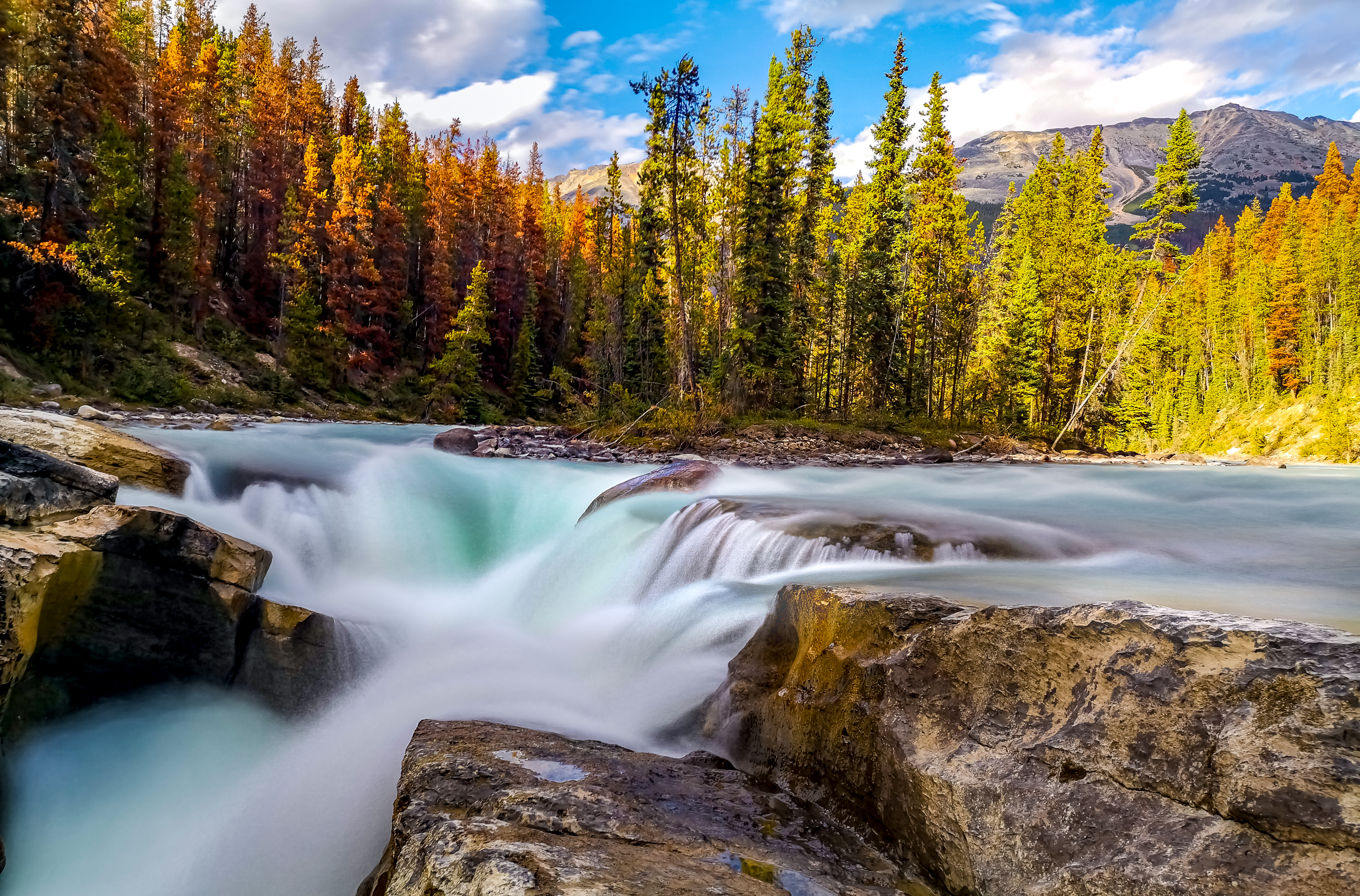
Sunwapta Falls

Sunwapta Falls is a pair of waterfalls of the Sunwapta River in Jasper National Park, Alberta, Canada.

The falls are accessible via a 600-metre (2,000 ft) access road off the Icefields Parkway, which connects Jasper and Banff National Parks. The falls have a drop of about 18.5 metres (61 feet).

Sunwapta is a Stoney language word that means "turbulent water".

There are two falls, a lower and an upper one. The one most people see is the upper falls, as access is easier. The lower falls are a short distance away. The water originates from the Athabasca Glacier, and volumes are higher in early summer because of glacial melting. It is a Class 6 waterfall, with a drop of 18 m (60 ft) and a width of 9.1 m (30 ft).

== See also ==
- List of waterfalls
- List of waterfalls of Canada
- Canadian Rockies
- North America
- Wildlife of Canada
