= Mount Adam Joachim =

Mountain in Jasper NP, Alberta, Canada

- Location within Alberta

Highest point
- Elevation: 3,090 m (10,140 ft) (Note: Other sources state 3094 m.)
- Prominence: 440 m (1,440 ft)
- Listing: Mountains of Alberta
- Coordinates: 52°24′16″N 117°31′40″W

Geography
- Country: Canada
- Province: Alberta
- Protected area: Jasper National Park
- Parent range: Winston Churchill Range
- Topo map: NTS 83C5 Fortress Lake

Climbing
- First ascent: 1938 Survey party

Mount Adam Joachim is a mountain four kilometres ENE of Gong Lake in Canada's Jasper National Park. It was named in 1968 by J. Monroe Thorington after Adam Joachim. Joachim, a partial Cree Indian, was a horse packer who accompanied Alfred J. Ostheimer on his 1927 expedition into the Columbia Icefield.

== See also ==
- List of mountains in the Canadian Rockies
