= Sunwapta Peak =

Mountain in Alberta, Canada

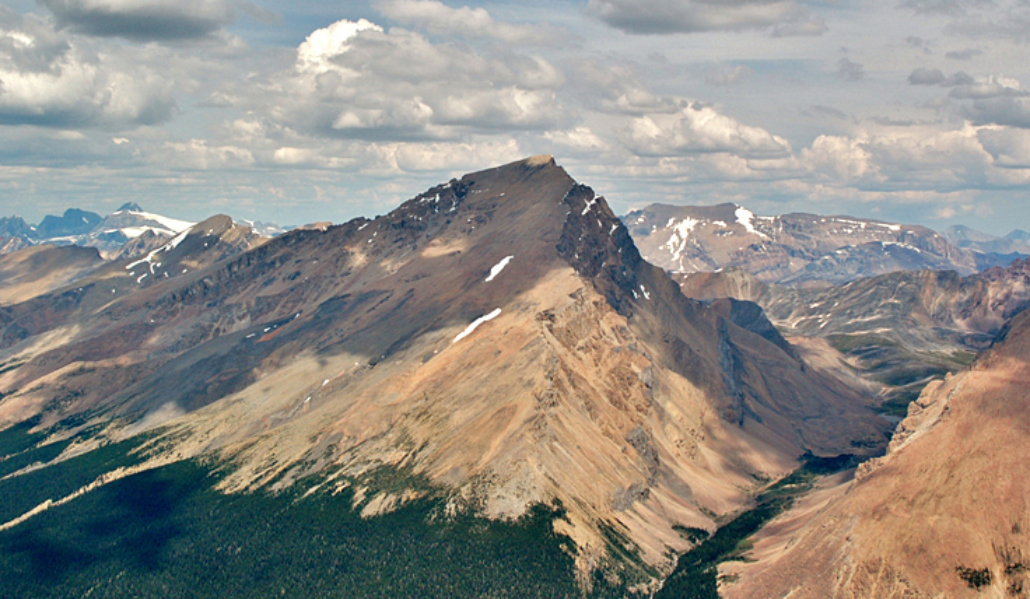
- South Face of Sunwapta Peak seen from Tangle Ridge

Highest point
- Elevation: 3,315 m (10,876 ft)
- Prominence: 1,014 m (3,327 ft)
- Listing: Mountains of Alberta
- Coordinates: 52°20′55″N 117°16′30″W

Geography
- Location within Alberta
- Interactive map of Sunwapta Peak
- Location: Alberta, Canada
- Parent range: Canadian Rockies
- Topo map: NTS 83C6 Sunwapta Peak

Climbing
- First ascent: 1906 by Jimmy Simpson
- Easiest route: Easy scramble

Sunwapta Peak is a peak in the Sunwapta River valley of Jasper National Park, just north of the Columbia Icefield in Alberta, Canada. The peak was named in 1892 after the Stoney language word sunwapta meaning "turbulent river". The mountain can be seen from the Icefields Parkway (Highway 93).

== Routes ==
The normal climbing route (an easy scramble) is via the southwest slopes, requiring an elevation gain of 1,735 m (5,692 ft) to the summit from the trail head beside the Icefields Parkway.

== Geology ==
Sunwapta Peak is composed of sedimentary rock laid down from the Precambrian to Jurassic periods that was pushed east and over the top of younger rock during the Laramide orogeny.

== Climate ==
Based on the Köppen climate classification, Sunwapta Peak is in a subarctic climate zone with cold, snowy winters, and mild summers. Temperatures can drop below −20 °C with wind chill factors below −30 °C. Precipitation runoff from Sunwapta Peak drains into the Sunwapta River which is a tributary of the Athabasca River.

== Gallery ==
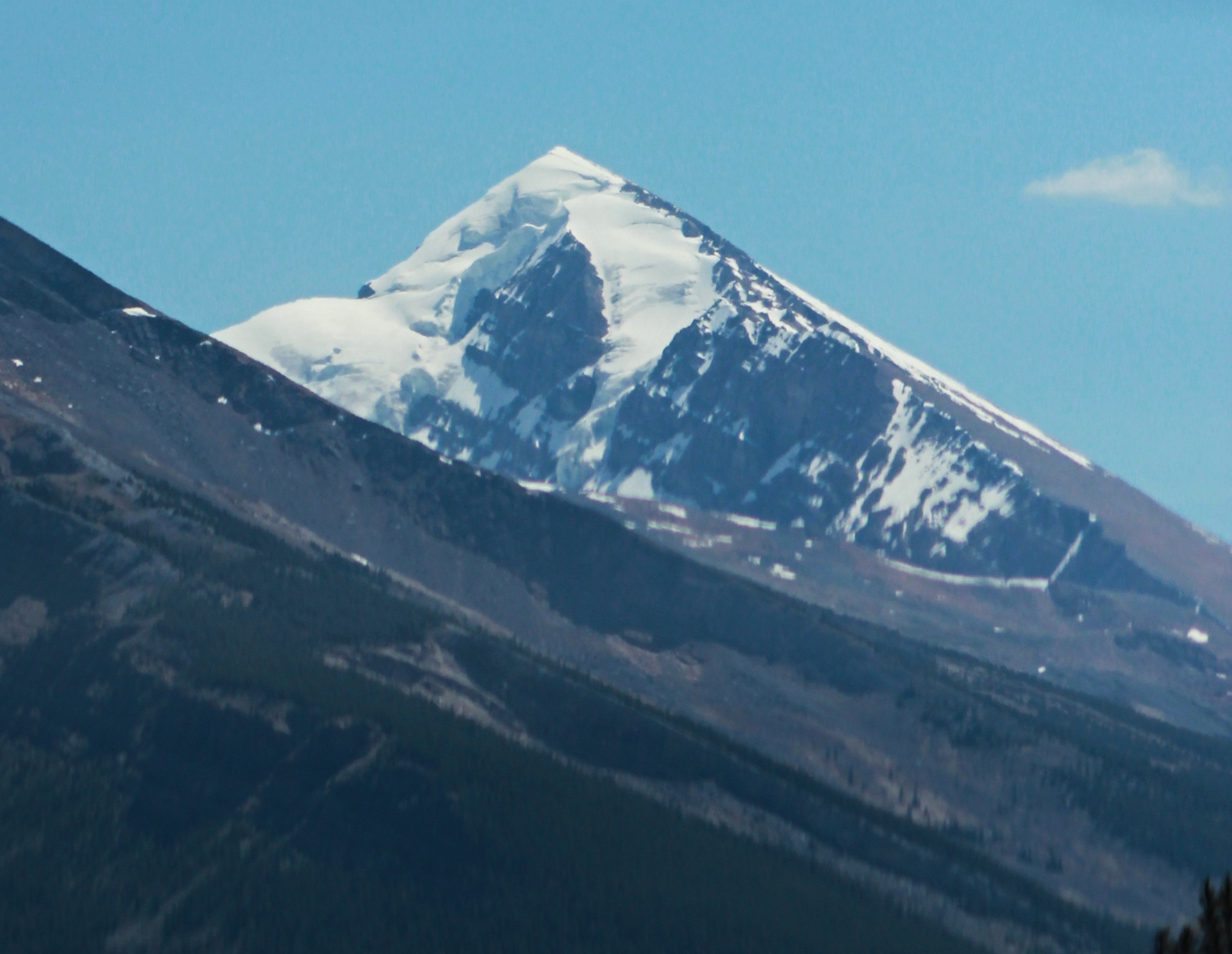
Sunwapta Peak from southbound on the Icefields Parkway
