= Sunwapta River =

River in Alberta, Canada

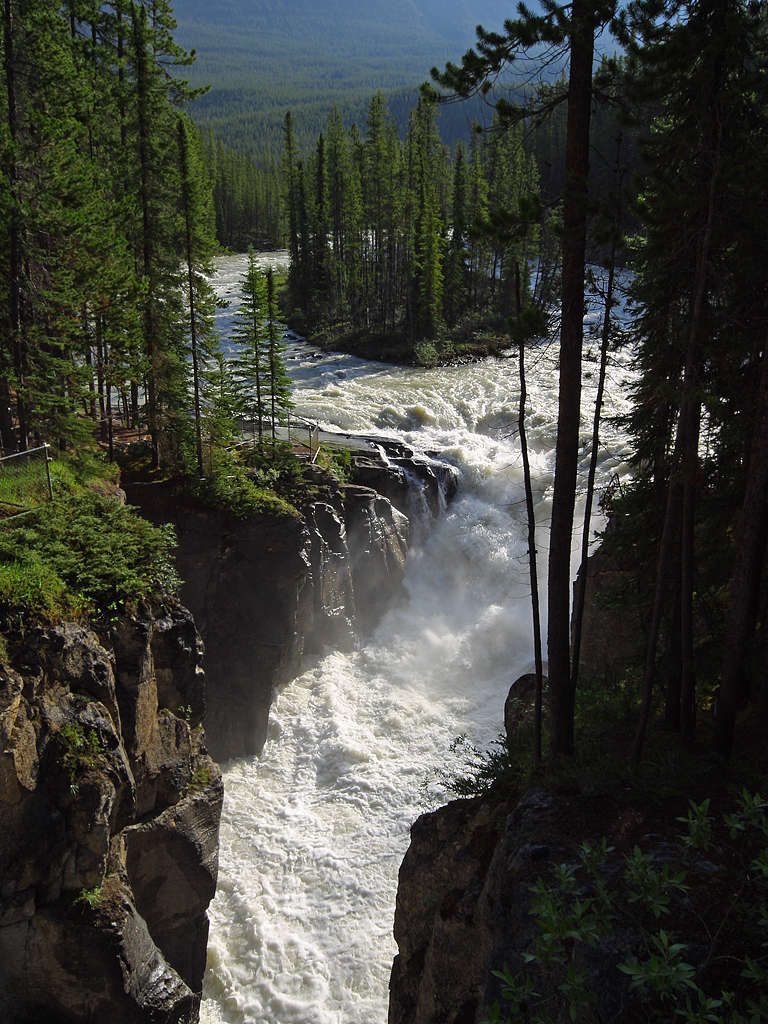
- Sunwapta Falls

Location
- Country: Canada
- Province: Alberta

Physical characteristics
- Source
  - location: Athabasca Glacier
  - coordinates: 52°12′30″N 117°14′14″W
  - elevation: 2,037 m (6,683 ft)
- Mouth
  - location: Athabasca River
  - coordinates: 52°31′41″N 117°41′05″W
  - elevation: 1,300 m (4,300 ft)

The Sunwapta River is a major tributary of the Athabasca River in Jasper National Park in Alberta, Canada.

== Course ==
The headwaters of the Sunwapta River are near the Columbia Icefield in the valley west-northwest of Sunwapta Pass, which divides Jasper National Park from Banff National Park. Several kilometres down the valley from the pass is Sunwapta Lake, at the toe of the Athabasca Glacier, which is considered the nominal source for the river. The Sunwapta River then continues to run northwest through Jasper National Park, following the Icefields Parkway, and finally joins the Athabasca River shortly after Sunwapta Falls.

Sunwapta is a Stoney language word meaning "turbulent river". Geologist A. P. Coleman named the river in 1892.

== Tributaries ==
- Kitchener Creek
- Tangle Creek
- Woolley Creek
- Beauty Creek
- Diadem Creek
- Grizzly Creek
- Jonas Creek
- Poboktan Creek
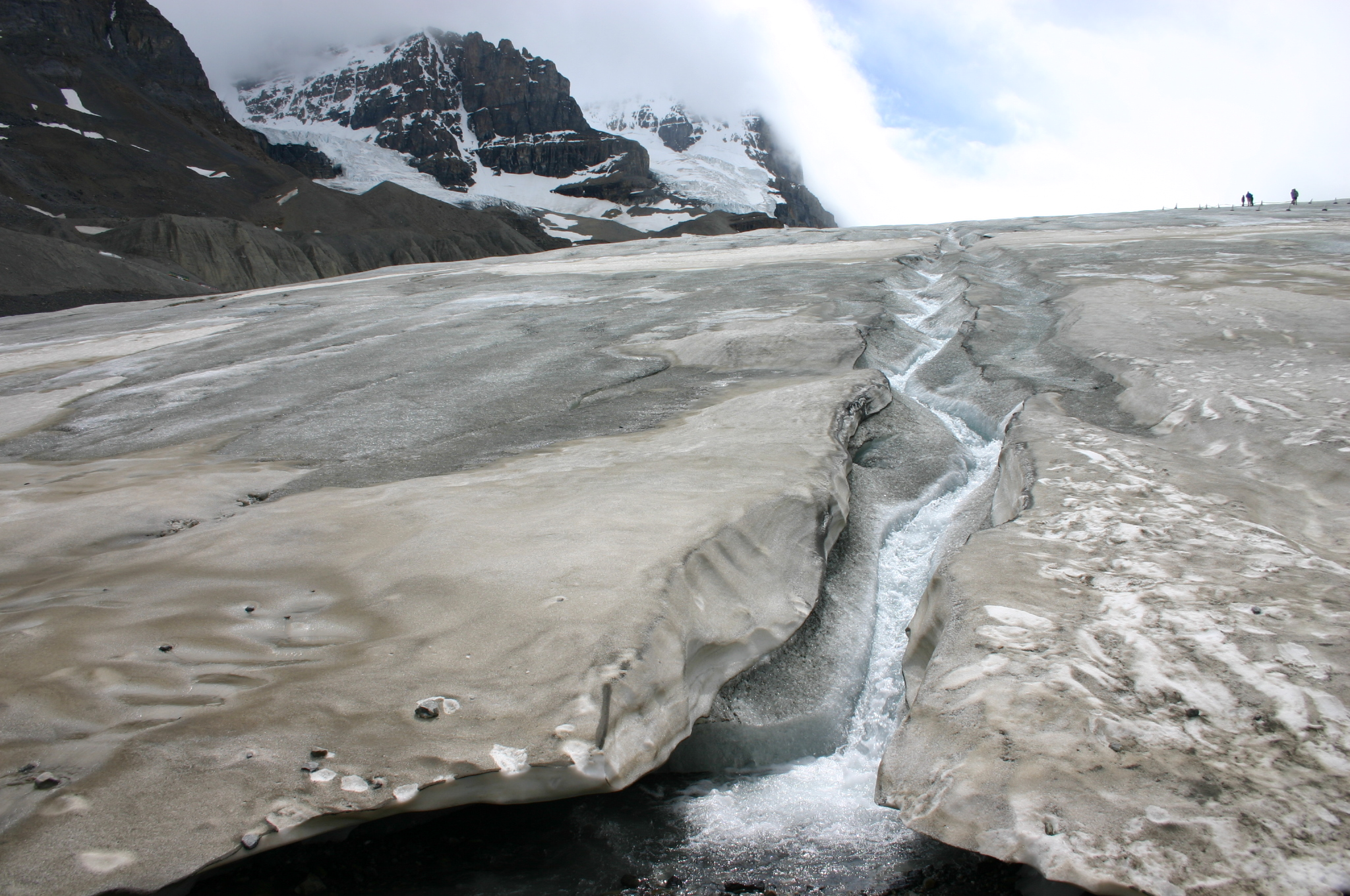
Sunwapta River originates at the toe of the Athabasca Glacier

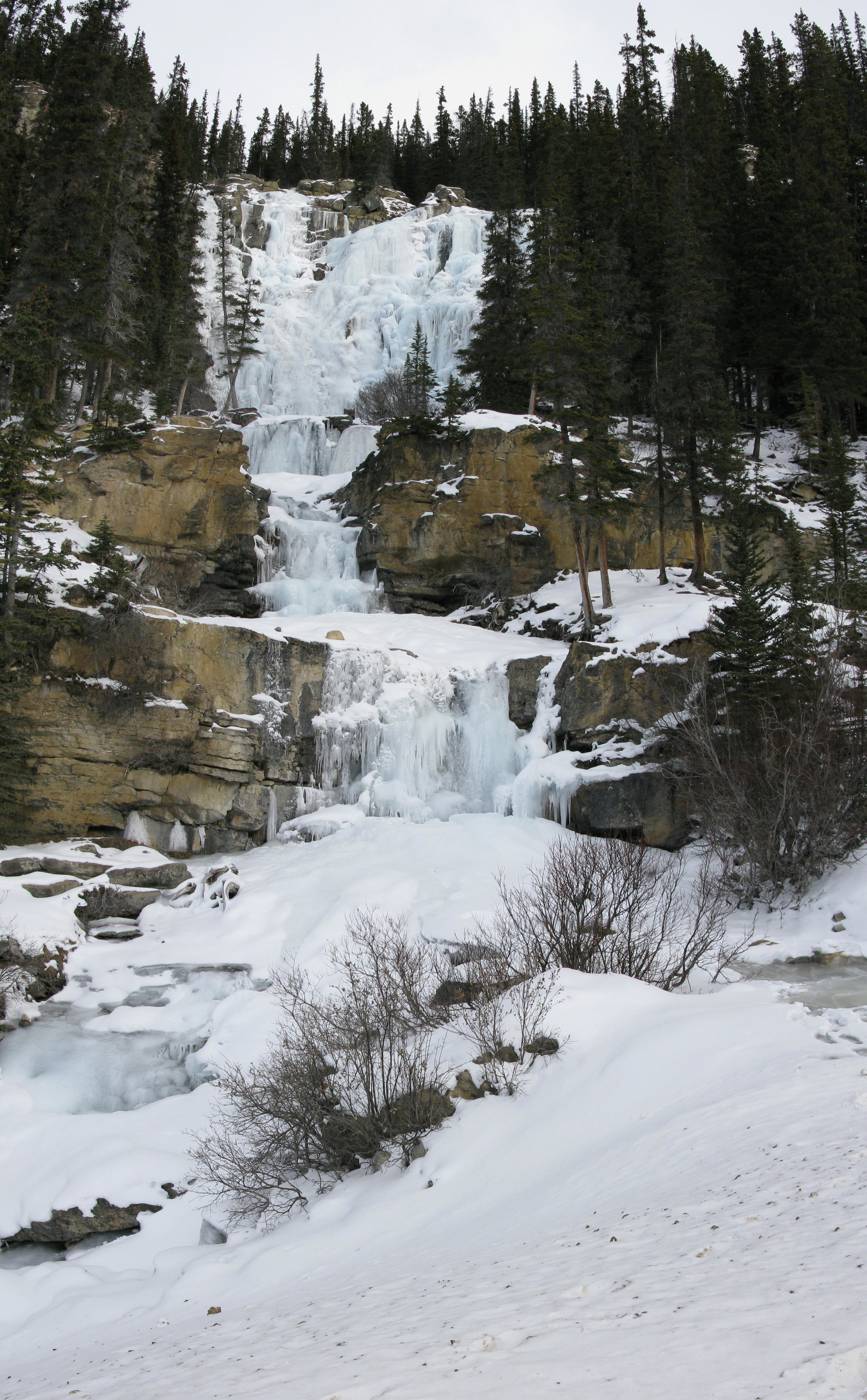
Tangle Creek, a tributary of the Sunwapta

== See also ==
- List of rivers of Alberta
