= Mount Owen (British Columbia) =

Mountain in Canada

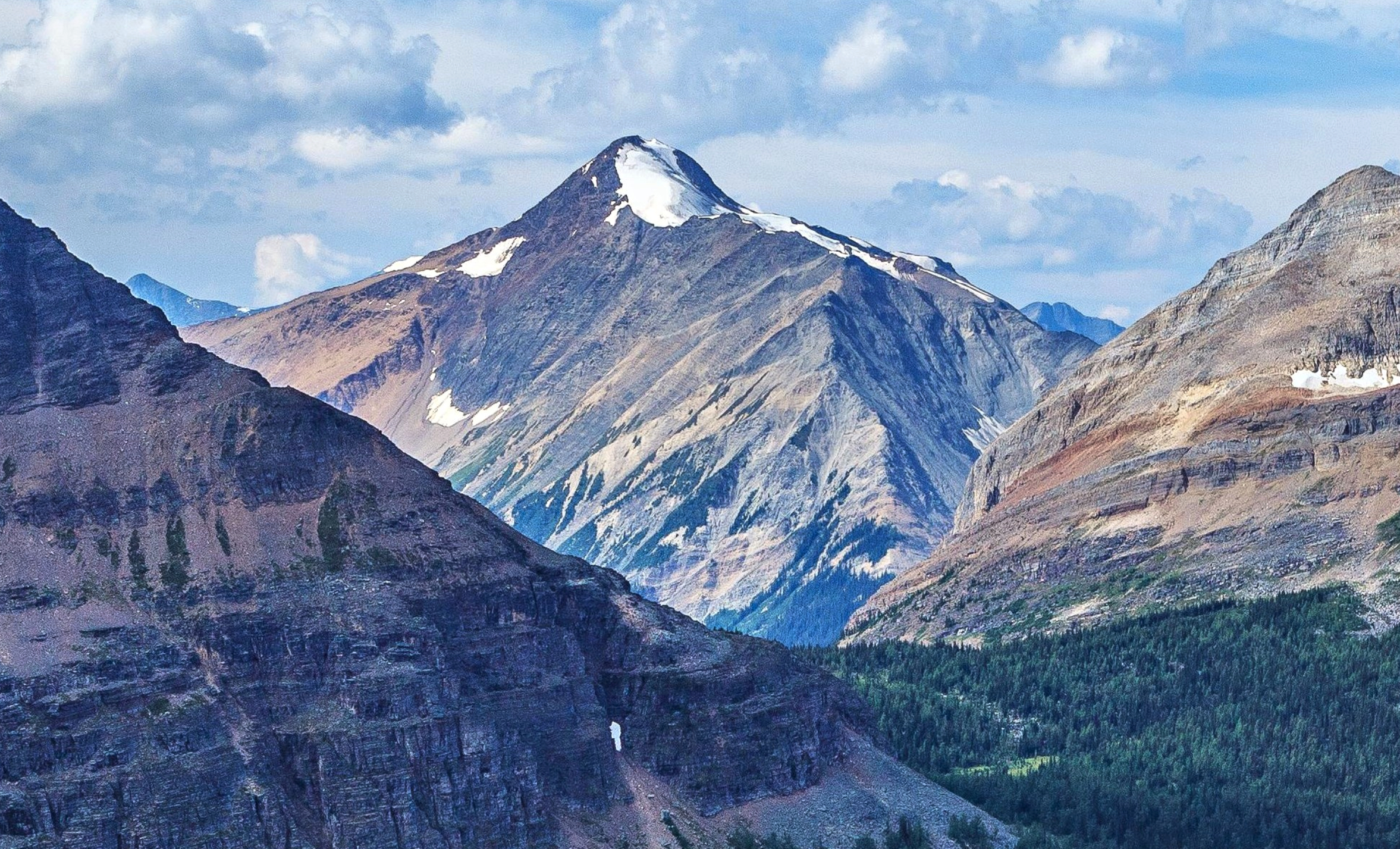
- East aspect

Highest point
- Elevation: 3,083 m (10,115 ft)
- Prominence: 903 m (2,963 ft)
- Isolation: 5.42 km (3.37 mi)
- Listing: Mountains of British Columbia
- Coordinates: 51°18′58″N 116°25′13″W

Naming
- Etymology: Frank Owen

Geography
- Location within British Columbia Location within Canada
- Interactive map of Mount Owen
- Country: Canada
- Province: British Columbia
- District: Kootenay Land District
- Protected area: Yoho National Park
- Parent range: Bow Range; Park Ranges; Canadian Rockies
- Topo map: NTS 82N8 Lake Louise

Geology
- Rock age: Cambrian
- Rock type: Sedimentary rock

Climbing
- First ascent: 1892

Mount Owen is a 3,083-metre (10,115-foot) summit in British Columbia, Canada.

== Description ==
Mount Owen is located in Yoho National Park, in the Bow Range of the Canadian Rockies. Precipitation runoff from Mount Owen drains into tributaries of the Ottertail River which in turn is a tributary of the Kicking Horse River. Mount Owen is more notable for its steep rise above local terrain than for its absolute elevation as topographic relief is significant with the summit rising approximately 1,700 meters (5,577 ft) above the Ottertail River Valley in 3 km (1.9 mi). The nearest higher neighbor is Odaray Mountain, 5.54 km (3.44 mi) to the north-northeast.

== History ==
The first ascent of the mountain was made in 1892 by Canadian surveyor James J. McArthur who named the mountain for his survey party member, Frank Owen. The mountain's toponym was officially adopted on March 31, 1924, by the Geographical Names Board of Canada.

== Geology ==
Mount Owen is composed of sedimentary rock laid down during the Precambrian to Jurassic periods. Formed in shallow seas, this sedimentary rock was pushed east and over the top of younger rock during the Laramide orogeny.

== Climate ==
Based on the Köppen climate classification, Mount Owen is located in a subarctic climate zone with cold, snowy winters, and mild summers. Winter temperatures can drop below −20 °C with wind chill factors below −30 °C. This climate supports a small unnamed glacier on the north slope.

== Gallery ==
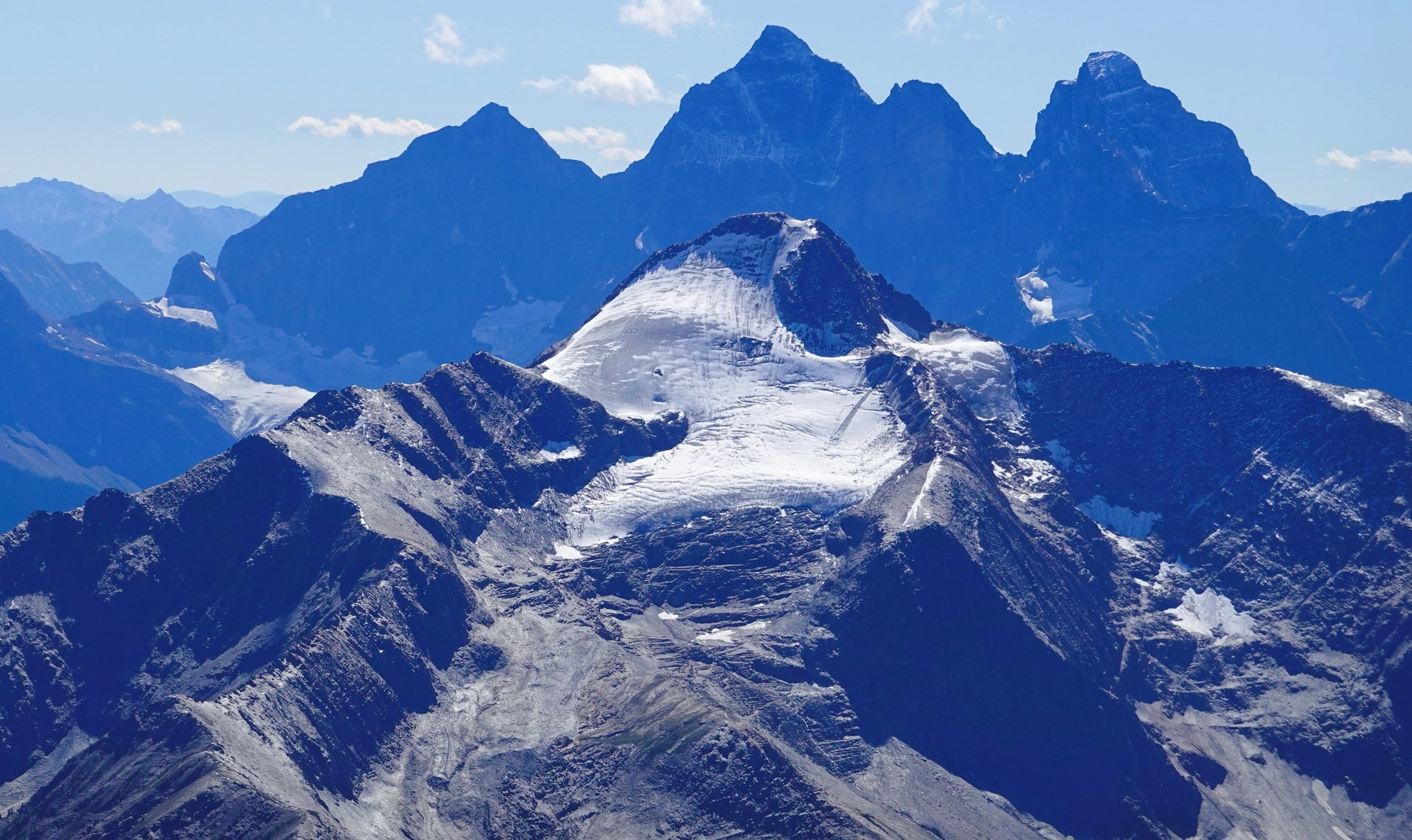
North aspect of Mount Owen (front) and Mount Goodsir (back) viewed from Mount Stephen

== See also ==
- Geography of British Columbia
