= Mount Dennis (disambiguation) =

Mount Dennis is a neighbourhood in Toronto.

Mount Dennis may also refer to:

- Mount Dennis station, an intermodal transit terminal in the Mount Dennis neighbourhood
- Kodak Mount Dennis Campus, or Kodak Heights, a former industrial park in the Mount Dennis neighbourhood
- Mount Dennis (Yoho), a mountain summit in British Columbia, Canada
