= Mount McArthur =

Mount McArthur may refer to:

- Mount McArthur (Antarctica)
- Mount McArthur (British Columbia)
