= Mount Duchesnay =

Summit in Canada

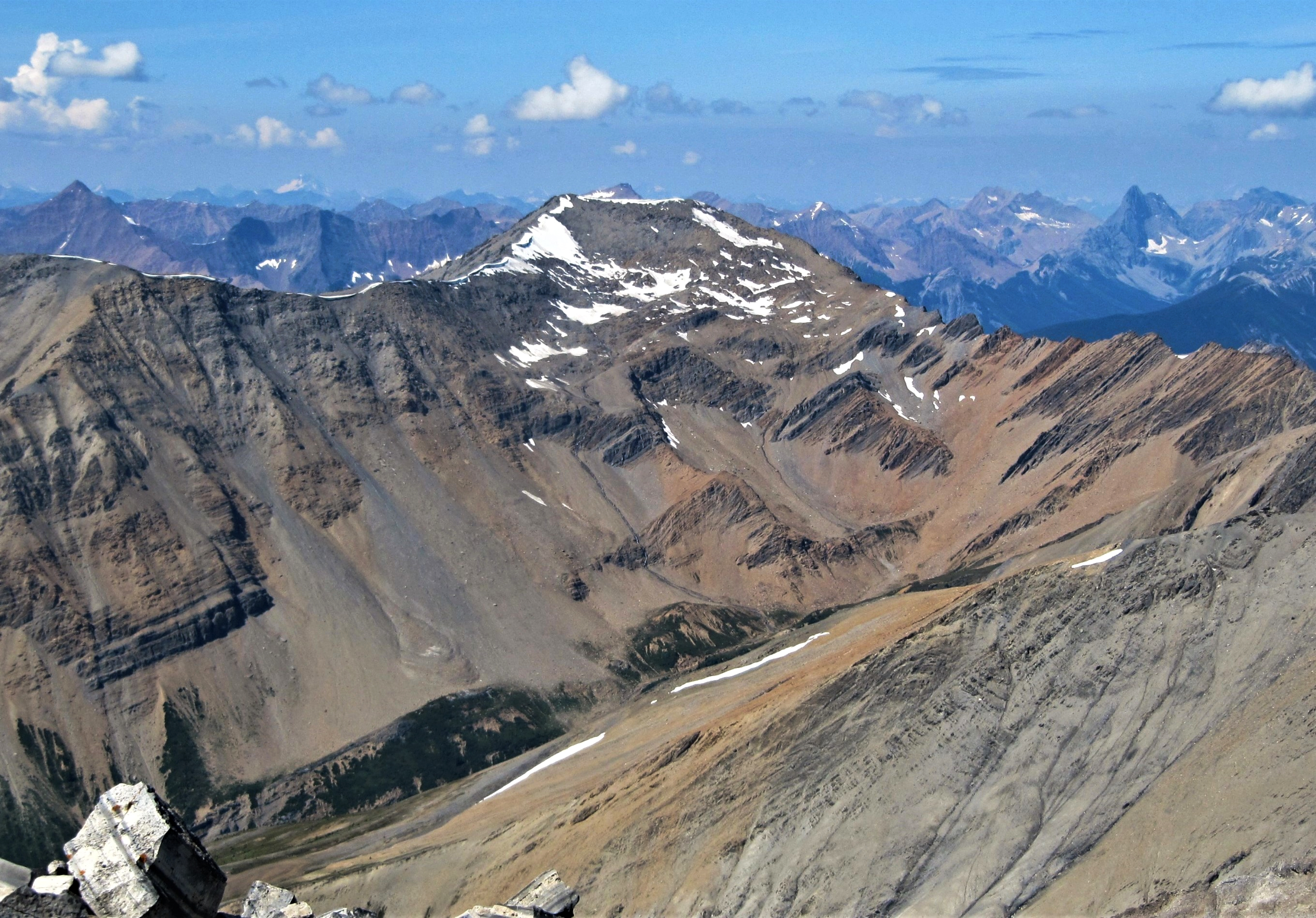
- East aspect

Highest point
- Elevation: 2,927 m (9,603 ft)
- Prominence: 257 m (843 ft)
- Parent peak: Mount Stephen (3200 m)
- Isolation: 3.94 km (2.45 mi)
- Listing: Mountains of British Columbia
- Coordinates: 51°21′25″N 116°27′15″W

Naming
- Etymology: Charles-Edmond Juchereau Duchesnay

Geography
- Location within British Columbia Location within Canada
- Interactive map of Mount Duchesnay
- Country: Canada
- Province: British Columbia
- District: Kootenay Land District
- Protected area: Yoho National Park
- Parent range: Bow Range; Park Ranges; Canadian Rockies
- Topo map: NTS 82N8 Lake Louise

Geology
- Rock age: Cambrian
- Rock type: Sedimentary rock

Climbing
- First ascent: 1905 by Topographical Survey

Mount Duchesnay is a 2,927-metre (9,603-foot) summit in British Columbia, Canada.

== Description ==
Mount Duchesnay is located in Yoho National Park, in the Bow Range of the Canadian Rockies. Precipitation runoff from Mount Duchesnay drains into tributaries of the Kicking Horse River which is a tributary of the Columbia River. Mount Duchesnay is more notable for its steep rise above local terrain than for its absolute elevation as topographic relief is significant with the summit rising over 1,700 meters (5,577 ft) above the Kicking Horse Valley in less than 5 km (3.1 mi). The peak is visible from Highway 1 (the Trans-Canada Highway). The nearest higher neighbor is Mount Stephen, 4.87 km (3.03 mi) to the north-northeast.

== History ==
At the suggestion of James Outram, the mountain was named in 1902 by David McNicoll (vice-president of Canadian Pacific Railway) to remember Charles-Edmond Juchereau Duchesnay (June 23, 1854 – September 4, 1901), Assistant General Superintendent of the railway's Western Division and son of Elzéar-Henri Juchereau Duchesnay. Duchesnay was killed by rockfall in a tunnel under construction near Spuzzum on September 4, 1901. The first ascent of the mountain was made in 1905 by a topographical survey team. The mountain's toponym was officially adopted on March 31, 1917, by the Geographical Names Board of Canada.

== Geology ==
Mount Duchesnay is composed of sedimentary rock laid down during the Precambrian to Jurassic periods. Formed in shallow seas, this sedimentary rock was pushed east and over the top of younger rock during the Laramide orogeny.

== Climate ==
Based on the Köppen climate classification, Mount Duchesnay is located in a subarctic climate zone with cold, snowy winters, and mild summers. Winter temperatures can drop below −20 °C with wind chill factors below −30 °C.

== See also ==
- Geography of British Columbia
