= Mount Dennis (Yoho) =

Mountain in Yoho NP, BC, Canada

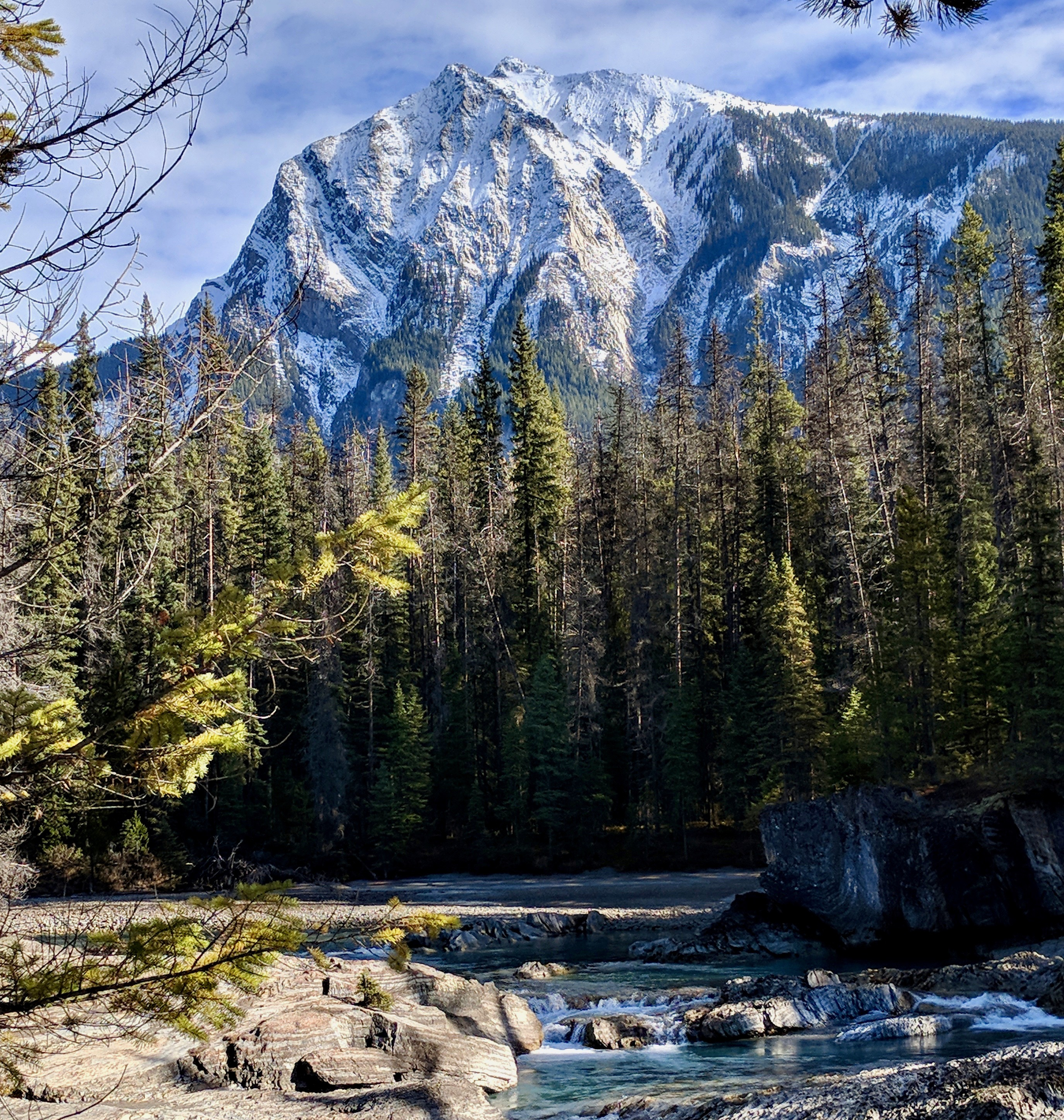
- West aspect of Mount Dennis

Highest point
- Elevation: 2,549 m (8,363 ft)
- Prominence: 269 m (883 ft)
- Parent peak: Mount Stephen (3200 m)
- Listing: Mountains of British Columbia
- Coordinates: 51°22′28″N 116°28′50″W

Naming
- Etymology: John Stoughton Dennis

Geography
- Location within British Columbia Location within Canada
- Interactive map of Mount Dennis
- Country: Canada
- Province: British Columbia
- District: Kootenay Land District
- Protected area: Yoho National Park
- Parent range: Park Ranges
- Topo map: NTS 82N8 Lake Louise

Geology
- Rock age: Cambrian
- Rock type: sedimentary rock

Climbing
- First ascent: 1887 James J. McArthur

Mount Dennis is a 2,549-metre (8,363-foot) mountain summit located three kilometres south of Field in Yoho National Park, in the Park Ranges of British Columbia, Canada. The nearest higher neighbor is Mount Stephen, 4.0 km (2.5 mi) to the northeast, and Mount Burgess is six kilometres north on the opposite side of the Kicking Horse River valley. Mount Dennis has over 1,200-metre (3,900-foot) of vertical relief above Highway 1, the Trans-Canada Highway, which traverses the northwest foot of the mountain. Precipitation runoff from Mount Dennis drains into tributaries of the Kicking Horse River which in turn is a tributary of the Columbia River.

== History ==
The first ascent of the mountain was made in 1887 by James J. McArthur of the Dominion Land Survey.

The mountain was named in 1916 by Alexander MacKinnon Burgess for Lieutenant-Colonel John Stoughton Dennis (1820–1885), a Canadian surveyor who proposed the Dominion Land Survey system in 1869.

The mountain's toponym was officially adopted in 1924 by the Geographical Names Board of Canada.

== Geology ==
Mount Dennis is composed of sedimentary rock laid down during the Precambrian to Jurassic periods. Formed in shallow seas, this sedimentary rock was pushed east and over the top of younger rock during the Laramide orogeny.

== Climate ==
Based on the Köppen climate classification, Mount Dennis is located in a subarctic climate zone with cold, snowy winters, and mild summers. Winter temperatures can drop below −20 °C with wind chill factors below −30 °C. Weather conditions during winter make Mount Dennis one of the premier places in the Rockies for ice climbing.

== Ice climbing routes ==
Ice climbing routes with grades on Mount Dennis

- Carlsberg Column - WI5
- Guinness Gully - WI4
- Pilsner Pillar - WI6
- Cascade Kronenbourg - WI6
- Last Call - WI3

== Gallery ==
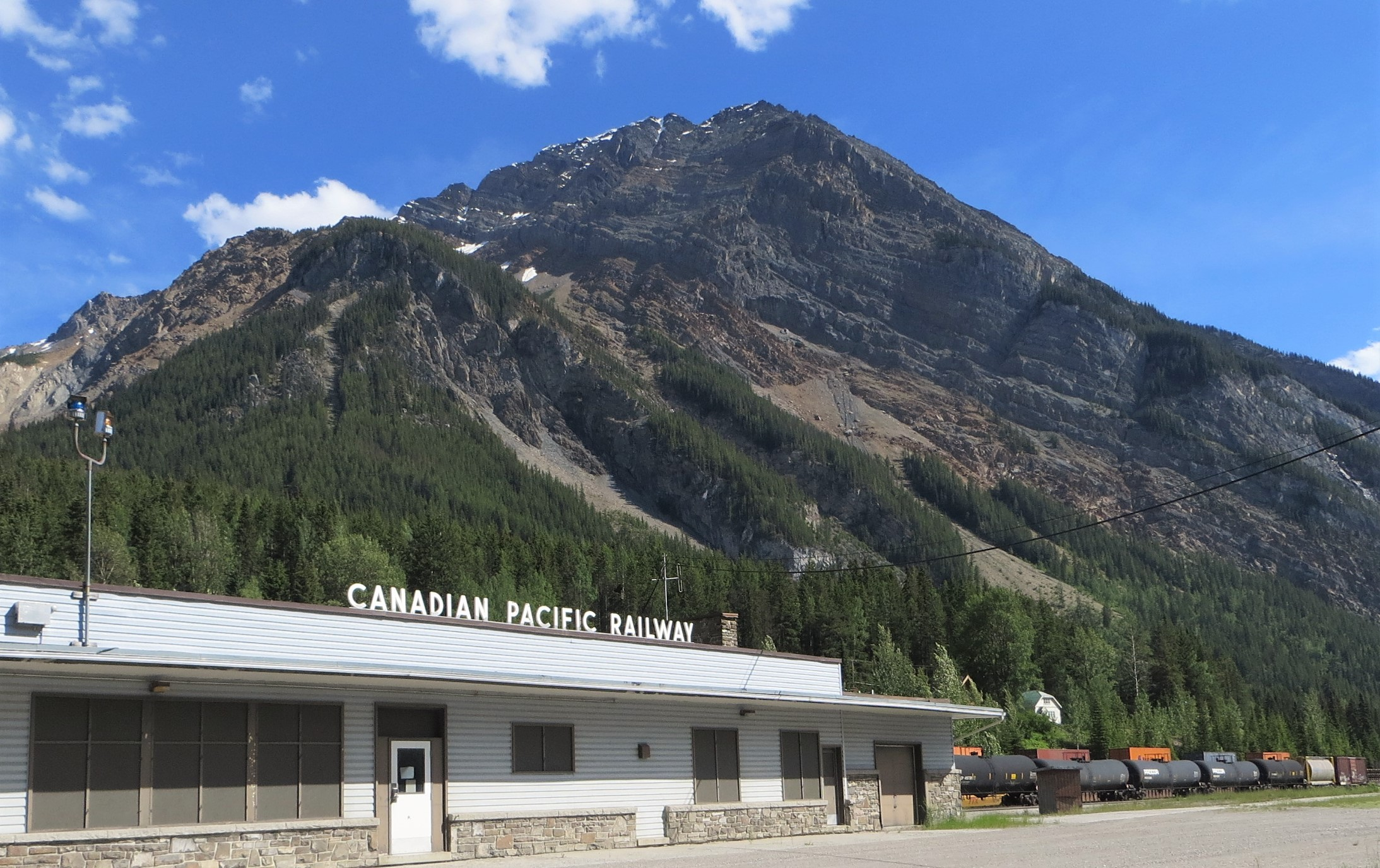
Mount Dennis from Field, British Columbia

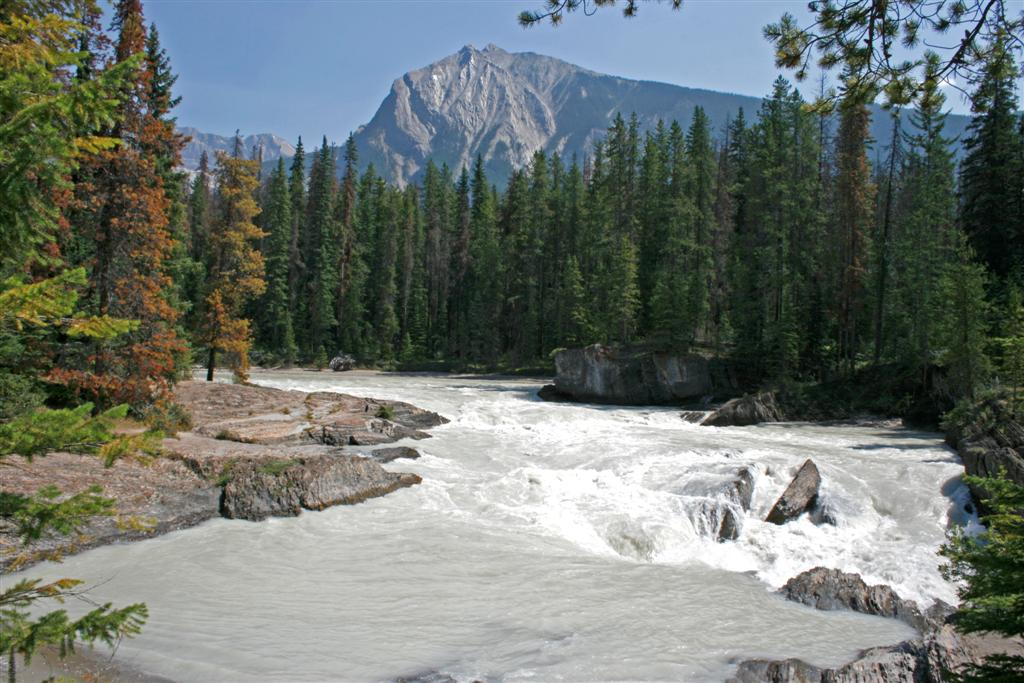
Mount Dennis and Kicking Horse River

== See also ==
- Geography of British Columbia
