= Mount Andromache =

Mountain in Canada

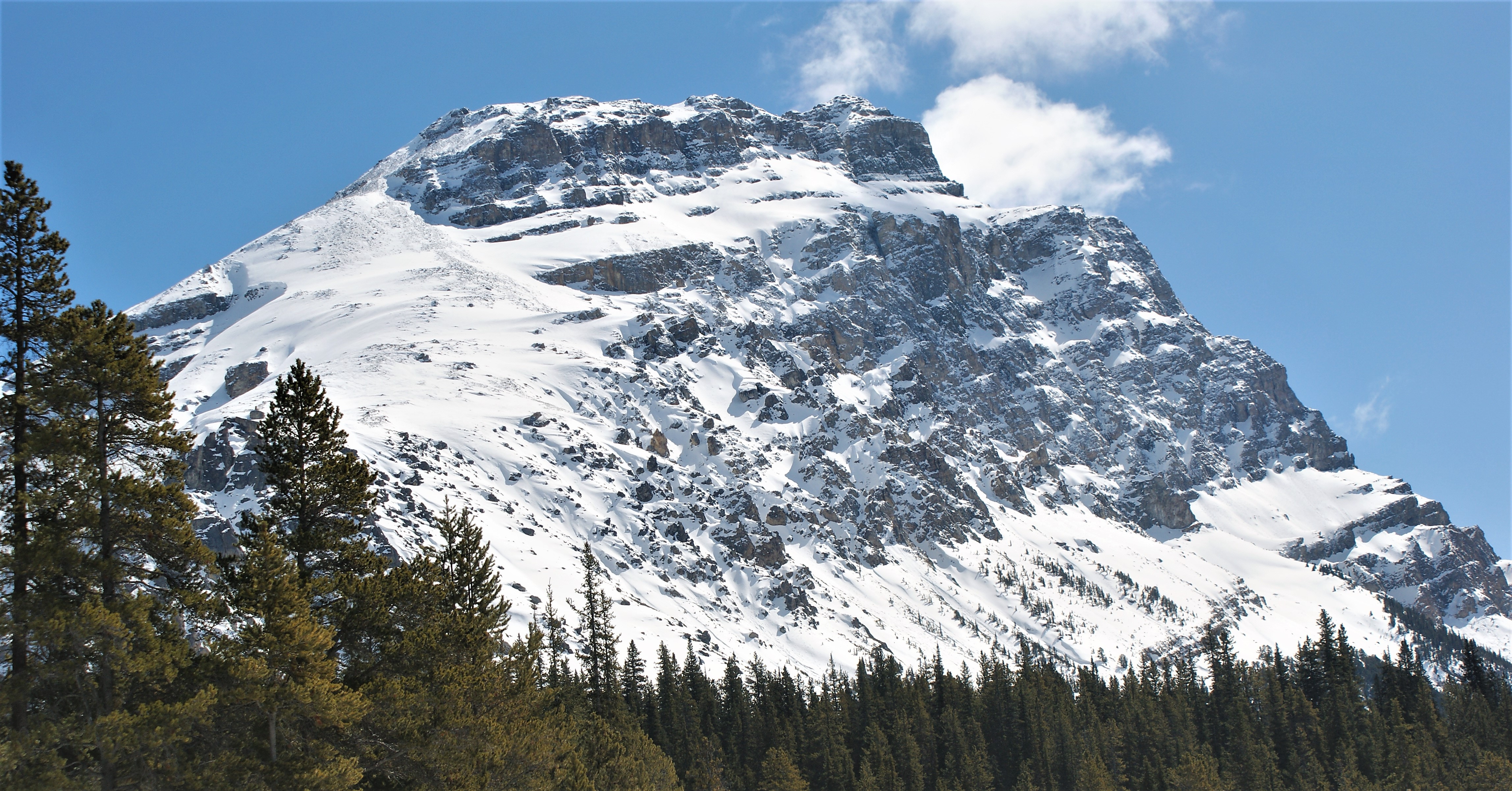
- Northwest aspect

Highest point
- Elevation: 3,033 m (9,951 ft)
- Prominence: 518 m (1,699 ft)
- Parent peak: Mount Hector (3394 m)
- Listing: Mountains of Alberta
- Coordinates: 51°36′43″N 116°16′27″W

Geography
- Location within Alberta Location within Canada
- Country: Canada
- Province: Alberta
- Parent range: Front Ranges; Canadian Rockies
- Topo map: NTS 82N9 Hector Lake

Geology
- Rock age: Cambrian
- Rock type: Sedimentary rock

Climbing
- First ascent: 1887 James J. McArthur and Tom Riley, Dominion Land Survey
- Easiest route: Scramble

Mount Andromache is a 3,033-metre (9,951-foot) mountain summit located in the Bow River valley of Banff National Park, in the Canadian Rockies of Alberta, Canada. The nearest higher neighbor is Mount Hector, 4.00 km (2.49 mi) to the south. Mount Andromache can be seen from the Icefields Parkway as the road traverses the western base of the peak. Topographic relief is significant as the summit rises 1,180 m (3,870 ft) above the parkway in 1.5 km (0.93 mi). The Molar Glacier is situated on the northeast aspect of the mountain. Precipitation runoff from Mount Andromache drains into tributaries of the Bow River.

== History ==
The first ascent of the mountain was made in 1887 by James J. McArthur and Tom Riley of the Dominion Land Survey. Mount Andromache was named in 1948 by the Alpine Club of Canada for Andromache, who in Greek mythology was the wife of Hector.

== Climate ==
Based on the Köppen climate classification, Mount Andromache is located in a subarctic climate with cold, snowy winters, and mild summers. Winter temperatures can drop below −20 °C with wind chill factors below −30 °C. The months July through September offer the most favorable weather for viewing and climbing this mountain.

== Geology ==
Like other mountains in Banff Park, Mount Andromache is composed of sedimentary rock laid down during the Precambrian to Jurassic periods. Formed in shallow seas, this sedimentary rock was pushed east and over the top of younger rock during the Laramide orogeny.

== Gallery ==
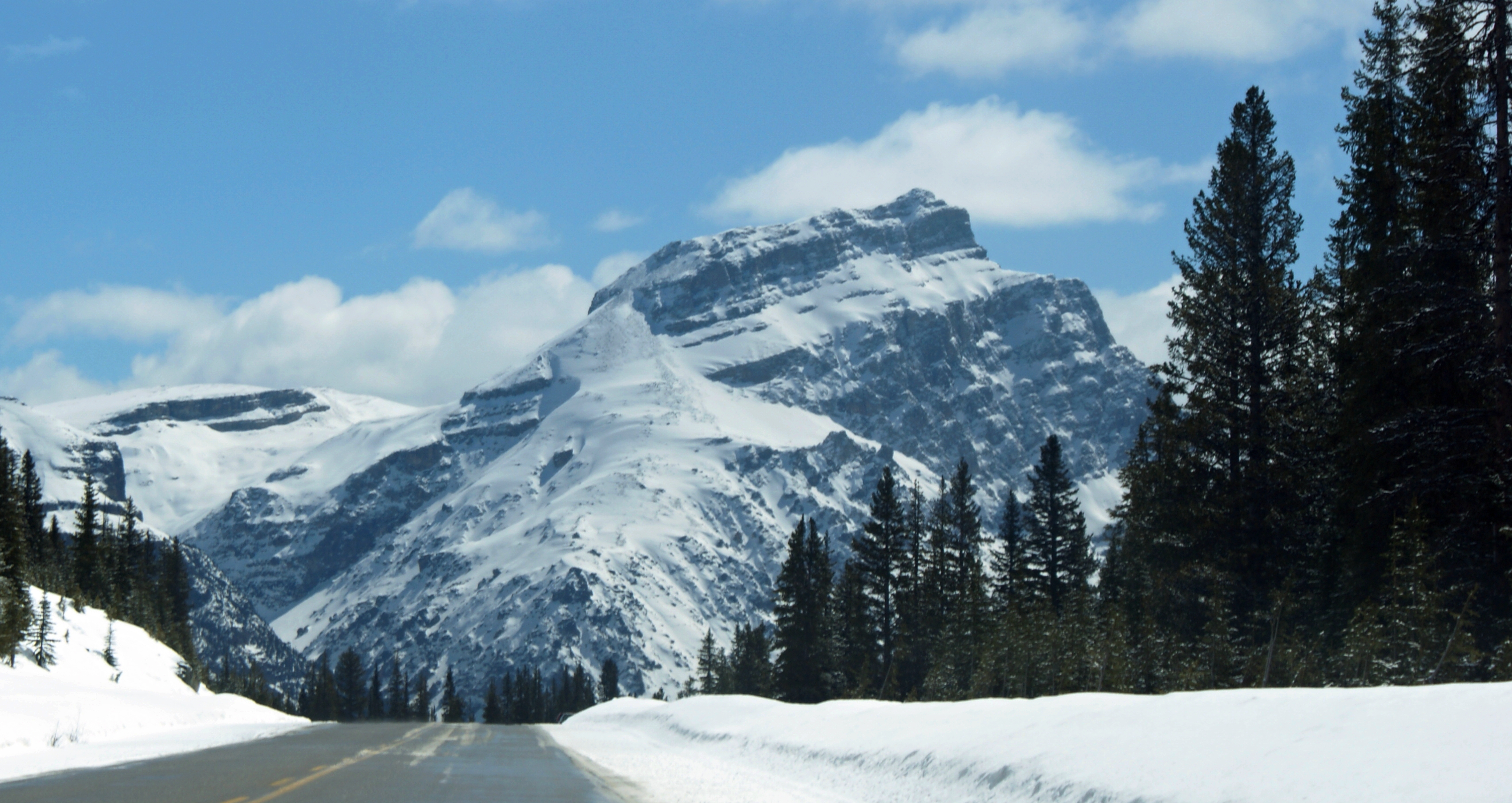
Mt. Andromache

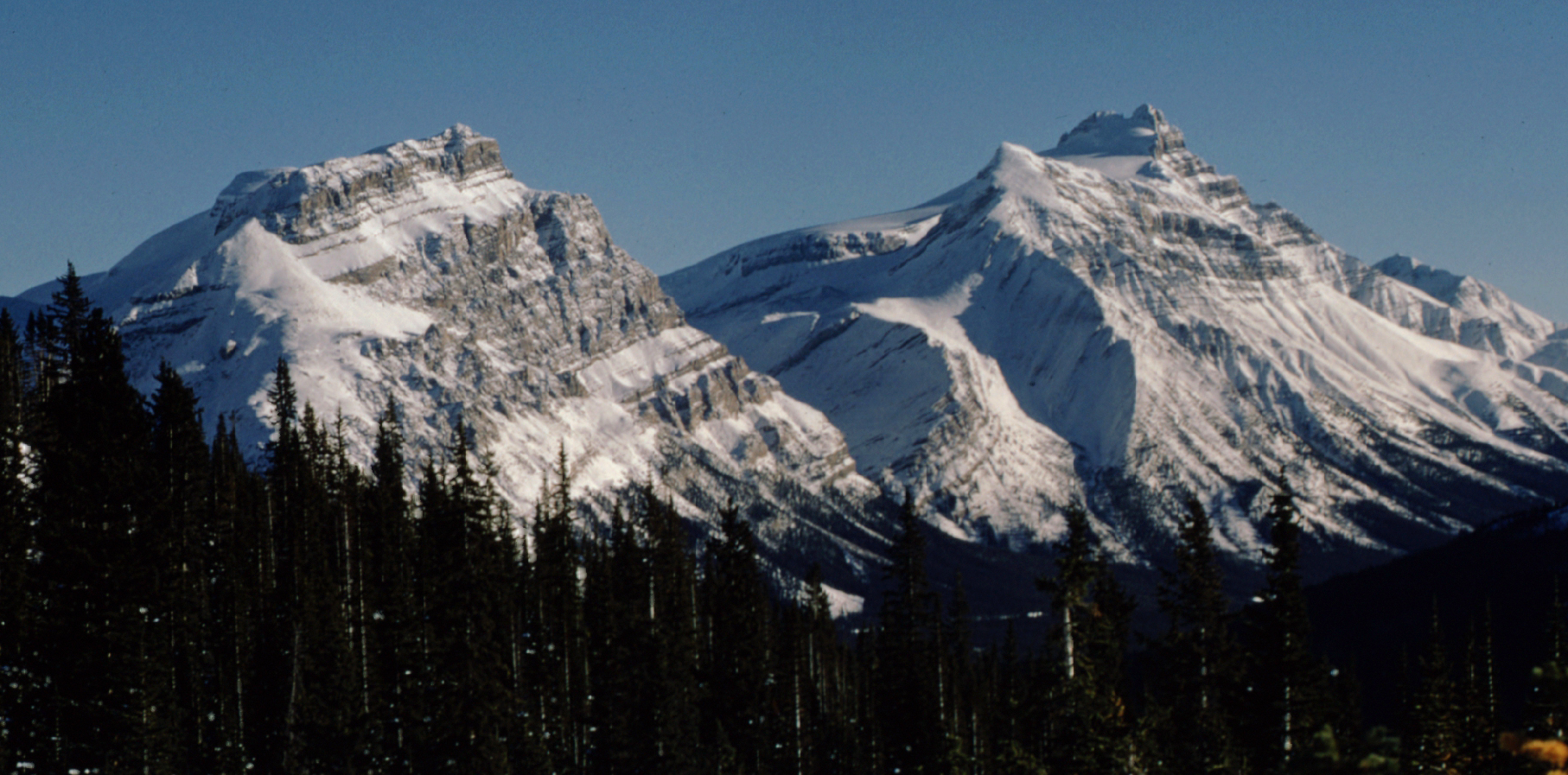
Mt. Andromache (left) and Mt. Hector

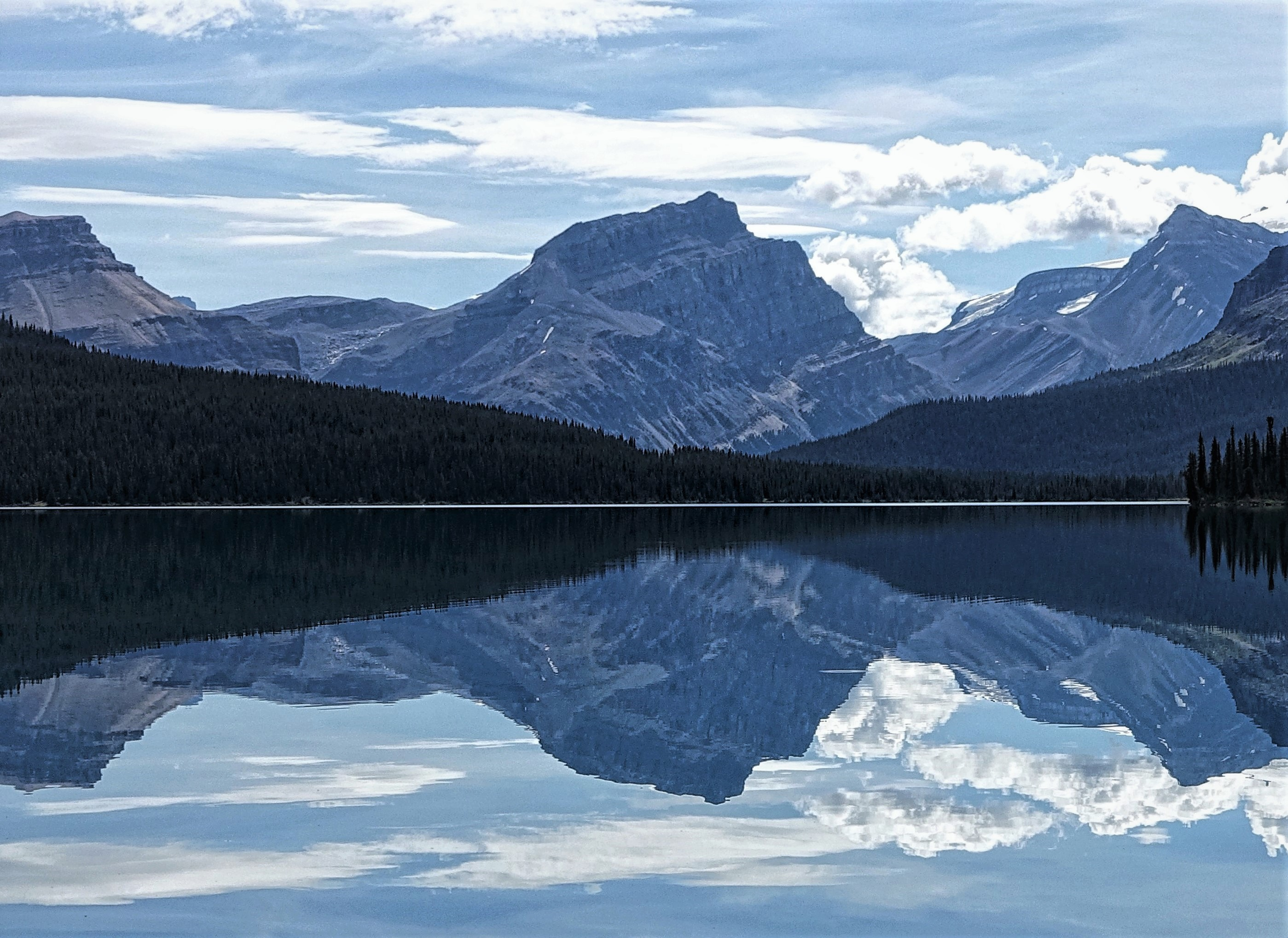
Mount Andromache reflected in Bow Lake

== See also ==
- Geology of Alberta
- Geography of Alberta
