= Odaray Mountain =

Mountain in British Columbia, Canada

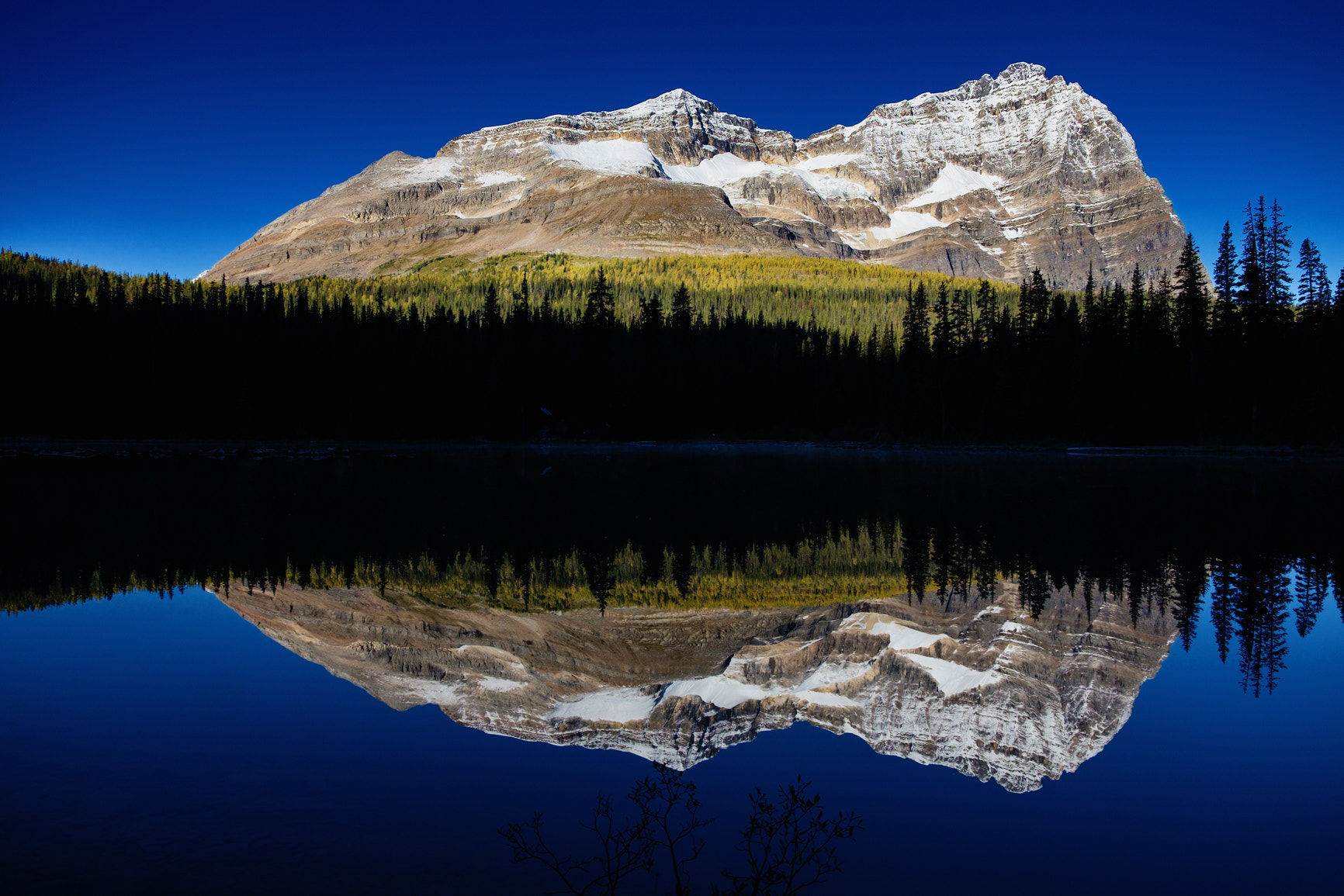
- Odaray Mountain reflected in Lake O'Hara

Highest point
- Elevation: 3,137 m (10,292 ft)
- Prominence: 627 m (2,057 ft)
- Parent peak: Mount Stephen (3,200 m)
- Listing: Mountains of British Columbia
- Coordinates: 51°21′37″N 116°23′03″W

Naming
- English translation: Many waterfalls
- Language of name: North American Indian languages

Geography
- Location within British Columbia Location within Canada
- Interactive map of Odaray Mountain
- Country: Canada
- Province: British Columbia
- District: Kootenay Land District
- Protected area: Yoho National Park
- Parent range: Bow Range; Park Ranges; Canadian Rockies
- Topo map: NTS 82N8 Lake Louise

Geology
- Rock age: Cambrian
- Rock type(s): shale, limestone

Climbing
- First ascent: 1887 by James J. McArthur (solo)
- Easiest route: Scrambling

Odaray Mountain is a 3,137-metre (10,292-foot) summit located west of Lake O'Hara in the Bow Range of Yoho National Park, in the Canadian Rockies of British Columbia, Canada. Its nearest higher peak is Mount Huber, 3.86 km (2.40 mi) to the east. The standard climbing route follows the southeast glacier and ridge starting from Elizabeth Parker hut. Pronunciation sounds like the two words "ode array" (/ōd/ /əˈrā/).

== History ==
The first ascent of the mountain was made in 1887 by James J. McArthur, and he named it Odaray which is the expression for "many waterfalls" in the Stoney language. Other reports have it being named in 1894 by Samuel Evans Stokes Allen for the Stoney Indian word for "cone". However, it is possible that McArthur only ascended the lesser secondary summit cone (2965 m) now known as Little Odaray which is southeast of the true summit. The mountain's current name became official in 1952 when the Geographical Names Board of Canada rescinded the name Mount Odaray.

== Geology ==
Odaray Mountain is composed of sedimentary rock laid down during the Precambrian to Jurassic periods. Formed in shallow seas, this sedimentary rock was pushed east and over the top of younger rock during the Laramide orogeny.

== Climate ==
Based on the Köppen climate classification, Odaray Mountain is located in a subarctic climate zone with cold, snowy winters, and mild summers. Winter temperatures can drop below −20 °C with wind chill factors below −30 °C. Precipitation runoff from Odaray Mountain drains into tributaries of the Kicking Horse River which is a tributary of the Columbia River.

== Gallery ==
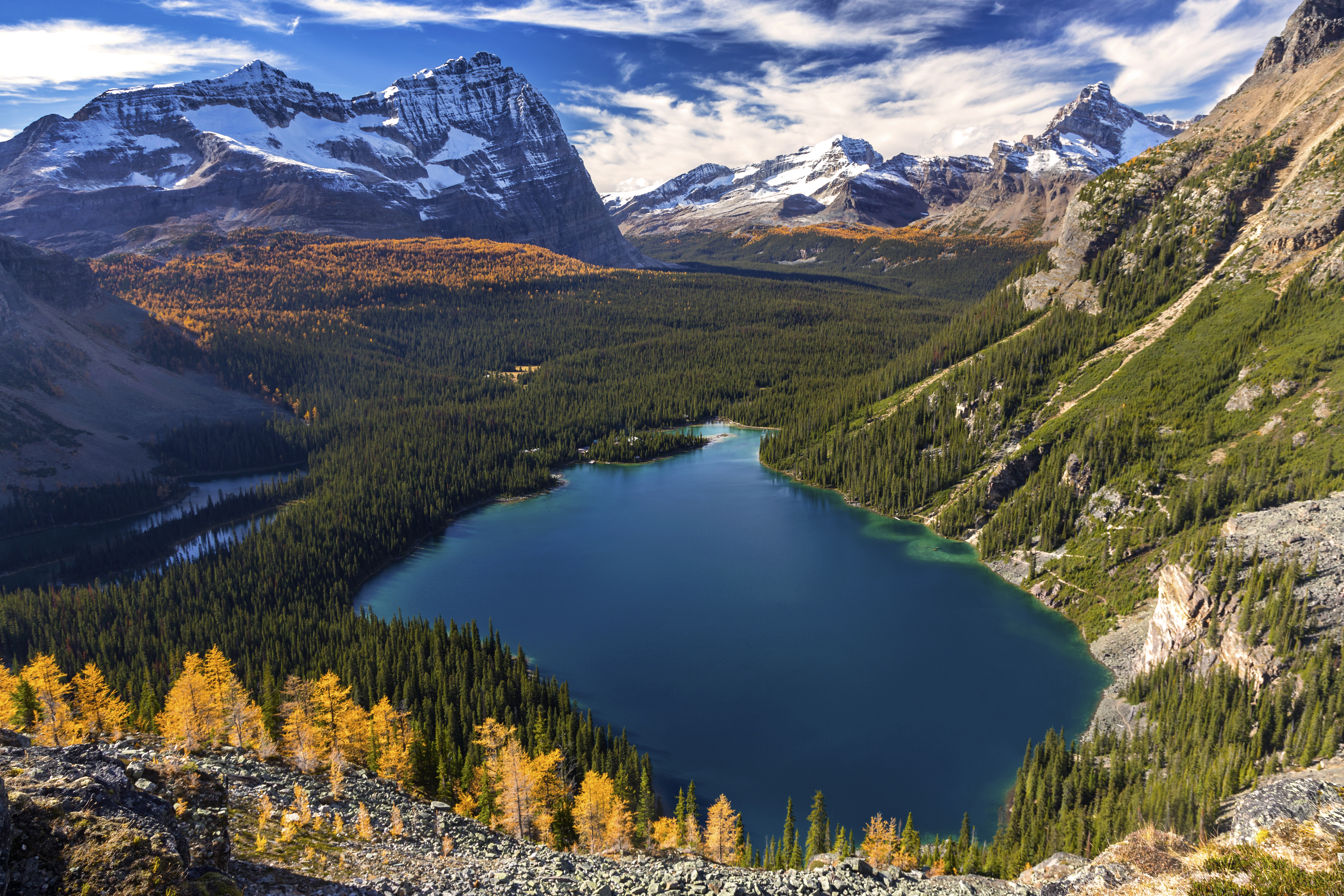
Odaray (upper left) and Lake O'Hara

== See also ==
- Geography of British Columbia
- Burgess Shale
