= Mount King (British Columbia) =

Mountain in British Columbia, Canada

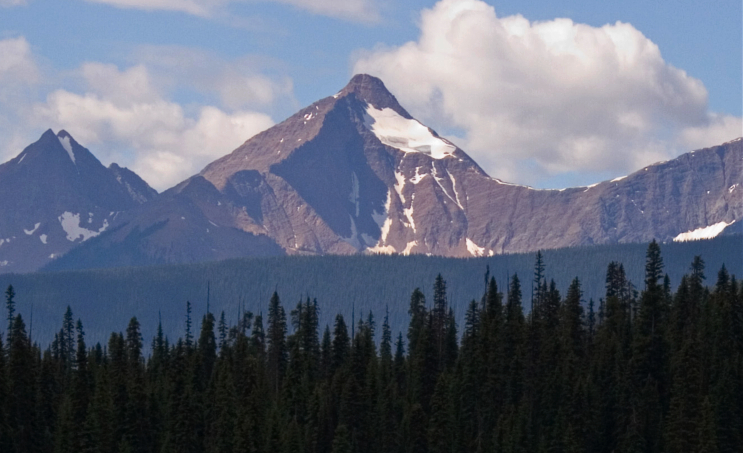
- Mount King

Highest point
- Elevation: 2,868 m (9,409 ft)
- Prominence: 468 m (1,535 ft)
- Parent peak: Mount Deville (2889 m)
- Listing: Mountains of British Columbia
- Coordinates: 51°20′26″N 116°38′55″W

Geography
- Location within British Columbia Location within Canada
- Interactive map of Mount King
- Location: British Columbia, Canada
- District: Kootenay Land District
- Parent range: Van Horne Range; Canadian Rockies
- Topo map: NTS 82N7 Golden

Geology
- Rock age: Cambrian
- Rock type: sedimentary rock

Climbing
- First ascent: 1892 James J. McArthur

Mount King is a 2,868-metre (9,409-foot) mountain summit located in Yoho National Park, in the Canadian Rockies of British Columbia, Canada. Its nearest higher peak is Mount Deville, 5.0 km (3.1 mi) to the northwest. Both are in the Van Horne Range, which has the oldest mountains in the Rockies, and as such they are highly eroded. Mount King is a landmark that can be seen from Highway 1, the Trans-Canada Highway in the Kicking Horse valley and Kicking Horse Pass areas. The mountain is situated 14 kilometres southwest of Emerald Lake, and 13 km southwest of Field, British Columbia.

== History ==
The mountain was named by Otto Koltz in 1886 for William Frederick King (1854–1916), a Canadian surveyor, astronomer, and civil servant.

The first ascent of Mount King was made in 1892 by James J. McArthur.

The mountain's name was officially adopted in 1924 when approved by the Geographical Names Board of Canada.

== Geology ==
Mount King is composed of sedimentary rock laid down during the Cambrian period. Formed in shallow seas, this sedimentary rock was pushed east and over the top of younger rock during the Laramide orogeny.

== Climate ==
Based on the Köppen climate classification, Mount King is located in a subarctic climate zone with cold, snowy winters, and mild summers. Temperatures can drop below −20 °C with wind chill factors below −30 °C. Precipitation runoff from Mount King drains into tributaries of the Kicking Horse River which is a tributary of the Columbia River.

== Gallery ==
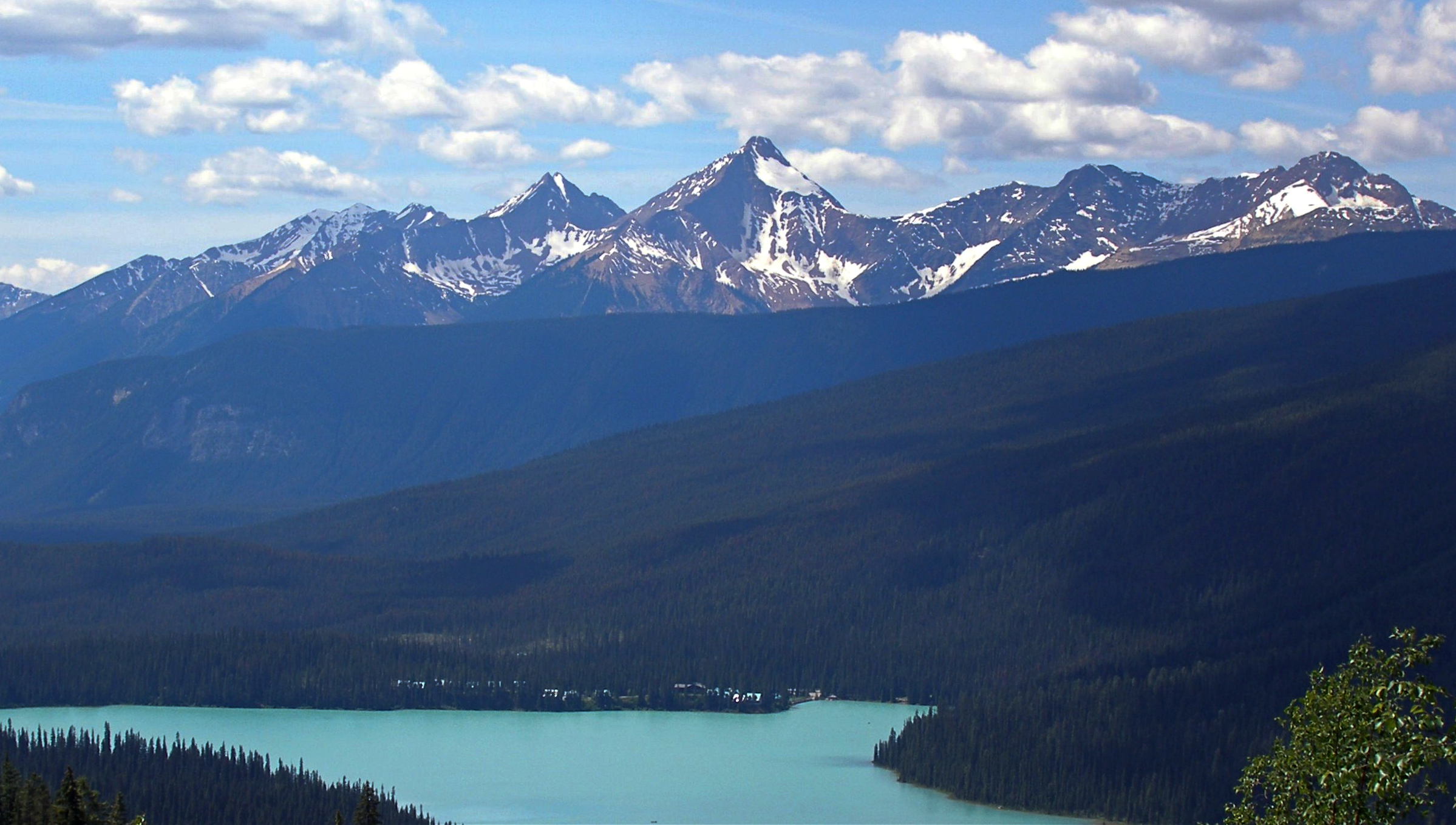
Van Horne Range beyond Emerald Lake with Mount King centered

== See also ==
- Geography of British Columbia
