= Isolated Peak =

Summit in Canada

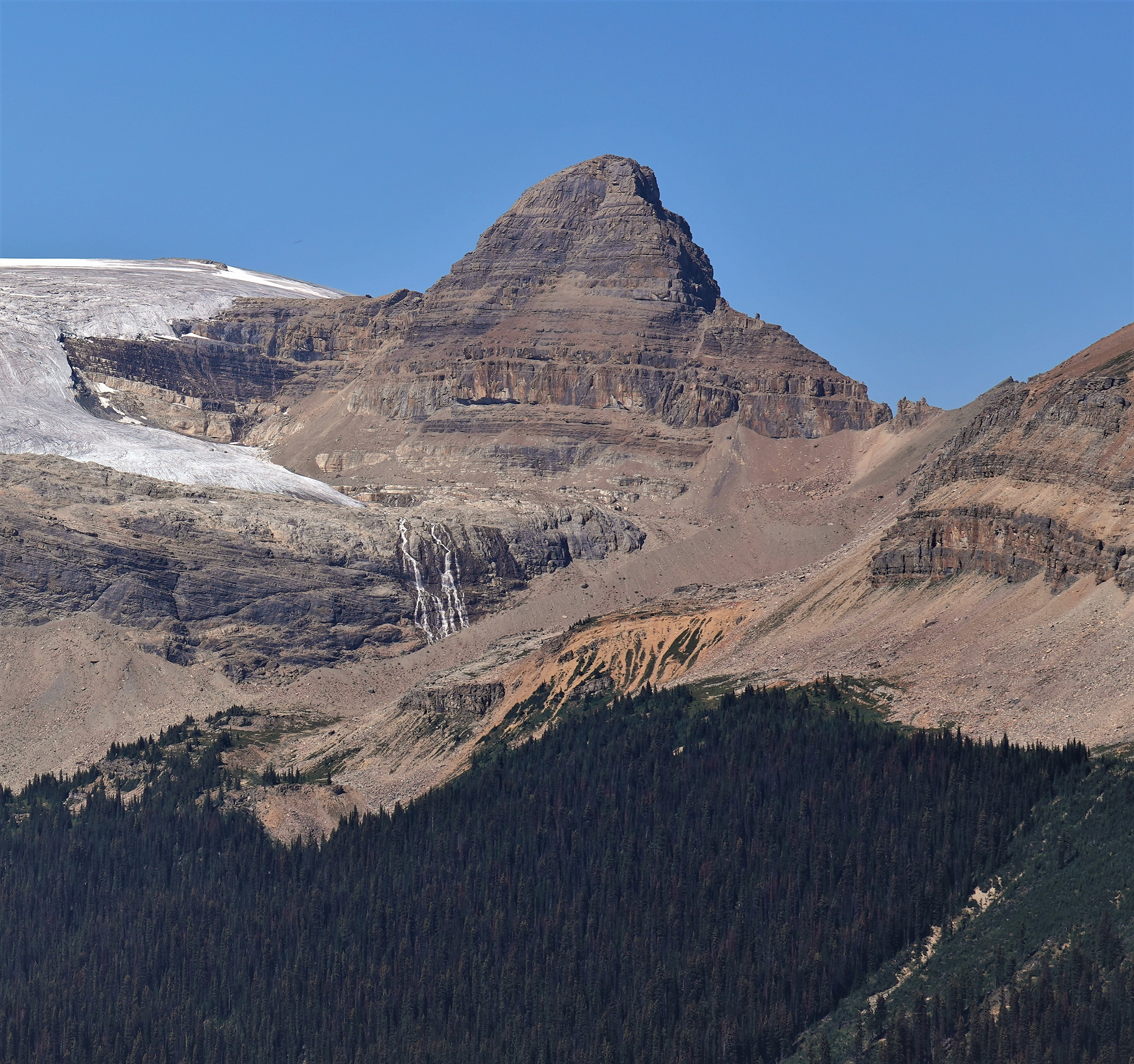
- Southeast aspect

Highest point
- Elevation: 2,845 m (9,334 ft)
- Prominence: 83 m (272 ft)
- Parent peak: Mont des Poilus (3,161 m)
- Isolation: 1.06 km (0.66 mi)
- Listing: Mountains of British Columbia
- Coordinates: 51°32′37″N 116°34′35″W

Geography
- Location within British Columbia Location within Canada
- Interactive map of Isolated Peak
- Country: Canada
- Province: British Columbia
- District: Kootenay Land District
- Protected area: Yoho National Park
- Parent range: Waputik Mountains; Canadian Rockies
- Topo map: NTS 82N10 Blaeberry River

Geology
- Rock age: Cambrian
- Rock type: Sedimentary rock

Climbing
- First ascent: 1901

Isolated Peak is a 2,845-metre (9,334-foot) summit in British Columbia, Canada.

== Description ==
Isolated Peak is located in Yoho National Park, in the Waputik Mountains of the Canadian Rockies. Precipitation runoff from Isolated Peak drains into tributaries of the Yoho River which in turn is a tributary of the Kicking Horse River. Isolated Peak is more notable for its steep rise above local terrain than for its absolute elevation as topographic relief is significant with the summit rising 700 meters (2,297 ft) above Twin Falls Creek in 1 km (0.62 mi) and 800 meters (2,625 ft) above Little Yoho River in 2.5 km (1.6 mi). The peak is visible from Highway 1 (the Trans-Canada Highway). The nearest higher neighbor is Mount McArthur, 1.46 km (0.91 mi) to the west.

== History ==
The first ascent of the mountain was made in 1901 by Edward Whymper and James Outram with guides Christian Kaufmann, Christian Klucker, Joseph Pollinger, and Joseph Bossoney. At that time the peak was an isolated nunatak in the middle of a glacier and Whymper, who named the peak, also called the peak "Insular" in addition to Isolated. The mountain's toponym was officially adopted on March 31, 1924, by the Geographical Names Board of Canada.

== Geology ==
Isolated Peak is composed of sedimentary rock laid down during the Precambrian to Jurassic periods. Formed in shallow seas, this sedimentary rock was pushed east and over the top of younger rock during the Laramide orogeny.

== Climate ==
Based on the Köppen climate classification, Isolated Peak is located in a subarctic climate zone with cold, snowy winters, and mild summers. Winter temperatures can drop below −20 °C with wind chill factors below −30 °C. This climate supports the McArthur Glacier on the west slope of the peak and Glacier des Poilus to the north.

== Gallery ==
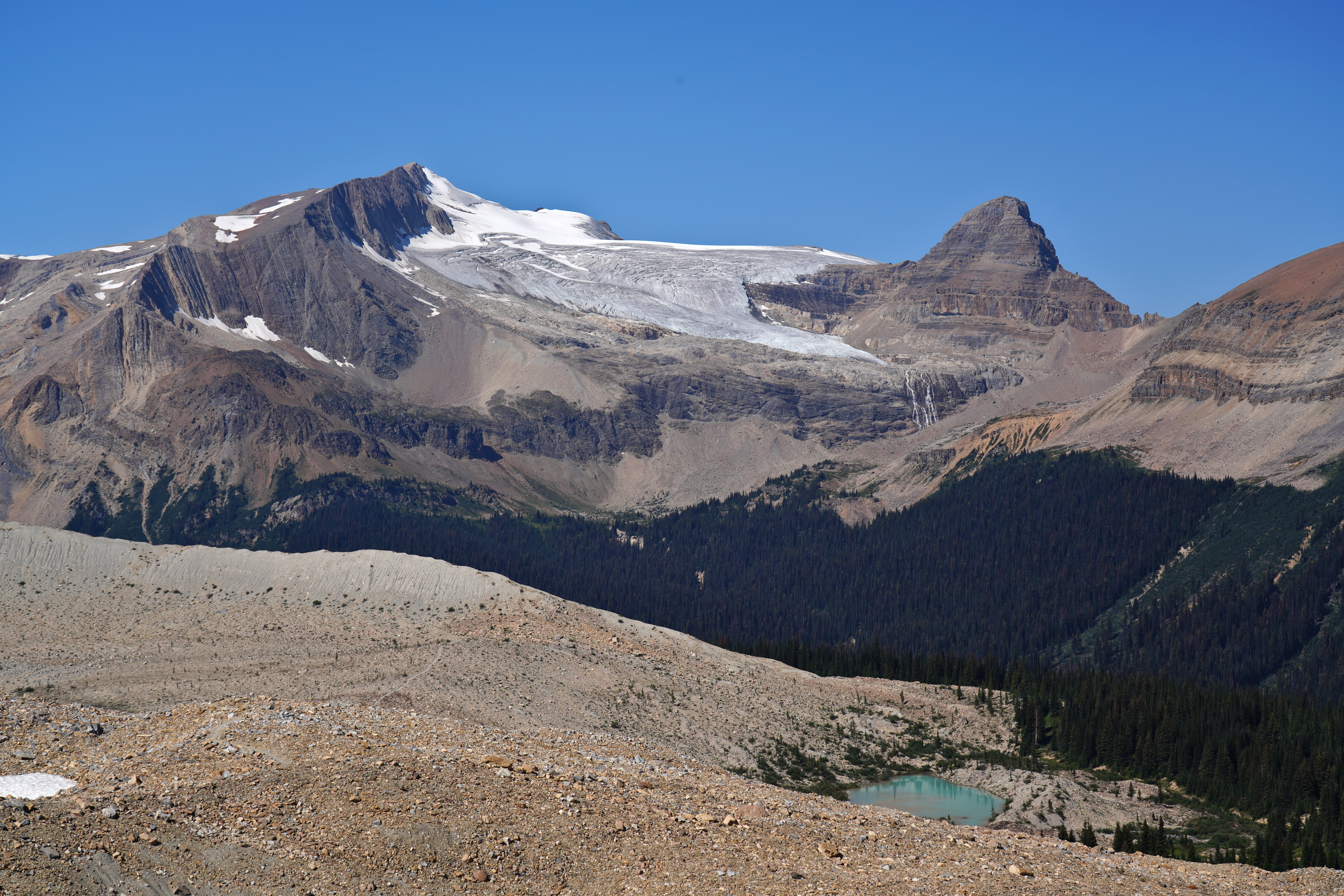
Mt. McArthur, McArthur Glacier, and Isolated Peak (right)

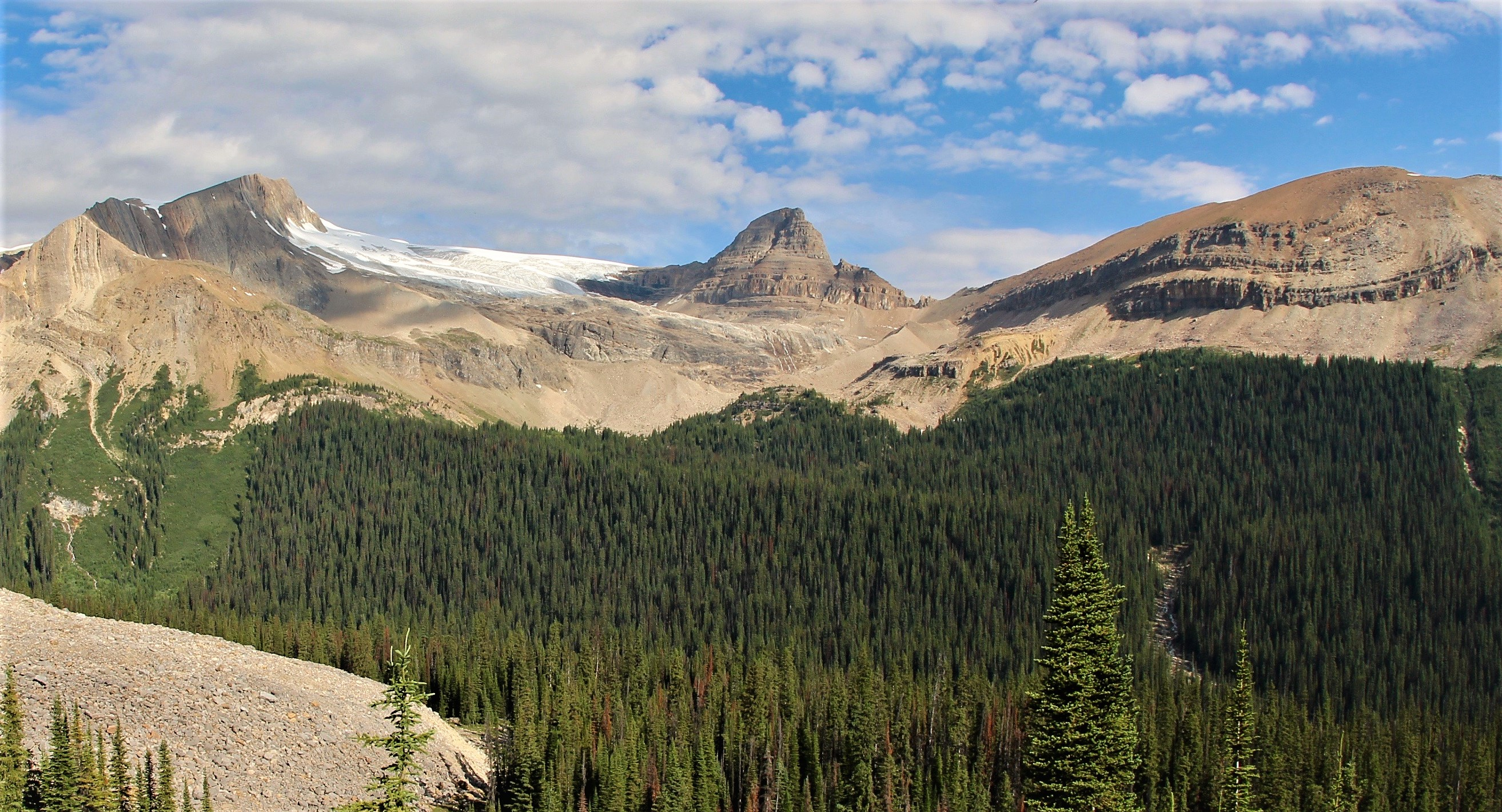
Mt. McArthur (left), Isolated Peak (center), Whaleback Mountain (right)

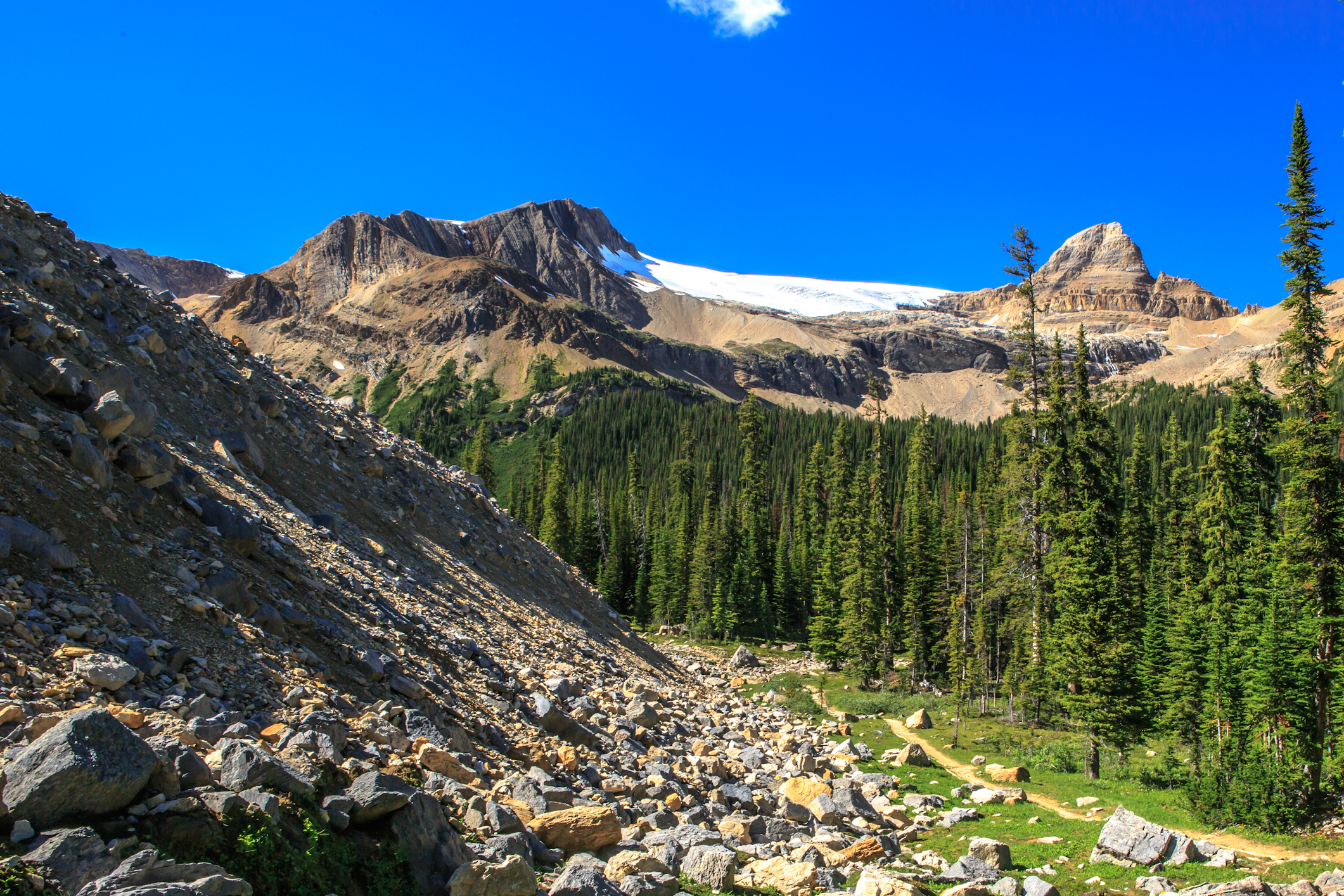
Mt. McArthur (left of center) and Isolated Peak (right)

== See also ==
- Geography of British Columbia
