= Mount McArthur (British Columbia) =

Mountain located in Yoho National Park, British Columbia, Canada

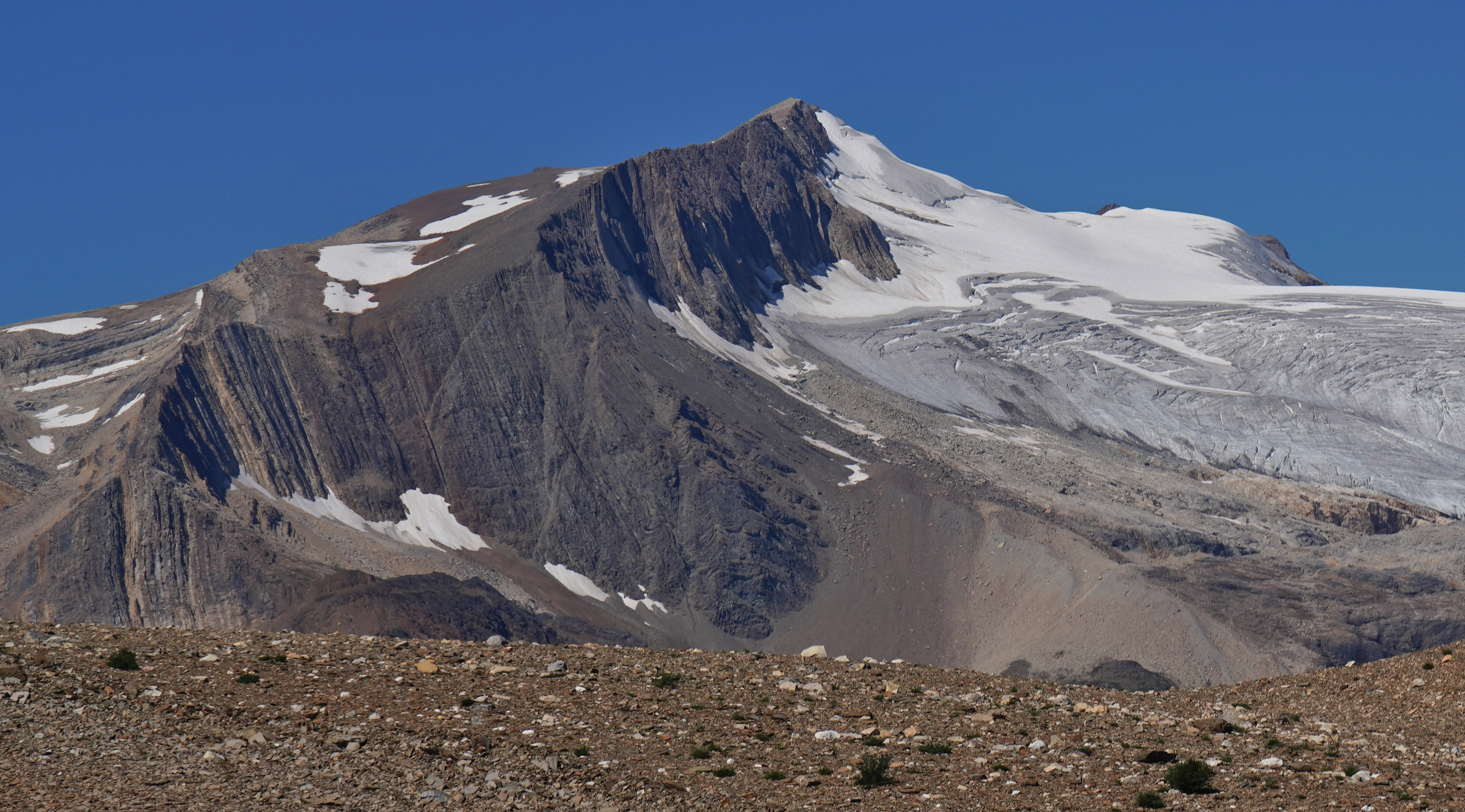
- Southeast aspect

Highest point
- Elevation: 3,021 m (9,911 ft)
- Prominence: 221 m (725 ft)
- Isolation: 4.94 km (3.07 mi)
- Listing: Mountains of British Columbia
- Coordinates: 51°32′26″N 116°35′49″W

Geography
- Location within British Columbia Location within Canada
- Interactive map of
- Country: Canada
- Province: British Columbia
- District: Kootenay Land District
- Protected area: Yoho National Park
- Parent range: Waputik Mountains; Canadian Rockies
- Topo map: NTS 82N10 Blaeberry River

Climbing
- First ascent: 1891 by W.S. Drewry, Dominion Topographic Survey

Mount McArthur is a mountain located in Yoho National Park, British Columbia, Canada. It was named in 1886 by Otto Koltz after James J. McArthur, a land surveyor who mapped the Canadian Rockies for the Canadian Pacific Railway.

== Climate ==
Based on the Köppen climate classification, this mountain is located in a subarctic climate zone with cold, snowy winters, and mild summers. Winter temperatures can drop below −20 °C with wind chill factors below −30 °C.

== Geology ==
The peak is composed of sedimentary rock laid down during the Precambrian to Jurassic periods. Formed in shallow seas, this sedimentary rock was pushed east and over the top of younger rock during the Laramide orogeny.

== Gallery ==
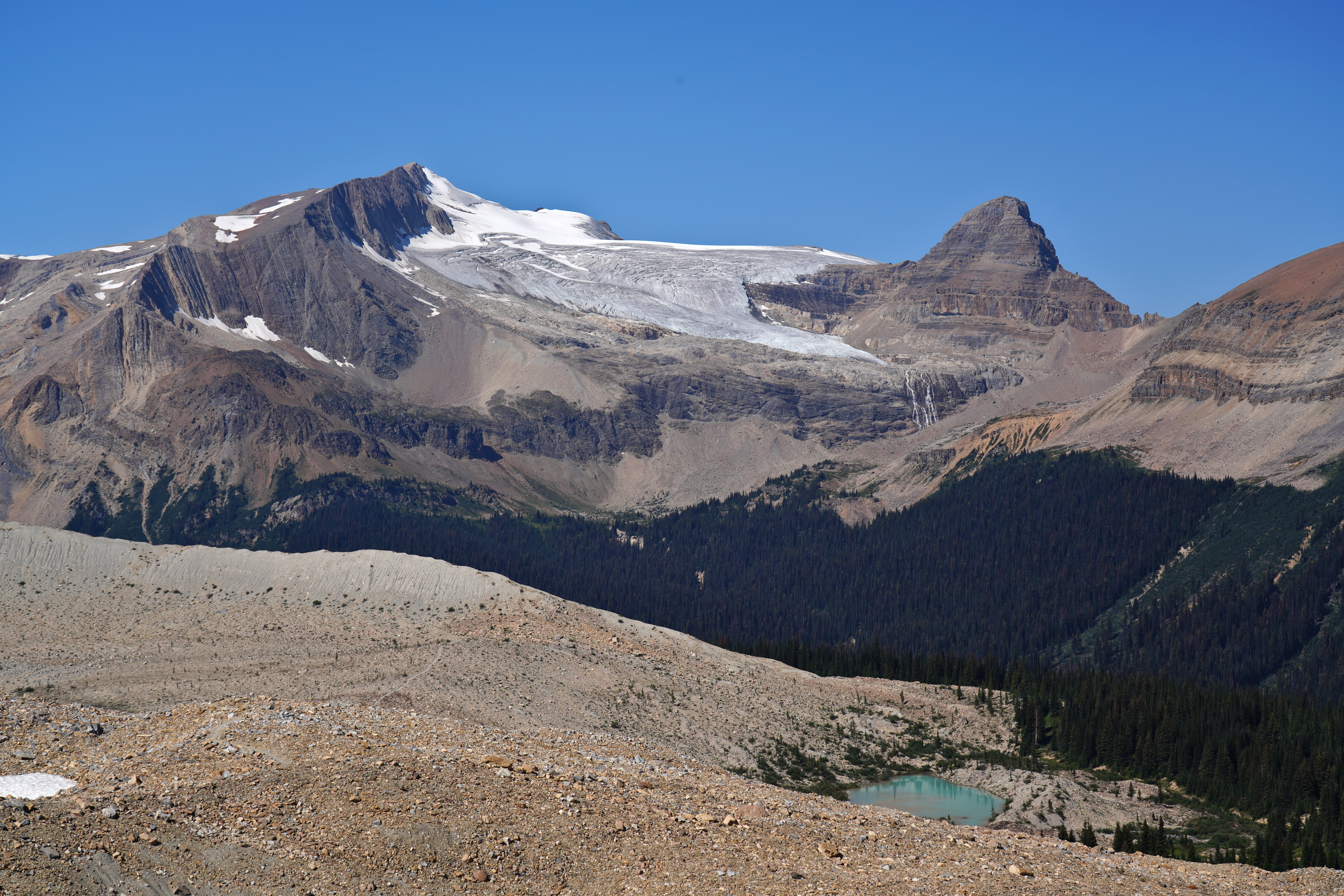
Mount McArthur (left), McArthur Glacier and Isolated Peak (right)

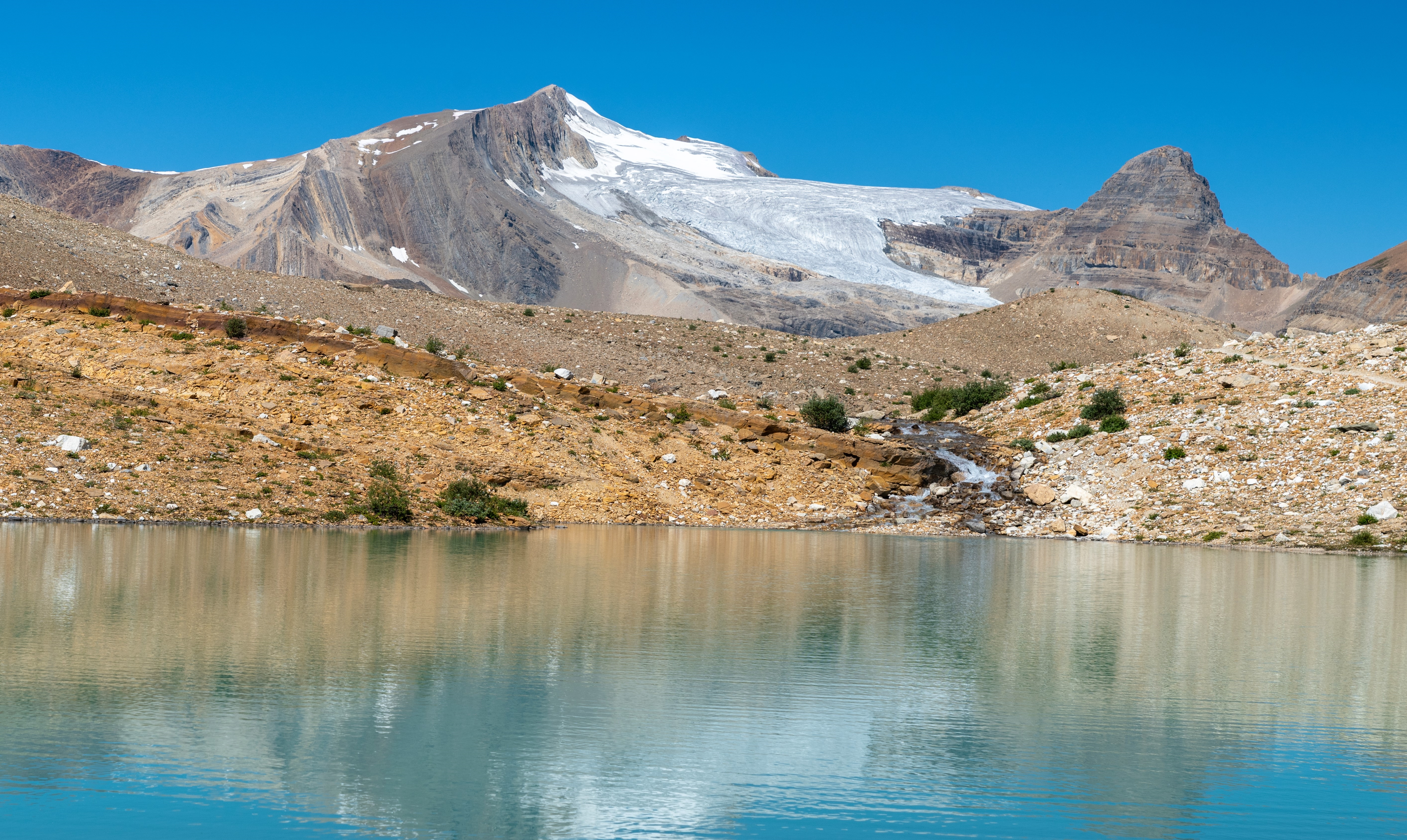

== See also ==
- Geology of British Columbia
