= James J. McArthur =

Canadian surveyor and mountaineer

James Joseph McArthur
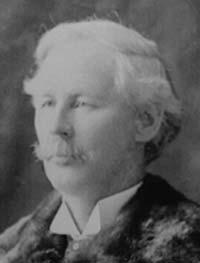
- Born: 9 May 1856; Aylmer, Canada East
- Died: 14 April 1925 (aged 68); Gatineau, Quebec, Canada
- Occupation: Surveyor

James Joseph McArthur (9 May 1856 – 14 April 1925) was a Canadian surveyor and mountaineer who was the first to climb several peaks in the Canadian Rocky Mountains. Two mountains and a lake are named after him, and he gave names to various other features. He was a pioneer in the use of photography for surveying, under the direction of the Surveyor General, Édouard-Gaston Deville. He did extensive work on surveying the borders between Canada and the United States in the Yukon and west of Lake Superior.

== Early years (1856–1886) ==
James Joseph McArthur was born on 9 May 1856 in Aylmer, Canada East. He became a surveyor for the Dominion Land Survey.

== Canadian Pacific Railway (1886–1893) ==
McArthur was assisted by the surveyors William Stuart Drewry and Arthur St. Cyr in the Canadian Pacific Railway (CPR) survey between 1886 and 1893, in which he mapped an area of 500 square kilometres (190 sq mi) at a scale of 1:20,000, with 100 feet (30 m) contours. The survey mapped the terrain along the CPR route between Canmore, Alberta, and Revelstoke, British Columbia. He travelled with an assistant, T. Riley, who helped carry the heavy surveying and photographic equipment.

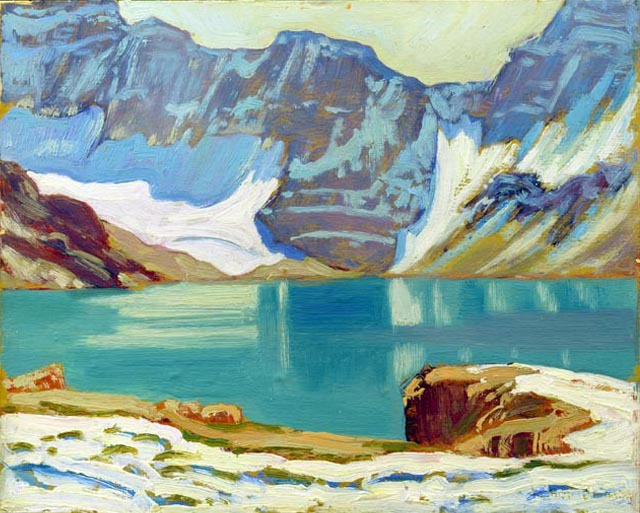
Lake McArthur by J. E. H. MacDonald (1924)

In 1886 McArthur ascended Paget Peak. That year Otto Julius Koltz named the 3,021 metres (9,911 ft) Mount McArthur after him. McArthur was the first European to describe Lake McArthur and Lake O'Hara. He found the two lakes in 1887. Towards the end of autumn in 1887 McArthur, his assistant and a packer camped for four days in the Bow Valley during a blizzard, then set out to climb the surrounding peaks. He wrote,

I occupied three stations, one on a high point on the ridge leading up the pass from Mount Hector, another on the mountain overlooking the first Bow Lake, and the third on the west side and further up the pass. The great quantity of snow rendered these ascents very disagreeable and dangerous, the loose debris being almost entirely covered and rendering it necessary to feel every step without alpenstalks, whilst the descent of fresh snow, when cutting our way up the steep parts of the glaciers, rendered our position sometimes very precarious. When on the summits we suffered greatly from cold. Climbing through the fresh snow, sometimes waist deep, wet our feet and legs above the knees, and on reaching the top and exposed to the cold wind, our boots and pants froze stiff and we were sometimes in great danger of freezing.

In 1888 the Surveyor General, Édouard-Gaston Deville, decided to try photo-topographic surveying, working from triangulation stations on the peaks of mountains. He hoped this would be faster, cheaper and more accurate than sketching. McArthur went out with a camera that summer. There were problems with exposure at first, but by 15 November 1888 McArthur had made use of 30 camera stations to make 23 triangulations that covered the railway belt 6 miles (9.7 km) to each side of the railway line from Vermilion Pass to Banff, Alberta, and covered the whole Rocky Mountains Park. The negatives were sent to be developed by Horatio Nelson Topley's Photographic Division in Ottawa, and the prints returned to McArthur, where he calculated topographical details between the triangulation stations using the principles of perspective.

The next year McArthur continued the triangulation work and surveyed from the edge of the Rocky Mountains Park along the Bow River to eight miles east of the Kananaskis River. McArthur made 15 triangulations, ascended 25 mountains and took 250 photographic views in 1889. In 1890 he surveyed from Simpson Pass to Vermilion River. In 1891 the surveyor William Stewart Drewry joined McArthur and the two began to survey using a double chain of triangles, a more efficient approach. In 1892 they worked west to Field, British Columbia, having surveyed 2,000 square miles (5,200 km^{2}). McArthur and Drewry were able to draw topographical maps from the photographs showing mountain elevations, although they could not add contour lines.

While surveying the CPR route McArthur was the first European to climb Mount Stephen (9 September 1887 with T. Riley), Mount Field and Mount Andromache (1887 with T. Riley), Mount Odaray (1887), Mount Rundle (1888), Mount Aylmer (1889), Mount Bourgeau (1890), Mount King (1892), Mount Owen (1892) and Mount Burgess (1892 with Henrietta Tuzo (Note: In 1907 Henrietta Tuzo and Christian Kaufmann were first to climb Mount Tuzo in Alberta. Her son, John Tuzo Wilson, was a geologist who made important contributions to the theory of plate tectonics.)). In 1891 alone McArthur climbed 43 peaks. McArthur named Mount Aberdeen, End Mountain, Victoria Peak and Mount Victoria.

== Later career (1893–1925) ==
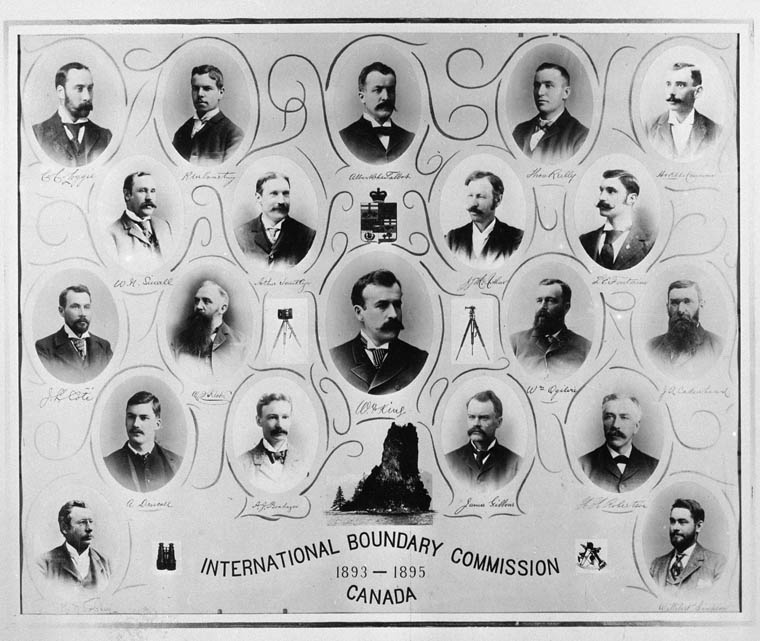
International Boundary Commission 1893 - 1895 Canada. McArthur is in the second row from the top, third from the left.

McArthur undertook extensive surveying in the Yukon. McArthur Peak in the Yukon is named after him. In 1900 he named the 4,842 metres (15,886 ft) Mount Wood in the Yukon after Zachary Taylor Wood, a North-West Mounted Police inspector in Dawson City during the Klondike Gold Rush.

From 1908 to 1916 McArthur worked on the survey of the border between Canada and the United States between the Rocky Mountains and Lake Superior. On 11 September 1908 McArthur and his party made the first ascent of Mount Larrabee. In 1917 he was named Canadian Commissioner for the survey of the border between the Yukon and Alaska. McArthur died on 14 April 1925 in Ottawa. Arthur Oliver Wheeler wrote of him,

He is a quiet, unassuming man, who has probably climbed more mountains in these regions than any other person, and has made a large number of first ascents. No flourish of trumpets ushered him forth to conquest, no crown of laurels awaited his victory; a corps of trained Swiss guides was not at hand to place his footsteps, to check his down-slidings, and select for him the surest road. With one assistant, transit, and camera on back, many a perilous climb has been made, the rope only being used in the case of most urgent need. In all kinds of weather, through snow, over ice, and in pouring rain, many a difficult ascent has been accomplished, many privations encountered and much hardship endured; the only record being a few terse paragraphs in the Departmental Bluebook...

James McArthur's home in the Aylmer sector of the city of Gatineau is designated a heritage building. It is a 1 1/2-story rectangular wooden house on a large wooded lot built in 1850. It has a straight gable roof and a large gabled dormer window. The exterior shell is protected.

== Publications ==
- Jacob Smith; James J. McArthur; Geo. A. Stewart; Arthur Saint Cyr (1890), The Rocky Mountains Park of Canada (map), Ottawa: Canada. Department of the Interior
- William Ogilvie; James J. McArthur; James Gibbon; A. St. Cyr; C.W. Hayes (1898), Yukon map (Map on 10 sheets), Ottawa: Surveyor-General's Office, Department of the Interior
- James J. McArthur (1898), Map of exploratory survey of the Stewart River in the Yukon Territory
- James J. McArthur (1901), Chilkoot & White Passes
- James J. McArthur (1900–1918), Joint report upon the survey and demarcation of the international boundary between the United States and Canada along the 141st meridian from the Arctic Ocean to Mount St. Elias in accordance with the provision of Article IV of the convention signed at Washington April 21, 1906 by International Boundary Commission (1–7 ed.)
- James J. McArthur (1918), Joint maps of the international boundary between United States and Canada along the 141st meridian from the Arctic Ocean to Mt. St. Elias (38 sheets) : surveyed and monumented 1907-1913 under the convention signed at Washington April 21st, 1906 by International Boundary Commission
- James J. McArthur (1918), Joint maps of the international boundary between United States and Canada along the 141st. meridian from the Arctic Ocean to Mt. St. Elias (38 sheets) : surveyed and monumented 1907-1913 under the convention signed at Washington April 21st. 1906 by International Boundary Commission
- James J. McArthur (1921), Joint report upon the survey and demarcation of the boundary between the United States and Canada from the western terminus of the land boundary along the forty-ninth parallel, on the west side of Point Roberts, through Georgia, Haro, and Juan de Fuca Straits, to the Pacific Ocean : in accordance with the provisions of Article VIII of the treaty signed at Washington, April 11, 1908 by International Boundary Commission
- James J. McArthur, International boundary from the Gulf of Georgia to the northwesternmost point of the Lake of the Woods, International Boundary Commission

== Sources ==
- Akrigg, G.P. (Philip) V.; Akrigg, Helen (2011-11-01), British Columbia Place Names (Third ed.), UBC Press, ISBN 978-0-7748-4170-2
- Beckey, Fred W. (2008), Cascade Alpine Guide, Vol. 3, Rainy Pass to Fraser River (3rd ed.), Mountaineers Books, ISBN 978-1-59485-136-0
- James J. McArthur, ALSA: Alberta Land Surveyors' Association, 2014
- "James J. McArthur". cdnrockiesdatabases.ca.
- "James Joseph McArthur", Summit Search
- Larmour, Judy (2005), Laying Down the Lines: A History of Land Surveying in Alberta, Brindle and Glass, ISBN 978-1-897142-04-2
- MacLaren, I.S. (2005-12-01), Mapper of Mountains: M.P. Bridgland in the Canadian Rockies, 1902-1930, University of Alberta, ISBN 978-0-88864-764-1
- Maison James-McArthur (in French), Gouvernement du Québec, 2013
- Miksha, Ron (26 November 2014), "Tuzo", The Mountain Mystery
- "Mount McArthur", Bivouac.com
- "Mount Wood", SummitPost
- Scott, Chic (2000), Pushing the Limits: The Story of Canadian Mountaineering, Rocky Mountain Books Ltd, ISBN 978-0-921102-59-5
- Townsley, Frank (2016-03-10), British Columbia: Graced by Nature's Palette, FriesenPress, ISBN 978-1-4602-7773-7
