= Mount Stephen =

Mountain in British Columbia, Canada

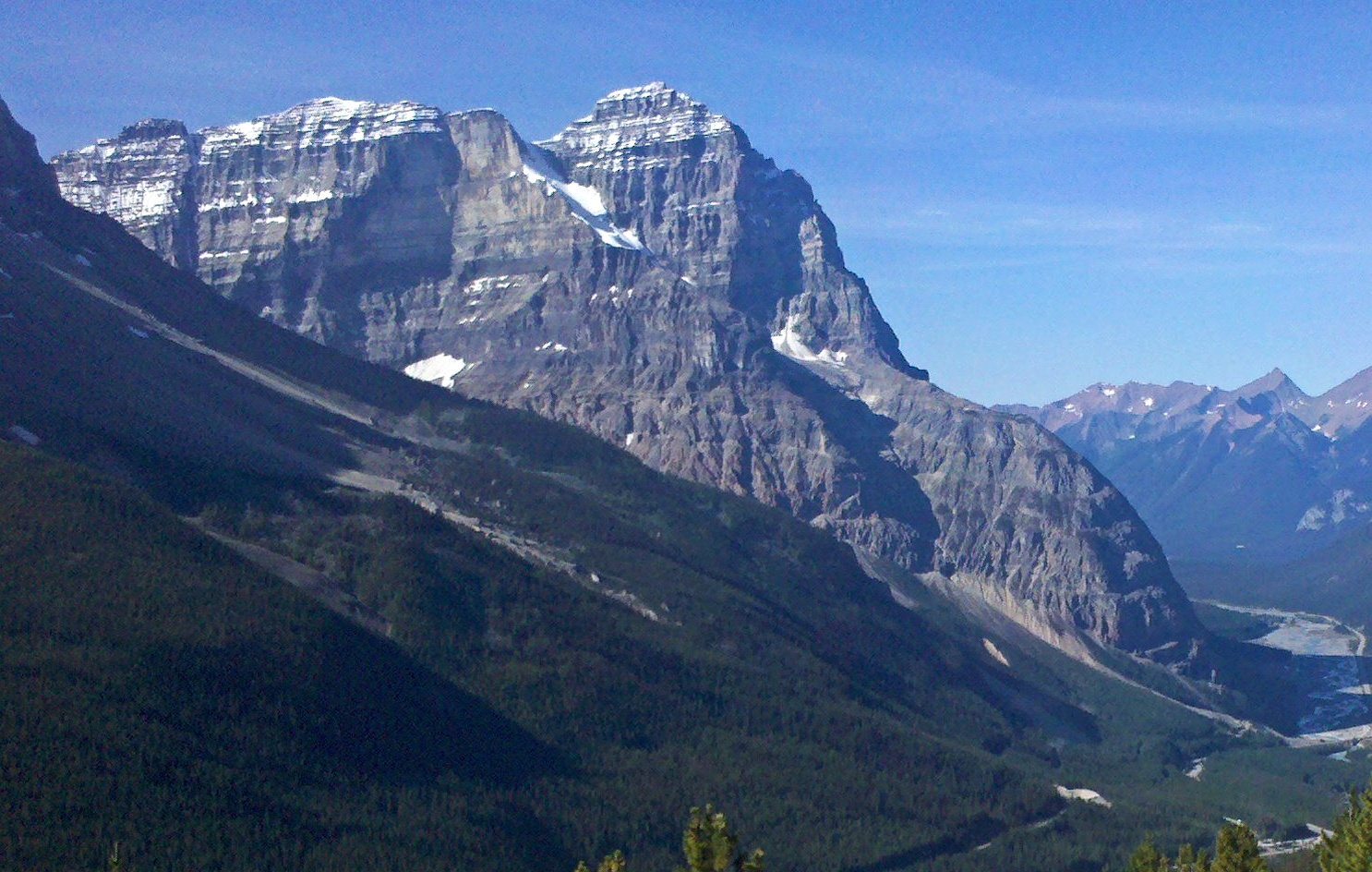
- Mount Stephen towers over the Kicking Horse Valley

Highest point
- Elevation: 3,199 m (10,495 ft)
- Prominence: 989 m (3,245 ft)
- Listing: Mountains of British Columbia
- Coordinates: 51°23′57″N 116°26′11″W

Geography
- Location within British Columbia Location within Canada
- Interactive map of Mount Stephen
- Location: British Columbia, Canada
- District: Kootenay Land District
- Parent range: Park Ranges ← Canadian Rockies
- Topo map: NTS 82N8 Lake Louise

Geology
- Rock age: Cambrian
- Rock type: Sedimentary rock

Climbing
- First ascent: 1887 by James J. McArthur, T. Riley
- Easiest route: Scramble (difficult)

Mount Stephen, 3,199 m (10,495 ft), is a mountain located in the Kicking Horse River Valley of Yoho National Park, 1/2 km east of Field, British Columbia, Canada. The mountain was named in 1886 for George Stephen, the first president of the Canadian Pacific Railway. The mountain is mainly composed of shales and dolomites from the Cambrian Period, some 550 million years ago. The Stephen Formation, a stratigraphical unit of the Western Canadian Sedimentary Basin was first described at the mountain and was named for it. Stephen has a subpeak known as Stephen SE1, at the end of a 1 km ridge, 132° from the main peak, visible from Lake O'Hara.

== Climbing ==
The first ascent was made on September 9, 1887 by James. J. McArthur and his assistant T. Riley, which was made even more difficult by the surveying equipment they also carried with them. Unfortunately for them, smoke from forest fires limited visibility from the top. Beginning at 4:30 am, it took them four hours to pierce dense forest to reach tree line. After another three hours, the final rocks were reached which bore the inscription "Hill, Whatley, Ross, September 6, 1886". Above the rocks, they had to navigate an ice couloir and a knife-edged arete before reaching the summit. Sometime between this ascent and one in 1892, an estimated 200,000 cubic feet (5,700 m^{3}) of rock had fallen in the upper section of the mountain, making the climb notably easier.

The main route (a scramble) ascends slopes on the southwest face but requires much route finding and the final section of 125 m (410 ft) to the top is rated difficult. A cornice on the summit may prevent parties from reaching the top so if in doubt of conditions, attempts should wait until August. The route also passes through a fossil bed and thus requires a special park permit to be in the area. The elevation gain is 1,920 m (6,299 ft).

For rock climbers, a route on the north ridge is rated III 5.7 with generally good rock formations composed mainly of quartzite.

== Climate ==
Based on the Köppen climate classification, Mount Stephen is located in a subarctic climate zone with cold, snowy winters, and mild summers. Temperatures can drop below -20 °C with wind chill factors below -30 °C. Weather conditions during winter make Mount Stephen one of the better places in the Rockies for ice climbing. Precipitation runoff from Mount Stephen drains into the Kicking Horse River.

== Gallery ==
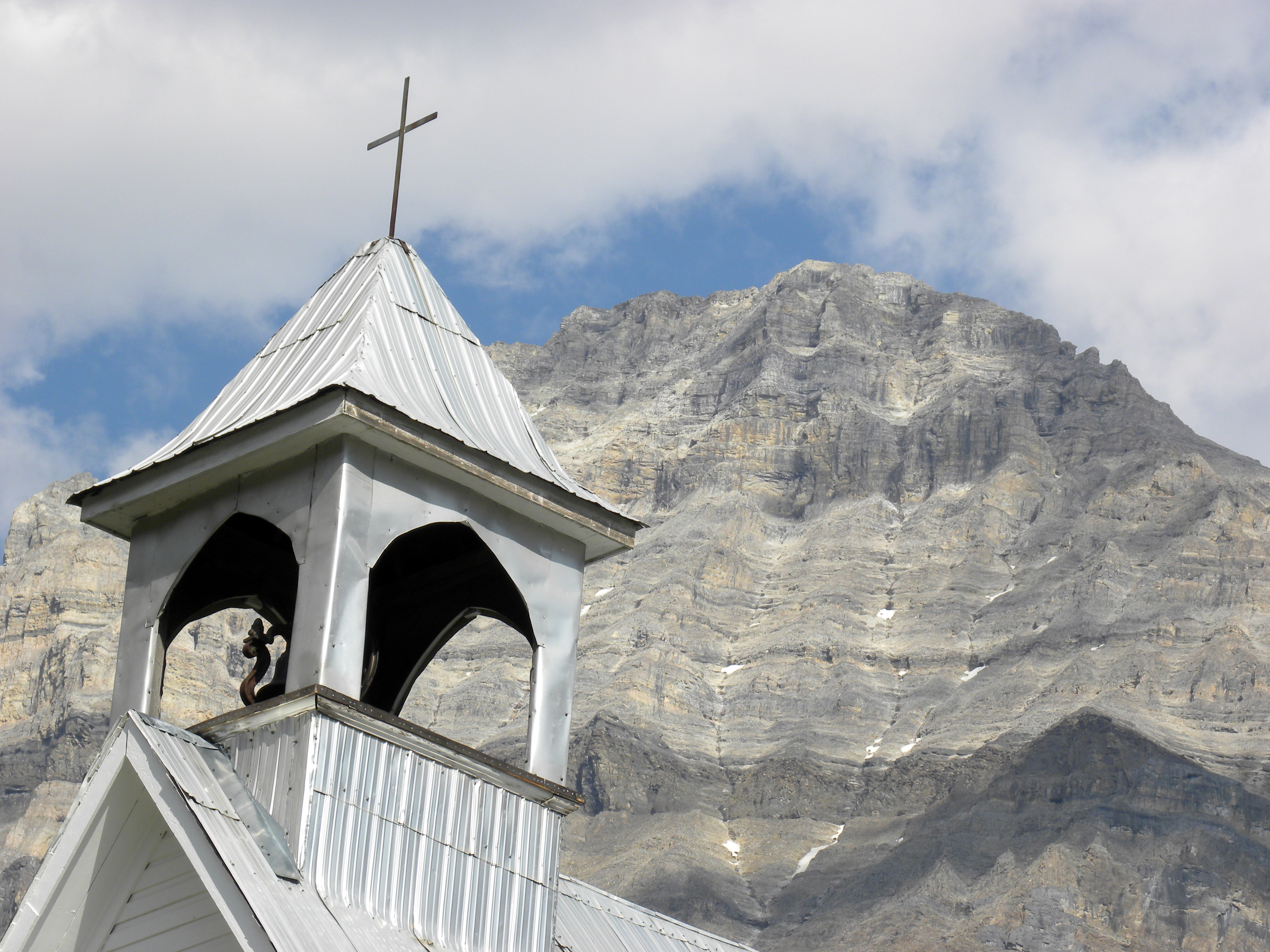
Mount Stephen as seen from Field, British Columbia, Canada

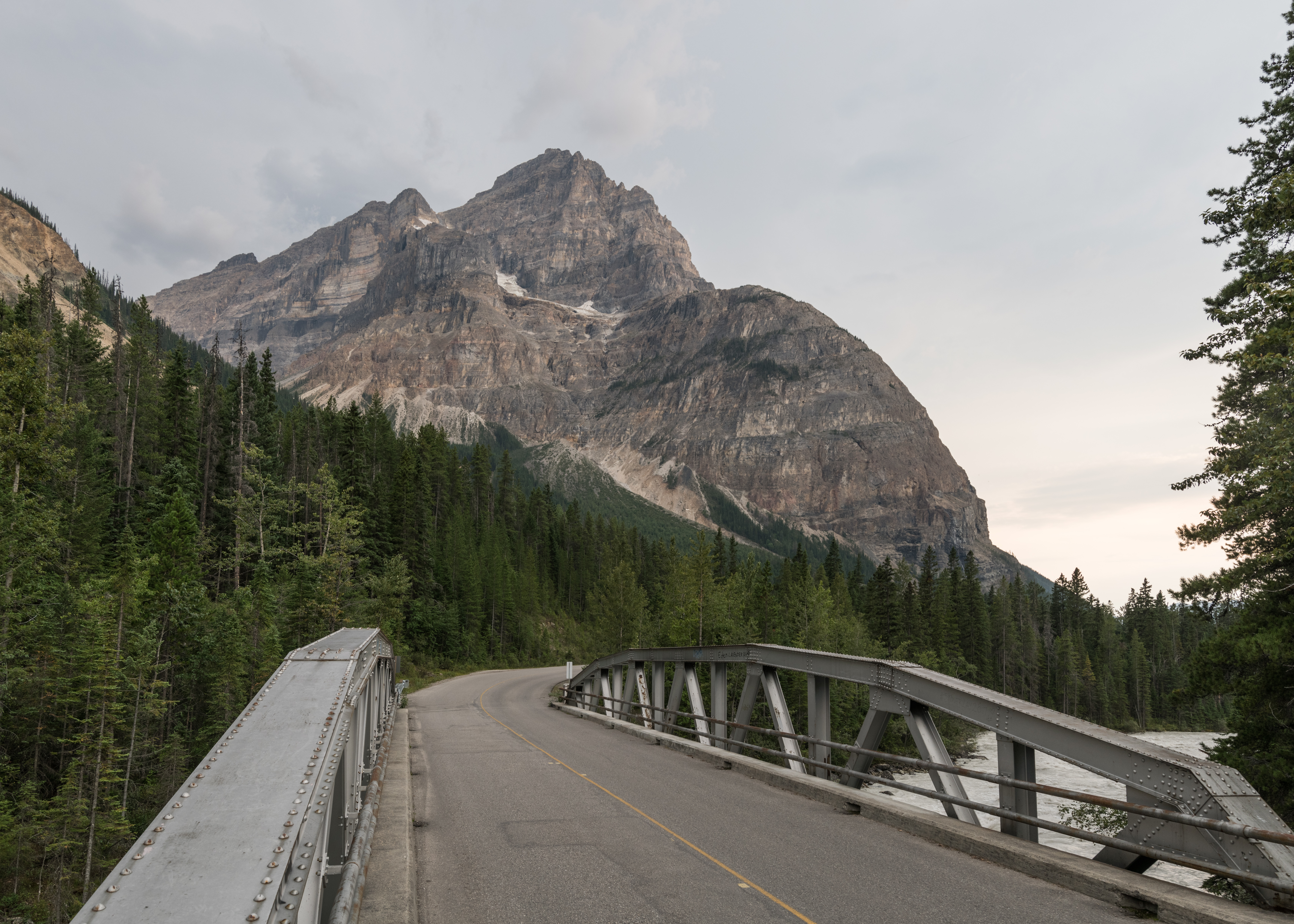
View from Yoho Valley Road

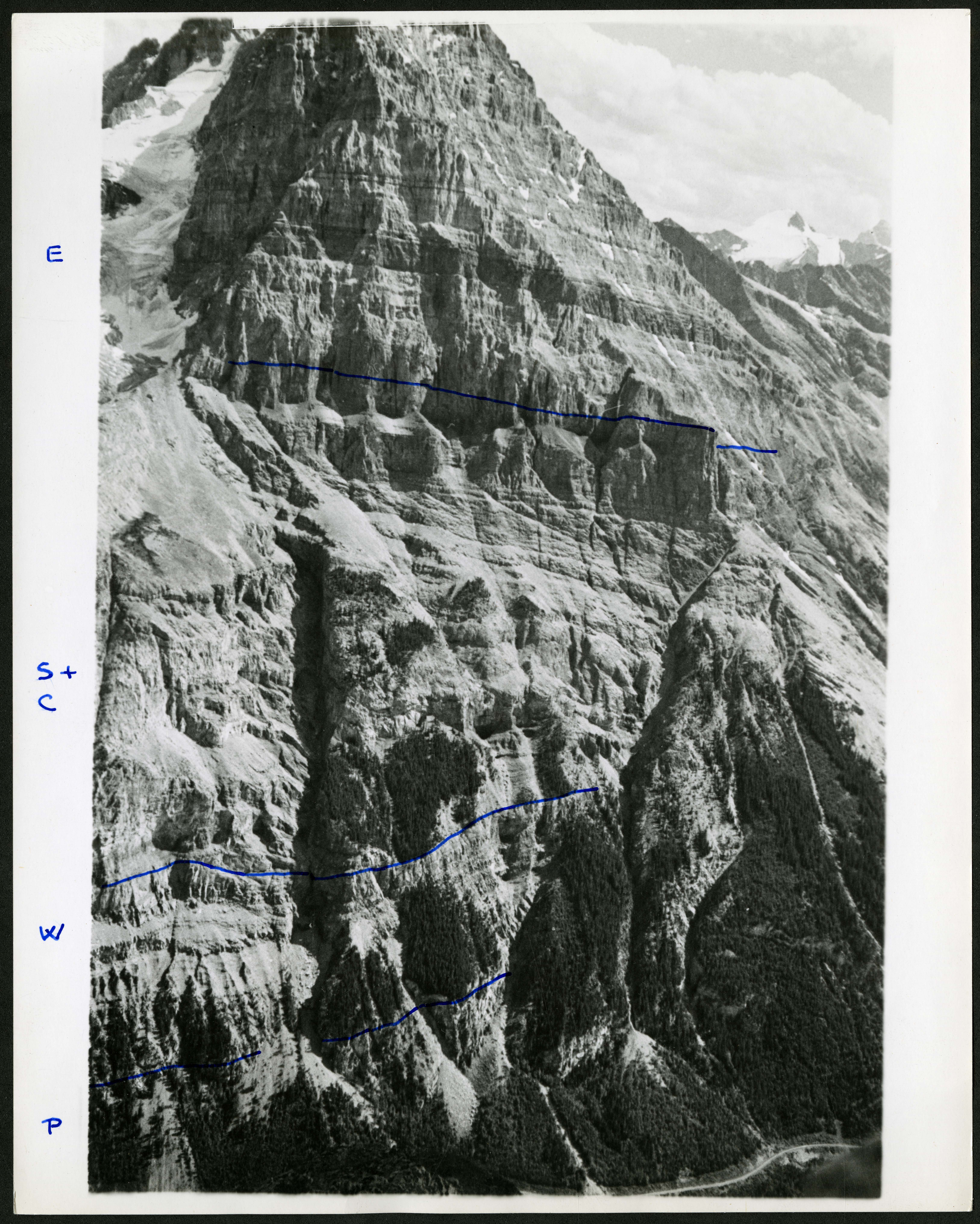
Northwest face of Mt. Stephen from the top of Mt. Field, showing North Gully and Fossil Gully

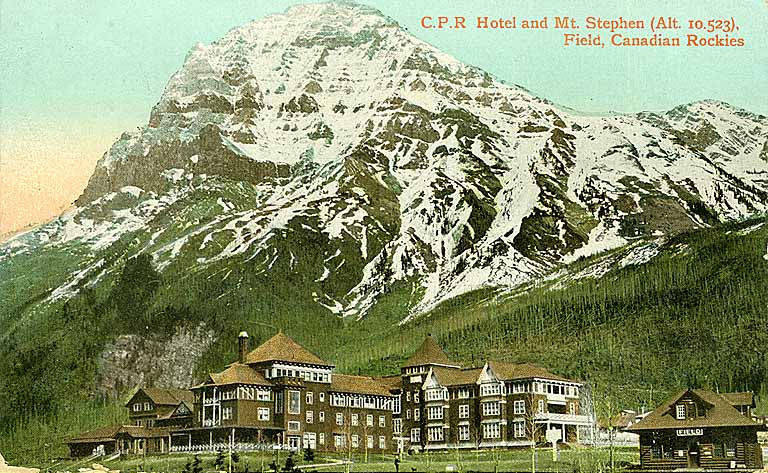
Hotel and Mount Stephen in 1908

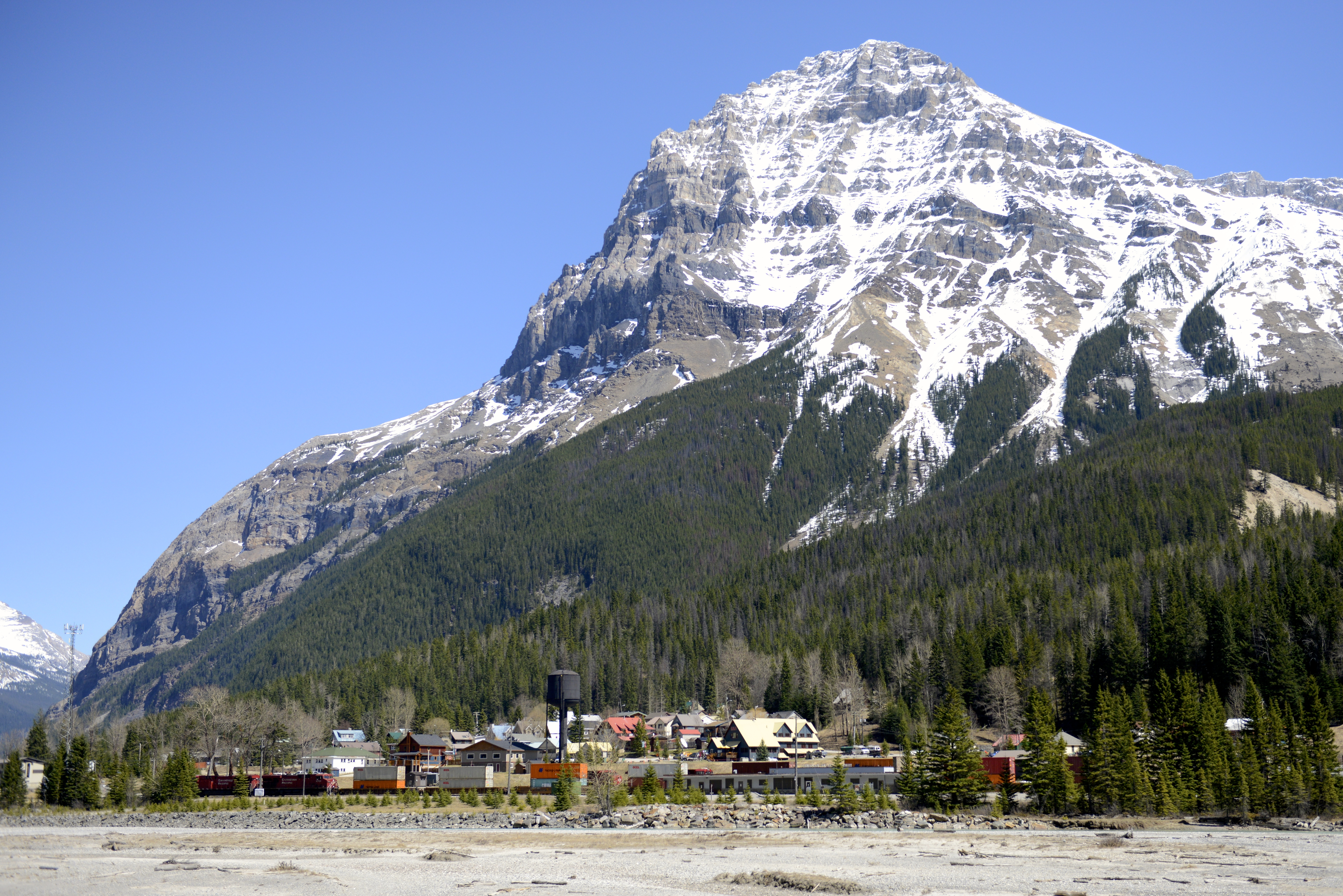
Mount Stephen and Field, British Columbia

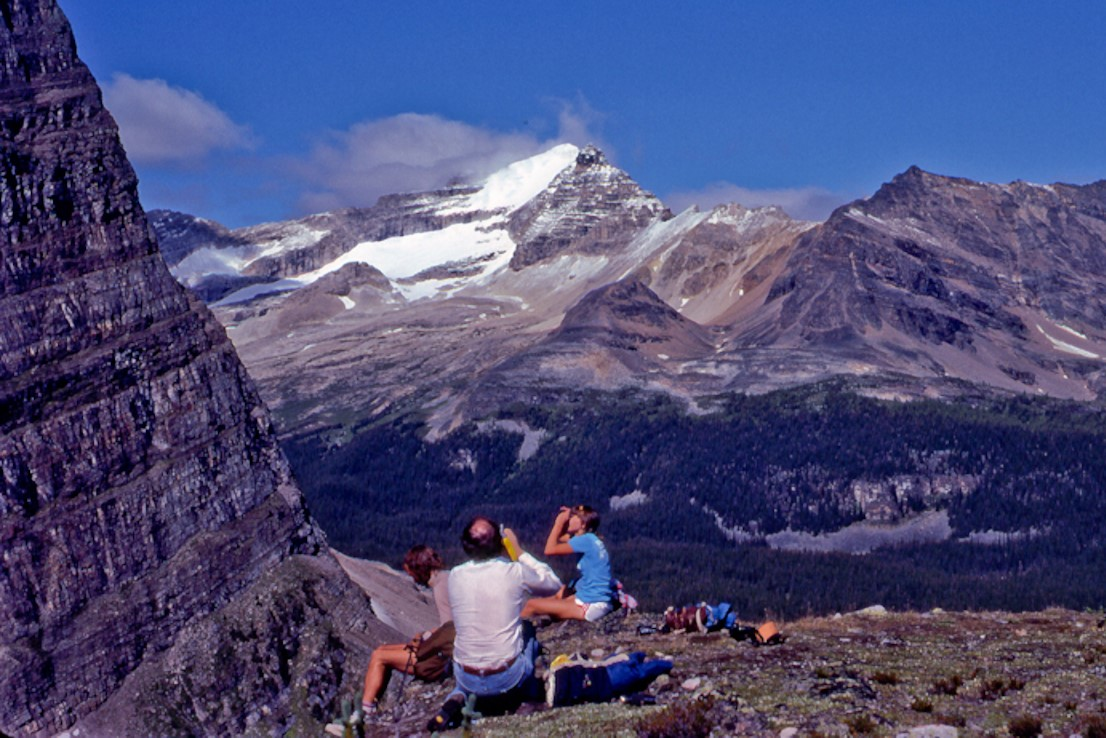
Stephen SE1 (Centre) from Odaray Prospect

== See also ==
- Mount Stephen trilobite beds
- Mount Stephen House
