= Phyllis Munday =

Canadian mountain climber

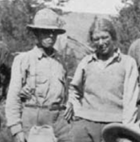
- Don and Phyllis Munday in 1933

Personal information
- Born: 24 September 1894 Sri Lanka
- Died: 11 April 1990 (aged 95) Nanaimo, British Columbia, Canada
- Occupations: Mountaineer; explorer; naturalist; humanitarian
- Spouse: Don Munday

Climbing career
- Type of climber: Mountaineering
- Major ascents: First woman to reach the summit of Mount Robson
- Known for: Discovering Mount Waddington

Phyllis Beatrice Munday CM (née James; 24 September 1894 – 11 April 1990) was a Canadian mountaineer, explorer, naturalist and humanitarian. She was famed for being the first woman to reach the summit of Mount Robson (with Annette Buck) in 1924, and with her husband Don for discovering Mount Waddington, and exploring the area around it via the Franklin River and the Homathko River.

Munday was awarded the Order of Canada in 1972 for her work with the Girl Guides of Canada and St. John Ambulance, as well as for her mountaineering career. Lady Peak in the Cheam Range was named for her by Arthur S. Williamson. Mount Munday is named after Don and Phyllis Munday, and Baby Munday Peak is named for their daughter Edith.

== Early life ==
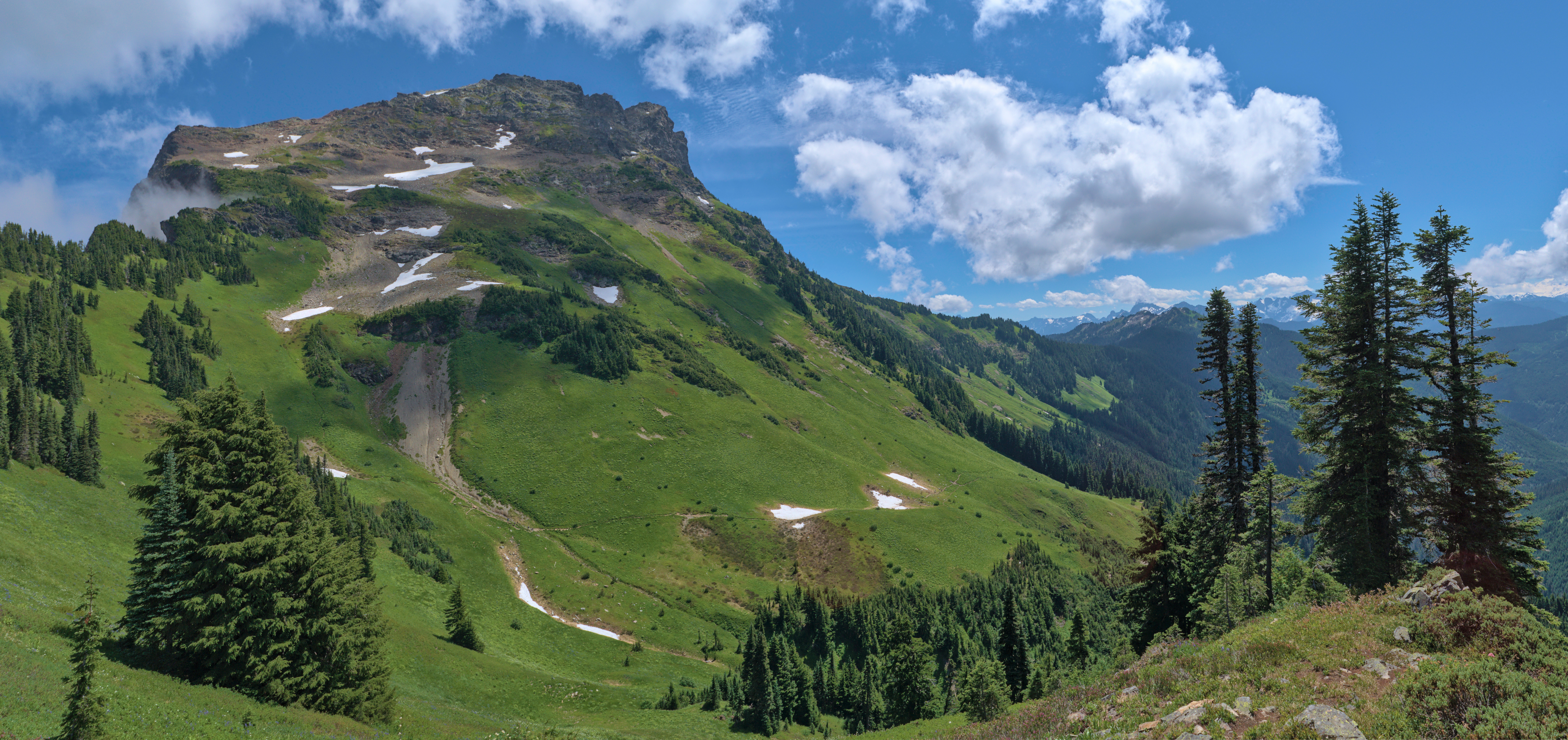
Lady Peak, named after Phyllis Munday, viewed from the Cheam Peak trail

Phyllis Beatrice James was born on 24 September 1894 in Ceylon (now Sri Lanka). Her parents, Frank and Beatrice James, were members of the upper class, as Frank managed tea plantations for the Lipton and Ridgways companies.

The family departed Ceylon in 1901, and moved to England, and then Manitoba, before settling on the western shore of Kootenay Lake in 1903. Phyllis and her sister Betty enjoyed their opportunities for exploration in the Kootenays, but Frank disliked the instability of the mining business, and in 1907 the family sought to emigrate to New Zealand.

The family traveled Vancouver by steamship and train, intending to continue on to New Zealand, but they instead stayed in Vancouver, where in 1912 she climbed Grouse Mountain with her Girl Guide company. In 1915, at 21, Phyllis joined the British Columbia Mountaineering Club and began going on club trips to such places as Mount Seymour, The Lions, Mount Tantalus and Mount Garibaldi.

== Meeting Don ==
Phyllis met her future husband in 1918. While on a mountaineering trip an incident occurred which, in Don's words, "lends itself readily to being given a romantic aspect." Don lost his footing on a glacial moraine, and was in danger of slipping into a crevasse. Phyllis jumped to help him restore his balance, and in so doing lost hers. Don managed to grab and steady her until she could regain her feet.

They married in February 1920, spending their honeymoon in a cabin on Dam Mountain near Vancouver. Their daughter, Edith was born in 1921, and at 11 weeks she was carried to the top of Crown Mountain.

From 1923 to 1926 the Mundays lived in a tent, and then a cabin on Grouse Mountain where Don worked cutting a trail from Lonsdale Avenue in North Vancouver, British Columbia, to the summit, while Phyllis ran the Alpine Lodge, serving hot drinks and meals to hikers.

== Exploration of the Waddington Range ==
In 1925, while on a trip to Mount Arrowsmith, Vancouver Island, Don and Phyllis Munday spotted what they believed to be a peak taller than Mount Robson, the then accepted tallest peak entirely within British Columbia. In the words of Don Munday: "The compass showed the alluring peak stood along a line passing a little east of Bute Inlet and perhaps 150 miles away, where blank spaces on the map left ample room for many nameless mountains."

While there is some debate as to whether the peak they saw was actually Mount Waddington, with Don Munday observing that the feat is impossible, they almost certainly saw a peak in the Waddington Range, and this led the Mundays to explore the area, and discover Mount Waddington.

Over the next decade, the Munday's mounted several expeditions into the area in an attempt to climb it. Known to them as "The Mystery Mountain", in 1927 the height was measured at 13,260 feet (by triangulation by BC Land Surveyor J.T. Underhill), and the Canadian Geographic Board gave it the name Mount Waddington after Alfred Waddington who was a proponent of a railway through the Homathko River valley. They reached the lower summit in 1928, deeming the main summit too risky.

== Significant events ==
- 1894 born in Sri Lanka
- 1916 founded the Girl Guide movement in British Columbia
- 1920 established the first St. John Ambulance brigade in North Vancouver, British Columbia
- 1938 honorary lifetime membership in the Alpine Club of Canada
- 1972 inducted into the Order of Canada
- 1998 stamp imprinted in her honour

== First ascents ==
- 1922 Parapet Peak
- 1922 Isosceles Peak
- 1923 Blackcomb Peak
- 1923 Overlord Mountain
- 1924 Foley Peak
- 1930 Mount Munday
- 1931 Jubilee Mountain
- 1931 Sockeye Peak
- 1933 Combatant Mountain
- 1936 Silverthrone Mountain
- 1937 Mount Sir Richard
- 1942 Mount Queen Bess
- 1946 Reliance Mountain

== Honors ==
- Honorary member, Appalachian Mountain Club
- Honorary member, Ladies' Alpine Club of Great Britain (1936)
- Honorary member, American Alpine Club (1967)
