= Lucky Four Group =

Group of mountains in British Columbia

The Lucky Four Group is the name for a group of four mountains in the Cheam Range of the North Cascades of British Columbia east of the city of Chilliwack. The name of the region comes from the abandoned Lucky Four Mine near Foley Peak, and refers to the four summits in the eastern end of the range that are visible from the old mine access road that runs near Wahleach (Jones) Lake.

The mountains in this group, from north to south, are:

- Foley Peak
- Welch Peak
- Stewart Peak
- Knight Peak
