= Englishman River =

Watercourse in British Columbia, Canada

Coordinates: 49°19′32″N 124°17′30″W

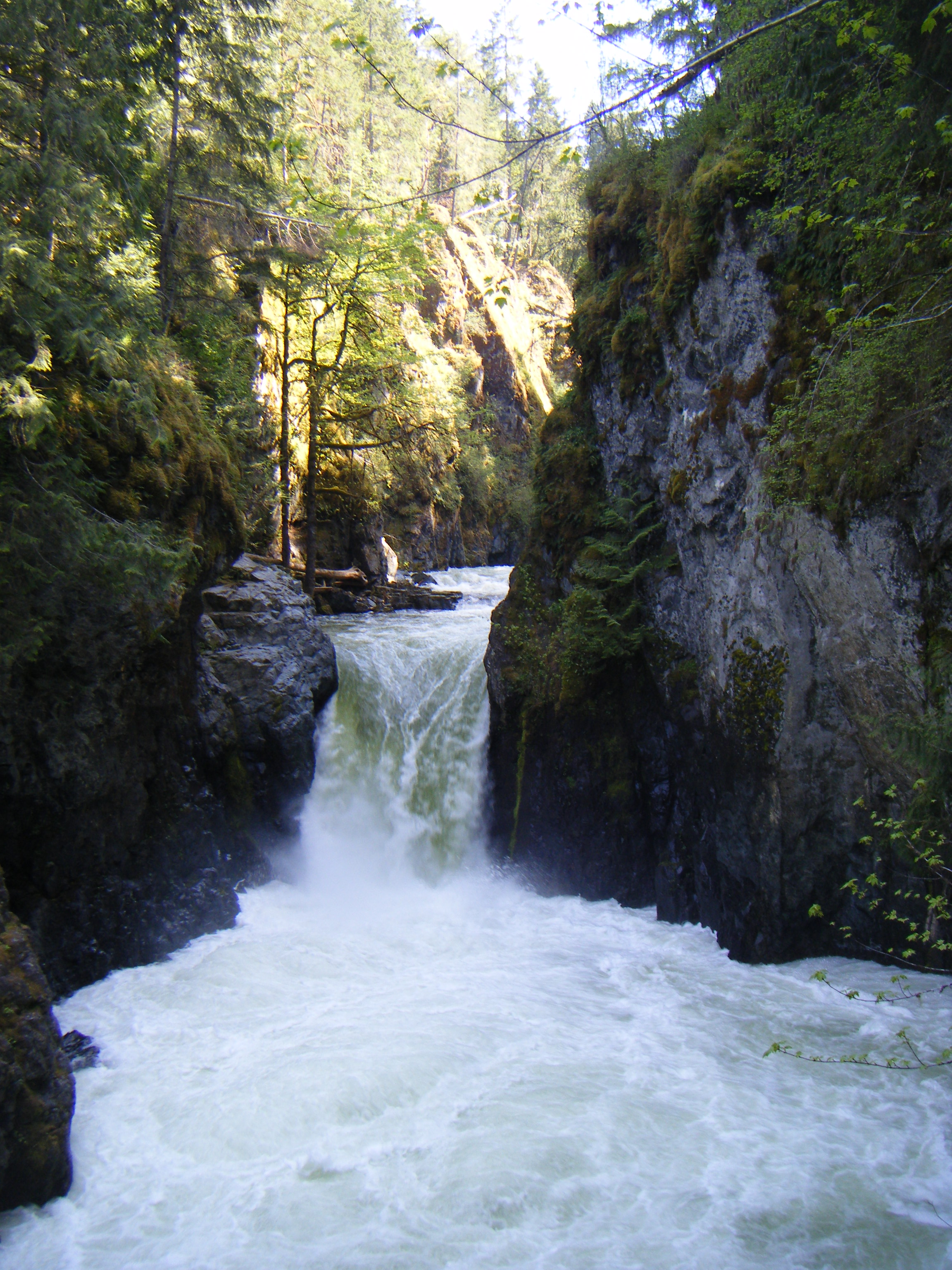
The Englishman River falls

Englishman River (Halkomelem: K̓wal̓uxw) is a river in the eastern side of Vancouver Island, British Columbia, Canada. It starts on the eastern slopes of the Beaufort Range, originating from tiny Jewel Lake and flowing in an easterly direction for 40 km (25 mi), entering the Strait of Georgia at Parksville, British Columbia. It is an important watershed providing habitat for various species of salmon and community water to the residents of Parksville and surrounding area. The Englishman River watershed includes Arrowsmith Lake, Hidden Lake, Fishtail Lake, Rowbotham Lake, Healy Lake, Shelton Lake, and Rhododendron Lake.

Englishman River Falls Provincial Park is a popular tourist destination approximately 10 km (6.2 mi) upstream from the mouth of the river. It is famed for its two picturesque waterfalls and treed campsites. The park was created on December 20, 1940, in an effort to protect the old-growth forest and its associated ecosystem along the river in the vicinity of the waterfalls.

A dammed reservoir on the Englishman is a source of water for Parksville, British Columbia.

== South Englishman River ==
The Englishman's south fork begins at Shelton (Echo) Lake and shortly after exiting the north end of that lake enters Healy (Panther) Lake. The river then exits the far end of the lake and flows northeast to where it merges with the main fork of the Englishman.

== History ==
The indigenous name of the river, Kw’a’luxw, comes from the island dialect of Halkomelem, meaning "dog salmon" due to the river's well-known salmon populations.

According to a local legend, Indigenous people in the area found the skeleton of a Caucasian man near the waterfalls, thus giving the river its current name; the river was given its name because "an Englishman was drowned while attempting to cross." A further source is cited as "Hirst, being the first settler by the river, was referred to by Indians as ‘that Englishman by the river‘. Hence the name Englishman's River came to be known". Spanish mapmakers originally named it the "Rio de Grullas," presumably because of the large number of great blue herons living at its estuary (grulla being Spanish for "crane").

== See also ==
- List of rivers of British Columbia
