= Knight Peak =

Mountain summit located in Cheam Range of British Columbia, Canada

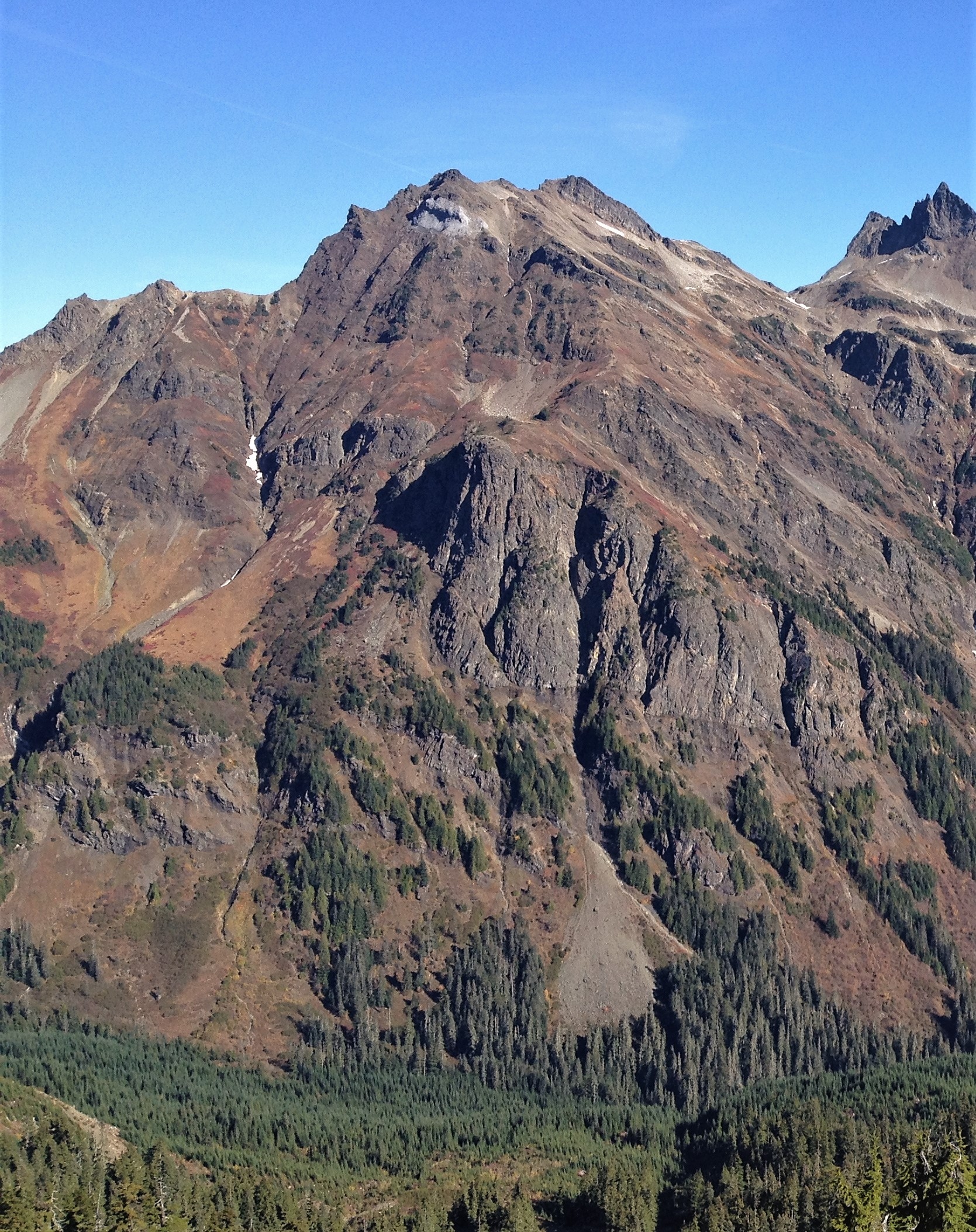
- Southwest aspect

Highest point
- Elevation: 2,235 m (7,333 ft)
- Prominence: 195 m (640 ft)
- Parent peak: Baby Munday Peak (2,250 m)
- Isolation: 0.72 km (0.45 mi)
- Listing: Mountains of British Columbia
- Coordinates: 49°10′07″N 121°38′16″W

Naming
- Etymology: Ebe B. Knight

Geography
- Location within British Columbia Location within Canada
- Interactive map of Knight Peak
- Country: Canada
- Province: British Columbia
- District: Yale Division Yale Land District
- Parent range: Cascade Range; North Cascades; Cheam Range
- Topo map: NTS 92H4 Chilliwack

Geology
- Mountain type: Fault block

Climbing
- First ascent: 1892

Knight Peak is a 2,235-metre-elevation (7,333-foot) mountain summit located in the Cheam Range of British Columbia, Canada.

== Description ==
Knight Peak is situated 21 kilometres (13 miles) east of Chilliwack and 4 kilometres (2.5 miles) south of the southern tip of Wahleach Lake. Knight Peak is more notable for its steep rise above local terrain than for its absolute elevation. Topographic relief is significant as the south aspect rises over 1,000 metres (3,300 feet) above Airplane Creek in 1.5 km (0.93 mi), and the north aspect rises 1,500 metres (4,900 feet) in 2 kilometres (1.2 miles). Precipitation runoff from this mountain drains south to the Chilliwack River via Airplane and Foley creeks, and north to the Fraser River via Wahleach Lake and Wahleach Creek. The nearest higher neighbor is Baby Munday Peak, 0.72 kilometres (0 miles) to the east.

== History ==
The first ascent of the summit was made in September 1892 by Ebe B. Knight and David Walker. Don Serl and Bruce Kay first climbed the northwest face in April 1987.

The peak was likely named after Ebe R. Knight who made the first ascent and was a leading spirit in various ascents in this area during 1888–1892. He also made first ascents of Cheam Peak, Stewart Peak and Lady Peak. The toponym was officially adopted May 30, 1946, by the Geographical Names Board of Canada.

== Climate ==
Knight Peak is located in the marine west coast climate zone of western North America. Most weather fronts originate in the Pacific Ocean, and travel northeast toward the Cascade Mountains. As fronts approach the North Cascades, they are forced upward by the peaks (Orographic lift), causing them to drop their moisture in the form of rain or snowfall onto the Cascades. As a result, the west side of the North Cascades experiences high precipitation, especially during the winter months in the form of snowfall. Because of maritime influence, snow tends to be wet and heavy, resulting in high avalanche danger. Temperatures in winter can drop below −20 °C with wind chill factors below −30 °C. This climate supports a small glacier in the cirque northeast of the peak. During winter months, weather is usually cloudy, but due to high pressure systems over the Pacific Ocean that intensify during summer months, there is often little or no cloud cover during the summer. The months July through September offer the most favorable weather for viewing or climbing this peak.

== Geology ==
The North Cascades feature some of the most rugged topography in the Cascade Range with craggy peaks, ridges, and deep glacial valleys. Geological events occurring many years ago created the diverse topography and drastic elevation changes over the Cascade Range leading to various climate differences.

The history of the formation of the Cascade Mountains dates back millions of years ago to the late Eocene Epoch. With the North American Plate overriding the Pacific Plate, episodes of volcanic igneous activity persisted. In addition, small fragments of the oceanic and continental lithosphere called terranes created the North Cascades about 50 million years ago.

During the Pleistocene period dating back over two million years ago, glaciation advancing and retreating repeatedly scoured the landscape leaving deposits of rock debris. The U-shaped cross section of the river valleys is a result of recent glaciation. Uplift and faulting in combination with glaciation have been the dominant processes which have created the tall peaks and deep valleys of the North Cascades area.

== Gallery ==
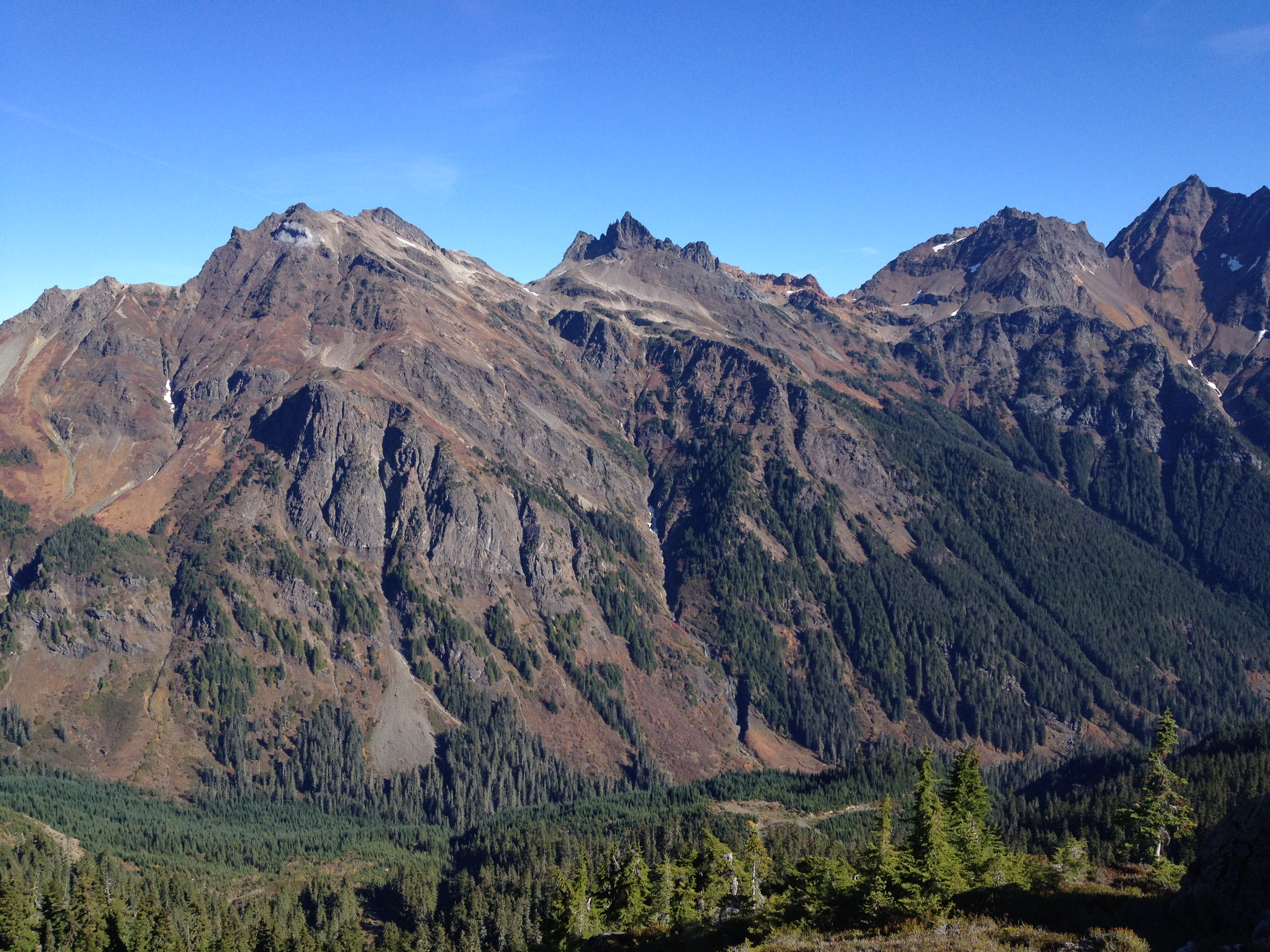
Cheam Range seen from Mt. Laughington. Left to rightː Knight Peak, Baby Munday Peak, The Still, and part of Welch Peak.

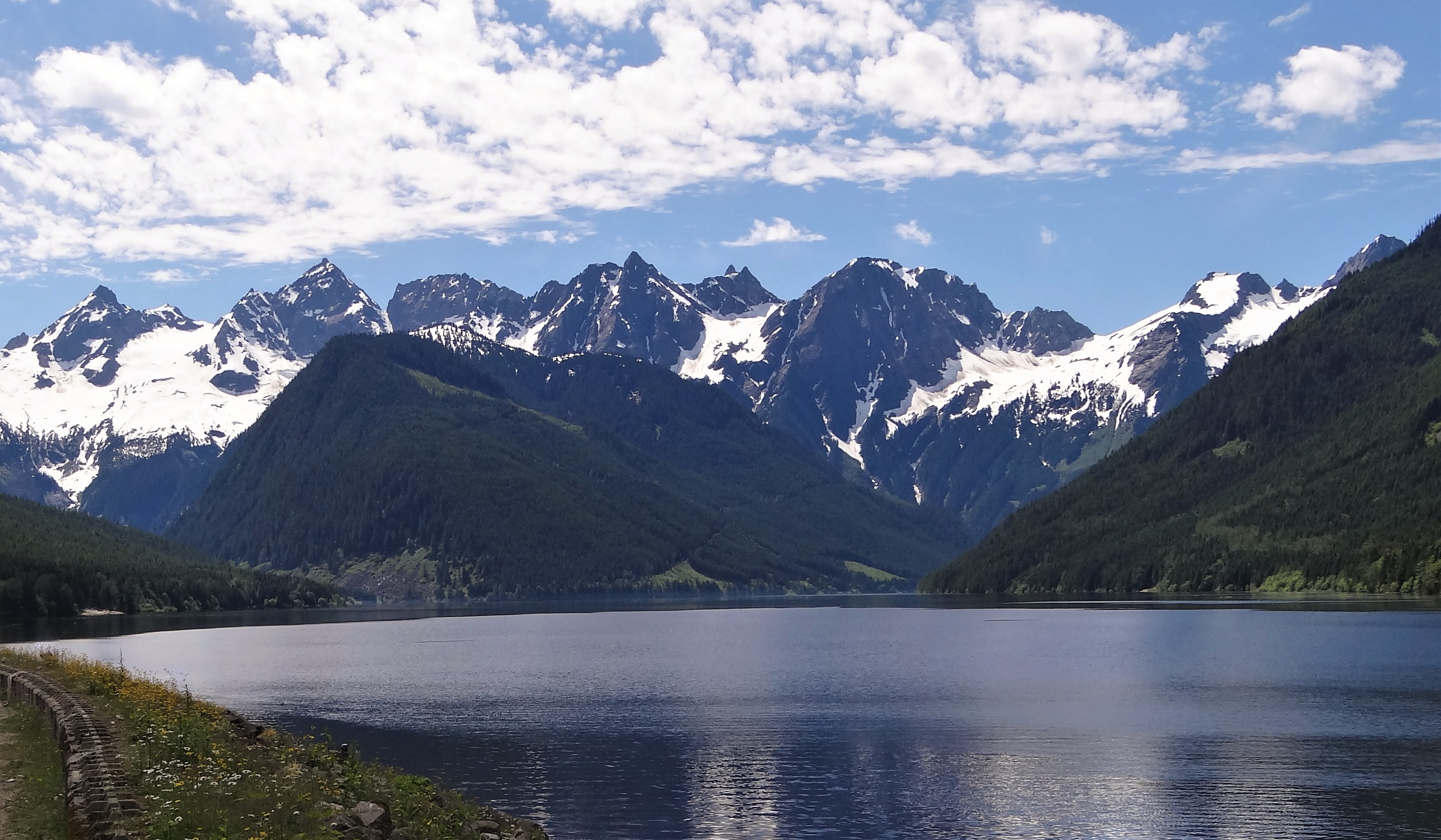
Cheam Range seen from the north at Wahleach Lake.
Knight Peak is the large peak to right of center.

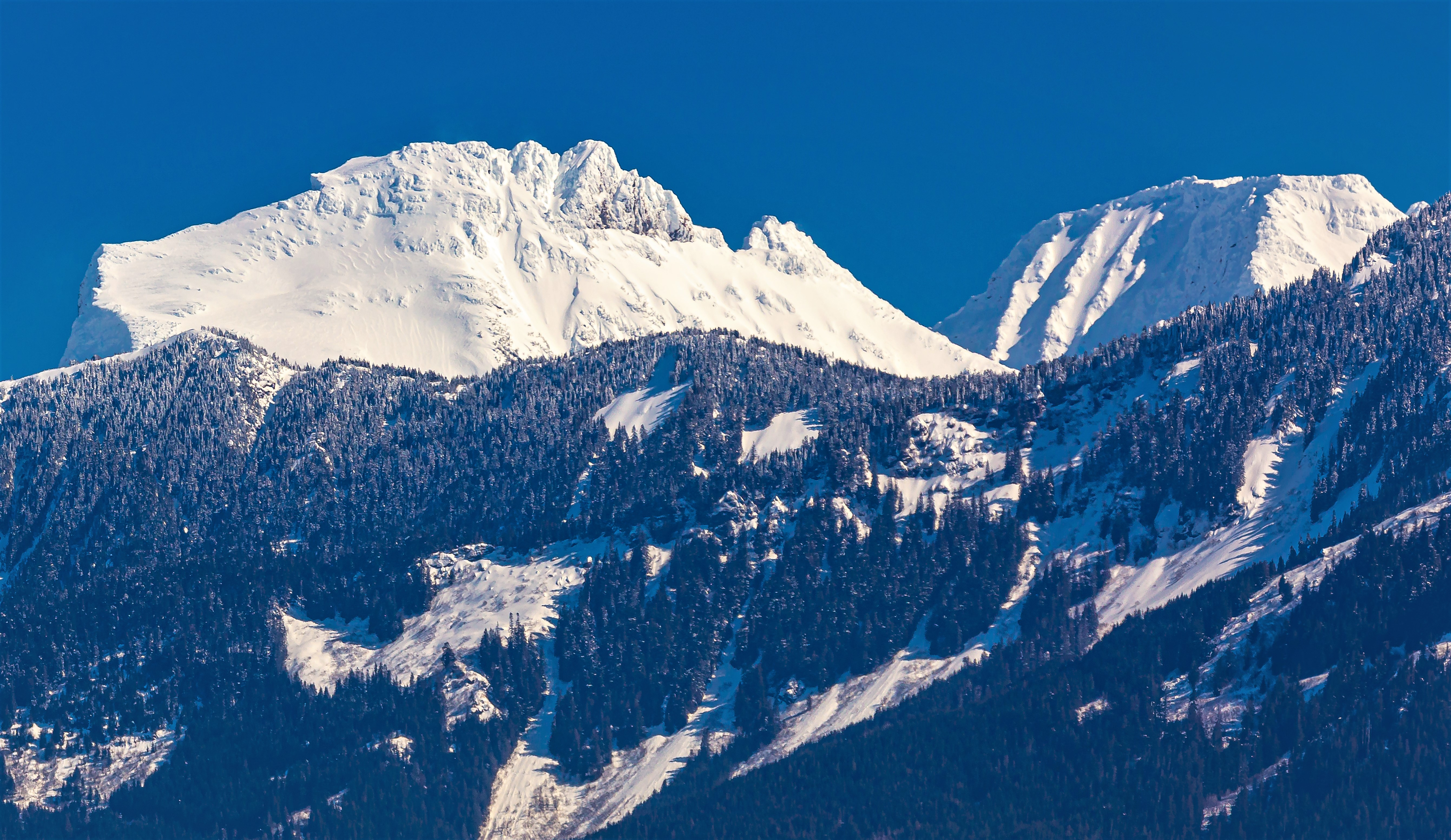
Lady Peak (left) and Knight Peak (right) seen from west near Chilliwack

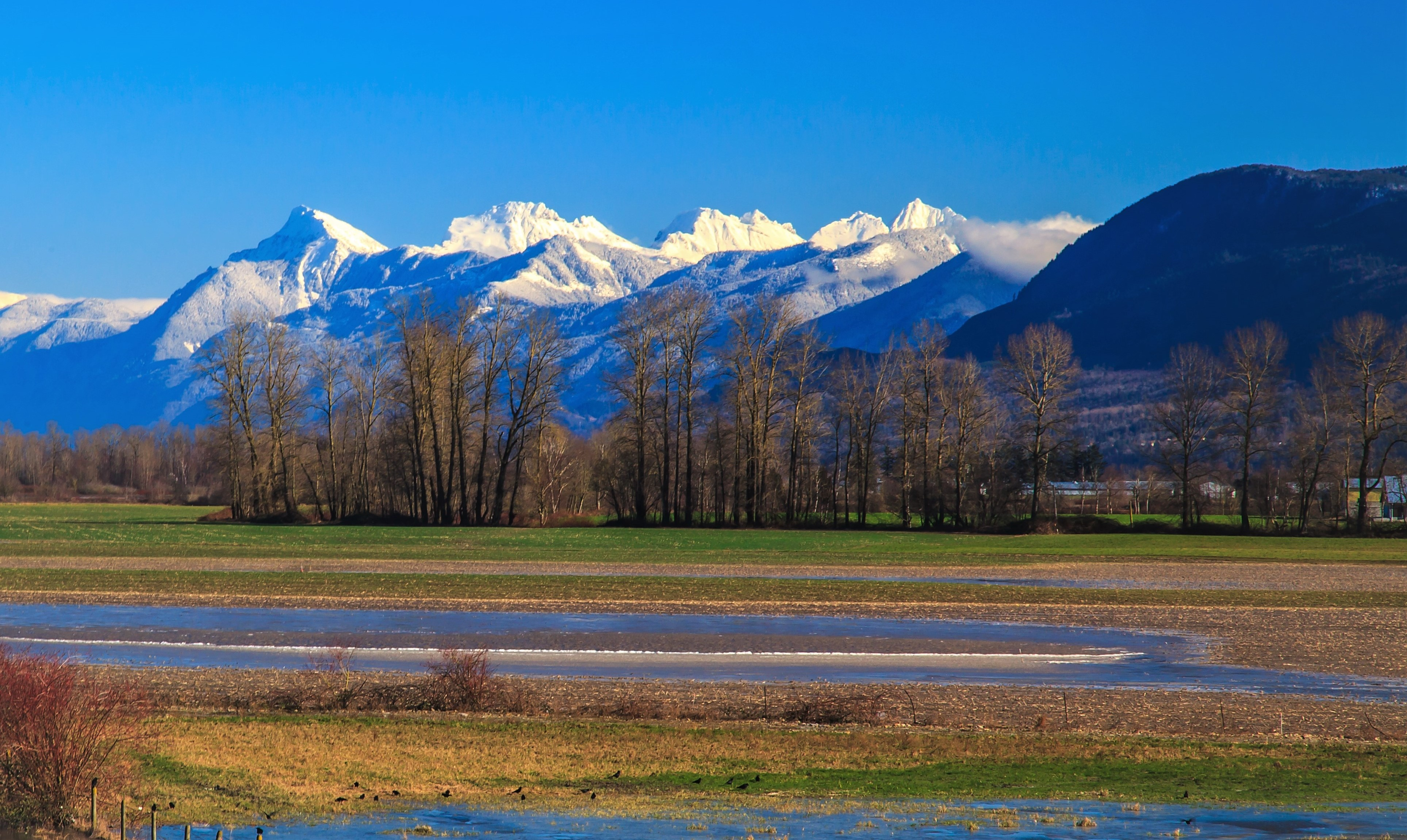
Cheam Range seen from the west near Chilliwack.
L to R: Cheam, Lady, Knight (center), Baby Munday, Still, Welch.

== See also ==
- Geography of the North Cascades
