= Fish tale =

Fish tale or fish tales may refer to:

- Fish Tales (EP), a 1990 EP by The 3Ds
- Fish Tales (film), a 1936 American animated short film starring Porky Pig
- Fish Tales (pinball), a 1992 pinball game
- Fish Tale Ale, a brand of the Fish Brewing Company in Olympia, Washington, United States
- A Fish Tale, an alternate title for the 2000 Danish animated film Help! I'm a Fish

== See also ==
- The Tale of the Fisherman and the Fish, an 1833 fairy tale in verse by Alexander Pushkin
- Tall tale
- Fishtail (disambiguation)
