= Williams Peak (British Columbia) =

Mountain in the country of Canada

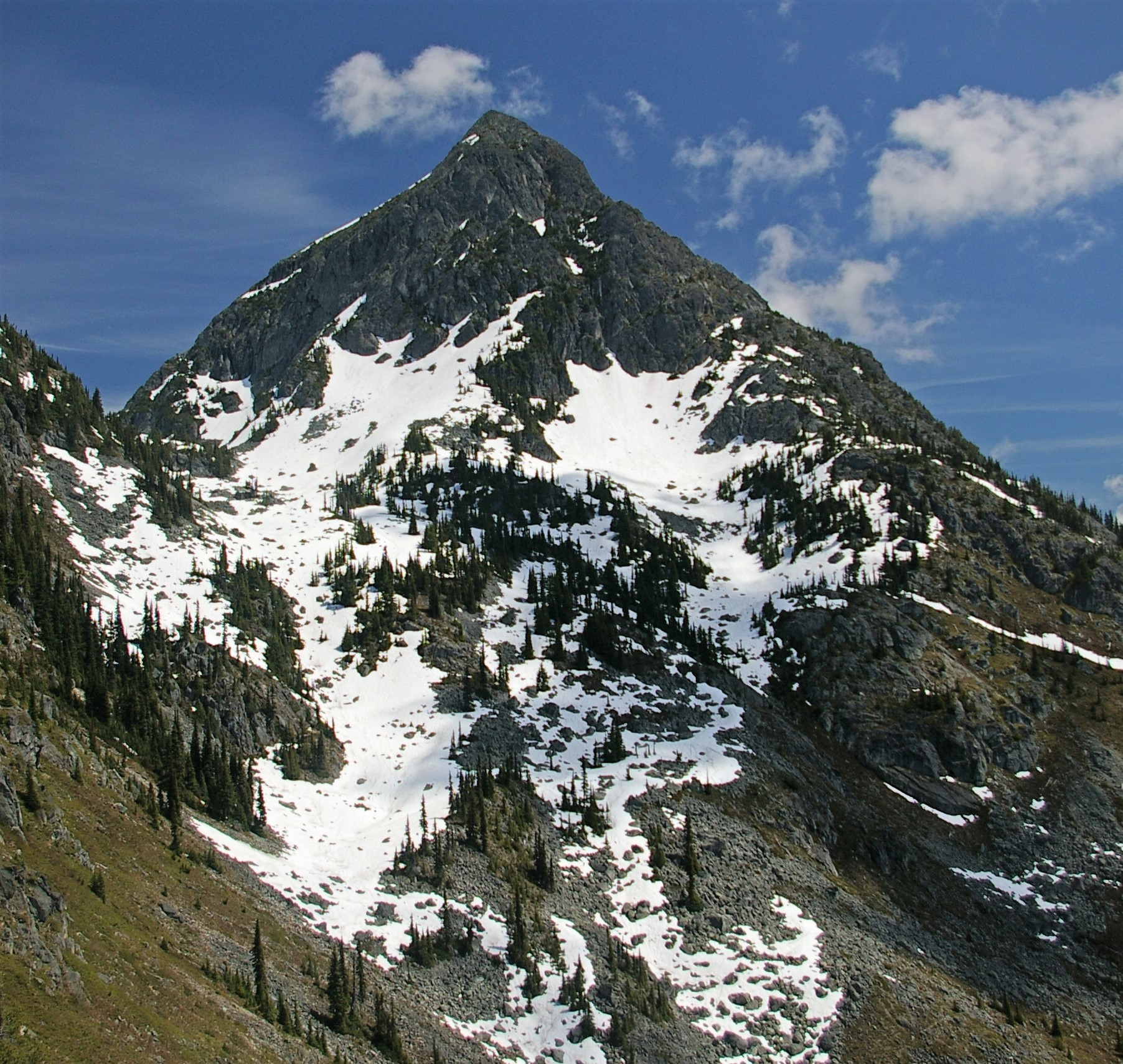
- Williams Peak, west aspect

Highest point
- Elevation: 2,123 m (6,965 ft)
- Prominence: 793 m (2,602 ft)
- Parent peak: Foley Peak (2293 m)
- Listing: Mountains of British Columbia
- Coordinates: 49°07′46″N 121°30′19″W

Geography
- Location within British Columbia Location within Canada
- Interactive map of Williams Peak
- Location: British Columbia, Canada
- District: Yale Division Yale Land District
- Parent range: Skagit Range; North Cascades
- Topo map: NTS 92H4 Chilliwack

Geology
- Mountain type: Intrusive
- Volcanic belt: Pemberton Volcanic Belt

Climbing
- First ascent: 1908 by James J. McArthur and E.T. de Coeli
- Easiest route: Scrambling

Williams Peak is a prominent 2,123-metre (6,965-foot) mountain summit located in the Chilliwack River valley of the Cascade Mountains in southwestern British Columbia, Canada. It is situated 14 km (9 mi) north of the Canada–United States border, 6 km (4 mi) northwest of Chilliwack Lake, and 6.7 km (4 mi) southeast of Foley Peak, which is its nearest higher peak. Williams Peak is the highest point of the South Hope Mountains, which is a subset of the Skagit Range. Precipitation runoff from the peak drains into tributaries of the Chilliwack River. The mountain's name was officially adopted April 7, 1955, by the Geographical Names Board of Canada. Williams Peak was first climbed July 1908 by James J. McArthur and E.T. de Coeli via the southwest ridge.

== Geology ==
Williams Peak is related to the Chilliwack batholith, which intruded the region 26 to 29 million years ago after the major orogenic episodes in the region. This is part of the Pemberton Volcanic Belt, an eroded volcanic belt that formed as a result of subduction of the Farallon Plate starting 29 million years ago.

During the Pleistocene period dating back over two million years ago, glaciation advancing and retreating repeatedly scoured the landscape leaving deposits of rock debris. The U-shaped cross section of the river valleys is a result of recent glaciation. Uplift and faulting in combination with glaciation have been the dominant processes which have created the tall peaks and deep valleys of the North Cascades area.

The North Cascades features some of the most rugged topography in the Cascade Range with craggy peaks and ridges, deep glacial valleys, and granite spires. Geological events occurring many years ago created the diverse topography and drastic elevation changes over the Cascade Range leading to various climate differences which lead to vegetation variety defining the ecoregions in this area.

== Climate ==
Based on the Köppen climate classification, Williams Peak is located in the marine west coast climate zone of western North America. Most weather fronts originate in the Pacific Ocean, and travel east toward the Cascade Range where they are forced upward by the range (Orographic lift), causing them to drop their moisture in the form of rain or snowfall. As a result, the Cascade Mountains experience high precipitation, especially during the winter months in the form of snowfall. Temperatures can drop below −20 °C with wind chill factors below −30 °C. The months July through September offer the most favorable weather for climbing Williams Peak.

== Climbing routes ==
Established rock climbing routes on Williams Peak:

- Southwest Ridge - class 3 First Ascent 1908
- East Buttress - class 5.7 FA 1980
- Standard "Gulley Route" - class 3
- North side

== See also ==
- Canadian Cascade Arc
- Geography of the North Cascades
- Geology of British Columbia
