= Rowbotham Lake =

- Location within Vancouver Island
- Location: Vancouver Island, British Columbia
- Coordinates: 49°14′00″N 124°30′00″W
- Lake type: Natural lake
- Basin countries: Canada

Rowbotham Lake is a lake located on Vancouver Island, Canada, north of Englishman River and east of Mount Arrowsmith.

== See also ==
- List of lakes of British Columbia
