= Lady Peak =

Mountain in British Columbia, Canada

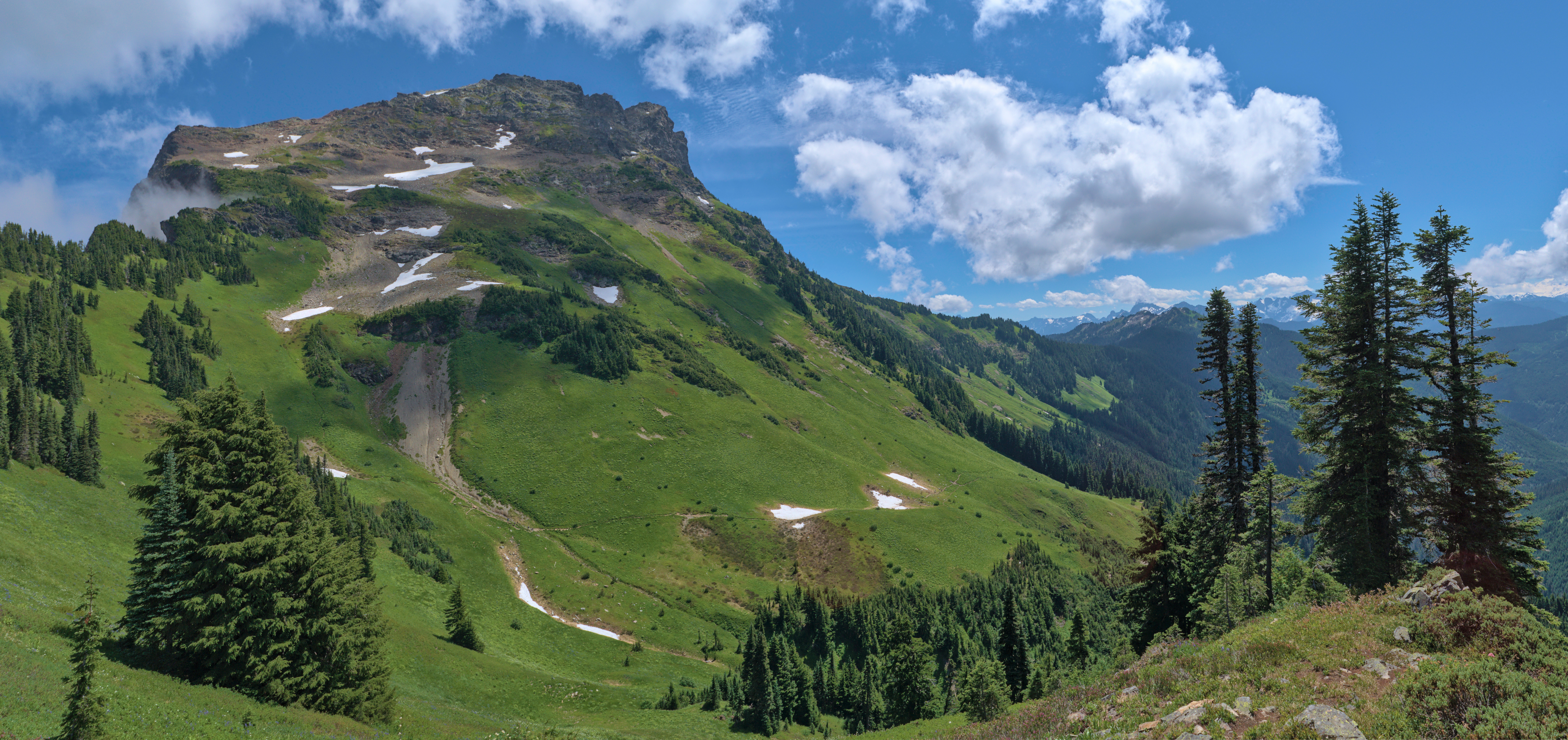
- Lady Peak viewed from the Cheam Peak trail

Highest point
- Elevation: 2,178 m (7,146 ft)
- Prominence: 328 m (1,076 ft)
- Parent peak: Knight Peak (2,235 m)
- Coordinates: 49°10′31″N 121°39′57″W

Geography
- Location within British Columbia Location within Canada
- Interactive map of Lady Peak
- Location: British Columbia, Canada
- District: Yale Division Yale Land District
- Parent range: Cascade Range; North Cascades; Cheam Range
- Topo map: NTC 92H4 Chilliwack

Climbing
- First ascent: 1889 Ebe Knight; J. Smith; I. Henderson
- Easiest route: NW Flank, hiking and some scrambling

Lady Peak is a mountain located just southeast of Cheam Peak in the Cheam Range near Chilliwack, British Columbia. It is west of the four peaks in the eastern portion of the range known as the Lucky Four Group, consisting of Knight, Foley, Stewart and Welch peaks.

According to the Canadian Mountain Encyclopedia "From the Chilliwack area, according to Sto:lo Nation culture, Lady Peak looks like the head of a dog. This dog is the companion of the Old Woman, Cheam".

Lady Peak can be summited by a route that branches off the Cheam Peak Trail.

The peak was named by Arthur S. Williamson, superintendent of the nearby Lucky Four Mine, to honor Phyllis Munday, the well-known Canadian mountaineer. Williamson also named nearby Baby Munday Peak in honor of her daughter, Edith. Both toponyms were officially adopted in 1946 by the Geographical Names Board of Canada.

== Climate ==
Lady Peak is located in the marine west coast climate zone of western North America. Most weather fronts originate in the Pacific Ocean, and travel northeast toward the Cascade Mountains. As fronts approach the North Cascades, they are forced upward by the peaks (Orographic lift), causing them to drop their moisture in the form of rain or snowfall onto the Cascades. As a result, the west side of the North Cascades experiences high precipitation, especially during the winter months in the form of snowfall. Because of maritime influence, snow tends to be wet and heavy, resulting in high avalanche danger. Temperatures in winter can drop below −20 °C (−4 °F) with wind chill factors below −30 °C (−22 °F). During winter months, weather is usually cloudy, but due to high pressure systems over the Pacific Ocean that intensify during summer months, there is often little or no cloud cover during the summer. The months July through September offer the most favourable weather for viewing or climbing this peak.

== Geology ==
The North Cascades feature some of the most rugged topography in the Cascade Range with craggy peaks, ridges, and deep glacial valleys. Geological events occurring many years ago created the diverse topography and drastic elevation changes over the Cascade Range leading to various climate differences.

The history of the formation of the Cascade Mountains dates back millions of years ago to the late Eocene Epoch. With the North American Plate overriding the Pacific Plate, episodes of volcanic igneous activity persisted. In addition, small fragments of the oceanic and continental lithosphere called terranes created the North Cascades about 50 million years ago.

During the Pleistocene period dating back over two million years ago, glaciation advancing and retreating repeatedly scoured the landscape leaving deposits of rock debris. The U-shaped cross section of the river valleys is a result of recent glaciation. Uplift and faulting in combination with glaciation have been the dominant processes which have created the tall peaks and deep valleys of the North Cascades area.

== Gallery ==
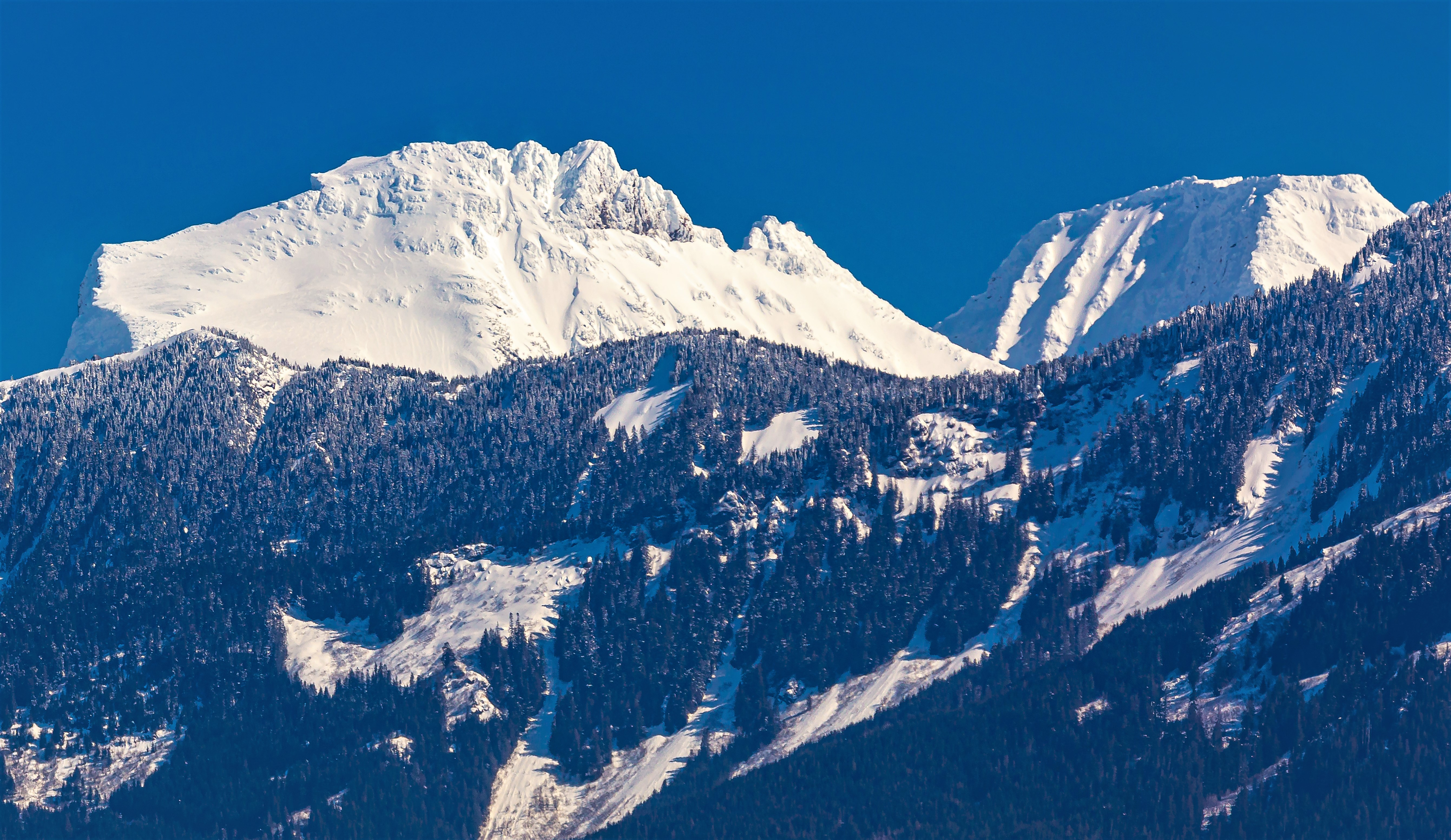
Lady Peak (left) and Knight Peak viewed just East of Chilliwack in winter

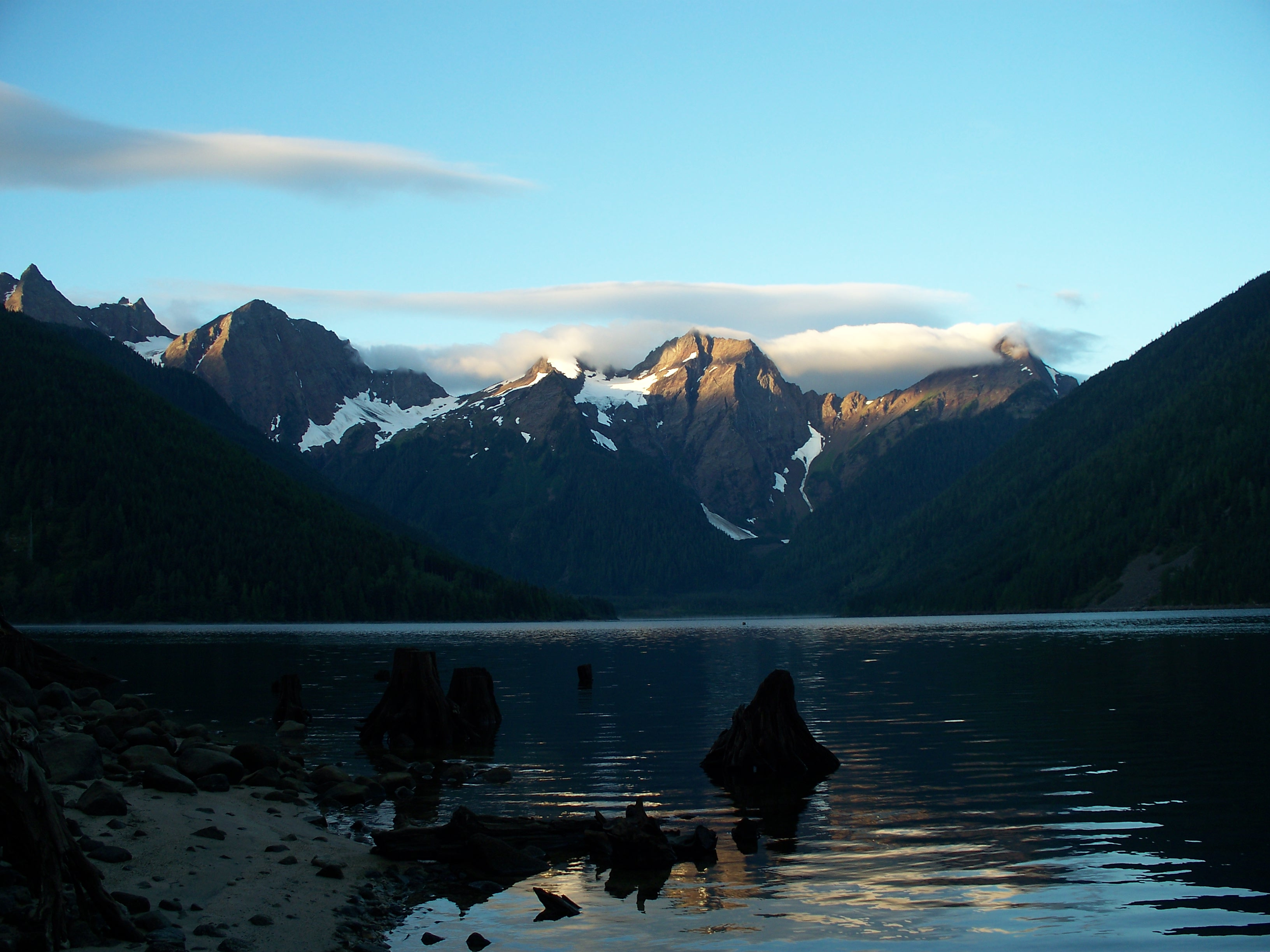
North aspect of Lady Peak (right of center) viewed from Jones Lake

== See also ==
- Cheam Peak
