= Fishtail =

Fishtail may refer to:

== Biology ==
- The rearmost fish fin or caudal fin
- Fishtail palm (genus Caryota)

== Transportation ==
- Fishtailing, a problem in car handling
- Fishtail Air, a helicopter airline based in Kathmandu, Nepal

== Places ==
- Fishtail, Montana, a town
- Fishtail Point, southernmost point of Shults Peninsula in Antarctica
- Fishtail Lake, lake on Vancouver Island in British Columbia, Canada
- Fishtail Rock, a geologic feature on Hoi Sham Island, a former island near Hong Kong
- Fishtail Butte; see List of mountains in Stillwater County, Montana
- Fishtail Lagoon, a body of water in the Keyhaven, Pennington, Oxey and Normandy Marshes
- Machapuchare, "Fish's Tail", a mountain in Nepal

== Tools ==
- Fishtail (tool), a wood carving tool and for gardening
- Fishtail gauge
- Fishtail projectile point a type of Palaeolithic stone projectile point

== Clothing ==
- Fishtail parka, a type of anorak, such as the US Army's M-65 parka
- Fishtail train, a flared train (the long back portion of various clothing that trails behind the wearer)
- Fishtail wrap, a style of folding or draping a sari

== Culture ==
- Fishtail (Quickstep), a Quickstep dance figure
- A form of the scrollwork, graphic design

== See also ==
- Fish tale (disambiguation)
- Lobster Trap and Fish Tail, mobile by American artist Alexander Calder
- Fish Tail Blues, a blues song attributed to American musician Jelly Roll Morton
