= Baby Munday Peak =

Mountain in the country of Canada

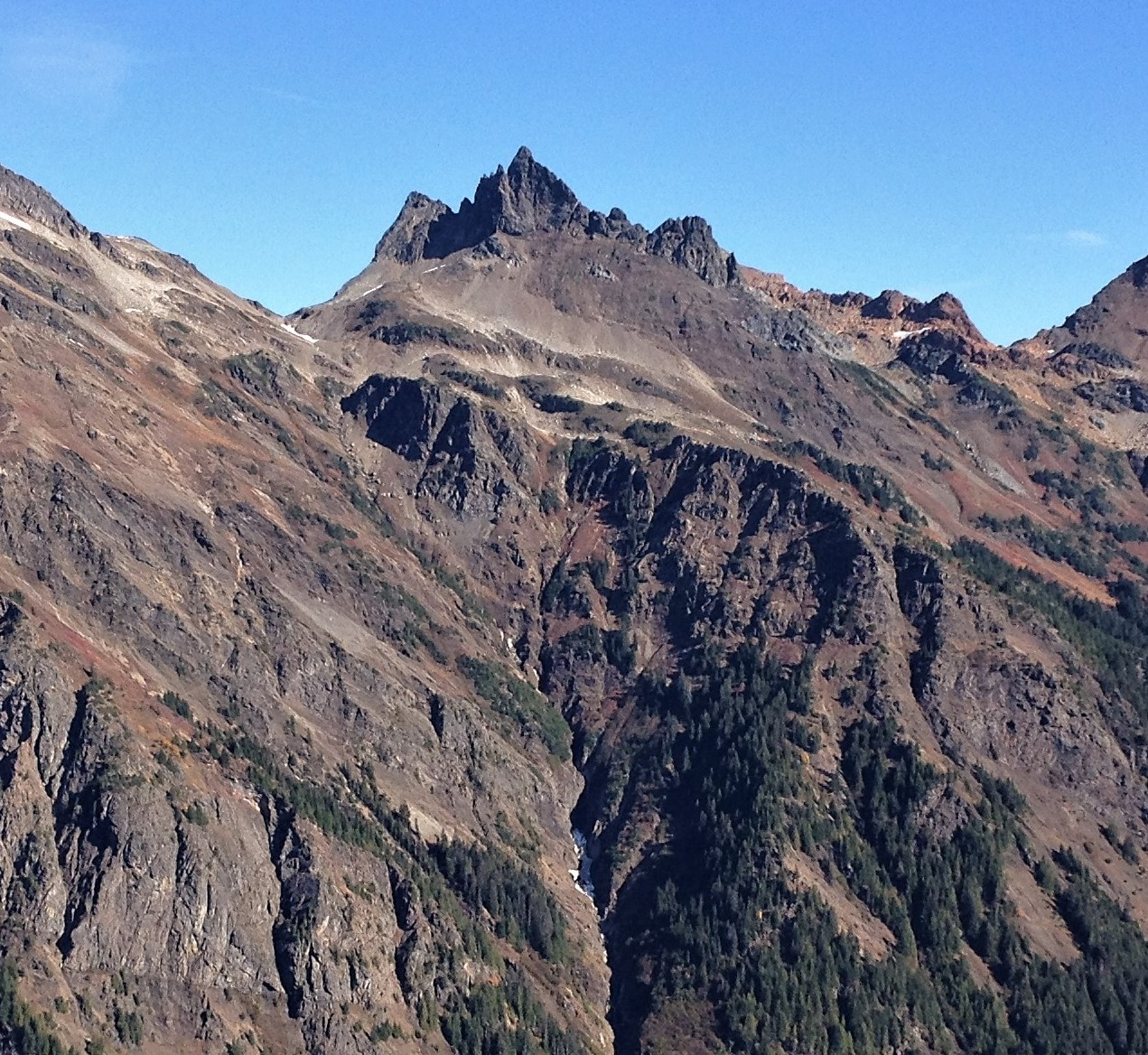
- Southwest aspect

Highest point
- Elevation: 2,250 m (7,382 ft)
- Prominence: 230 m (755 ft)
- Parent peak: Welch Peak (2,431 m)
- Isolation: 1.35 km (0.84 mi)
- Listing: Mountains of British Columbia
- Coordinates: 49°10′00″N 121°37′42″W

Naming
- Etymology: Edith Munday

Geography
- Location within British Columbia Location within Canada
- Interactive map of Baby Munday Peak
- Country: Canada
- Province: British Columbia
- District: Yale Division Yale Land District
- Parent range: Cascade Range; North Cascades; Cheam Range
- Topo map: NTS 92H4 Chilliwack

Geology
- Mountain type: Fault block

Climbing
- First ascent: 1933
- Easiest route: Southeast ridge

Baby Munday Peak is a 2,250-meter-elevation (7,382-foot) mountain summit located in the Cheam Range of British Columbia, Canada.

== Description ==
Baby Munday Peak is a sharp summit set 22 kilometers (14 miles) east of Chilliwack and 4 km (2.5 mi) south of the southern tip of Wahleach Lake. Baby Munday Peak is more notable for its steep rise above local terrain than for its absolute elevation. Topographic relief is significant as the summit rises 1,150 meters (3,770 feet) above Airplane Creek in 1.5 km (0.93 mi). Precipitation runoff from this mountain drains south to the Chilliwack River via Airplane and Foley creeks, and north to the Fraser River via Wahleach Lake and Wahleach Creek. The nearest higher neighbor is "The Still", 1.38 km (1 mi) to the southeast.

== Climbing history ==
The first ascent of the summit was made July 23, 1933, by Bill Dobson and Bill Henderson. Jack Bryan and Jim Craig were first to climb the north face in 1961. The first winter ascent was made by Jack Bryceland and party in 1978.

== Etymology ==
The peak was named in 1923 by Arthur S. Williamson, superintendent of the nearby Lucky Four Mine, to honor the mountaineering experience of Edith Munday (1921–1997), the infant daughter of Don Munday and Phyllis Munday, the well-known Canadian mountaineers. At age two, Edith had already gained mountaineering experience with her parents. The toponym was officially adopted May 30, 1946, by the Geographical Names Board of Canada. Williamson also named nearby Lady Peak in honor of Phyllis.

== Climate ==
Baby Munday Peak is located in the marine west coast climate zone of western North America. Most weather fronts originate in the Pacific Ocean, and travel northeast toward the Cascade Mountains. As fronts approach the North Cascades, they are forced upward by the peaks (Orographic lift), causing them to drop their moisture in the form of rain or snowfall onto the Cascades. As a result, the west side of the North Cascades experiences high precipitation, especially during the winter months in the form of snowfall. Because of maritime influence, snow tends to be wet and heavy, resulting in high avalanche danger. Temperatures in winter can drop below −20 °C with wind chill factors below −30 °C. This climate supports a small glacier in the cirque north of the peak. During winter months, weather is usually cloudy, but due to high pressure systems over the Pacific Ocean that intensify during summer months, there is often little or no cloud cover during the summer. The months July through September offer the most favorable weather for viewing or climbing this peak.

== Geology ==
The North Cascades feature some of the most rugged topography in the Cascade Range with craggy peaks, ridges, and deep glacial valleys. Geological events occurring many years ago created the diverse topography and drastic elevation changes over the Cascade Range leading to various climate differences.

The history of the formation of the Cascade Mountains dates back millions of years ago to the late Eocene Epoch. With the North American Plate overriding the Pacific Plate, episodes of volcanic igneous activity persisted. In addition, small fragments of the oceanic and continental lithosphere called terranes created the North Cascades about 50 million years ago.

During the Pleistocene period dating back over two million years ago, glaciation advancing and retreating repeatedly scoured the landscape leaving deposits of rock debris. The U-shaped cross section of the river valleys is a result of recent glaciation. Uplift and faulting in combination with glaciation have been the dominant processes which have created the tall peaks and deep valleys of the North Cascades area.

== Gallery ==
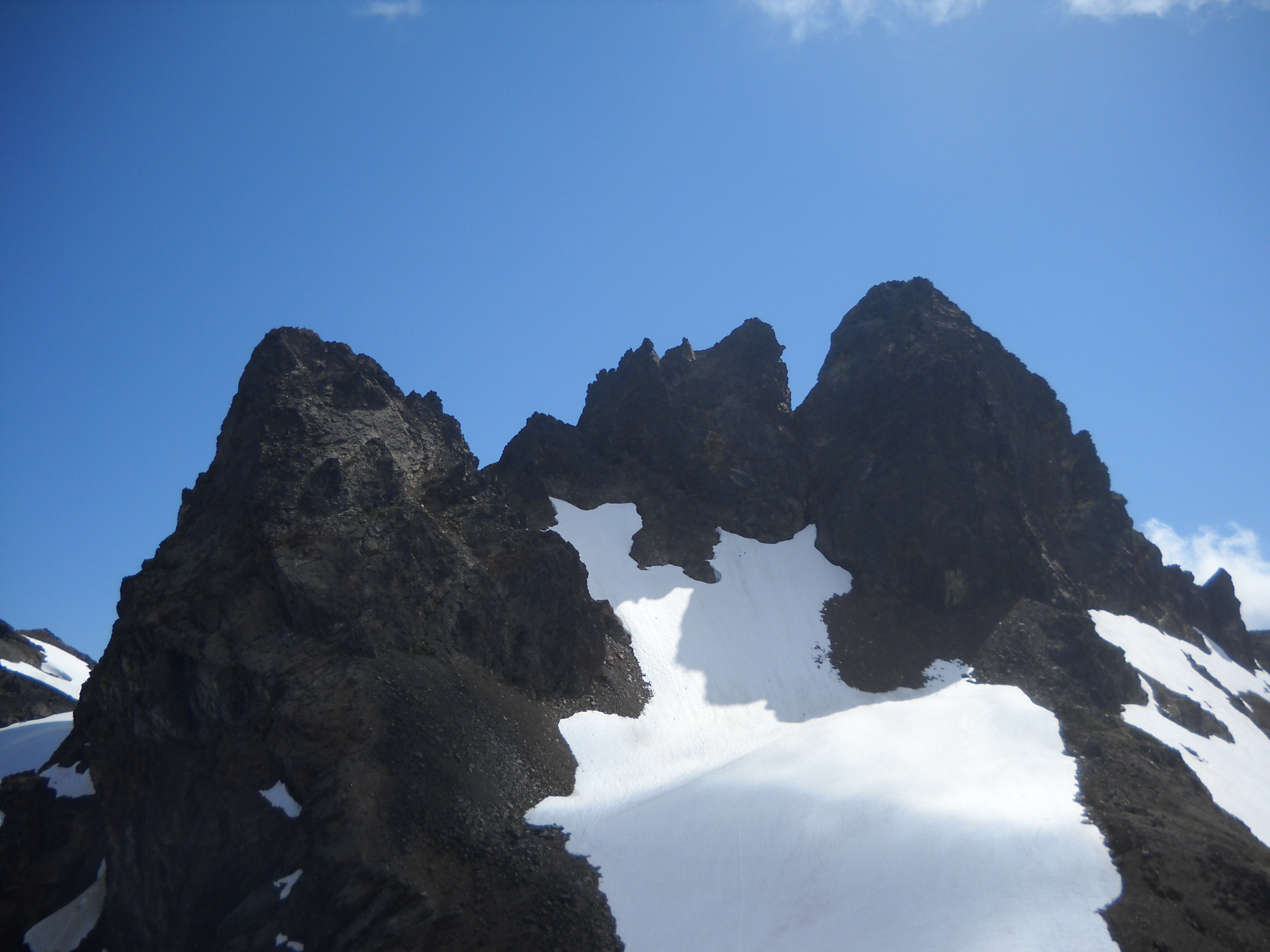
Baby Munday Peak

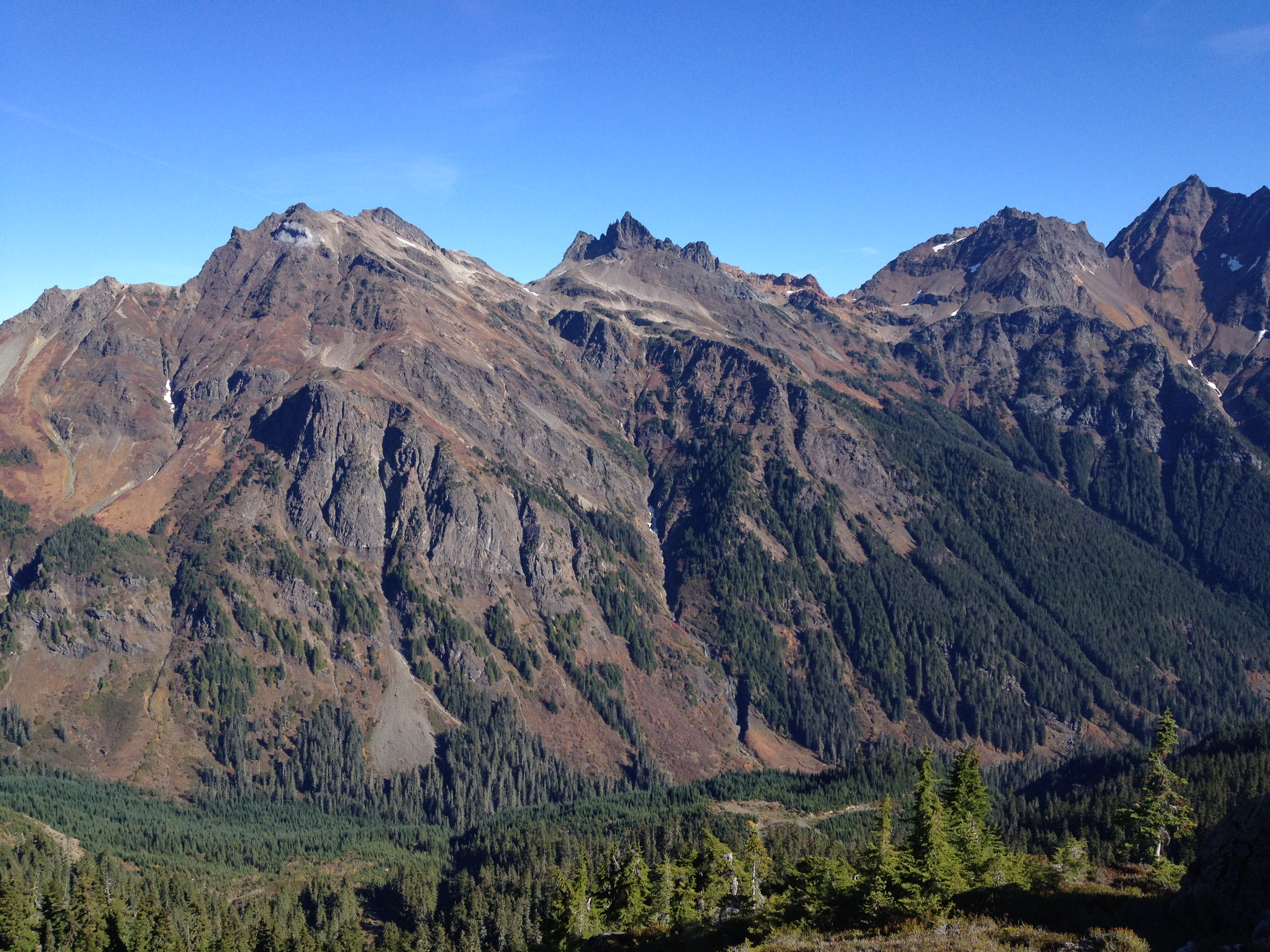
Cheam Range seen from Mt. Laughington. Left to rightː Knight Peak, Baby Munday Peak, The Still, and part of Welch Peak.

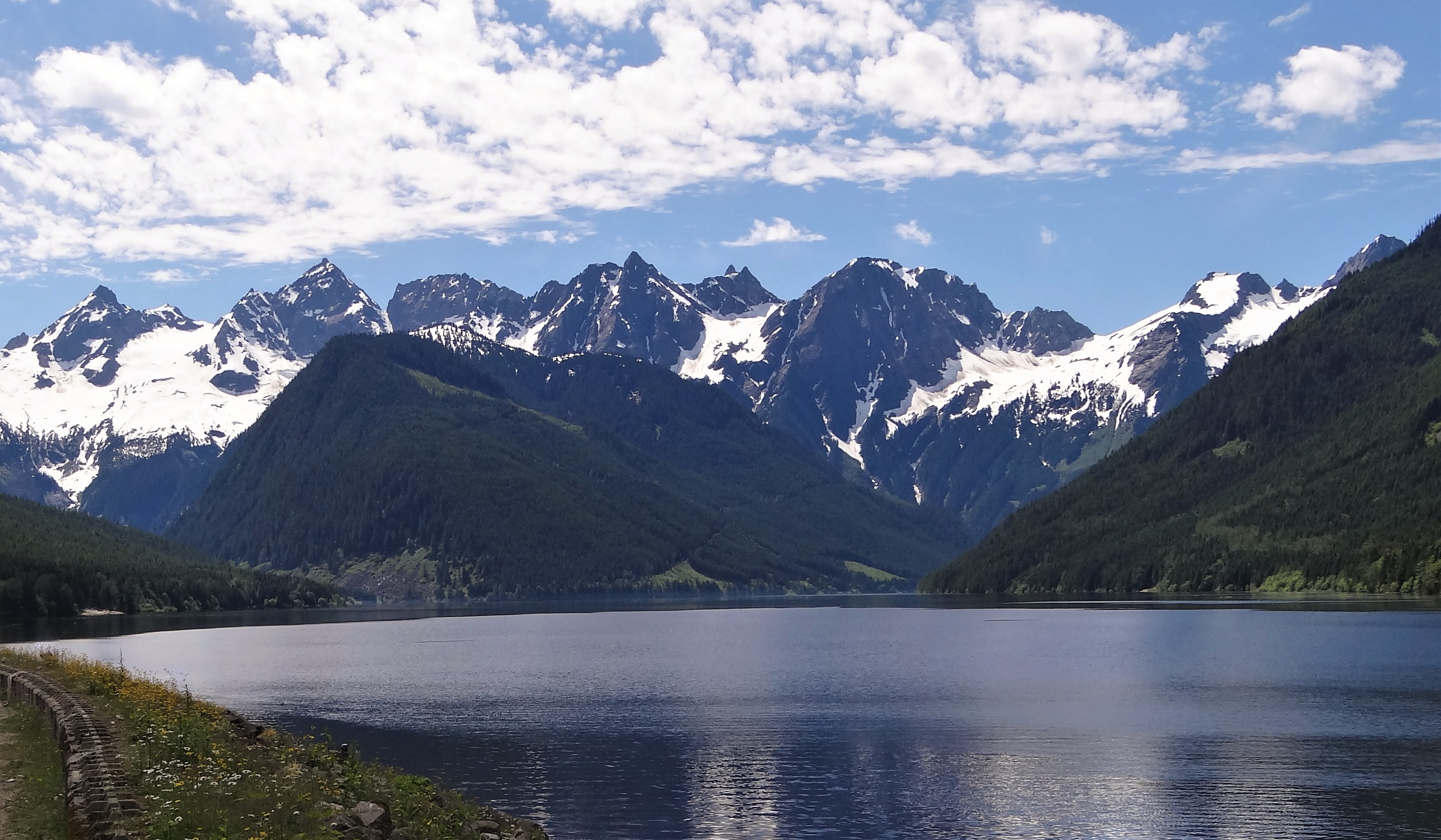
Cheam Range seen from the north at Wahleach Lake.
Baby Munday Peak is a small peak in the center above snow.

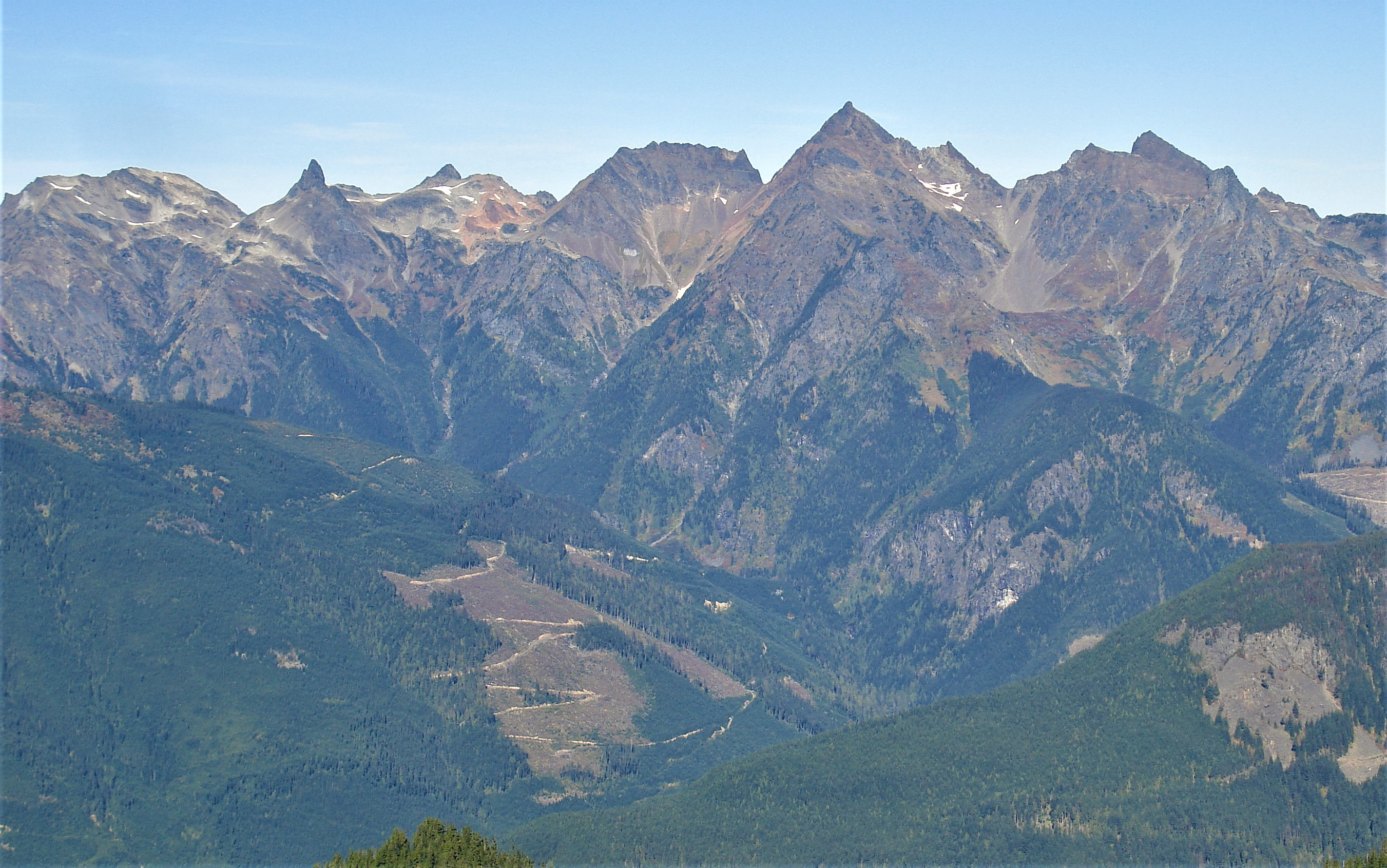
South aspect of Cheam Range. Left to rightː Knight Peak, Baby Munday Peak, Stewart Peak, The Still, Welch Peak, Foley Peak.

== See also ==
- Geography of the North Cascades
- Mount Munday
