= Healy Lake (Vancouver Island) =

- Location within Vancouver Island
- Location: Vancouver Island, British Columbia
- Coordinates: 49°08′00″N 124°19′00″W
- Lake type: Natural lake
- Basin countries: Canada

Healy Lake is a lake located on Vancouver Island that is an expansion of South Englishman River.

== Fishing ==
Natural populations of Rainbow Trout are found in Healy Lake.

== See also ==
- List of lakes of British Columbia
