= Arrowsmith Lake =

- Location within Vancouver Island
- Location: Vancouver Island, British Columbia
- Coordinates: 49°13′04″N 124°32′38″W
- Lake type: Natural lake
- Basin countries: Canada

Arrowsmith Lake is a lake located on Vancouver Island east of Mount Arrowsmith.

== Access ==
Drive to the northwest bay gate, up the 155 main for 21 km (13 mi) bridge over Englishman river; up another 8.6 km (5.3 mi); left to lake and dam (note that there is a gate here and it may be locked); another 1 km (0.62 mi) from the gate.

== See also ==
- List of lakes of British Columbia
