= Rhododendron Lake =

- Location within Vancouver Island
- Location: Vancouver Island, British Columbia
- Coordinates: 49°11′00″N 124°17′00″W
- Lake type: Natural lake
- Basin countries: Canada

Rhododendron Lake is a lake located on Vancouver Island, Canada, east of South Englishman River and north west of Nanaimo Lakes. Adjacent to the lake is a small grove of Pacific Rhododendron which is a rare plant on Vancouver Island.

== Fishing ==
Wild populations of native coastal cutthroat trout are found in Rhododendron Lake.

== See also ==
- List of lakes of British Columbia
