= Mount Munday =

Mountain in British Columbia, Canada

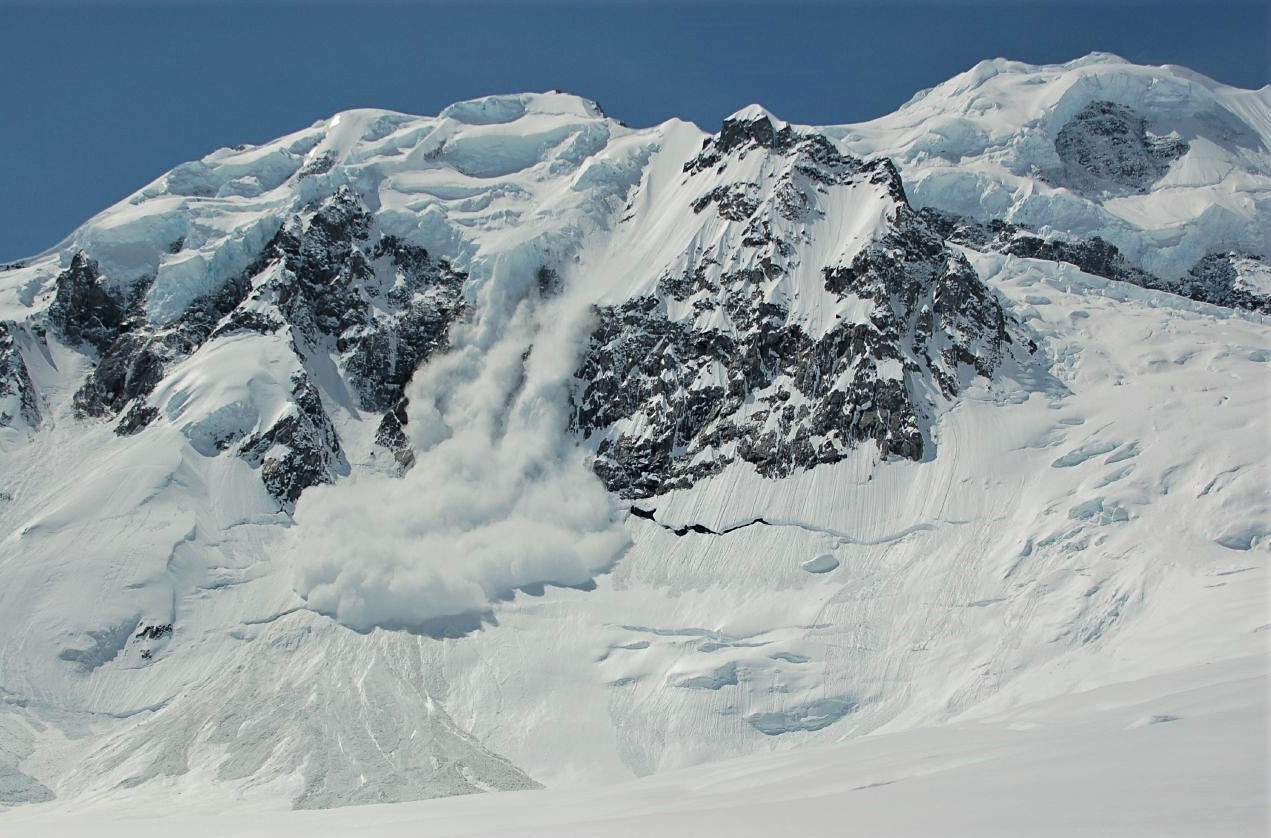
- North aspect

Highest point
- Elevation: 3,356 m (11,010 ft)
- Prominence: 426 m (1,398 ft)
- Listing: Mountains of British Columbia
- Coordinates: 51°19′43″N 125°12′58″W

Geography
- Location within British Columbia
- Interactive map of Mount Munday
- Location: British Columbia, Canada
- Parent range: Waddington Range; Pacific Ranges
- Topo map: NTS 92N6 Mount Waddington

Climbing
- First ascent: 1930 D. Munday & P. Munday
- Easiest route: rock/ice climb

Mount Munday is one of the principal summits of the Pacific Ranges of the Coast Mountains in British Columbia, Canada. It is 3,356 m (11,010 ft) in elevation and stands in the Waddington Range six kilometres southeast of Mount Waddington 4,019 m (13,186 ft), which is the highest summit in the Coast Mountains.

The peak was named in honour of pioneering climbers Don and Phyllis Munday who first climbed it explored and charted much of the southern Coast Mountains, including much of western Garibaldi Provincial Park near Whistler but also many remote peaks lesser-known than those near the resort. The Mundays were the discoverers of Mount Waddington, formerly dubbed by them Mystery Mountain; they originally spotted it from Mount Arrowsmith on Vancouver Island but explored the Waddington Range in the hope of locating and measuring it, although someone else performed its first ascent.

== Climate ==
Based on the Köppen climate classification, Mount Munday has an ice cap climate. Most weather fronts originate in the Pacific Ocean, and travel east toward the Coast Mountains where they are forced upward by the range (Orographic lift), causing them to drop their moisture in the form of rain or snowfall. As a result, the Coast Mountains experience high precipitation, especially during the winter months in the form of snowfall. Temperatures can drop below −20 °C with wind chill factors below −30 °C. This climate supports the Bravo, Splendour and Ice Valley glaciers which cover the slopes of Mount Munday.

== See also ==
- Baby Munday Peak
