= Shelton Lake =

- Location within Vancouver Island
- Location: Vancouver Island, British Columbia
- Coordinates: 49°07′00″N 124°19′00″W
- Lake type: Natural lake
- Basin countries: Canada

Shelton Lake is a lake located on Vancouver Island at the head of South Englishman River north west of Nanaimo Lakes.

== Fishing ==
Wild populations of native coastal cutthroat trout are found in Shelton Lake.

== See also ==
- List of lakes of British Columbia
