= Hidden Lake (Vancouver Island) =

- Location within Vancouver Island
- Location: Vancouver Island, British Columbia
- Coordinates: 49°13′00″N 124°34′00″W
- Lake type: Natural lake
- Basin countries: Canada

Hidden Lake is a lake located on Vancouver Island east of Mount Arrowsmith.

== Fishing ==
Wild populations of native coastal cutthroat trout are found in Hidden Lake. Hidden Lake is stocked annually with rainbow trout.

== See also ==
- List of lakes of British Columbia
