= Fish Brewing Company =

- Industry: Alcoholic beverage
- Founded: 1993
- Headquarters: Olympia, Washington United States
- Products: Beer, Cider

Fish Brewing Company is a brewery in Olympia, Washington, USA. Its products are distributed under the brands Fish Tale Ales, Leavenworth Beers and Spire Mountain Cider in the Pacific Northwest states of Alaska, Idaho, Oregon and Washington.

They are currently in receivership as a result of an inability to pay vendors. They carry 4.8 million in debt with 2.6 million in assets. In December 2019, the company was sold to Josh Carrigan and Kate Craig.
