= Fishtail Lake =

- Location within Vancouver Island
- Location: Vancouver Island, British Columbia
- Coordinates: 49°13′34.8″N 124°34′04.8″W
- Lake type: Natural lake
- Basin countries: Canada

Fishtail Lake is a lake located on Vancouver Island east of Mount Arrowsmith.

== See also ==
- List of lakes of British Columbia
