= Stewart Peak (British Columbia) =

Mountain in British Columbia, Canada

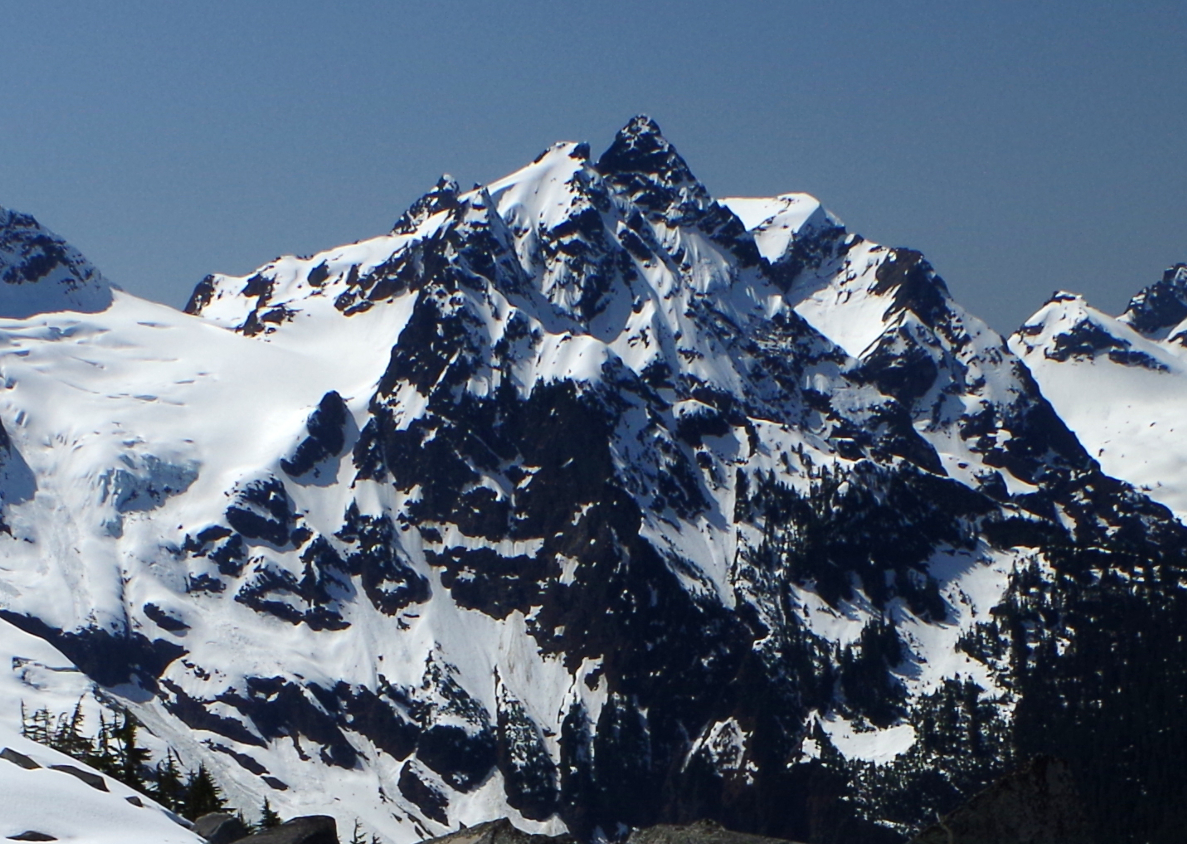

Highest point
- Elevation: 2,238 m (7,343 ft)
- Prominence: 118 m (387 ft)
- Coordinates: 49°10′15″N 121°36′42″W

Geography
- Location within British Columbia Location within Canada
- Interactive map of Stewart Peak
- Location: British Columbia, Canada
- District: Yale Division Yale Land District
- Parent range: North Cascades
- Topo map: NTS 92H4 Chilliwack

Climbing
- First ascent: 1884 by E. Knight, D. Walker
- Easiest route: Scrambling via south side

Stewart Peak is a 2,238-metre (7,343-foot) mountain in the Cheam Range, located in southwestern British Columbia, Canada near Chilliwack. It is situated west of The Still Peak and east of Baby Munday Peak. The mountain is named after one of the partners in the engineering firm Foley, Welch and Stewart who built and operated the Lucky Four Mine located near the peak. Nearby peaks are also named after the other partners (Foley Peak and Welch Peak).

== Geology ==
The history of the formation of the Cascade Mountains dates back millions of years ago to the late Eocene Epoch. With the North American Plate overriding the Pacific Plate, episodes of volcanic igneous activity persisted. In addition, small fragments of the oceanic and continental lithosphere called terranes created the North Cascades about 50 million years ago.

During the Pleistocene period dating back over two million years ago, glaciation advancing and retreating repeatedly scoured the landscape leaving deposits of rock debris. The U-shaped cross section of the river valleys is a result of recent glaciation. Uplift and faulting in combination with glaciation have been the dominant processes which have created the tall peaks and deep valleys of the North Cascades area.

The North Cascades features some of the most rugged topography in the Cascade Range with craggy peaks, granite spires, ridges, and deep glacial valleys. Geological events occurring many years ago created the diverse topography and drastic elevation changes over the Cascade Range leading to various climate differences.

== Climate ==
Most weather fronts originate in the Pacific Ocean, and travel east toward the Cascade Mountains. As fronts approach the North Cascades, they are forced upward by the peaks of the Cascade Range, causing them to drop their moisture in the form of rain or snowfall onto the Cascades (Orographic lift). As a result, the west side of the North Cascades experiences higher precipitation than the east side, especially during the winter months in the form of snowfall. During winter months, weather is usually cloudy, but, due to high pressure systems over the Pacific Ocean that intensify during summer months, there is often little or no cloud cover during the summer.

== See also ==
- Geography of the North Cascades
- Canadian Cascade Arc
