= Cheam Range =

Mountain range in British Columbia, Canada

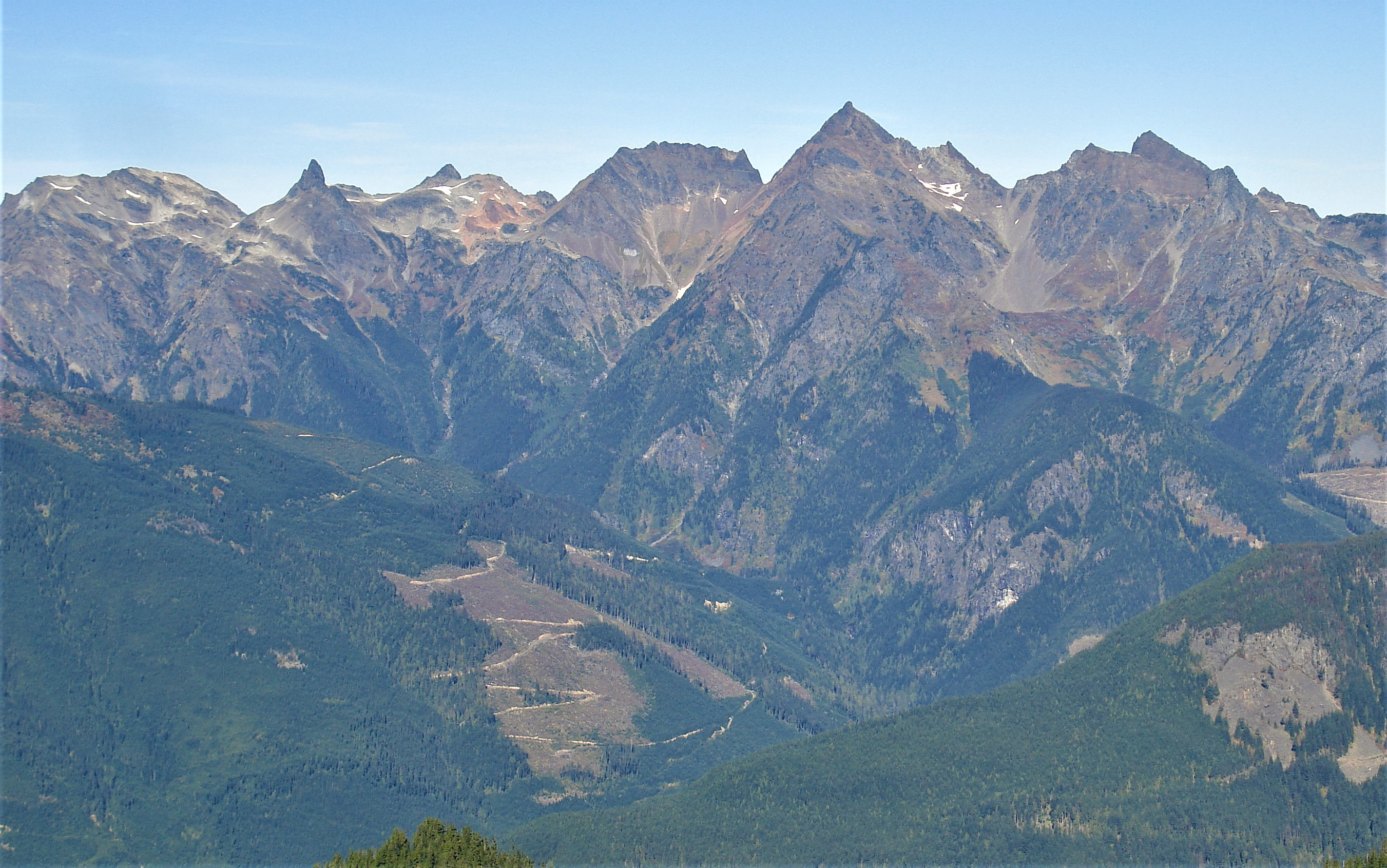
- South aspect of Cheam Range. Left to rightː Knight Peak, Baby Munday Peak, Stewart Peak, The Still, Welch Peak, Foley Peak.

Highest point
- Peak: Welch Peak
- Elevation: 2,431 m (7,976 ft)
- Coordinates: 49°09′36″N 121°36′03″W

Dimensions
- Area: 112 km^{2} (43 mi^{2})

Geography
- Location within British Columbia
- Country: Canada
- Province: British Columbia
- District: Yale Division Yale Land District
- City: Chilliwack
- Range coordinates: 49°10′18″N 121°39′27″W
- Parent range: Skagit Range, Canadian Cascades
- Topo map: NTS 92H4 Chilliwack

The Cheam Range (pronounced /ʃiːˈæm/ or /ʃiːˈɛm/) is a mountain range in the Fraser Valley region of the Lower Mainland of British Columbia near the city of Chilliwack. The region is also a part of the Skagit Range of the Canadian Cascades and contains many rugged peaks.

The western peaks in the range—Cheam, Lady, Baby Munday and Stewart—are known in areas of the Fraser Valley where they are visible, as the "Four Sisters". The eastern peaks in the range are referred to as the Lucky Four Group because of their proximity to the abandoned Lucky Four Mine; the glacier in the cirque formed by Welch and Foley is called the Lucky Four Glacier. Foley, Welch and Stewart commemorate partners in Foley, Welch and Stewart, an important contractor in early British Columbia responsible for building the Pacific Great Eastern Railway and other projects.

The highest point is the Welch Peak.

== Peaks ==
- Cheam Peak
- Lady Peak
- Knight Peak
- Baby Munday Peak
- Stewart Peak
- The Still
- Welch Peak
- Foley Peak

== Gallery ==
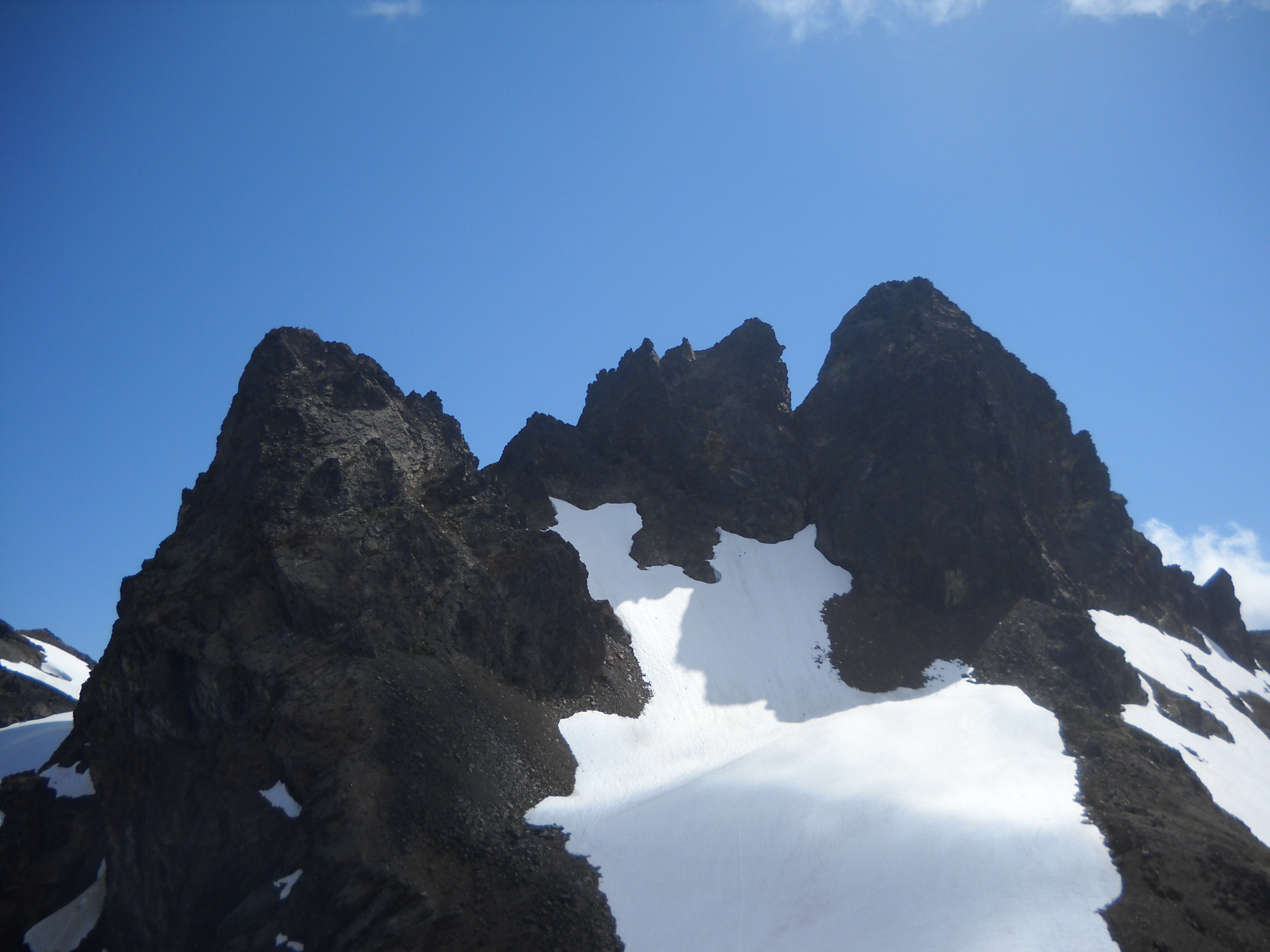
Baby Munday Peak, seen from near the summit of Knight Peak
