= Wahleach Lake =

Jones Lakes Wahleach Lake
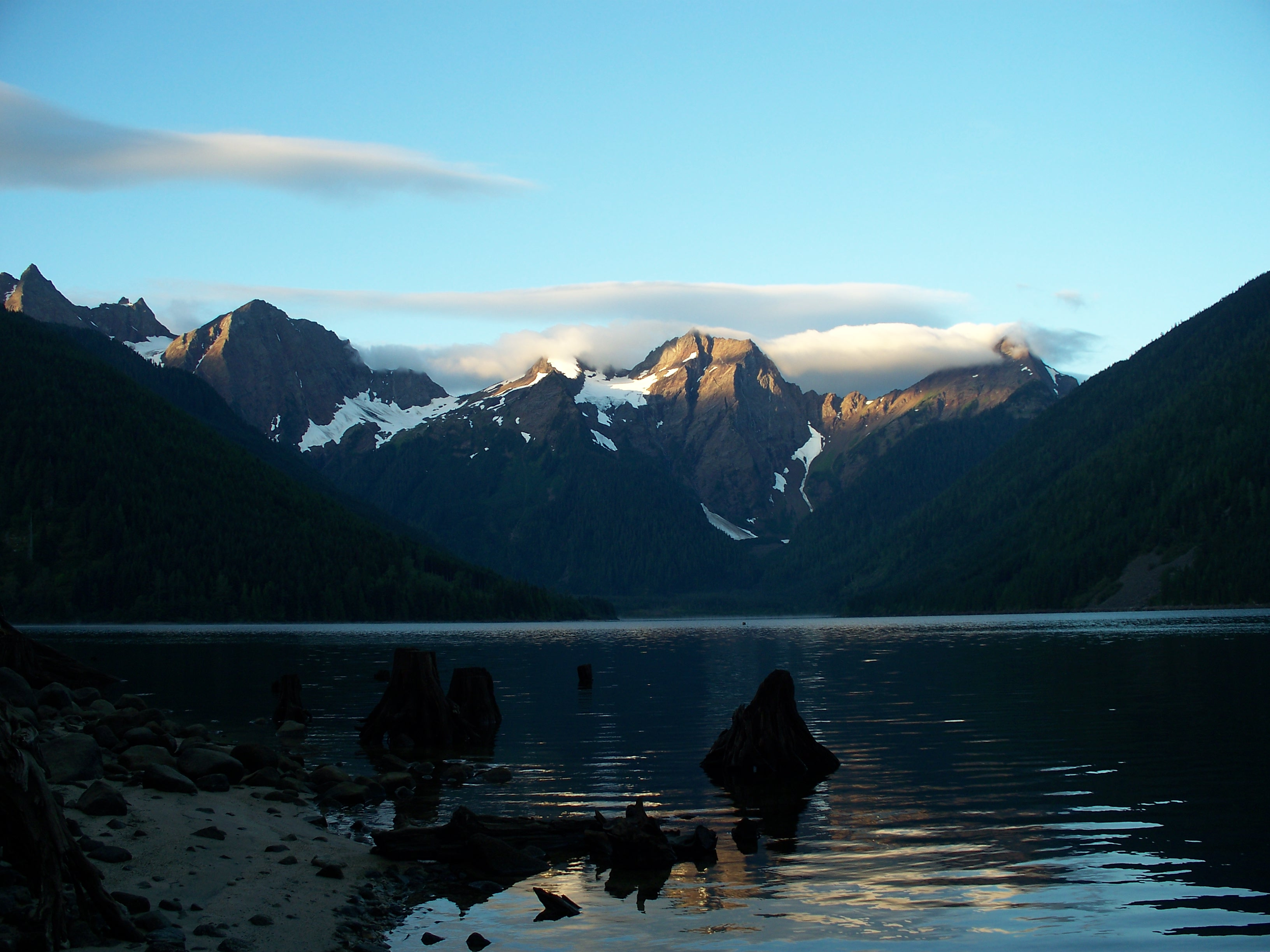
- Jones (Wahleach) Lake, September 2012

- Location within British Columbia
- Location: British Columbia
- Coordinates: 49°14′N 121°37′W
- Type: natural lake, reservoir
- Basin countries: Canada

Wahleach Lake, commonly known as Jones Lake, is a lake and reservoir located in the Skagit Range in the Lower Mainland of British Columbia, Canada, east of the city of Chilliwack and southwest of the town of Hope.

The lake, which was a resting place for Sto:lo people on their way to summer hunting grounds, was expanded by an earthfill dam and is now 6.4 km long and 1 km wide. At over 600 m above the level of the Fraser River, nearly all of its volume is diverted through the side of a flank of Mount Cheam, part of the Four Brothers Range, to the Wahleach Powerhouse which stands beside the Trans-Canada Highway east of Bridal Falls. When the Wahleach development was completed in 1952 it produced 14% of the power for the BC Electric Company, a predecessor to BC Hydro and a subsidiary of the British Columbia Electric Railway Company. As of 2008, it produces less than 1% of BC Hydro's generating capacity but is ranked as one of the company's most efficient operations. In addition to a private-run recreational cabin operation, there are three campgrounds operated by BC Hydro as part of its recreation areas program, with approximately 60 campsites in three different campgrounds.

== Name ==
The name Jones Lake first appeared on a map in 1904 and is the main name used locally, as well as appearing on the highway signs for the Jones Lake Forest Service Road, which is the only access. The dual naming also applies to Wahleach Creek, which is also known as Jones Creek.

The name Wahleach, which also occurs as the name of an island and associated Indian reserve on the other side of the Fraser, and as Waleach as a railway point on the CPR on Sea Bird Island, is that of a Sto:lo resident from Union Bar, near Hope, whose anglicized and baptized name was Camille Walecia but whose name in Halq'eméylem is spelled "Xwelích", meaning "crossing a neck of land between two bodies of water" [i.e. portage].

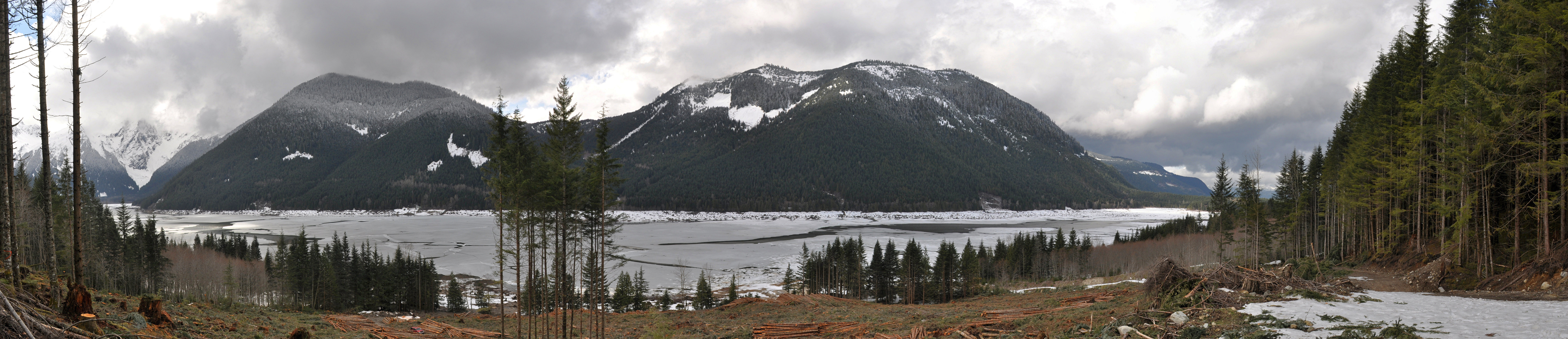

== See also ==
- List of lakes of British Columbia
