= Cheam Peak =

Mountain in British Columbia, Canada

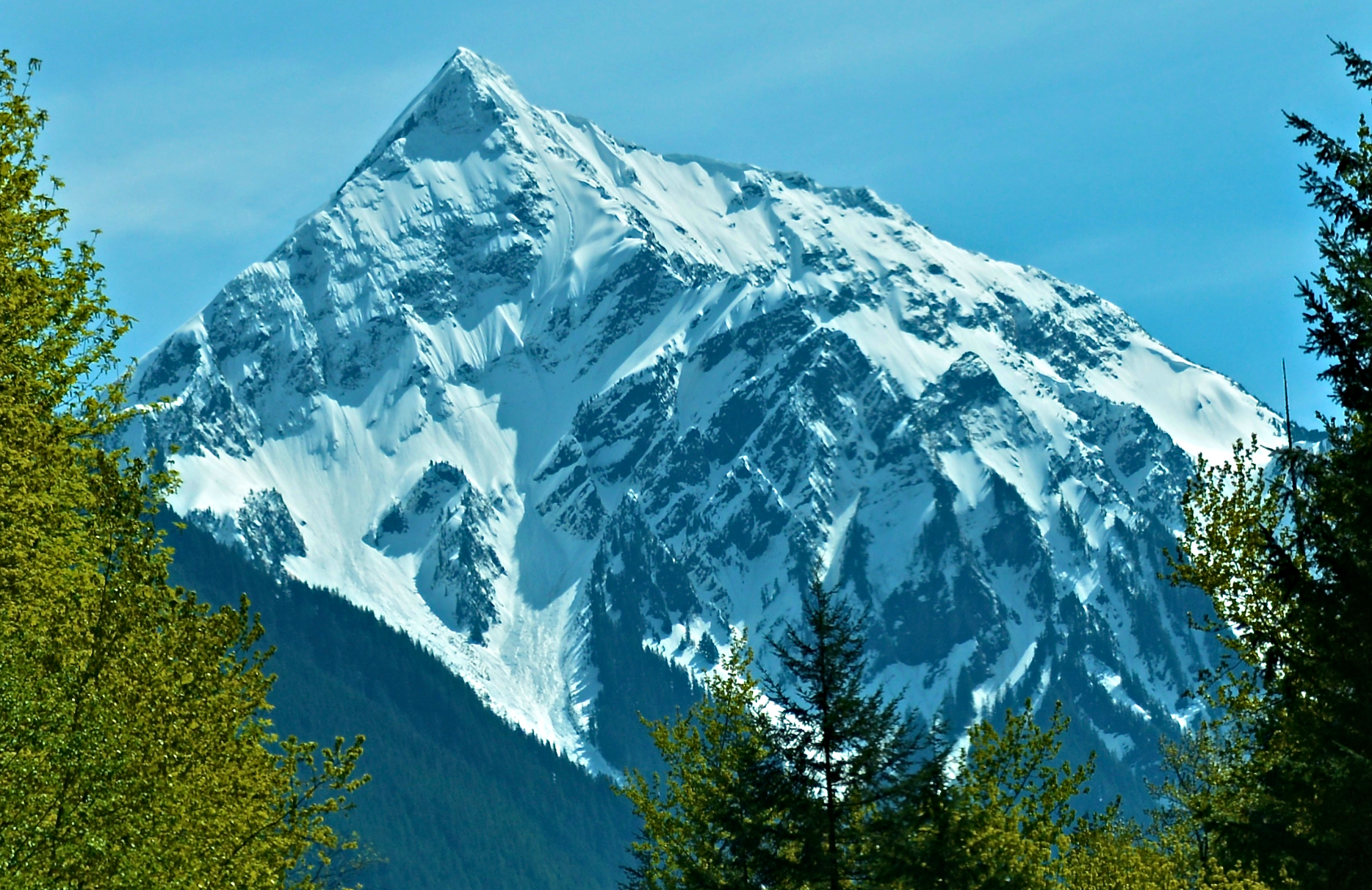
- Cheam Peak

Highest point
- Elevation: 2,104 m (6,903 ft)
- Prominence: 334 m (1,096 ft)
- Coordinates: 49°11′12″N 121°40′54″W

Geography
- Location within British Columbia Location within Canada
- Interactive map of Cheam Peak
- Location: British Columbia, Canada
- District: Yale Division Yale Land District
- Parent range: North Cascades
- Topo map: NTS 92H4 Chilliwack

Climbing
- First ascent: 1888 A. O. Campbell, Ebe B. Knight and party; probably ascended earlier by the local Indigenous peoples
- Easiest route: Southwest Route (3.8 km trail with 632m elevation gain)

Cheam Peak or Mount Cheam (English: /ʃɛm/ and /ˈʃiːæm/; Halkomelem: [ˈʃiːəm], the local indigenous language, referring to the lowland below. The Halqemeylem name for the mountain is Lhílheqey – Theeth-uhl-kay – from the word Lhelqey – "glacier" or "rehydrate", referring to the west ridge of the peak) is a mountain in British Columbia, Canada.

== Description ==
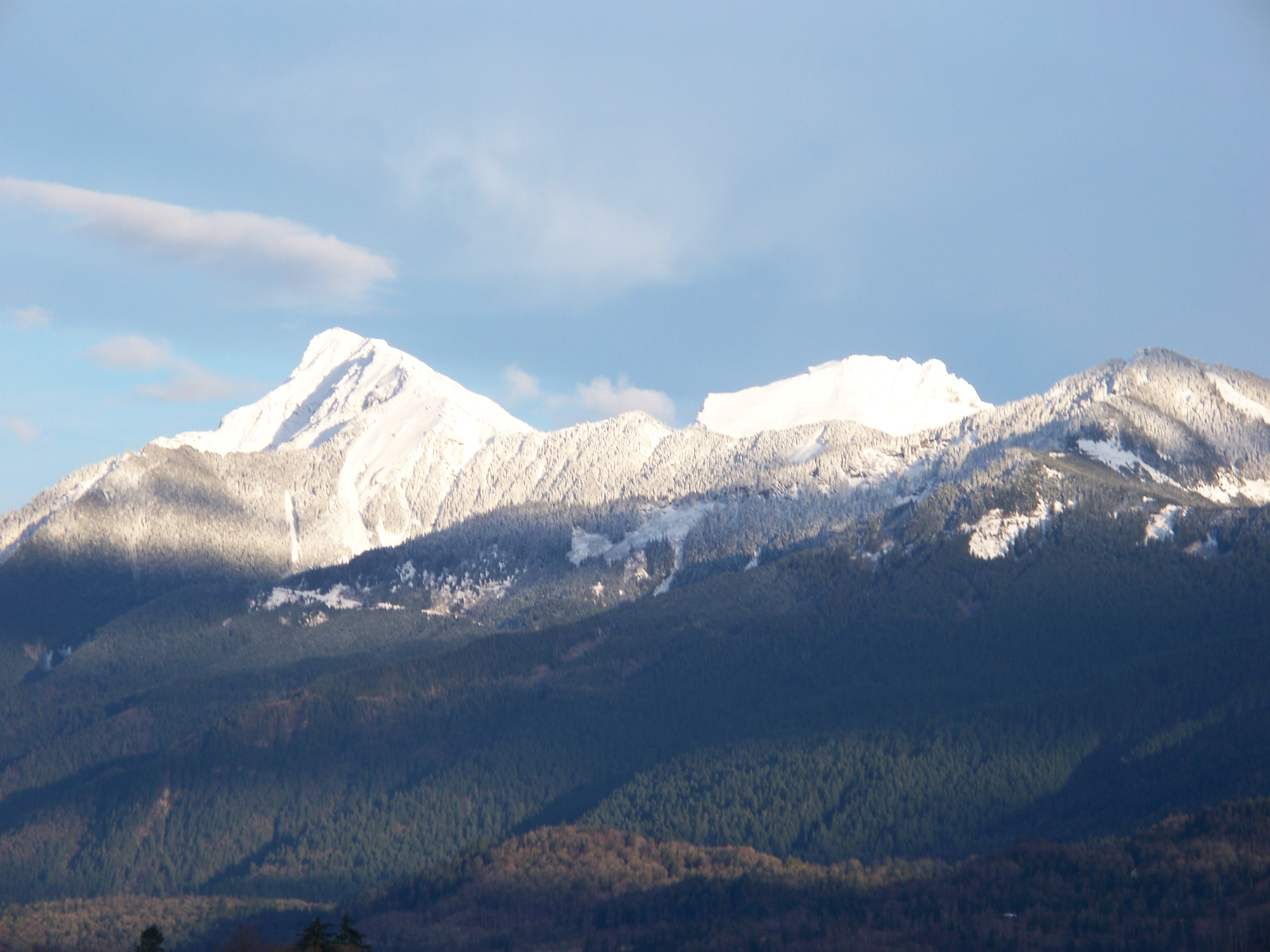
Mount Cheam in January as seen from the Fraser Valley

Cheam's structure is pyramidal, with north, northwest, south and east faces. While the north face is the steepest, the northwest face is also sheer. A prominent spur ending in the sub peak called "Red Pyramid" or "Red Tower" (1,400 m (4,593 ft)) divides the two northern faces. The western ridge divides the northwest and south faces; below the gently sloping south face is the subalpine bowl of Spoon Lake. The southeast ridge ascends from the col with Lady Peak, two km to the southeast; Jones Lake is below the east face. A sharp ridge divides the east and north faces.

Cheam is the farthest northerly peak of a small group of peaks known as the Cheam Range, which form a subrange of the Skagit Range of the Canadian Cascades mountains (which are the Canadian extension of the North Cascades of Washington). It dominates the eastern Fraser Valley, rising above Bridal Falls and Agassiz just east of Chilliwack, British Columbia. It and three sister peaks form a group known as the Four Sisters or Four Brothers, which are part of the mountain wall framing the Lower Mainland; though visible from as far away as Vancouver Island on a clear day, like Cheam does for the Eastern Valley, they are a dominant part of the mountain skyline of Mission and the communities of Hatzic, Dewdney and Deroche. Behind them is Wahleach Lake, which begins at the east foot of Cheam and lies in a high-altitude valley ringed by the Cheam Range. The far east ridge of Cheam is not alpine and is heavily forested and is pierced by the BC Hydro diversion tunnel to Wahleach Powerhouse, which is in the area of the Trans-Canada Highway that Cheam first becomes visible coming from the east. A few miles east along the highway the highway's course diverts around the foot of another mountain.

== History ==
Cheam Peak was part of the oral history of the Sto:lo peoples. The Halkomelem name for the peak, Theeth-uhl-kay, means "the source" or "the place from which the waters spring." For the Sto:lo, the peak is the "mother mountain" or old woman overlooking her children dwelling in the valley. Lady Peak, to the south is the old woman's dog. Cheam, the official name of the peak, is said to be the Halkomelem word for "wild strawberries," though the British Columbia Geographical Names Office description says that name is a reference to the lowland below. This describes the ridge that includes Cheam and Lady Peaks, and the lower slopes around Spoon Lake and upper Airplane Creek.

The first recorded ascent of the mountain was in 1888 by A. O. Campbell, Ebe B. Knight and party.

== Climbing history ==
The north face, plunging 2,000 m (6,562 ft) to the valley floor, has rarely been climbed. However, an easy trail provides access to the summit from a subalpine bowl to the southwest.

== Hiking ==
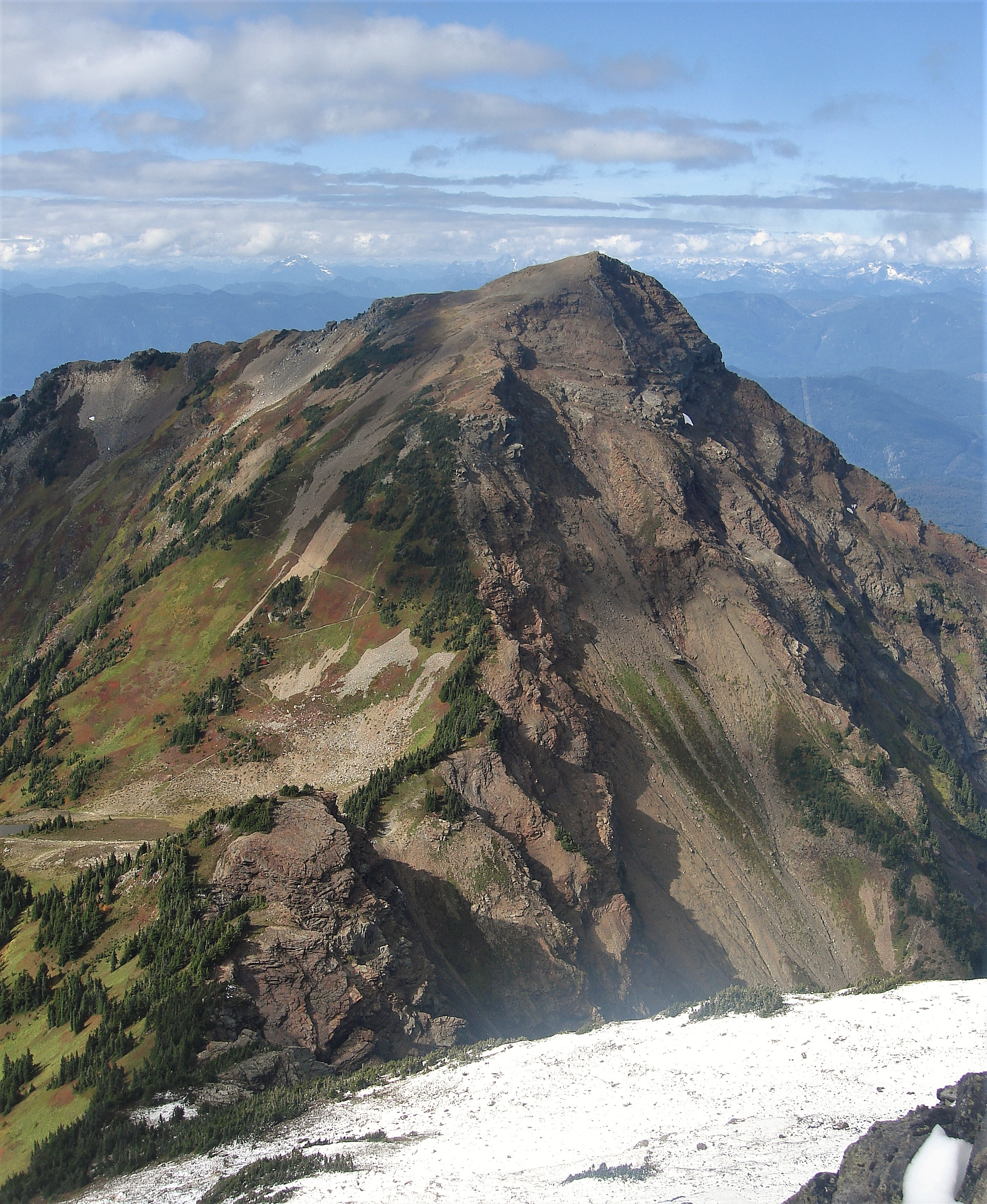
Mount Cheam as seen from Lady Peak

The trailhead to Cheam Peak, is via decommissioned logging roads accessible from Chilliwack Lake Road on the south side of Cheam. Access without a four-wheel drive vehicle is difficult but possible. From the trailhead, a 3.8 km (2 mi) trail leads through subalpine meadows and then ascends, moderately steeply, 632 m (2,073 ft) to the peak. The summit offers views of the Fraser Valley to the north and west and of the Cheam Range and North Cascade mountains to the south.

One can also access Lady Peak via a route that begins about halfway up the Cheam Peak Trail.

== Climate ==
Based on the Köppen climate classification, Cheam Peak is located in the marine west coast climate zone of western North America. Most weather fronts originate in the Pacific Ocean, and travel east toward the Cascade Range where they are forced upward by the range (Orographic lift), causing them to drop their moisture in the form of rain or snowfall. As a result, the Cascade Mountains experience high precipitation, especially during the winter months in the form of snowfall. Temperatures can drop below −20 °C (−4 °F) with wind chill factors below −30 °C (−22 °F). The months July through September offer the most favorable weather for climbing Cheam Peak.
