= Welch Peak =

Mountain in British Columbia, Canada

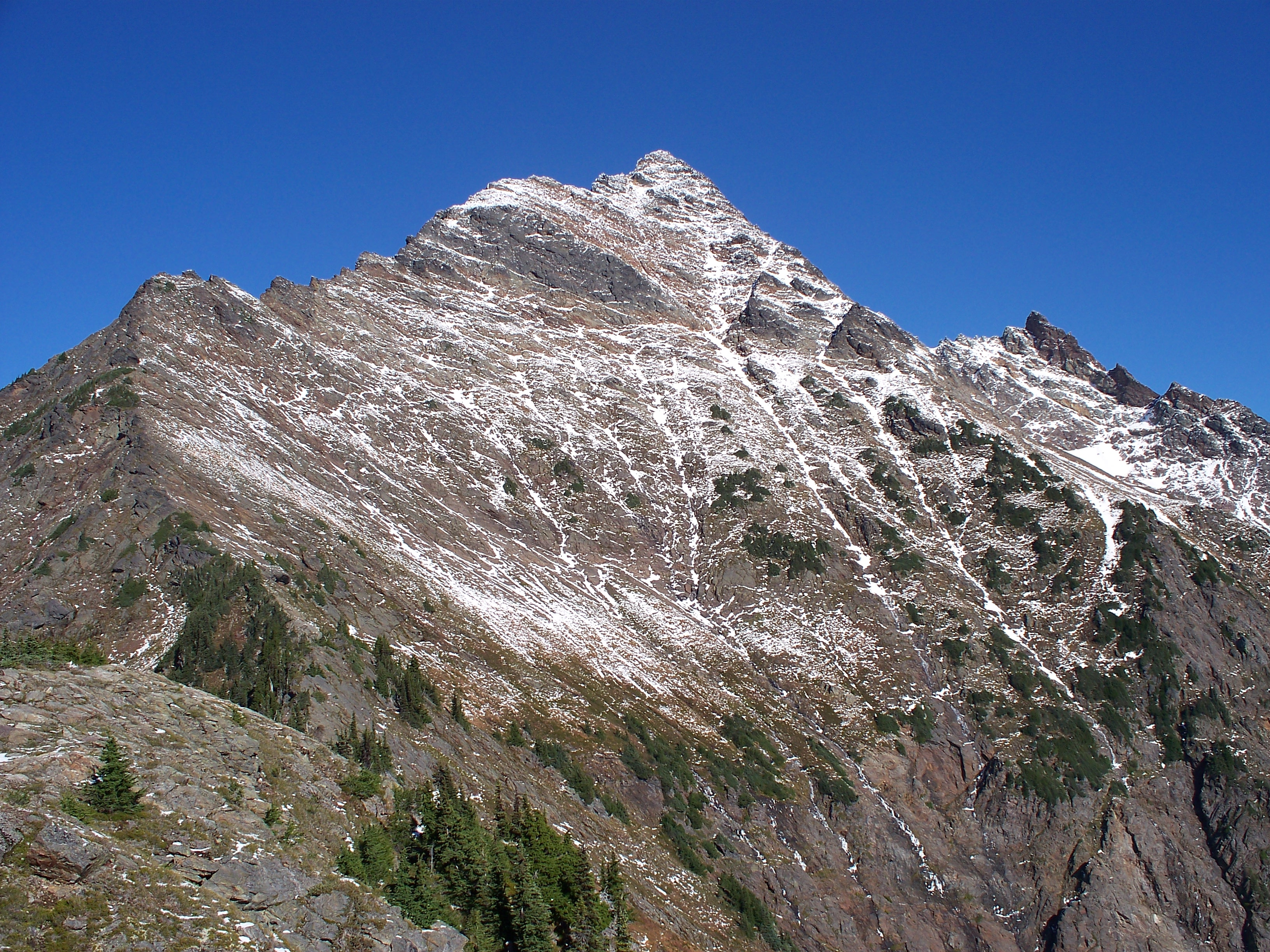
- Welch Peak in October 2008

Highest point
- Elevation: 2,431 m (7,976 ft)
- Prominence: 1,441 m (4,728 ft)
- Listing: Mountains of British Columbia
- Coordinates: 49°09′36″N 121°36′03″W

Geography
- Location within British Columbia Location within Canada
- Interactive map of Welch Peak
- Location: Fraser Valley, British Columbia, Canada
- District: Yale Division Yale Land District
- Parent range: Cheam Range
- Topo map: NTS 92H4 Chilliwack

Climbing
- First ascent: 1924 by A. Cooper, F. Smith, and F. Spouse

Welch Peak is a 2,431-metre (7,976-foot) mountain summit in the Cheam Range, located in southwestern British Columbia, Canada, near Chilliwack. It is the highest summit in the range. The mountain is named after one of the partners in the engineering firm Foley, Welch and Stewart who built and operated the Lucky Four Mine located near the peak. Nearby peaks are also named after the other partners (Foley Peak and Stewart Peak).

== Geology ==
Welch Peak is related to the Chilliwack batholith, which intruded the region 26 to 29 million years ago after the major orogenic episodes in the region. This is part of the Pemberton Volcanic Belt, an eroded volcanic belt that formed as a result of subduction of the Farallon Plate starting 29 million years ago.

During the Pleistocene period dating back over two million years ago, glaciation advancing and retreating repeatedly scoured the landscape leaving deposits of rock debris. The U-shaped cross section of the river valleys is a result of recent glaciation. Uplift and faulting in combination with glaciation have been the dominant processes which have created the tall peaks and deep valleys of the North Cascades area.

The North Cascades features some of the most rugged topography in the Cascade Range with craggy peaks and ridges, deep glacial valleys, and granite spires.

Geological events occurring many years ago created the diverse topography and drastic elevation changes over the Cascade Range leading to various climate differences which lead to vegetation variety defining the ecoregions in this area.

== Climate ==
Based on the Köppen climate classification, Welch Peak is located in the marine west coast climate zone of western North America. Most weather fronts originate in the Pacific Ocean, and travel east toward the Cascade Range where they are forced upward by the range (Orographic lift), causing them to drop their moisture in the form of rain or snowfall. As a result, the Cascade Mountains experience high precipitation, especially during the winter months in the form of snowfall. Temperatures can drop below −20 °C with wind chill factors below −30 °C. The months July through September offer the most favorable weather for climbing Welch Peak.

== Gallery ==
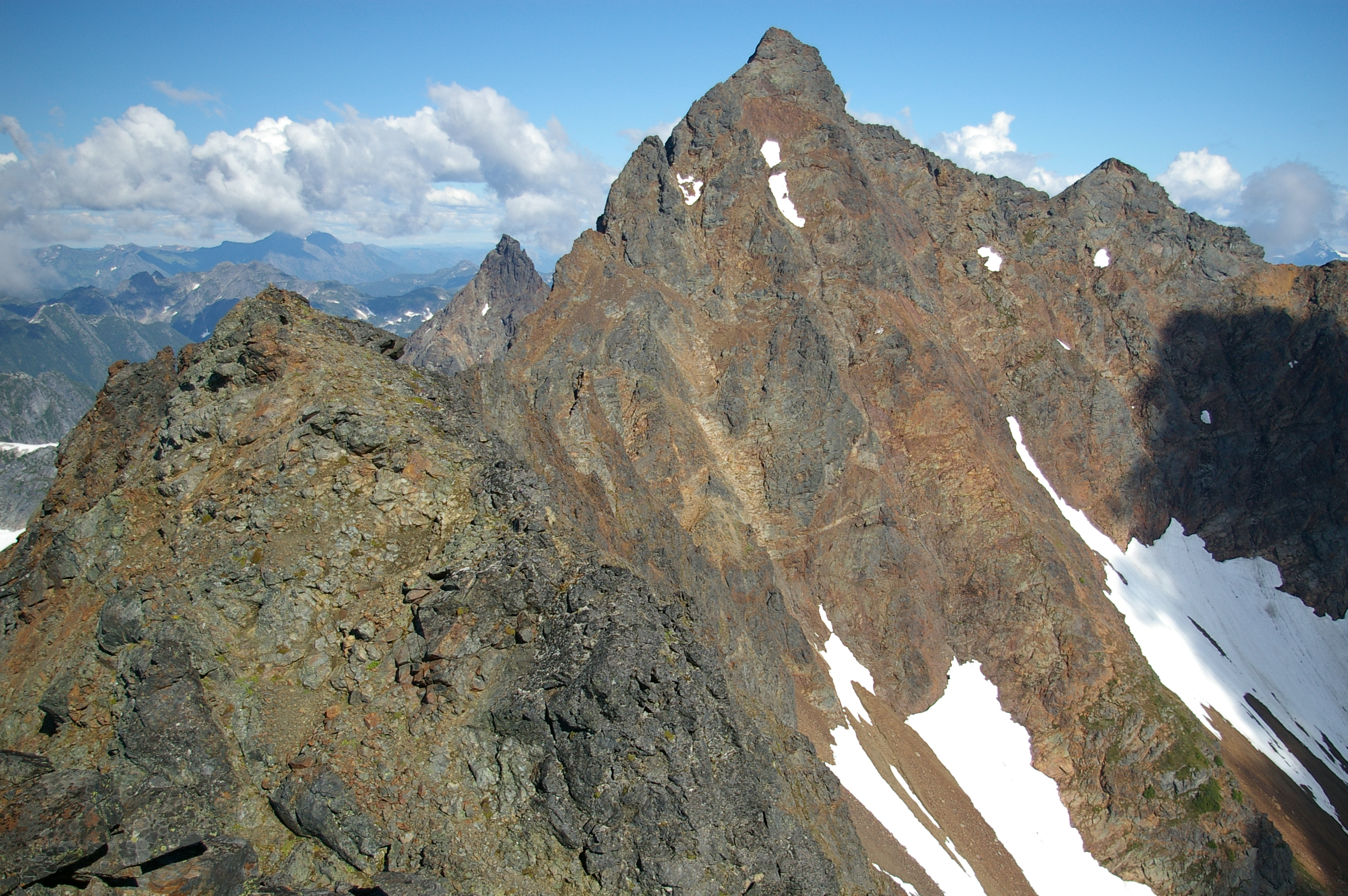
Welch Peak

== See also ==
- Geography of the North Cascades
- Geology of British Columbia
