= Foley Peak =

Mountain in British Columbia, Canada

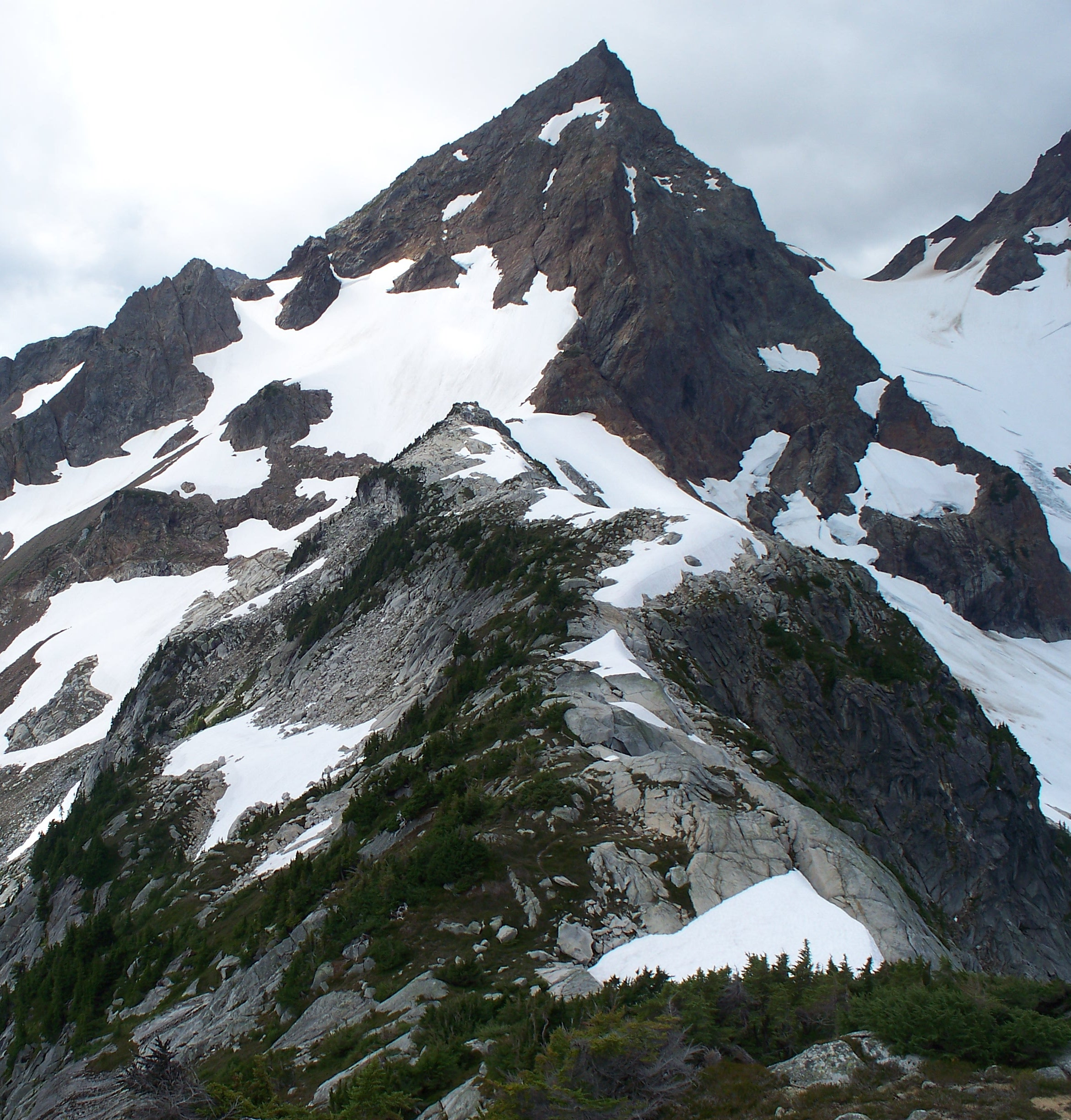
- East side of Foley Peak (September 2012)

Highest point
- Elevation: 2,293 m (7,523 ft)
- Prominence: 203 m (666 ft)
- Coordinates: 49°09′36″N 121°35′06″W

Geography
- Location within British Columbia
- Location: British Columbia, Canada
- District: Yale Division Yale Land District
- Parent range: North Cascades
- Topo map: NTS 92H4 Chilliwack

Foley Peak is a mountain in the Cheam Range, located in southwestern British Columbia, Canada near Chilliwack. It is one of the easternmost peaks in the range, situated west of Conway Peak and east of Welch Peak. The mountain is named after one of the partners in the engineering firm Foley, Welch and Stewart who built and operated the Lucky Four Mine located near the peak. Nearby peaks are also named after the other partners (Stewart Peak and Welch Peak).
