= Mount Arrowsmith =

Mountain in British Columbia, Canada

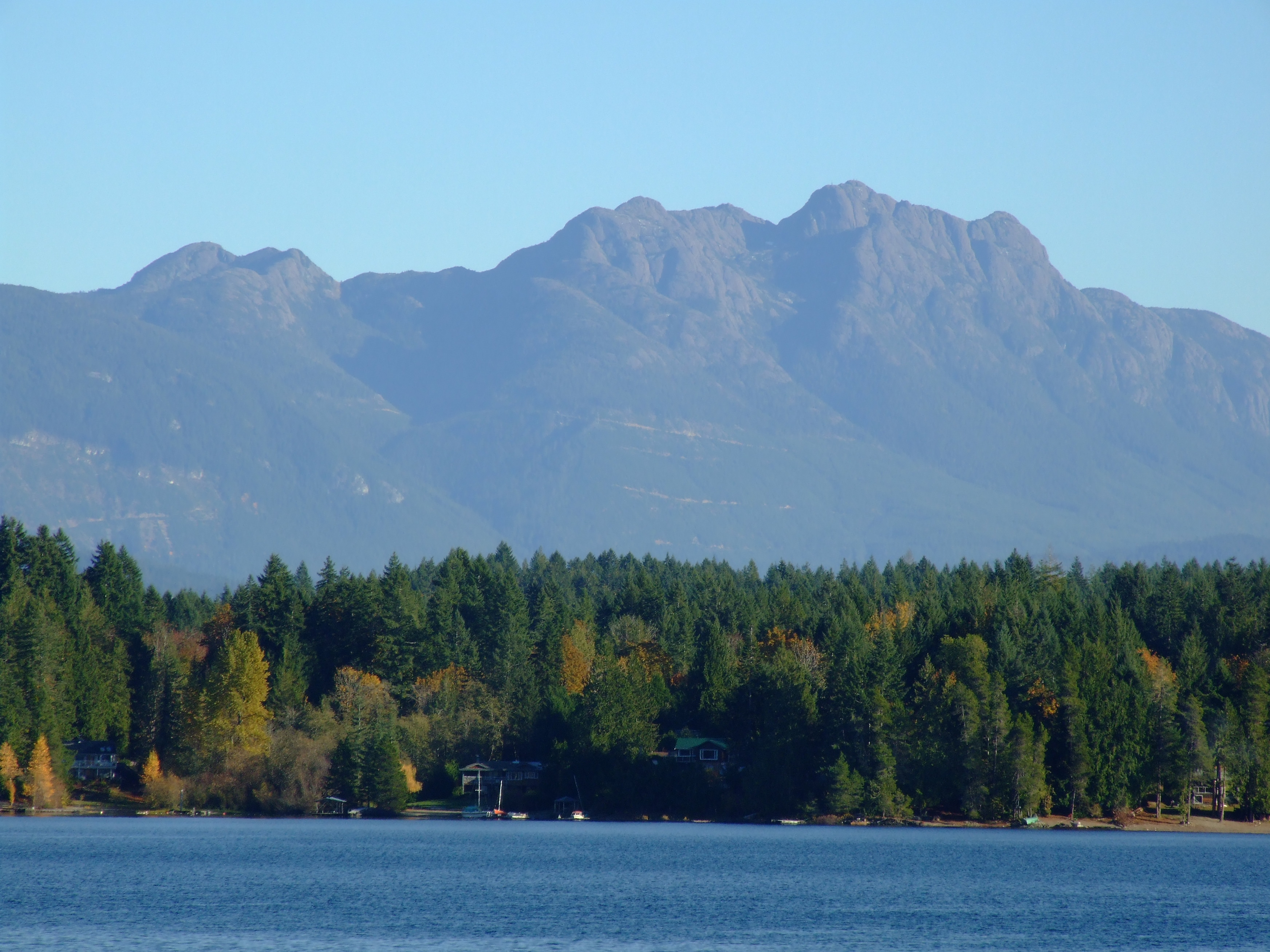
- Mount Arrowsmith from Sproat Lake

Highest point
- Elevation: 1,819 m (5,968 ft)
- Prominence: 1,429 m (4,688 ft)
- Listing: Mountains of British Columbia
- Coordinates: 49°13′25″N 124°35′40″W

Geography
- Location within British Columbia
- Location in Mount Arrowsmith Massif Regional Park
- Location: Vancouver Island, British Columbia, Canada
- District: Cameron Land District
- Parent range: Vancouver Island Ranges
- Topo map: NTS 92F2 Alberni Inlet

Climbing
- First ascent: John Macoun 1887
- Easiest route: scramble

Mount Arrowsmith is the highest mountain east of Port Alberni on Vancouver Island. Its dominant rock is basalt. The mountain is contained within the Mount Arrowsmith Biosphere Region and as of September 18, 2009 is designated part of 1,300 ha (3,200 acres) hectare Mt. Arrowsmith Massif Regional Park.

== History ==
The mountain is named kał-ka-č’ałḥ (Kulth-ka-choolth) meaning Jagged Points Facing Upward in the Tseshaht Nuu-chah-nulth languages.

The first recorded ascent by colonists was made by botanist John Macoun in 1887 led by local Indigenous guide Qualicum Tom and his son James Thomas. Macoun was a botanist to the Geological Survey of Canada. Mount Waddington was first seen from the peak of Mount Arrowsmith by Don and Phyllis Munday in 1925 (see also Mount Munday). The mountain was named about 1853 by Captain Richards for cartographers, Aaron Arrowsmith and his nephew John Arrowsmith.

== Biogeoclimatic zones ==
Mount Arrowsmith has three main biogeoclimatic zones. On the windward, wetter west-facing slopes the Coastal Western Hemlock zone occurs up to 1,050 m (3,440 ft), where it grades into the Mountain Hemlock zone. This forms a continuous forest up to 1,300 m (4,270 ft); above is a parkland phase which grades into the Alpine Tundra zone at 1,600 m (5,250 ft). The leeward, east-facing slopes are warmer thanks to more sunshine, and all zone boundaries are higher by 50 m (160 ft).

== See also ==
- List of mountains of British Columbia
