= Cassiar Mountains =

Mountain range in British Columbia and Yukon Territory, Canada

- French: Chaîne des Cassiars
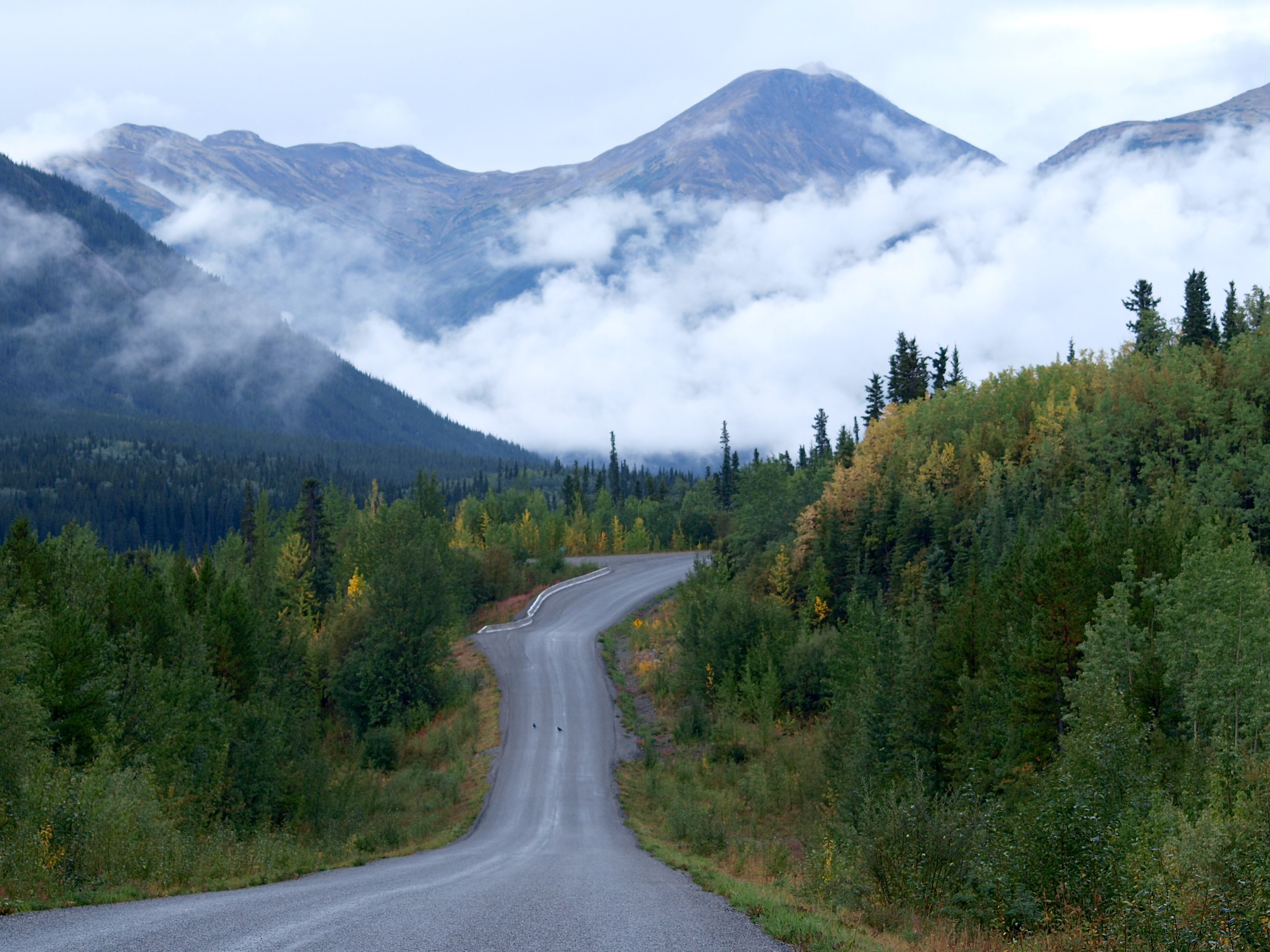
- Cassiar Mountains along Stewart-Cassiar Highway near Good Hope Lake

Highest point
- Peak: Thudaka Peak, British Columbia
- Elevation: 2,748 m (9,016 ft)
- Coordinates: 57°55′36.8″N 126°50′53.9″W

Geography
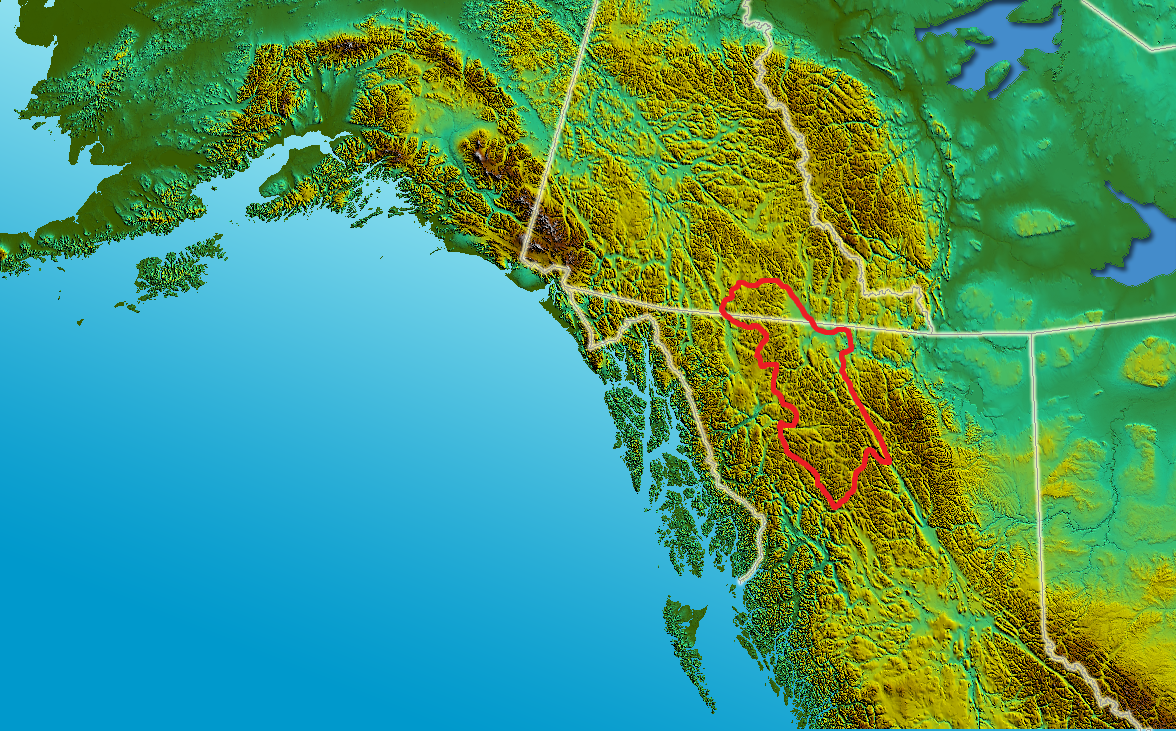
- Country: Canada
- Provinces: British Columbia and Yukon
- Range coordinates: 60°15′N 131°10′W
- Parent range: Interior Mountains

The Cassiar Mountains (French: Chaîne des Cassiars), also known as the Cassiars, are the most northerly group of the Northern Interior Mountains in the Canadian province of British Columbia and also extend slightly into the southernmost Yukon Territory. They lie north and west of the Omineca Mountains, west of the northernmost Rockies and the Rocky Mountain Trench, north of the Hazelton Mountains and east of the Boundary Ranges. They form a section of the Continental Divide, that, in this region, separates water drainage between the Arctic and Pacific Oceans. Physiographically, they are a section of the larger Yukon-Tanana Uplands province, which in turn are part of the larger Intermontane Plateaus physiographic division.

The highest mountain in the Cassiar Mountains is Thudaka Peak, at 2,748 m (9,016 ft).

== Sub-ranges and major summits ==
- Dease Plateau
  - Horseranch Range
- Kechika Ranges
  - Mount Skook Davidson
- Sifton Ranges
  - Cormier Range
  - Ruby Range
- Stikine Ranges
  - Beady Range
  - Nisutlin Plateau
  - Skree Range
  - Three Sisters Range
  - Thudaka Range
    - Thudaka Peak
  - Tuya Range
    - Ash Mountain
