= Stikine Ranges =

Group of mountain ranges and mountainous plateaus in British Columbia, Canada

The Stikine Ranges are a group of mountain ranges and mountainous plateaus in northwestern British Columbia, Canada. They are the northernmost subdivision of the Cassiar Mountains and among the least explored and most undeveloped parts of the province.

The Sifton Ranges, which are also part of the Cassiar Mountains, lie immediately east of the Stikine Ranges just north of the Finlay River; northwest of there the larger Kechika Ranges lie between the Stikine Ranges and the Rocky Mountain Trench. The Stikine Plateau lies to the west of the Stikine Ranges.

== Extent ==
The ranges run on a NW-SE axis from the Yukon boundary, adjacent to the Nisutlin Plateau at c. 60°00′00″N 131°45′00″W, to the Finlay River at c. 57°40′N 126°30′W.

== Sub-ranges ==
- Beady Range
- Nisutlin Plateau*
- Skree Range
- Three Sisters Range
- Thudaka Range
- Tuya Range
- Holland's map shows the Nisutlin Plateau as part of the Yukon Plateau, though in the text describes it as part of the Stikine Ranges.
