= Cracker Creek Cone =

Cinder cone in Canada

- Location within British Columbia
- Interactive map of Cracker Creek Cone

Highest point
- Elevation: 1,895 m (6,217 ft)
- Coordinates: 59.70°N 133.40°W

Geography
- Location: British Columbia, Canada
- Parent range: Teslin Plateau (southern Yukon Plateau)

Geology
- Rock age: Holocene
- Mountain type: Cinder cone
- Volcanic zone: Northern Cordilleran Volcanic Province
- Last eruption: Unknown

Cracker Creek Cone is a small cinder cone in northwestern British Columbia. A large lava flow that partly filled Ruby Creek may have originated from this cone. The lower west side of the cone appears to be partly covered by glacial till suggesting that the cone is older than the most recent glacial advances down Ruby Creek. Cracker Creek Cone is in the Northern Cordilleran Volcanic Province and is one of the three young volcanic cones in the Atlin Volcanic Field.

== See also ==
- List of Northern Cordilleran volcanoes
- List of volcanoes in Canada
- Volcanic history of the Northern Cordilleran Volcanic Province
- Volcanism of Canada
- Volcanism of Western Canada
