= Ruby Mountain =

Cinder cone in British Columbia, Canada

- Location within British Columbia
- Interactive map of Ruby Mountain

Highest point
- Elevation: 1,895 m (6,217 ft)
- Prominence: 265 m (869 ft)
- Coordinates: 59°41′59″N 133°22′07″W

Geography
- Location: British Columbia, Canada
- District: Cassiar Land District
- Parent range: Teslin Plateau (southern Yukon Plateau)
- Topo map: NTS 104N11 Surprise Lake

Geology
- Rock age: Holocene
- Mountain type: Cinder cone
- Volcanic zone: Northern Cordilleran Volcanic Province
- Last eruption: 1898?

Ruby Mountain, locally known as Old Volcano, is a cinder cone in Stikine Region, British Columbia, Canada, located 23 km (14 mi) northeast of Atlin and 6 km (4 mi) south of Mount Barham. A recent collapse on the volcano's eastern side created a large landslide which dissects this side of Ruby Mountain. The volcano is the largest feature within the Atlin Volcanic Field.

== November 8, 1898 eruption ==
Reports were received of eruptions in the Ruby Mountain area, about 80 km (50 mi) south of Gladys Lake, near the end of the 19th century. Miners working in the area were said to be able to work during the dark nights under the glow of the eruption. However, there has been no evidence found, such as lava flows young enough to have been the site of a historical eruption.

== See also ==
- Atlin Volcanic Field
- Volcanism of Canada
- Volcanism of Western Canada
- List of Northern Cordilleran volcanoes
- List of volcanoes in Canada
