= Atlin Volcanic Field =

Group of cinder cones in British Columbia, Canada

- Location within British Columbia

Highest point
- Elevation: 1,880 m (6,170 ft)
- Listing: Northern Cordilleran volcanoes
- Coordinates: 59°41′N 133°19′W

Geography
- Location: British Columbia, Canada
- Parent range: Teslin Plateau (southern Yukon Plateau)

Geology
- Rock age: Holocene
- Mountain type: Cinder cones
- Volcanic zone: Northern Cordilleran Volcanic Province
- Last eruption: Unknown; possible eruption in 1898.

The Atlin Volcanic Field, also called the Llangorse Volcanic Field and the Surprise Lake Volcanic Field, is a group of late-Pleistocene to Holocene cinder cones that lies on the Teslin Plateau east of Atlin Lake, Canada. The largest volcanic feature is the 1880-m-high Ruby Mountain, which has been partially dissected by Pleistocene and post-Wisconsin glaciation. Two basaltic cinder cones at the heads of Cracker Creek and Volcanic Creek lie within glacially dissected U-shaped valleys and may be of postglacial age.

== November 8, 1898 eruption ==
A Yukon newspaper reported in 1898 that an eruption was occurring near Atlin about 80 km (50 mi) south of Gladys Lake. Miners working in the area reportedly were able to work during the dark nights, due to the glow of the eruption. The article also reported that a group of people were going down from the Yukon to investigate the eruption, but no further reports were apparently made. Several recent studies, including a summary by Edwards et al. (2003) published by the Geological Survey of Canada, have determined that Ruby Mountain was definitely not the site of a historic eruption, nor were the Cracker Creek or Volcanic Creek cones.

One possible explanation for the story is that placer miners found gold-bearing gravels beneath an ancient lava flow at the base of Ruby Mountain, and were actively tunneling under the old lava flow to mine the gravels. As its name suggests, Ruby Mountain is ruby-colored, due to the scoriaceous tephra that covers much of its summit; and the summer sun shining off the ruby-red flanks of the volcano may have started the rumour. No field evidence of a sufficiently recent eruption has been found in the region, and the 19th-century report is considered uncertain.

== Volcanoes ==
Volcanoes within the field include:

- Volcanic Creek Cone
- Cracker Creek Cone
- Ruby Mountain
- Llangorse Mountain

== See also ==
- Northern Cordilleran Volcanic Province
- List of volcanoes in Canada
- List of volcanic fields
- Volcanism of Canada
- Volcanism of Western Canada
- Volcanic history of the Northern Cordilleran Volcanic Province
