= Asperity =

Asperity may refer to:

- Asperity (faults), a "stuck" part of a geologic fault
- Asperity Mountain, a mountain in British Columbia, Canada
- MV Asperity, a British coaster in service 1945–1967
- Asperity (materials science), the unevenness of a surface, in physics and in seismology
- Asperity (geotechnical engineering)
