= Ruby Range =

Ruby Range may refer to the following mountain ranges:

- Ruby Range (Valhalla Ranges), British Columbia, Canada
- Ruby Range (Sifton Ranges), British Columbia, Canada
- Ruby Range (Yukon), Canada
- Ruby Range (Colorado), United States
- Ruby Range (Montana), United States

== See also ==
- Ruby Mountains
