= Thudaka Peak =

Mountain in British Columbia, Canada

- Location within British Columbia

Highest point
- Elevation: 2,748 m (9,016 ft)
- Prominence: 1,736 m (5,696 ft)
- Listing: Canada highest major peaks 93rd; Canada prominent peaks 71st; Canada most isolated peaks 52nd
- Coordinates: 57°55′36.8″N 126°50′53.9″W

Geography
- Location: British Columbia, Canada
- District: Cassiar Land District
- Parent range: Thudaka Range, Cassiar Mountains
- Topo map: NTS 94E15 Thudaka Peak

Thudaka Peak is the highest mountain of the Thudaka Range of the Cassiar Mountains in the Northern Interior of British Columbia, Canada, located between the heads of the Obo River and the Frog River. Glaciers exist on Thudaka's northern flanks, but the zone is usually quite dry.

== See also ==
- List of Ultras of North America

== Sources ==
- "Thudaka Peak". BC Geographical Names. Government of British Columbia – B.C. Geographical Names Office (BCGNO).
- Thudaka Peak in the Canadian Mountain Encyclopedia
- "Thudaka Mountain, British Columbia" on Peakbagger
