= Asperity Mountain =

Mountain in British Columbia, Canada

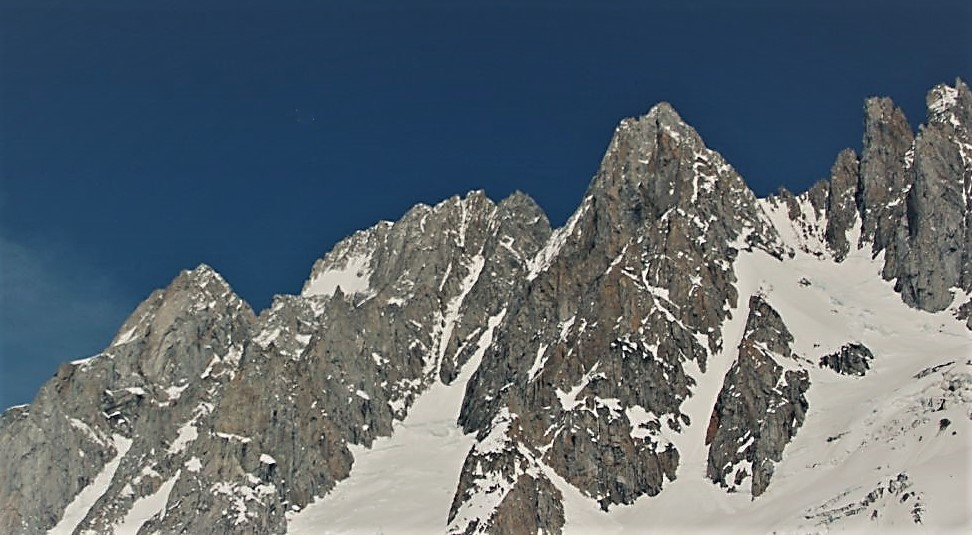
- L→Rː Combatant Mountain, Mount Tiedemann, Asperity Mountain, Serra Peaks

Highest point
- Elevation: 3,723 m (12,215 ft)
- Prominence: 1,516 m (4,974 ft)(from Tiedemann Glacier)
- Listing: Mountains of British Columbia
- Coordinates: 51°23′26″N 125°13′19″W

Geography
- Location within British Columbia
- Location: Cariboo Junction, British Columbia, Canada
- District: Range 2 Coast Land District
- Parent range: Waddington Range; Pacific Ranges
- Topo map: NTS 92N6 Mount Waddington

Climbing
- First ascent: 1947

Asperity Mountain is a mountain located in British Columbia, Canada, rising to 3,723 metres (12,215 ft). (Note: Another source claims 3716 m.) It is located between Tellot and Tiedemann Glaciers on the north and south respectively, in the Waddington Range, a subrange of the Pacific Ranges. The gorge of the Homathko River runs north to south on the east side of the mountain, carrying runoff from the mountain and glaciers to the Pacific Ocean.

The term "Asperity", which the mountain takes its name from, refers to "unevenness of surface, roughness, ruggedness". The name was made official on February 23, 1978, although it was labeled as early as 1929 by Don Munday.

Asperity Mountain is described as being a "fine, high, sharp summit", with Mount Tiedemann to the west and the Serra Peaks bordering it on the east. Its south side is described as being rocky. There is an icefall to its north from the Radiant Glacier, a branch of the Tellot Glacier.
