= Cormier Range =

Mountain range in British Columbia, Canada

- Location within British Columbia

Geography
- Country: Canada
- Province: British Columbia
- Range coordinates: 57°30′0″N 125°55′0″W
- Parent range: Sifton Ranges

The Cormier Range is a subrange of the Sifton Ranges, located between the Finlay River and Fox River in northern British Columbia, Canada. This northwest trending mountain range extends from Ware to Fox Pass.
