= Mount Tiedemann =

Mountain in British Columbia, Canada

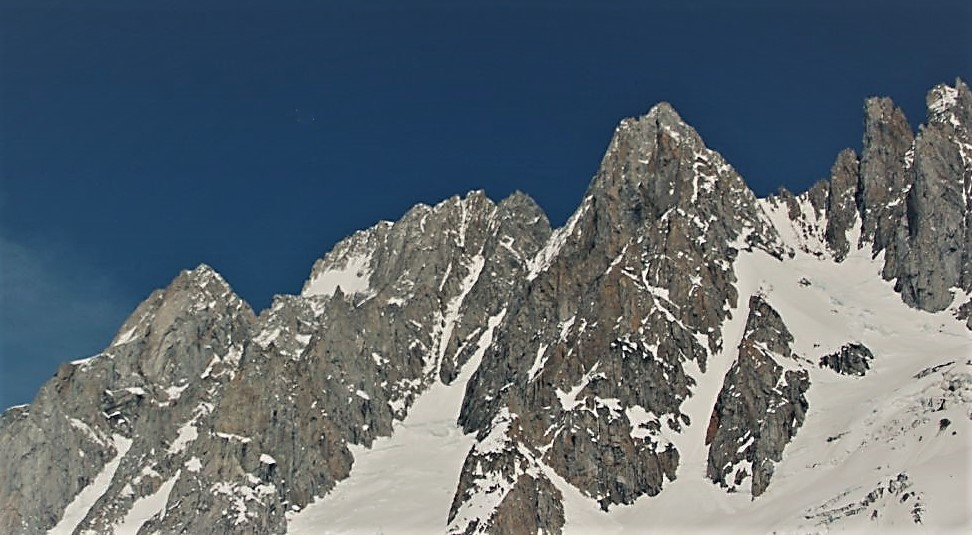
- L→Rː Combatant Mountain, Mount Tiedemann, Asperity Mountain, Serra Peaks

Highest point
- Elevation: 3,838 m (12,592 ft)
- Prominence: 848 m (2,782 ft)
- Parent peak: Mount Waddington (4019 m)
- Listing: Mountains of British Columbia; Canada highest major peaks 25th
- Coordinates: 51°23′37″N 125°14′10″W

Geography
- Location within British Columbia
- Interactive map of Mount Tiedemann
- Location: British Columbia, Canada
- District: Range 2 Coast Land District
- Parent range: Waddington Range, Pacific Ranges, Coast Mountains
- Topo map: NTS 92N6 Mount Waddington

Climbing
- First ascent: 9 July 1939 by S. Hendricks, H. Fuhrer, R. Gibson, H. Hall
- Easiest route: rock/ice climb

Mount Tiedemann 3,838 m (12,592 ft), prominence 848 m (2,782 ft), is one of the principal summits of the Pacific Ranges subdivision of the Coast Mountains of British Columbia. It is located 3 km (1.9 mi) northeast of Mount Waddington in the Waddington Range massif between the Homathko and Klinaklini Rivers.

== Name origin ==
Mount Tiedemann is named for Herman Otto Tiedemann, who worked for the colonial government under Surveyor-General Joseph Pemberton, designing and supervising construction of Victoria, British Columbia's "Birdcages", the original legislature buildings there, the former courthouse (now the Maritime Museum), the Fisgard Lighthouse and other buildings and churches, all while conducting surveys of the British Columbia and Alaska coast. He was responsible for first bringing water from Elk Lake to the city as a water supply.

In 1862, he had accompanied Alfred Waddington on preliminary surveys for the proposed wagon road to the Cariboo goldfields via Bute Inlet and the Homathko River, the demise of which project came with the opening events of the Chilcotin War of 1864. Tiedmann Creek, which flows from the Tiedemann Glacier eastwards to the Homathko, was so-named by himself because he had fallen into it and nearly died.

== Climbing history ==
The first ascent was in 1939 by Sterling Hendricks, Hans Fuhrer, E.R. Gibson, Henry S. Hall via the Chaos Glacier to the North Aréte.

== Climate ==
Based on the Köppen climate classification, Mount Tiedemann has an ice cap climate. Most weather fronts originate in the Pacific Ocean, and travel east toward the Coast Mountains where they are forced upward by the range (Orographic lift), causing them to drop their moisture in the form of rain or snowfall. As a result, the Coast Mountains experience high precipitation, especially during the winter months in the form of snowfall. Temperatures can drop below −20 °C with wind chill factors below −30 °C. This climate supports the Chaos, Radiant and Tiedemann glaciers which surround the slopes of Mount Tiedemann.

== Gallery ==
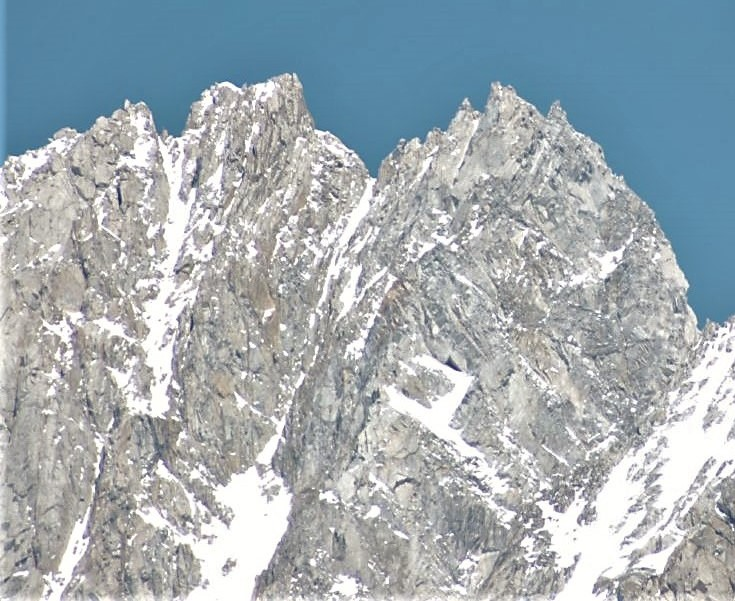
Mount Tiedemann
