= Combatant Mountain =

Mountain in British Columbia, Canada

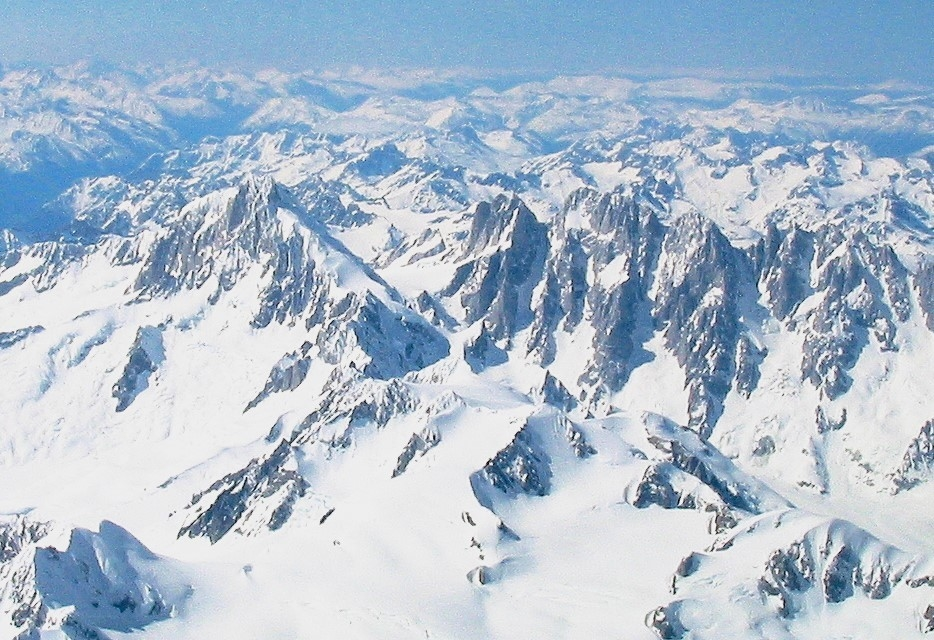
- Combatant centered, from southeast. (Tiedemann to right, Waddington to left)

Highest point
- Elevation: 3,762 m (12,343 ft)
- Prominence: 242 m (794 ft)
- Parent peak: Mount Tiedemann (3,838 m)
- Isolation: 0.51 km (0.32 mi)
- Listing: Mountains of British Columbia
- Coordinates: 51°23′30″N 125°14′42″W

Geography
- Location within British Columbia Location within Canada
- Interactive map of Combatant Mountain
- Country: Canada
- Province: British Columbia
- District: Range 2 Coast Land District
- Parent range: Coast Mountains; Waddington Range
- Topo map: NTS 92N6 Mount Waddington

Geology
- Rock type: Granite

Climbing
- First ascent: 14 July 1933
- Easiest route: Northwest Ridge mid-class 5

Combatant Mountain, also called Mount Combatant, is a 3,762-metre (12,343-foot) summit in British Columbia, Canada.

== Description ==
Combatant Mountain is located in the Waddington Range of the Coast Mountains, in a remote wilderness area that few visit. Combatant Mountain is set 152 km (94 mi) north of the community of Campbell River and 2.38 kilometres (1.48 mi) northeast of Mount Waddington, the highest peak of the entire Coast Mountains range. Combatant ranks as the third-highest peak in the Coast Mountains, seventh-highest in British Columbia, and 33rd-highest in Canada. Precipitation runoff and glacier meltwater from the mountain drains to Bute Inlet via the Homathko River. Topographic relief is significant as the summit rises 1,360 meters (4,462 feet) above the Tiedemann Glacier in 1.5 kilometer (0.9 mile). Combatant Mountain has some of the more challenging and famous rock-climbing routes of the Waddington Range.

== History ==
A photo identifying the peak as "Mt. Combatant" was published in 1929 in the Canadian Alpine Journal.

The first ascent of the summit was made on 14 July 1933 by Don Munday, Phyllis Munday, Hans Fuhrer, Henry S. Hall Jr. and Alfred E. Roovers.

The name "Combatant Mountain" was identified in 1948 by mountaineer Don Munday and the toponym was officially adopted October 5, 1950, by the Geographical Names Board of Canada. Munday wrote that the peak "presents a slender, fairly symmetrical form, ...a pair of pale reddish buttresses support the twin peaks and a slanting shelf of some breadth breaks the continuity of the eastern buttress in its otherwise clean upthrust out of Tiedemann Glacier. Combatant claims rank as a classic of mountain architecture because of its simplicity and unity in expressing aspiration."

Skywalk is a classic climbing route on the Southwest Buttress that was first climbed in 1982 by Scott Flavelle and Dave Lane.

The South Buttress was first climbed in August 1994 by Greg Child, Greg Collum and Steve Mascioli via a route they named Belligerence.

== Climate ==
Based on the Köppen climate classification, Combatant Mountain has an ice cap climate. Most weather fronts originate in the Pacific Ocean and travel east toward the Coast Mountains where they are forced upward by the range (orographic lift), causing them to drop their moisture in the form of rain or snowfall. As a result, the Coast Mountains experience high precipitation, especially during the winter months in the form of snowfall. Winter temperatures can drop below −20 °C with wind chill factors below −30 °C. This climate supports the Chaos, Scimitar, and Tiedemann glaciers surrounding Combatant Mountain.

== Gallery ==
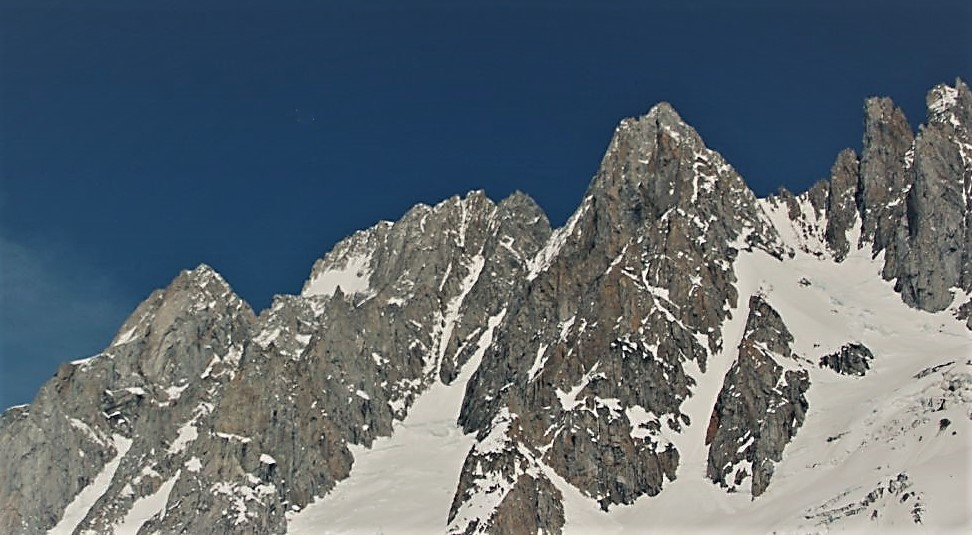
Left to rightː Combatant Mountain, Mount Tiedemann, Asperity Mountain, Serra Peaks

== See also ==
- Geography of British Columbia
