= Thudaka Range =

Mountain range in British Columbia, Canada

- Location within British Columbia

Highest point
- Peak: Thudaka Peak
- Elevation: 2,748 m (9,016 ft)
- Coordinates: 57°55′36.8″N 126°50′53.9″W

Geography
- Country: Canada
- Region: British Columbia
- Parent range: Stikine Ranges

The Thudaka Range is a mountain range located east of the Rocky Mountain Trench in British Columbia, Canada bounded by the Obo River on the east, the Frog River on the west, and on the south by the pass between Geese and Thudaka Creeks. The highest peak in the range is Thudaka Peak at 2,748 m (9,016 ft). The range is part of the Stikine Ranges.

== See also ==
- List of mountain ranges
