= Volcanic Creek Cone =

Cinder cone in Canada

- Location within British Columbia
- Interactive map of Volcanic Creek Cone

Highest point
- Elevation: 1,520 m (4,990 ft)
- Coordinates: 59.76°N 133.38°W

Geography
- Location: British Columbia, Canada
- District: Cassiar Land District
- Parent range: Tagish Highland

Geology
- Rock age: Pleistocene
- Mountain type: Cinder cone
- Last eruption: Holocene

Volcanic Creek Cone is a small cinder cone 20 kilometres (12 miles) northeast of Atlin in northwestern British Columbia. There are two cinder cones and a lava flow at least 3 kilometres (2 miles) long which is present below parts of the tree covered area. The subdued form of Volcanic Creek cone is visible directly below the largest snow patch. The cone has probably suffered through at least one glacial episode. Volcanic Creek cone is part of the Northern Cordilleran Volcanic Province.

== See also ==
- List of Northern Cordilleran volcanoes
- List of volcanoes in Canada
- Volcanism of Western Canada
