= Skree Range =

Mountain range in British Columbia, Canada

- Location within British Columbia

Geography
- Country: Canada
- Province: British Columbia
- Range coordinates: 58°58′N 129°45′W
- Parent range: Stikine Ranges

The Skree Range is a subrange of the Stikine Ranges, located between the Dease River and Eagle River in northern British Columbia, Canada.
