= Beady Range =

Mountain range in British Columbia, Canada

- Location within British Columbia

Highest point
- Elevation: 1,380 m (4,530 ft)

Geography
- Country: Canada
- Province: British Columbia
- Range coordinates: 58°50′N 129°54′W
- Parent range: Stikine Ranges
- Topo map: NTS 104I13 Joe Irwin Lake

The Beady Range is a subrange of the Stikine Ranges, located northeast of northern Dease Lake in northern British Columbia, Canada.
