= Sifton Ranges =

Mountain range in British Columbia, Canada

- Location within British Columbia

Highest point
- Elevation: 1,945 m (6,381 ft)

Geography
- Country: Canada
- Province: British Columbia
- Range coordinates: 57°47′N 126°14′W
- Parent range: Cassiar Mountains

The Sifton Ranges are a mountain range along the west side of the Rocky Mountain Trench in northern British Columbia, Canada. It has an area of 1823 km^{2} and is a subrange of the Cassiar Mountains which in turn form part of the Interior Mountains.

== Sub-ranges ==
- Cormier Range
- Ruby Range
