= Nisutlin Plateau =

Sub-plateau of the Yukon Plateau in Canada

- Plateau
- Location within British Columbia
- Coordinates: 59°50′N 132°00′W
- Location: British Columbia and Yukon
- Part of: Yukon Plateau

The Nisutlin Plateau is a sub-plateau, of the Yukon Plateau physiographic section, in northern British Columbia, Canada, extending east from Teslin Lake to the Cassiar Mountains.

== See also ==
- Teslin Plateau
