= Ruby Range (Sifton Ranges) =

Subrange of the Sifton Ranges in northern British Columbia, Canada

Coordinates: 57°45′N 126°25′W

- Location within British Columbia

Highest point
- Elevation: 1,945 m (6,381 ft)

Geography
- Country: Canada
- Province: British Columbia
- Parent range: Sifton Ranges

The Ruby Range is a subrange of the Sifton Ranges, located west of Spinnel Creek and east of Obo River in northern British Columbia, Canada.
