= Teslin Plateau =

Sub-plateau of the Yukon Plateau in Canada

- Plateau
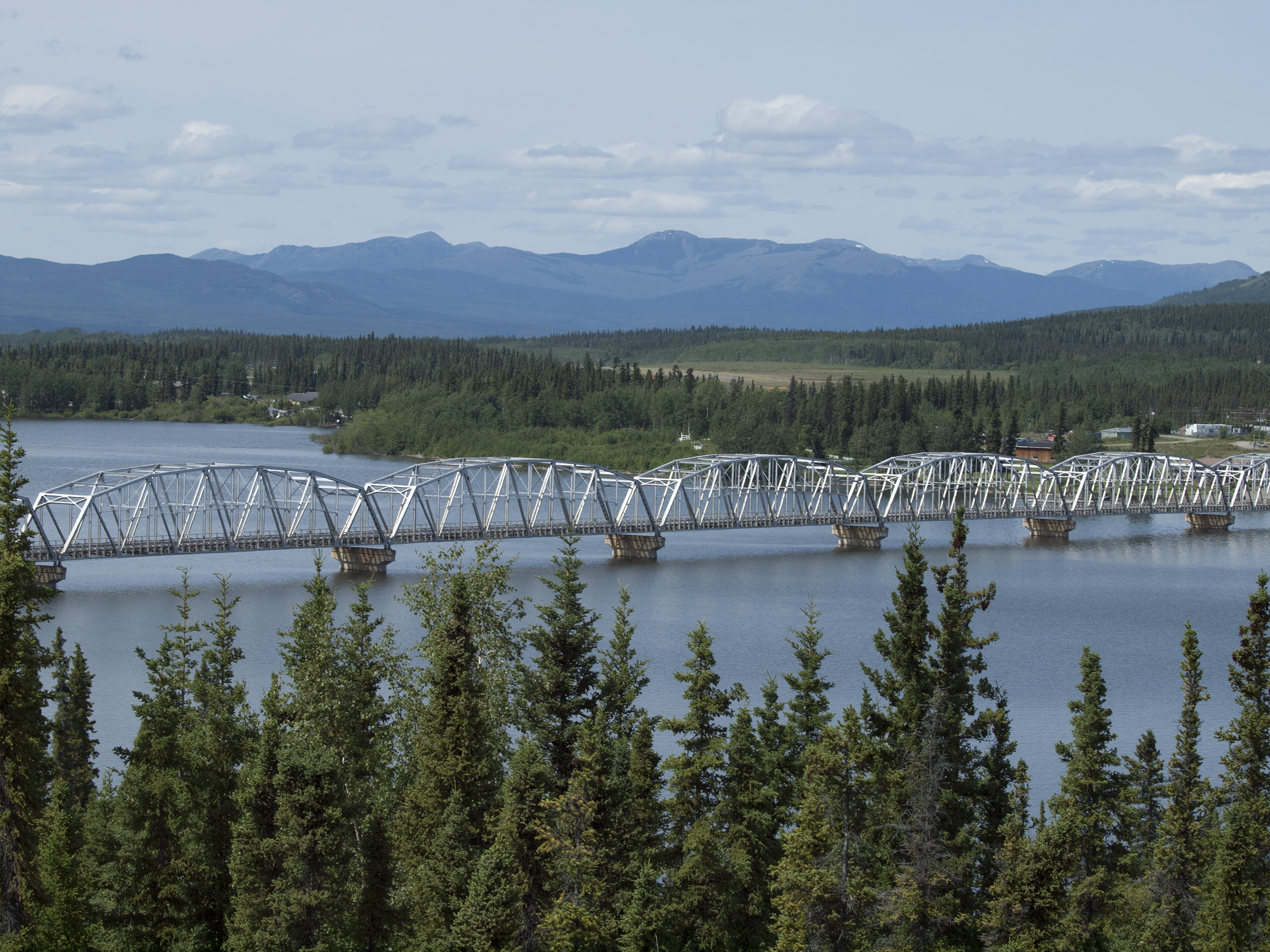
- Teslin Plateau from Teslin Lake

- Location within British Columbia
- Coordinates: 59°40′00″N 132°55′00″W
- Location: British Columbia and Yukon
- Part of: Yukon Plateau

The Teslin Plateau is a sub-plateau, of the Yukon Plateau physiographic section, in northern British Columbia, Canada, located north of the Nakina River between Atlin Lake and Teslin Lake.

== See also ==
- Atlin Volcanic Field
- Nisutlin Plateau
