= Yukon Plateau =

Plateau located in the Yukon Territory, Canada

- Plateau
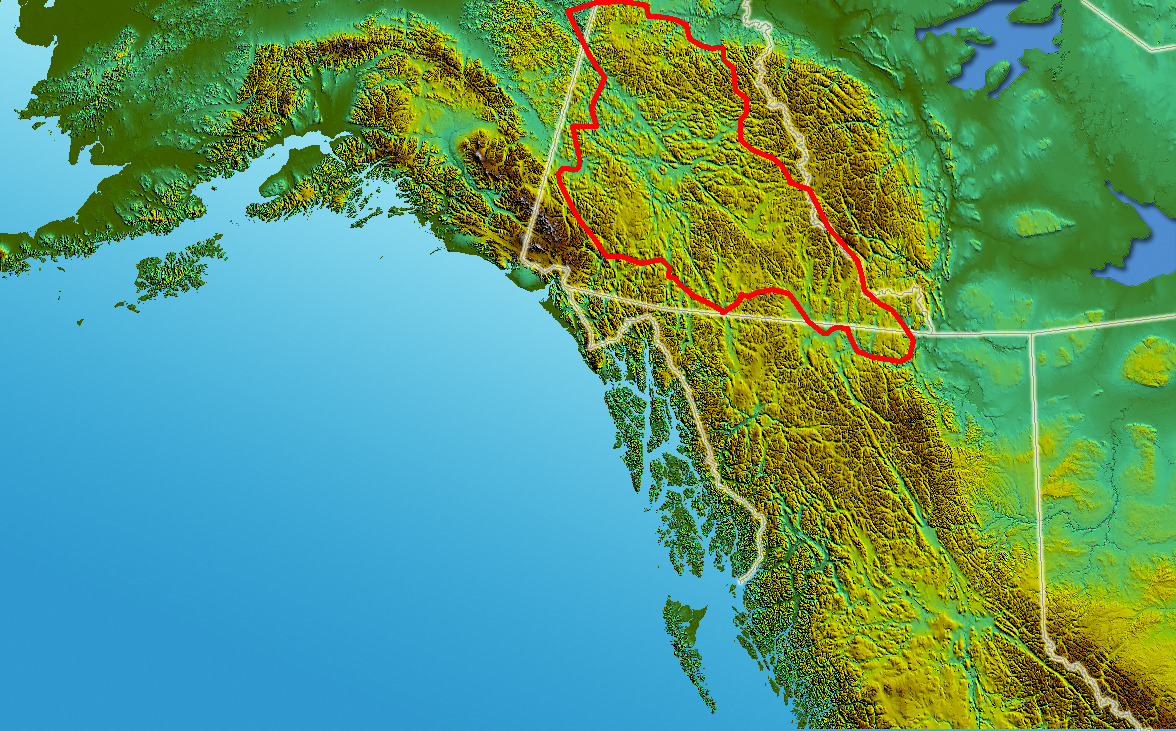
- Map of Yukon Plateau

- Location within Yukon
- Coordinates: 62°15′00″N 137°15′00″W
- Location: British Columbia and Yukon
- Part of: Intermontane Plateaus

The Yukon Plateau is a plateau (also defined as a plain) located in the Yukon Territory, comprising much of the central and southern Yukon Territory and the far northern part of British Columbia, Canada between Tagish Lake (W) and the Cassiar Mountains (E) and north of the Nakina River.

Sub-plateaus include the Teslin Plateau and the Nisutlin Plateau, west and east of Teslin Lake, respectively.

== See also ==
- Yukon Interior dry forests
- Yukon Ranges
