= Mount Bell =

Mount Bell may refer to:

- Mount Bell (Antarctica)
- Mount Bell (Alberta) in Alberta, Canada
- Mount Bell (British Columbia) in the Coast Mountains of Canada
- Mount Bell (California) in the Santa Monica Mountains of California, USA
- Mount Bell (New South Wales) in the Blue Mountains, Australia
- Mount Bell (Yukon) in the Yukon Territory of Canada
