= Chimney Peak (Canada) =

Mountain in Alberta and British Columbia, Canada

- Location within Alberta Location within British Columbia Location within Canada

Highest point
- Elevation: 3,001 m (9,846 ft)
- Prominence: 131 m (430 ft)
- Parent peak: Mount Fay (3235 m)
- Listing: Mountains of Alberta; Mountains of British Columbia
- Coordinates: 51°15′52″N 116°09′19″W

Geography
- Country: Canada
- Provinces: Alberta and British Columbia
- Protected areas: Banff National Park; Kootenay National Park
- Parent range: Bow Range
- Topo map: NTS 82N8 Lake Louise

Climbing
- First ascent: 1910 by E.O. Wheeler and T.G. Longstaff

Chimney Peak is located at the northeastern end of Kootenay National Park just south of Quadra Mountain and straddles the Continental Divide marking the Alberta-British Columbia border. It was named in 1910 by T.G. Longstaff and Captain E.O. Wheeler who made its first ascent through a chimney.

== See also ==
- List of peaks on the Alberta–British Columbia border
- List of mountains in the Canadian Rockies
