= Consolation Valley =

Valley in Alberta, Canada

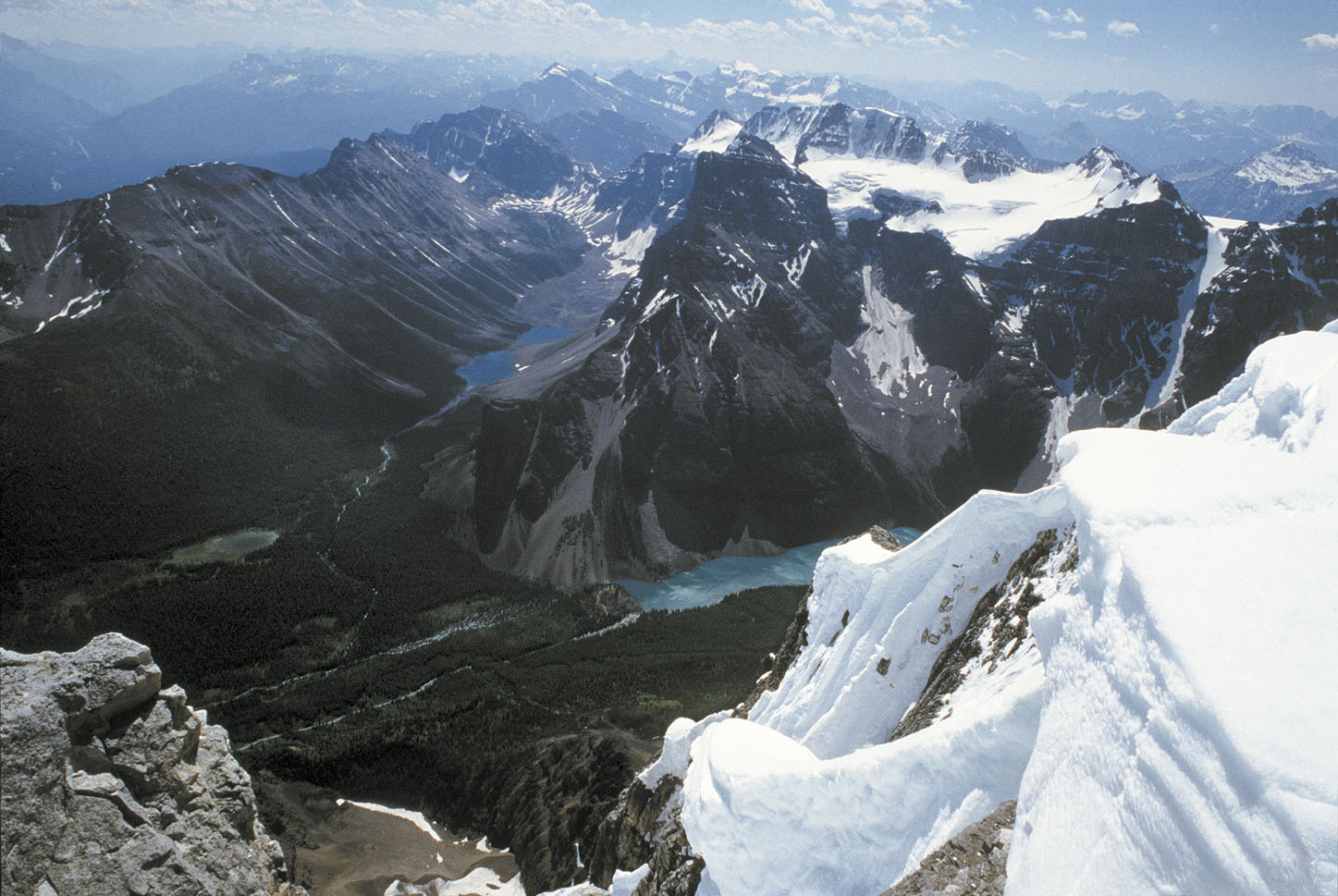
- Consolation Valley to left of center

- Location within Alberta Location within Canada

Geography
- Country: Canada
- Province: Alberta
- Coordinates: 51°19′18″N 116°09′10″W
- Topo map: NTS 82N8 Lake Louise
- River: Babel Creek
- Interactive map of Consolation Valley

Consolation Valley is a valley in Alberta, Canada. It is situated within Banff National Park, and adjacent to Valley of the Ten Peaks.

Consolation Valley was so named on account of its fine appearance. The landform's toponym was officially adopted on July 2, 1959, by the Geographical Names Board of Canada. The valley is bound by Mount Babel, Mount Fay, Quadra Mountain, Bident Mountain, Mount Bell, and Panorama Ridge. Two lakes officially named Consolation Lakes occupy the valley and are drained by Babel Creek. The head of the valley (south end) opens at Consolation Pass.

== Climate ==
Based on the Köppen climate classification, the valley is located in a subarctic climate zone with cold, snowy winters, and mild summers. Winter temperatures can drop below -20 °C with wind chill factors below -30 °C.

== Gallery ==
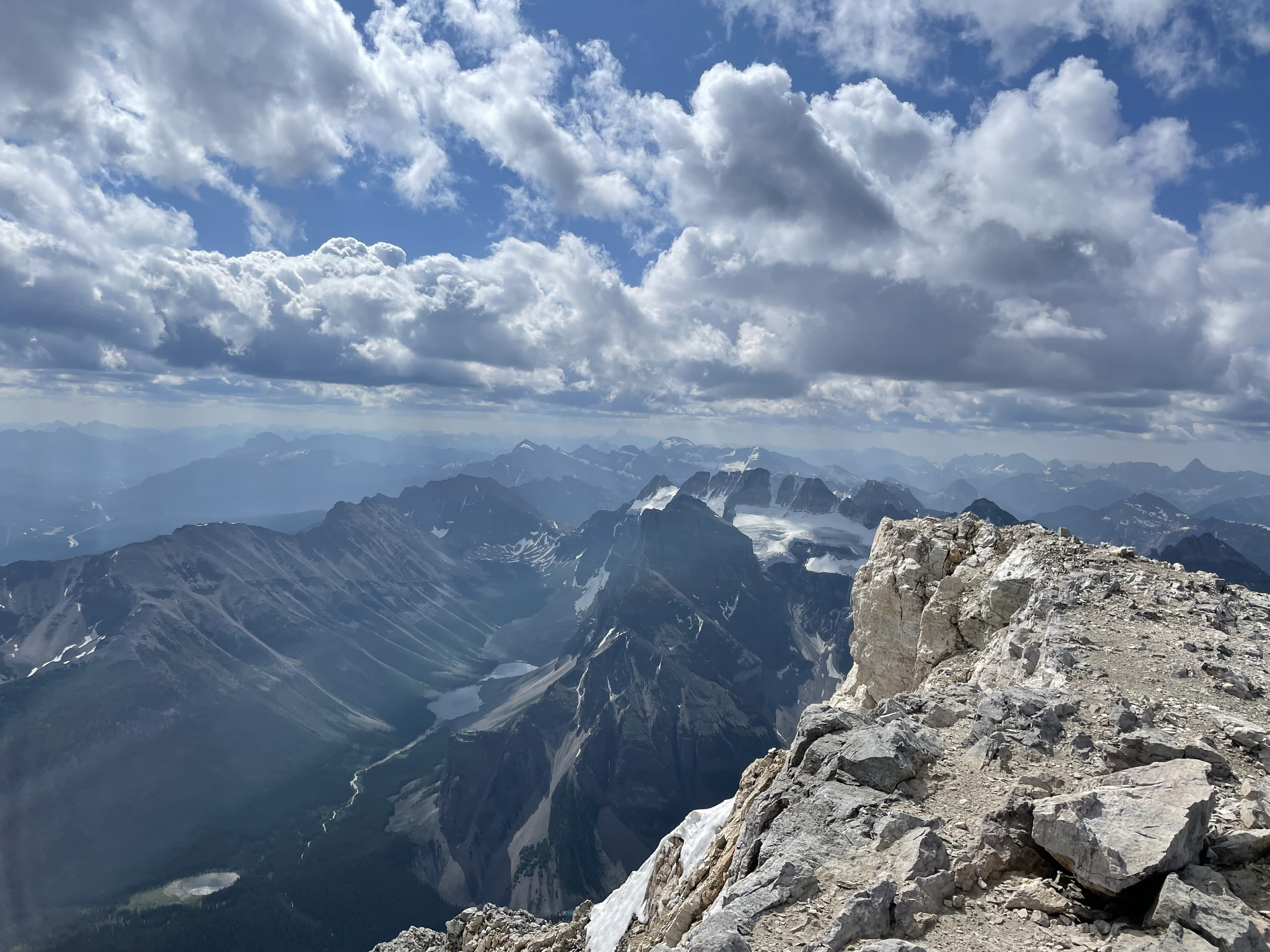
Consolation Valley and Consolation Lakes left of center, seen from Mt. Temple

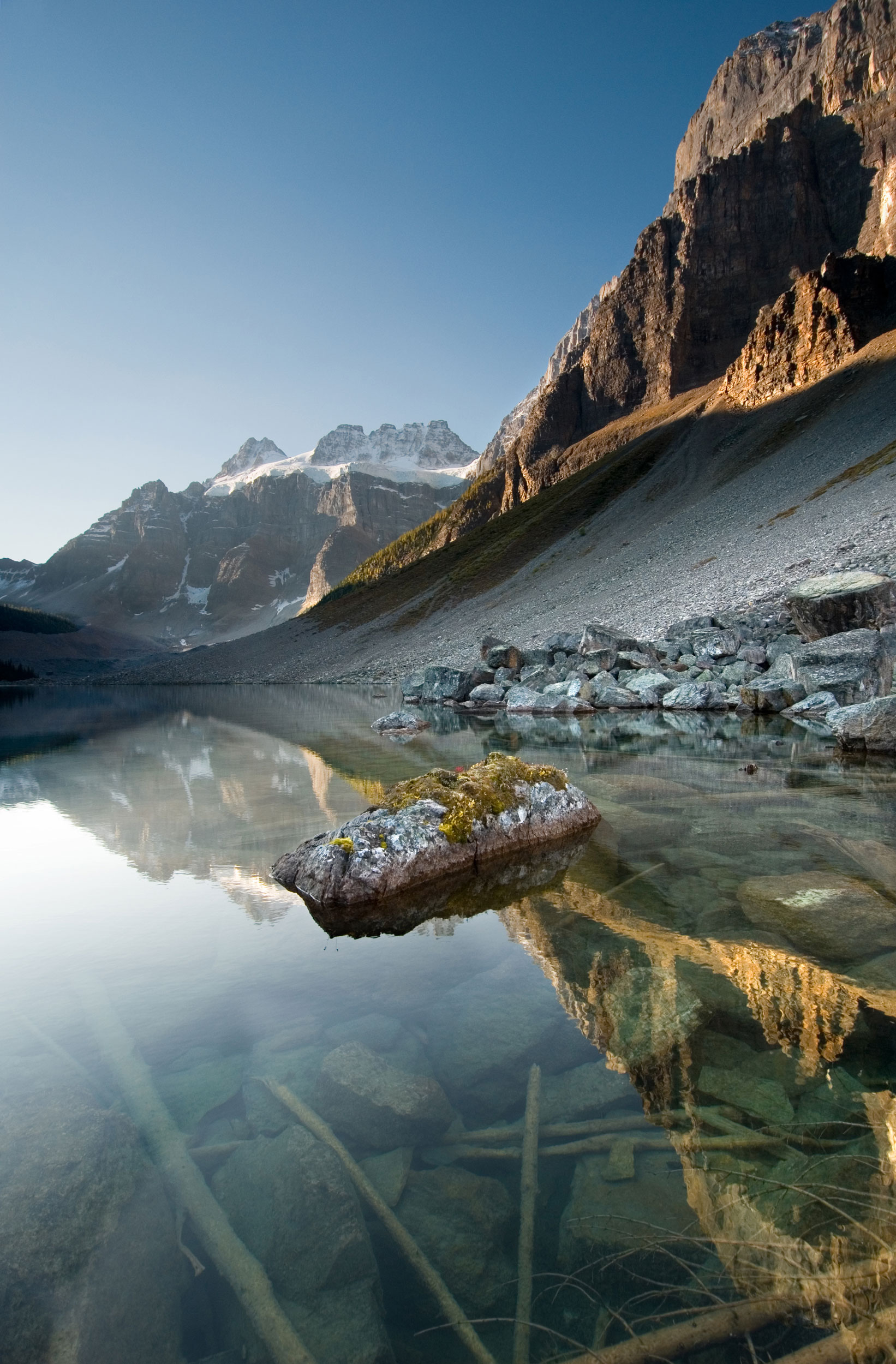
Quadra Mountain seen from Consolation Valley

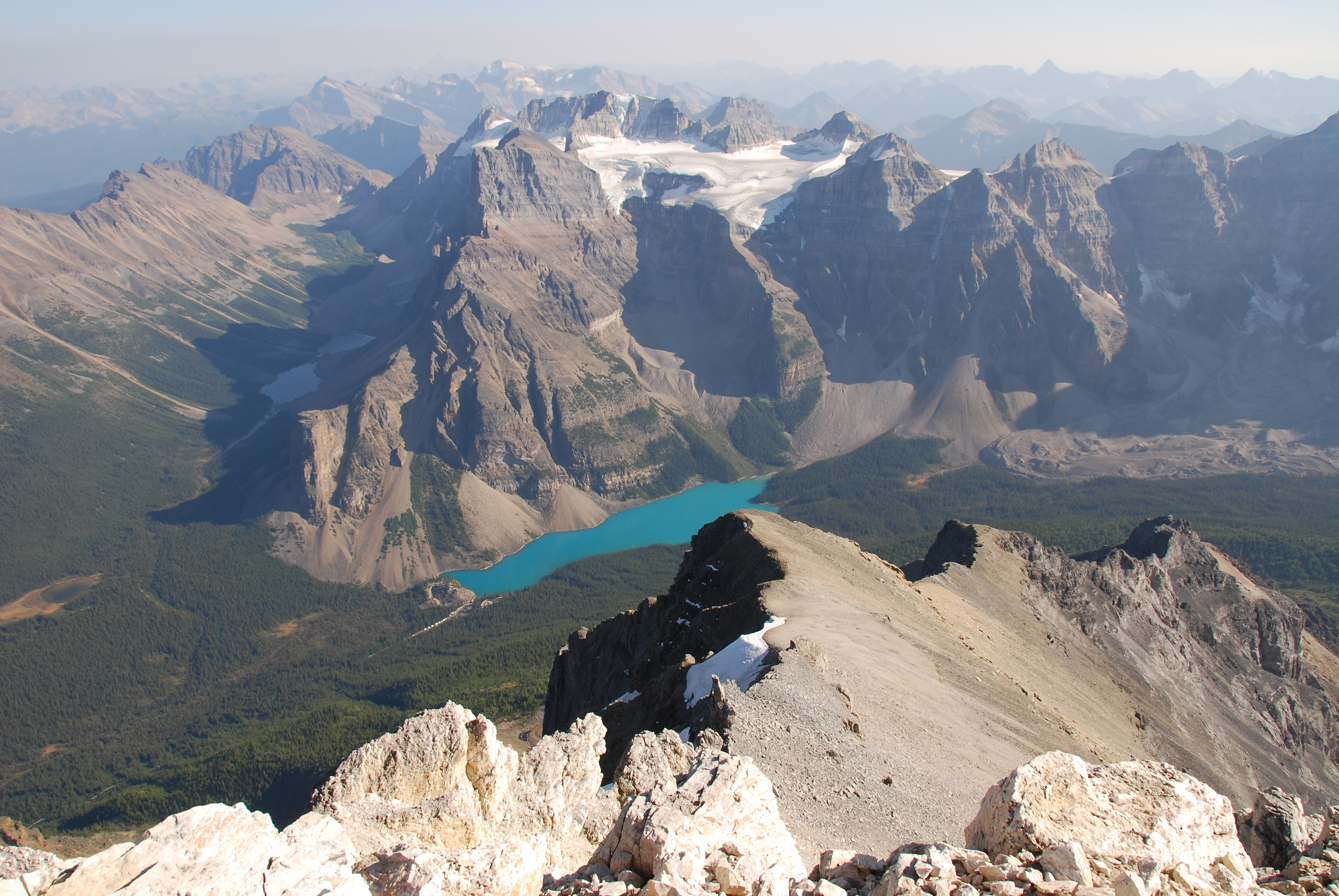
Consolation Valley to left, seen from Mt. Temple

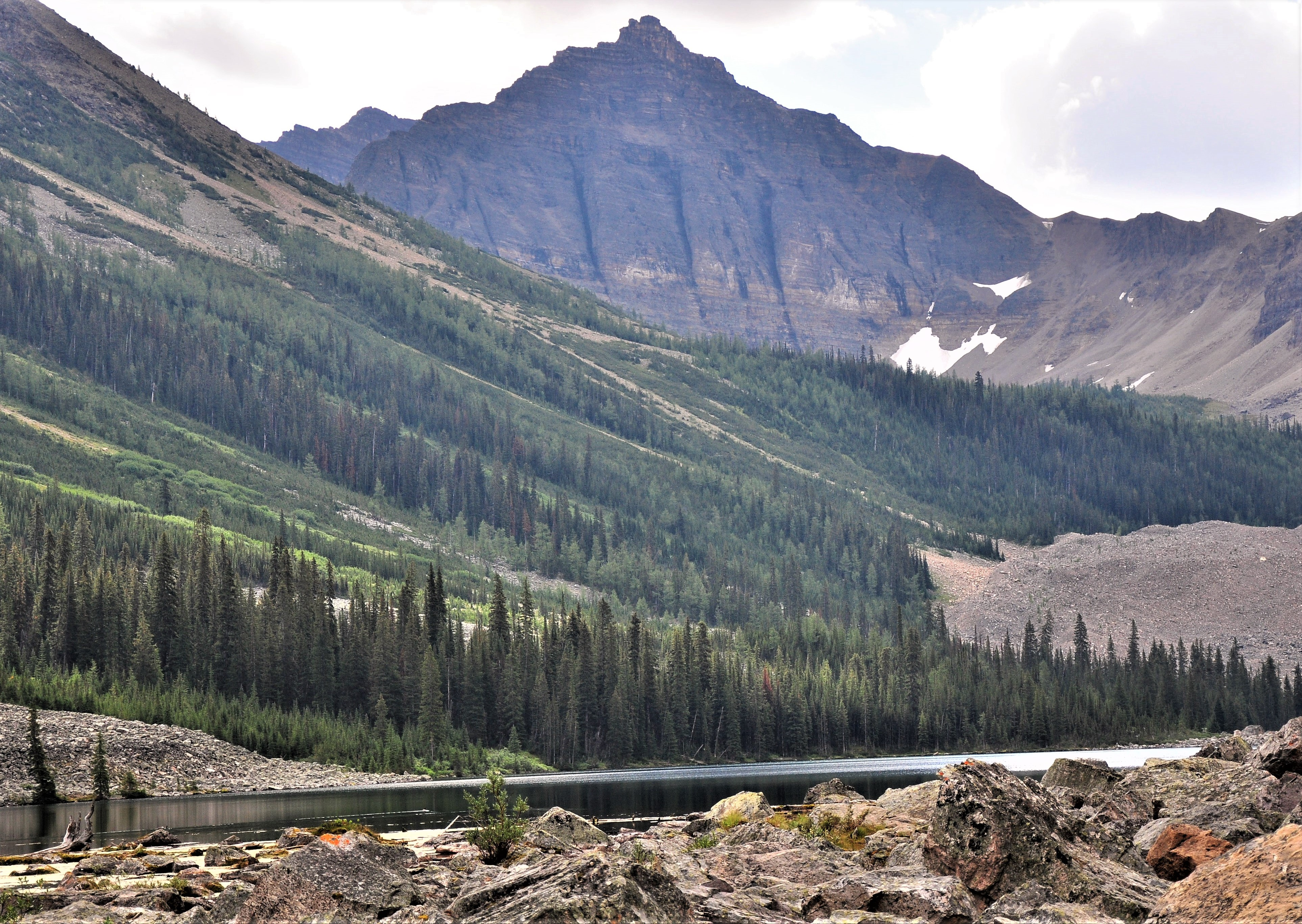
Northwest aspect of Mt. Bell from Consolation Valley
