= Bident Mountain =

Mountain in Banff NP, Alberta, Canada

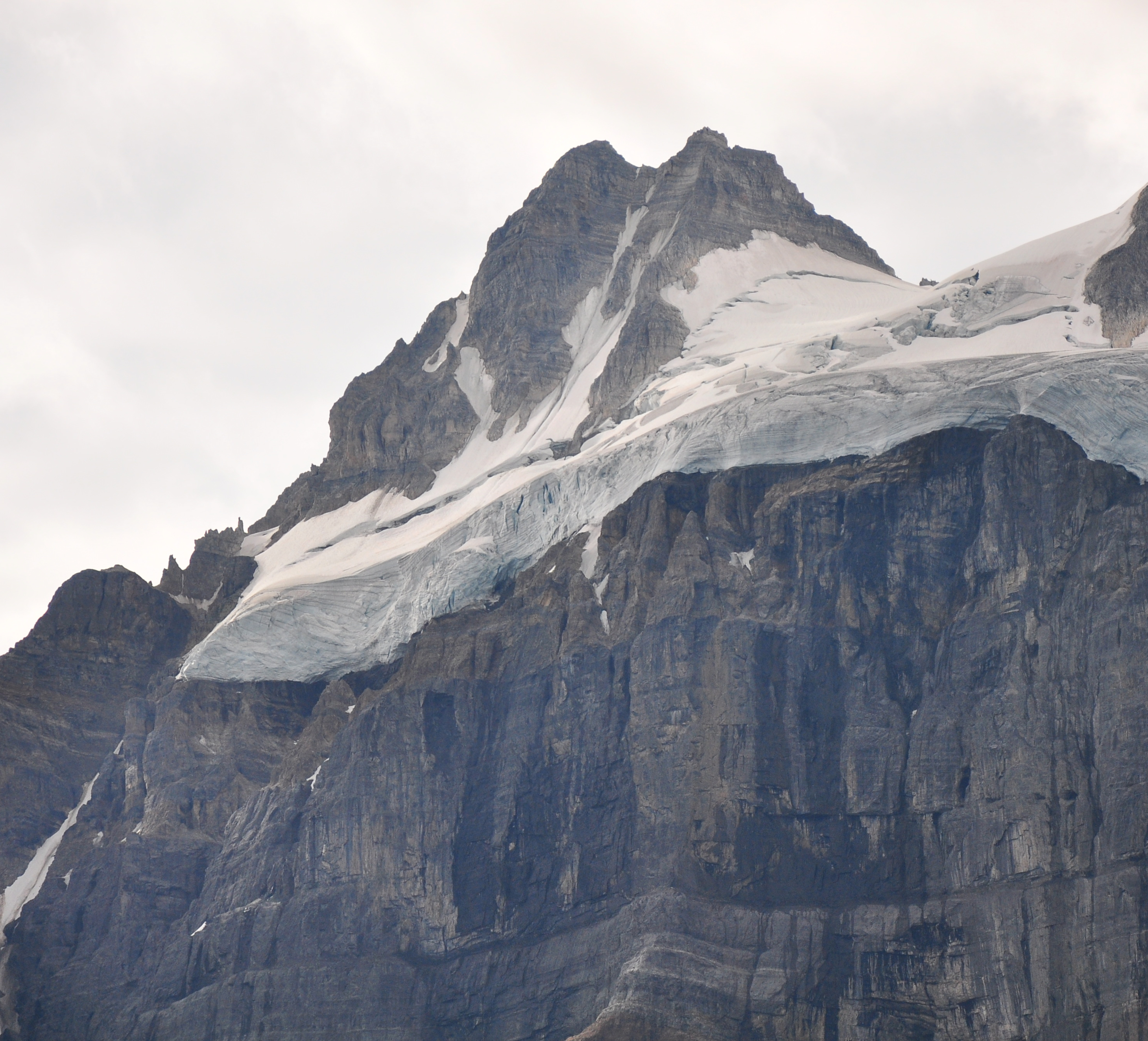
- Bident Mountain from Consolation Lakes Trail

Highest point
- Elevation: 3,088 m (10,131 ft) (Note: Other sources state 3084 m.)
- Prominence: 103 m (338 ft)
- Parent peak: Quadra Mountain (3173 m)
- Listing: Mountains of Alberta
- Coordinates: 51°17′15″N 116°08′28″W

Geography
- Location within Alberta Location within Canada
- Country: Canada
- Province: Alberta
- Protected area: Banff National Park
- Parent range: Bow Range
- Topo map: NTS 82N8 Lake Louise

Climbing
- First ascent: 1903 by Charles Thompson and Hans Kaufmann

Bident Mountain is a 3,084-metre (10,118 ft) summit in Banff National Park, Alberta, Canada. With only 103 m (338 ft) prominence, Bident Mountain together with Quadra Mountain form an imposing wall in the Canadian Rockies and act as subpeaks of Mount Fay. Bident was first climbed in 1903 by Charles Thompson and Hans Kaufmann.

Bident Mountain has the shape of a bident, hence the name.

Bident Mountain forms the west buttress of Consolation Pass with Mount Bell forming the east buttress. These two peaks rise above the head of Consolation Valley.

== Geology ==
Like other mountains in Banff Park, Bident Mountain is composed of sedimentary rock laid down during the Precambrian to Jurassic periods. Formed in shallow seas, this sedimentary rock was pushed east and over the top of younger rock during the Laramide orogeny.

== Climate ==
Based on the Köppen climate classification, Bident Mountain is located in a subarctic climate zone with cold, snowy winters, and mild summers. Winter temperatures can drop below −20 °C with wind chill factors below −30 °C.

== See also ==
- List of mountains in the Canadian Rockies
