= Remote Mountain =

Mountain in British Columbia, Canada

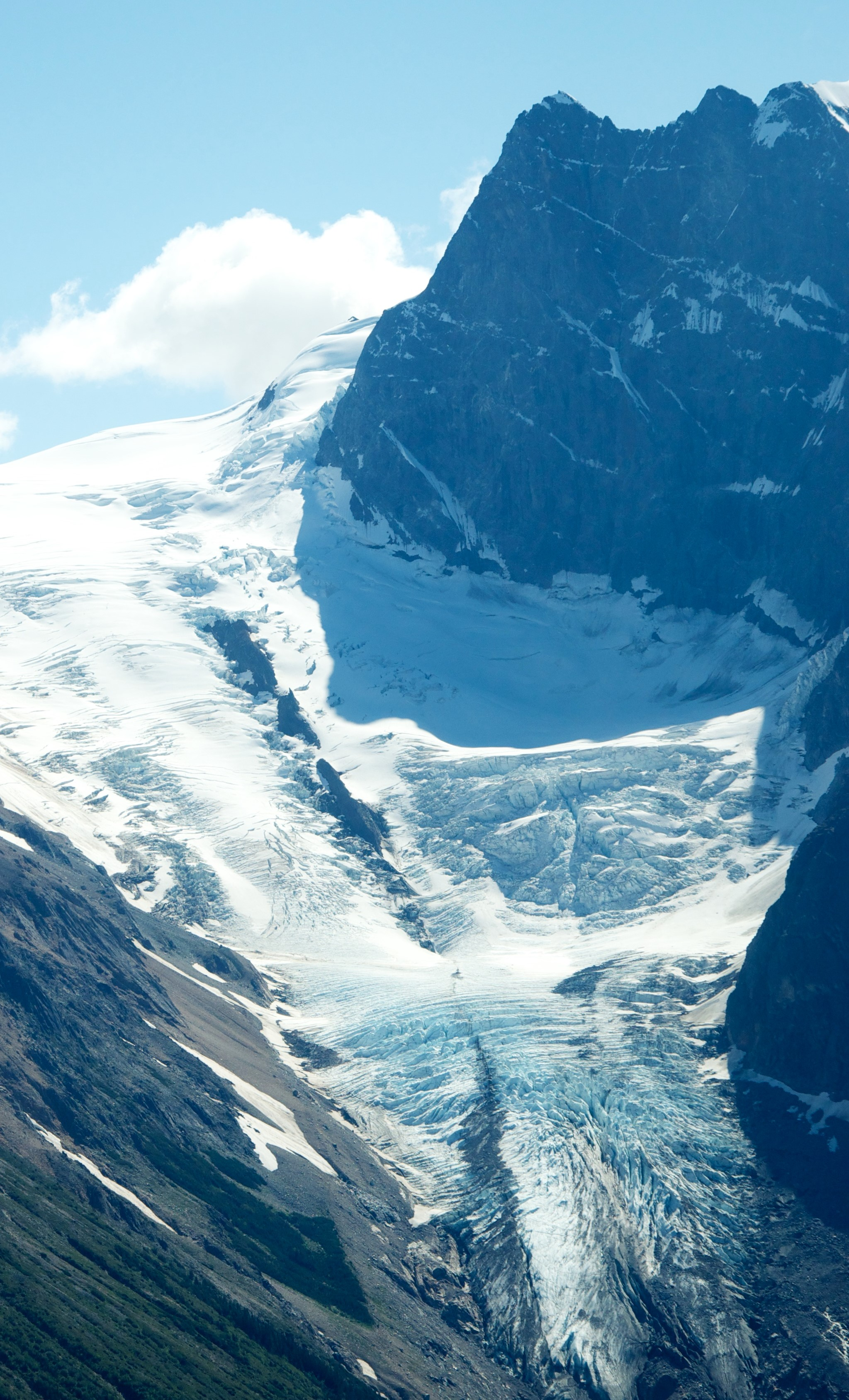
- North aspect, with Fan Glacier

Highest point
- Elevation: 3,038 m (9,967 ft)
- Prominence: 708 m (2,323 ft)
- Parent peak: Mount Bell (3,269 m)
- Isolation: 7.9 km (4.9 mi)
- Listing: Mountains of British Columbia
- Coordinates: 51°27′48″N 125°31′12″W

Geography
- Location within British Columbia Location within Canada
- Location: British Columbia, Canada
- District: Range 2 Coast Land District
- Parent range: Coast Mountains; Waddington Range
- Topo map: NTS 92N5 Klinaklini Glacier

Remote Mountain is a 3,038-metre (9,967-foot) summit located in British Columbia, Canada.

== Description ==
Remote Mountain is set in the northwest corner of the Waddington Range in a remote wilderness area that few visit. Remote Mountain is located 298 km (185 mi) northwest of Vancouver and 20 km (12 mi) northwest of Mount Waddington, which is the highest peak of the entire Coast Mountains range. Precipitation runoff from Remote Mountain's slopes drains into the Klinaklini River. Topographic relief is significant as the summit rises over 2,600 meters (8,500 feet) above the river in 8 kilometers (5.0 miles) and the north face is a 700-meter-high (2,300-foot) rock wall above the Fan Glacier. The mountain was named by Don Munday as identified in the 1933 Canadian Alpine Journal and the toponym was officially adopted on April 6, 1950, by the Geographical Names Board of Canada.

== Climate ==
Based on the Köppen climate classification, Remote Mountain is located in the marine west coast climate zone. Most weather fronts originate in the Pacific Ocean and travel east toward the Coast Mountains where they are forced upward by the range (Orographic lift), causing them to drop their moisture in the form of rain or snowfall. As a result, the Coast Mountains experience high precipitation, especially during the winter months in the form of snowfall. Temperatures can drop below −20 °C with wind chill factors below −30 °C. This climate supports the Fan Glacier and unnamed glaciers which surround the slopes of Remote Mountain.

== See also ==
- Geography of British Columbia
