= Bravo Peak =

Mountain in British Columbia, Canada

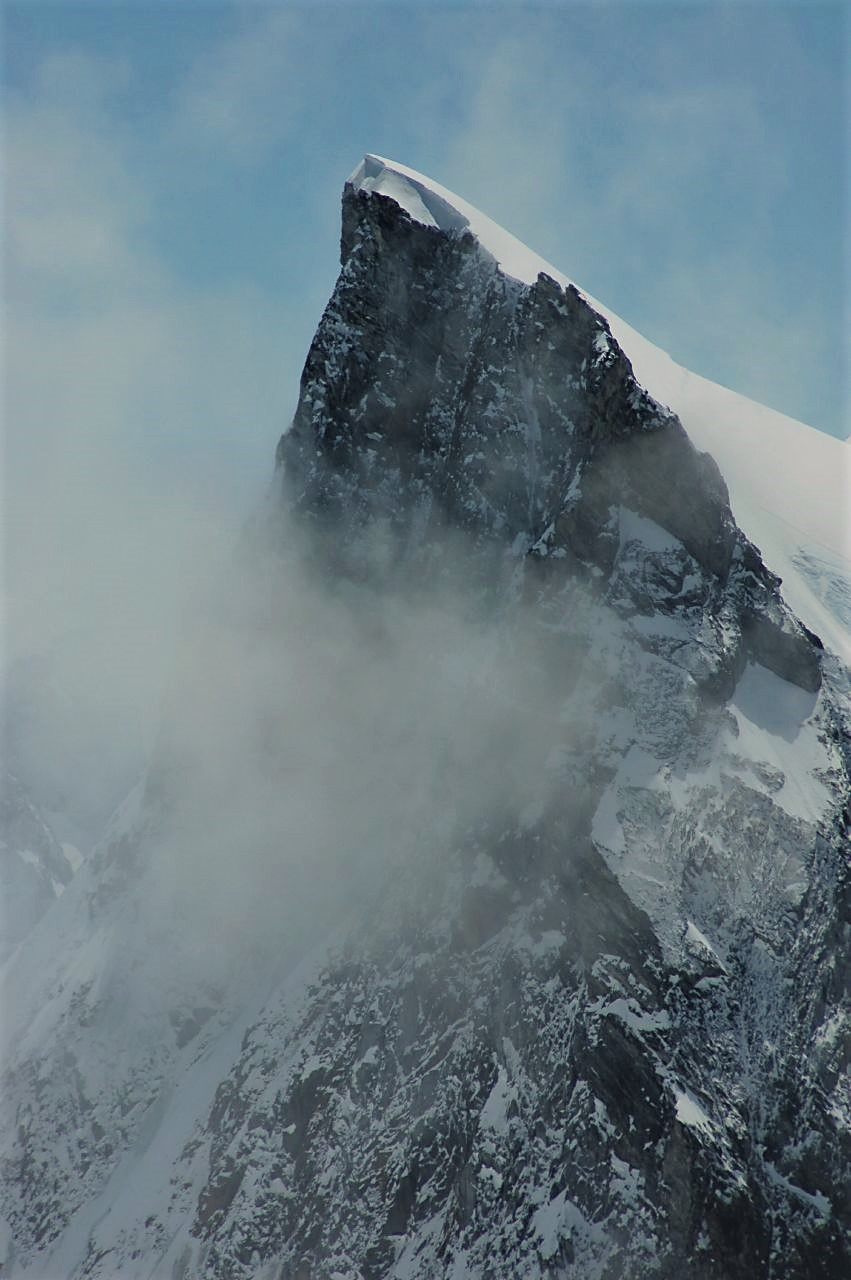
- Northwest aspect

Highest point
- Elevation: 3,105 m (10,187 ft)
- Prominence: 107 m (351 ft)
- Parent peak: Spearman Peak (3,370 m)
- Isolation: 0.9 km (0.56 mi)
- Listing: Mountains of British Columbia
- Coordinates: 51°21′56″N 125°13′56″W

Geography
- Location within British Columbia Location within Canada
- Interactive map of Bravo Peak
- Location: British Columbia, Canada
- District: Range 2 Coast Land District
- Parent range: Coast Mountains; Waddington Range
- Topo map: NTS 92N6 Mount Waddington

Bravo Peak is a 3,105-metre (10,187-foot) summit located in British Columbia, Canada.

== Description ==
Bravo Peak is situated in the Waddington Range of the Coast Mountains, in a remote wilderness area that few visit. Bravo Peak is set 155 km (96 mi) north of the community of Campbell River and 2.35 km (1.46 mi) southeast of Mount Waddington, the highest peak of the entire Coast Mountains range. Other neighbors include Mount Munday, Grenelle Mountain and Spearman Peak, which is the nearest higher neighbor. Precipitation runoff from Bravo Peak drains to Tiedemann Creek → Homathko River → Bute Inlet. Topographic relief is significant as the summit rises over 900 meters (2,950 feet) above the Tiedemann Glacier in 0.6 kilometer (0.37 mile).

== History ==
The peak's name was originally identified on mountaineer Don Munday's 1934 map, and appeared in subsequent climber's guides before being officially adopted May 1, 1978, by the Geographical Names Board of Canada.

An ascent of the summit made in July 1950 by Allen Steck, William W. Dunmire, Oscar Cook, Richard Houston, James Wilson, Philip Bettler, William Long and Raymond de Saussure was possibly the first ascent.

== Climate ==
Based on the Köppen climate classification, Bravo Peak has an ice cap climate. Most weather fronts originate in the Pacific Ocean, and travel east toward the Coast Mountains where they are forced upward by the range (Orographic lift), causing them to drop their moisture in the form of rain or snowfall. As a result, the Coast Mountains experience high precipitation, especially during the winter months in the form of snowfall. Temperatures can drop below −20 °C with wind chill factors below −30 °C. This climate supports the Bravo and Tiedemann glaciers which surround the slopes of Bravo Peak.

== Gallery ==
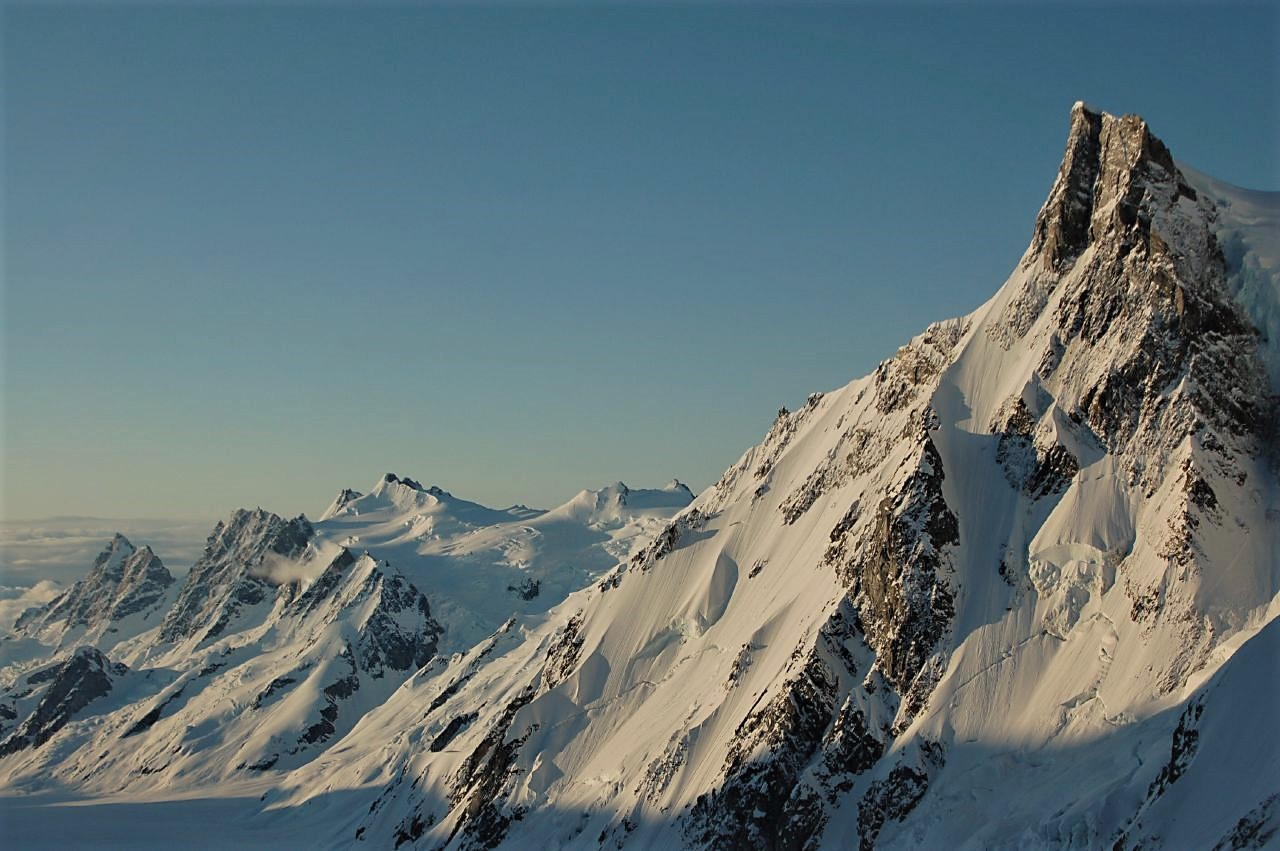
Bravo Peak (right) and Grenelle Mountain in the background

== See also ==
- Geography of British Columbia
