= Grenelle Mountain =

Mountain summit in British Columbia, Canada

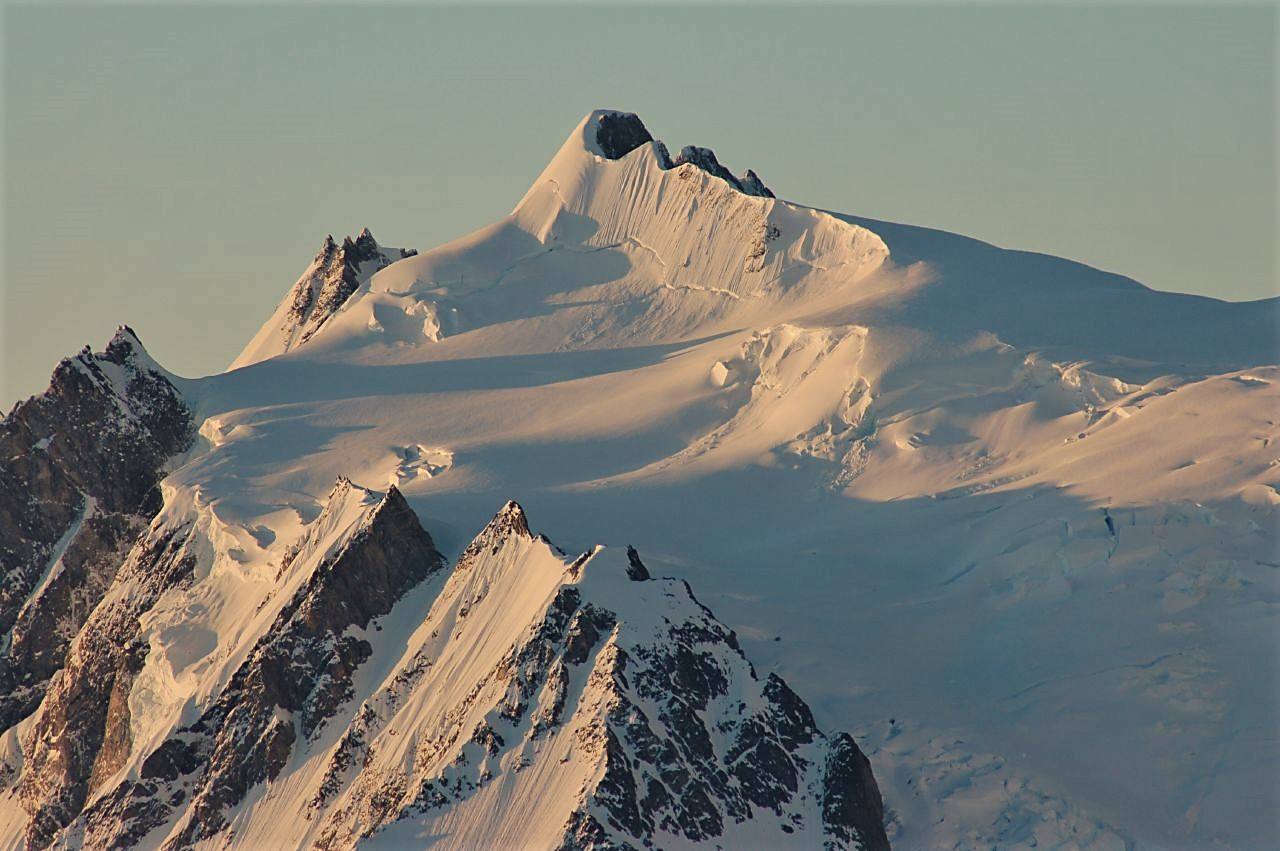
- Northwest aspect

Highest point
- Elevation: 3,047 m (9,997 ft)
- Prominence: 255 m (837 ft)
- Parent peak: Mount Waddington (4,019 m)
- Isolation: 3.06 km (1.90 mi)
- Listing: Mountains of British Columbia
- Coordinates: 51°19′16″N 125°08′19″W

Geography
- Location within British Columbia Location within Canada
- Interactive map of Grenelle Mountain
- Location: British Columbia, Canada
- District: Range 2 Coast Land District
- Parent range: Coast Mountains; Waddington Range
- Topo map: NTS 92N6 Mount Waddington

Climbing
- First ascent: 1950
- Easiest route: Expedition

Grenelle Mountain is a 3,047-metre (9,997-foot) mountain summit located in British Columbia, Canada.

== Description ==
Grenelle Mountain is a glaciated peak situated in the Waddington Range of the Coast Mountains, in a remote wilderness area that few visit. Grenelle Mountain is set 150 km (93 mi) north of the community of Campbell River and 10 km (6.2 mi) southeast of Mount Waddington, the highest peak of the entire Coast Mountains range. Other neighbors between Waddington and Grenelle include Spearman Peak, Mount Munday, Arabesque Peaks and Bravo Peak. Precipitation runoff and glacier meltwater from Grenelle Mountain drains to Bute Inlet via the Homathko River. Topographic relief is significant as the summit rises 1,500 m (4,920 ft) above the Tiedemann Glacier in 2 km (1.2 mi).

== History ==
The name "Crenelle Mountain" was originally submitted in January 1928 by mountaineer Don Munday and officially adopted 19 December 1968. Munday so-named it because of its likeness to crenelles and battlements. The spelling "Grenelle", although misconstrued, is firmly entrenched in the mountaineering community, according to April 1978 advice from Dr. Glenn Woodsworth, Geological Survey of Canada and Alpine Club of Canada representative to the Geographical Names Board of Canada. The "Grenelle Mountain" toponym was officially adopted May 1, 1978, by the Geographical Names Board of Canada.

The first ascent of the summit was made in July 1950 by Allen Steck, William W. Dunmire, Oscar Cook, Richard Houston, James Wilson, Philip Bettler, William Long and Raymond de Saussure.

== Climate ==
Based on the Köppen climate classification, Grenelle Mountain has an ice cap climate. Most weather fronts originate in the Pacific Ocean, and travel east toward the Coast Mountains where they are forced upward by the range (Orographic lift), causing them to drop their moisture in the form of rain or snowfall. As a result, the Coast Mountains experience high precipitation, especially during the winter months in the form of snowfall. Temperatures can drop below −20 °C with wind chill factors below −30 °C. This climate supports the Waddington, Splendour and Tiedemann glaciers which cover the slopes of Grenelle Mountain.

== See also ==
- Geography of British Columbia
