= Parapet Peak (Garibaldi Provincial Park) =

Mountain in the country of Canada

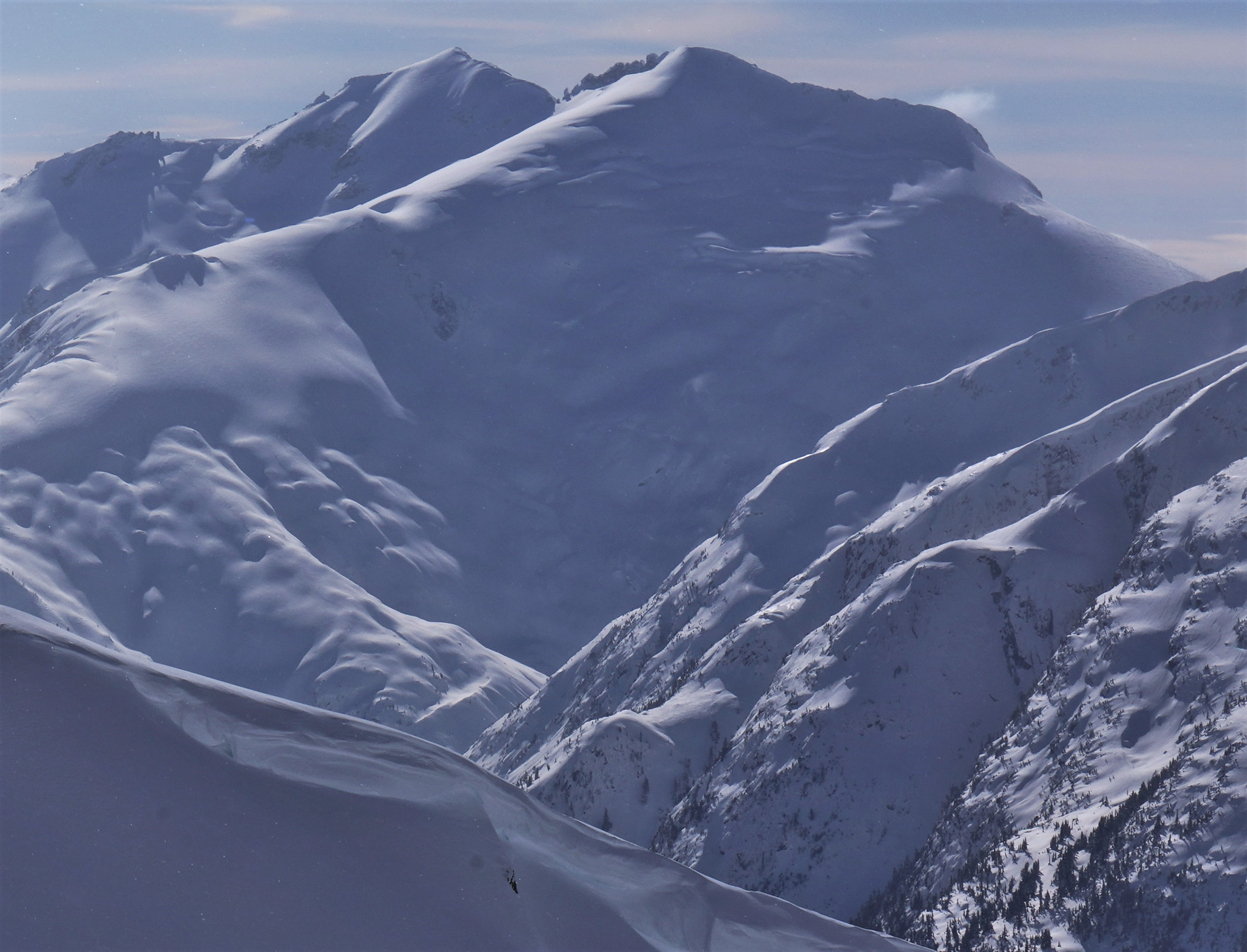
- North aspect in winter (Isosceles Peak behind, left)

Highest point
- Elevation: 2,463 m (8,081 ft)
- Prominence: 66 m (217 ft)
- Parent peak: Isosceles Peak
- Isolation: 0.77 km (0.48 mi)
- Listing: Mountains of British Columbia
- Coordinates: 49°54′18″N 122°54′17″W

Naming
- Etymology: Parapet

Geography
- Location within British Columbia Location within Canada
- Interactive map of Parapet Peak
- Country: Canada
- Province: British Columbia
- District: New Westminster Land District
- Protected area: Garibaldi Provincial Park
- Parent range: Garibaldi Ranges; Coast Mountains
- Topo map: NTS 92G15 Mamquam Mountain

Climbing
- First ascent: August 1922

Parapet Peak is a 2,463-metre (8,081-foot) mountain summit located in British Columbia, Canada.

== Description ==
Parapet Peak is set within Garibaldi Provincial Park and is part of the Garibaldi Ranges of the Coast Mountains. It is situated 68 km (42 mi) north of Vancouver and 0.77 km (0 mi) north of Isosceles Peak, the nearest higher neighbor. Precipitation runoff and glacial meltwater from the south side of the peak drains into the headwaters of the Pitt River, whereas the northern slope drains to Cheakamus Lake via Isosceles Creek. Topographic relief is significant as the summit rises 1,260 meters (4,134 feet) above Pitt River in 3 kilometers (1.9 miles).

== History ==
The first ascent of Parapet Peak was made in August 1922 by Don Munday, his wife Phyllis Munday, Neal Carter, Harold O'Connor, and Clausen Thompson. The mountain's toponym was officially adopted on September 2, 1930, by the Geographical Names Board of Canada.

== Climate ==
Based on the Köppen climate classification, Parapet Peak is located in the marine west coast climate zone of western North America. Most weather fronts originate in the Pacific Ocean and travel east toward the Coast Mountains where they are forced upward by the range (orographic lift), causing them to drop their moisture in the form of rain or snowfall. As a result, the Coast Mountains experience high precipitation, especially during the winter months in the form of snowfall. Winter temperatures can drop below −20 °C with wind chill factors below −30 °C. This climate supports the Isosceles Glacier on the east slope, the Gray Glacier on the north slope, and an unnamed glacier on the west slope of the peak.

== Gallery ==
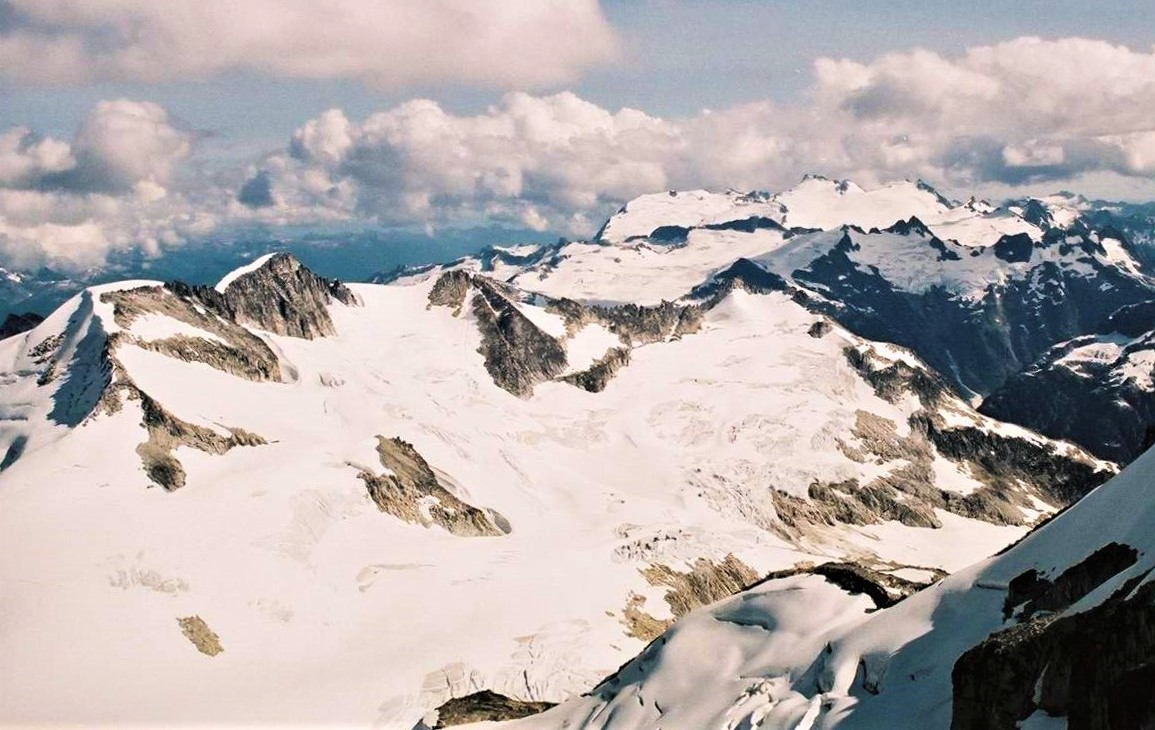
Parapet and Isoscoles peaks at left edge, viewed from Mount Carr

== See also ==
- Geography of British Columbia
