= Jubilee Mountain =

Mountain in British Columbia, Canada

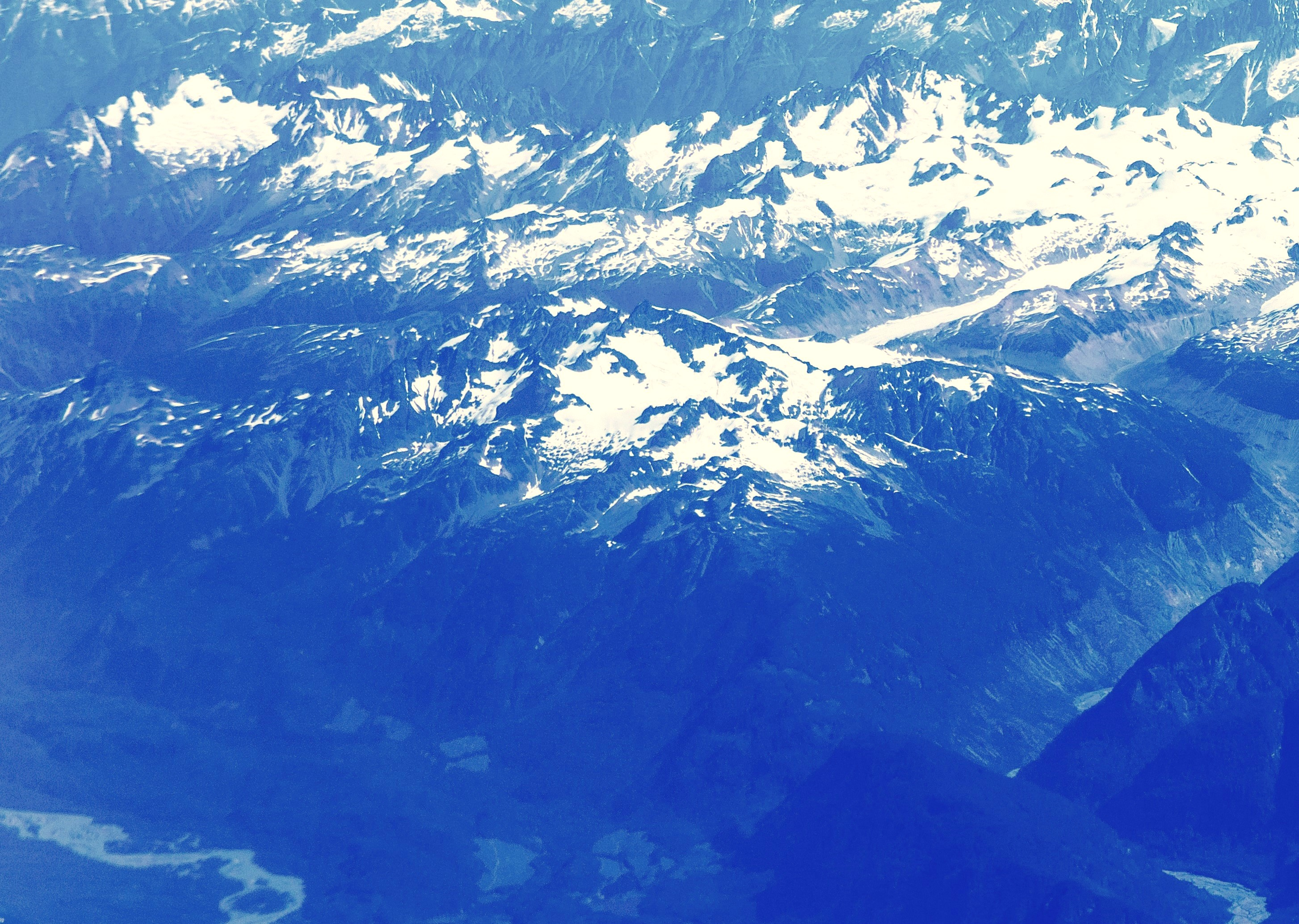
- South aspect, centered

Highest point
- Elevation: 2,751 m (9,026 ft)
- Prominence: 931 m (3,054 ft)
- Parent peak: Mount Waddington (4,019 m)
- Isolation: 12.41 km (7.71 mi)
- Listing: Mountains of British Columbia
- Coordinates: 51°16′18″N 125°31′50″W

Geography
- Location within British Columbia Location within Canada
- Interactive map of Jubilee Mountain
- Location: British Columbia, Canada
- District: Range 2 Coast Land District
- Parent range: Coast Mountains; Waddington Range
- Topo map: NTS 92N5 Klinaklini Glacier

Climbing
- First ascent: 1931

Jubilee Mountain is a 2,751-metre (9,026-foot) mountain summit in British Columbia, Canada.

== Description ==
Jubilee Mountain is set in the Waddington Range north of the head of Knight Inlet in a remote wilderness area that few visit. It is located 282 km (175 mi) northwest of Vancouver and 13 km (8.1 mi) southwest of Mount Waddington, which is the highest peak of the entire Coast Mountains range. Jubilee Mountain is highly glaciated with the Lomolo Glacier on the northwest slope, Confederation Glacier on the northeast slope, Jubilee Glacier on the east slope, and Chasm Glacier on the south. The Franklin Glacier terminus is at the southeast base of the mountain. Precipitation runoff and glacial meltwater from the mountain's slopes drains into the Franklin River and tributaries of the Klinaklini River. Topographic relief is significant as the summit rises 2,530 m (8,300 ft) above Devereux Lake in four kilometers (2.5 miles).

== History ==
The mountain was named in 1927 by Don Munday to commemorate the 60-year jubilee of Canada's Confederation (1867–1927) and the toponym was officially adopted on October 5, 1960, by the Geographical Names Board of Canada.

The first ascent of the summit was made in 1931 by Don Munday and his wife, Phyllis.

== Climate ==
Based on the Köppen climate classification, Jubilee Mountain is located in the marine west coast climate zone. Most weather fronts originate in the Pacific Ocean and travel east toward the Coast Mountains where they are forced upward by the range (Orographic lift), causing them to drop their moisture in the form of rain or snowfall. As a result, the Coast Mountains experience high precipitation, especially during the winter months in the form of snowfall. Winter temperatures can drop below −20 °C with wind chill factors below −30 °C. This climate supports several glaciers which surround the slopes of Jubilee Mountain.

== See also ==
- Geography of British Columbia
