= Spearman Peak =

Mountain in British Columbia, Canada

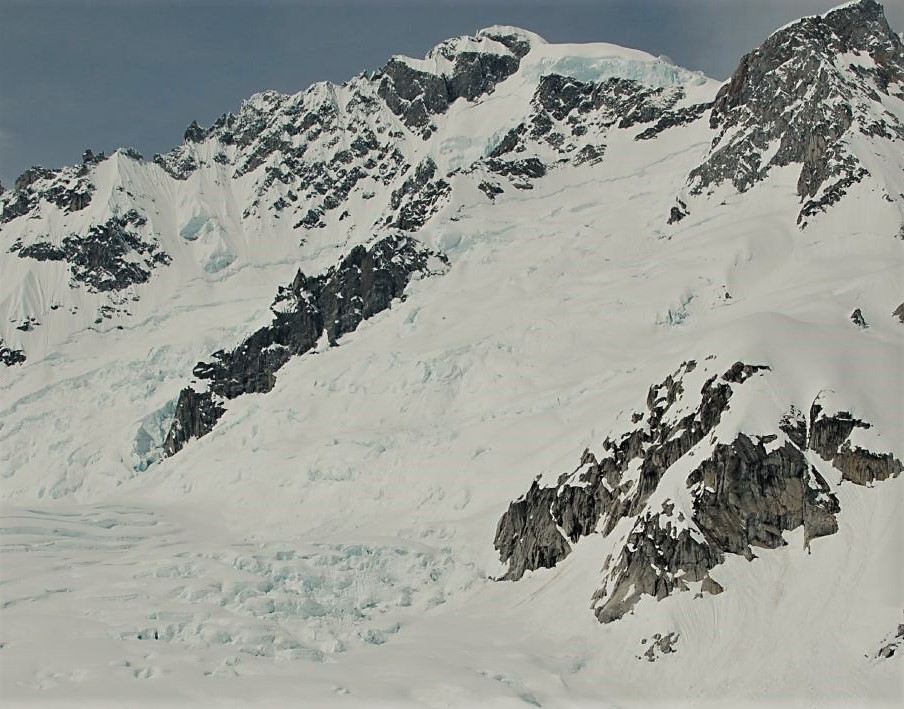
- East aspect

Highest point
- Elevation: 3,365 m (11,040 ft)
- Prominence: 130 m (427 ft)
- Parent peak: Mount Waddington (4,019 m)
- Isolation: 1.2 km (0.75 mi)
- Listing: Mountains of British Columbia
- Coordinates: 51°21′35″N 125°14′29″W

Geography
- Location within British Columbia Location within Canada
- Interactive map of Spearman Peak
- Location: British Columbia, Canada
- District: Range 2 Coast Land District
- Parent range: Coast Mountains; Waddington Range
- Topo map: NTS 92N6 Mount Waddington

Spearman Peak is a 3,365-metre (11,040-foot) summit located in British Columbia, Canada.

== Description ==
Spearman Peak is situated in the Waddington Range of the Coast Mountains, in a remote wilderness area that few visit. Spearman Peak is set 155 km (96 mi) north of the community of Campbell River and 2 km (1.2 mi) southeast of Mount Waddington, the highest peak of the entire Coast Mountains range. Other neighbors include Mount Munday, Grenelle Mountain and Bravo Peak. Precipitation runoff from Spearman Peak's east slope drains to Bute Inlet via Bravo Glacier → Tiedemann Glacier → Homathko River; and from the west slope to Knight Inlet via Corridor Glacier → Franklin Glacier → Franklin River. Topographic relief is significant as the summit rises 1,365 meters (4,480 feet) above the Tiedemann Glacier in 2.5 kilometers (1.55 mile). The peak's toponym was officially adopted May 1, 1978, by the Geographical Names Board of Canada.

== Climate ==
Based on the Köppen climate classification, Spearman Peak has an ice cap climate. Most weather fronts originate in the Pacific Ocean, and travel east toward the Coast Mountains where they are forced upward by the range (Orographic lift), causing them to drop their moisture in the form of rain or snowfall. As a result, the Coast Mountains experience high precipitation, especially during the winter months in the form of snowfall. Temperatures can drop below −20 °C with wind chill factors below −30 °C. This climate supports the Corridor, Bravo and Tiedemann glaciers which surround the slopes of Spearman Peak.

== See also ==
- Geography of British Columbia
