= Whitemantle Range =

Mountain range in British Columbia, Canada

- Location within British Columbia

Highest point
- Peak: Whitemantle Mountain
- Elevation: 2,985 m (9,793 ft)
- Coordinates: 51°09′50″N 125°14′20″W

Geography
- Country: Canada
- Province: British Columbia
- Parent range: Pacific Ranges

The Whitemantle Range is a subrange of the Pacific Ranges of the Coast Mountains in British Columbia. Located between the heads of Bute Inlet on the east and Knight Inlet on the west, it is extremely rugged and glaciated. Its highest summit is Whitemantle Mountain 2,985 m (9,793 ft).

The range is approximately 3,400 km^{2} (1,300 sq mi) in area and just south of the much higher and even more rugged Waddington Range, which is the highest part of the Pacific Ranges and also of the Coast Mountains. East across the canyon-valley of the Homathko River is the Homathko Icefield.
