= Mount Habrich =

Mountain in British Columbia, Canada

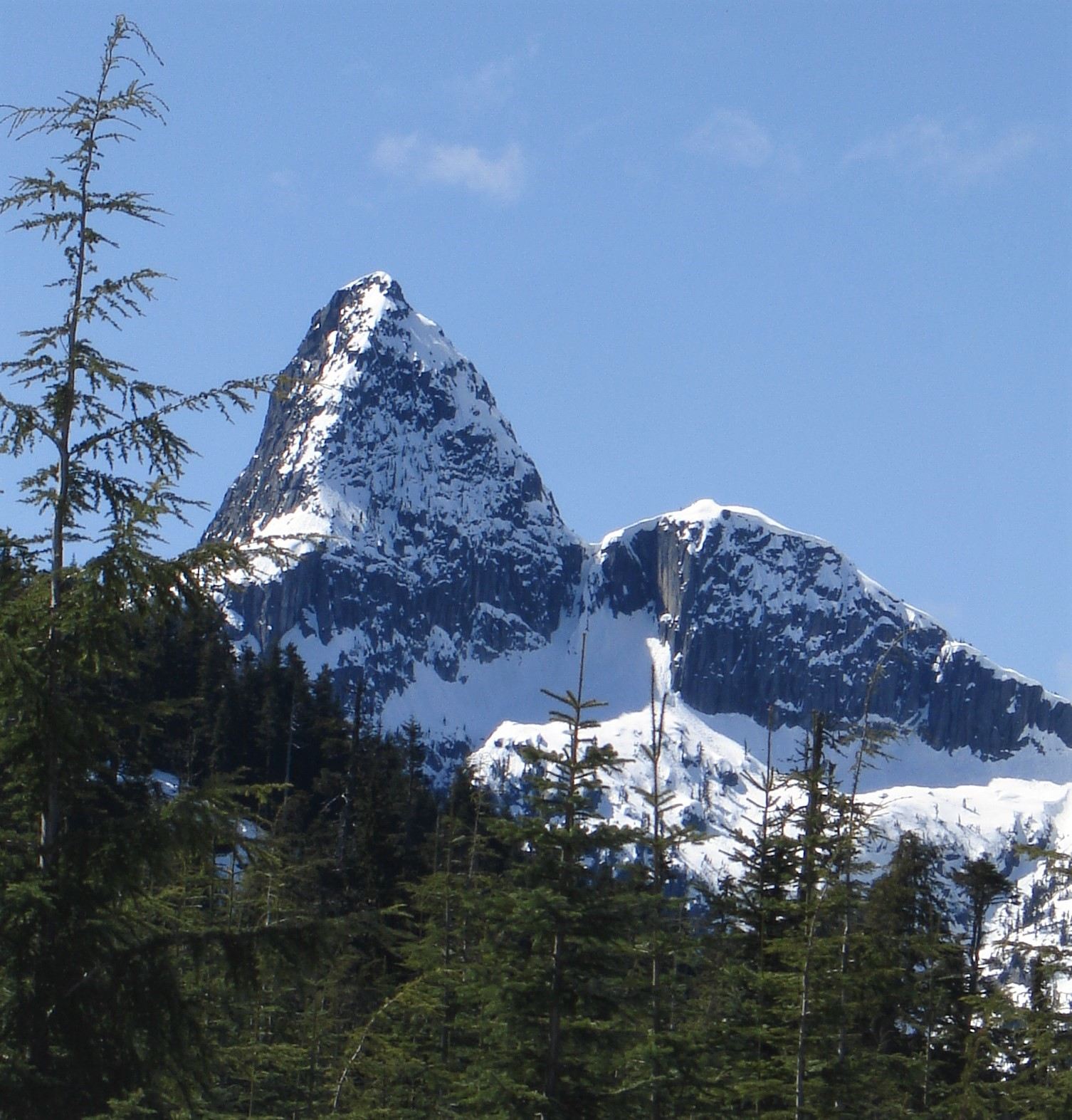
- North aspect

Highest point
- Elevation: 1,792 m (5,879 ft)
- Prominence: 312 m (1,024 ft)
- Parent peak: Sky Pilot Mountain (2,031 m)
- Isolation: 2.58 km (1.60 mi)
- Listing: Mountains of British Columbia
- Coordinates: 49°39′31″N 123°04′59″W

Naming
- Etymology: Samuel A. Habrich

Geography
- Location within British Columbia Location within Canada
- Interactive map of Mount Habrich
- Country: Canada
- Province: British Columbia
- District: New Westminster Land District
- Parent range: North Shore Mountains; Coast Mountains
- Topo map: NTS 92G11 Squamish

Geology
- Mountain type: Horn
- Rock type: Granodiorite

Climbing
- First ascent: 1912 by Don Munday and party
- Easiest route: class 3-4 via NE Ridge

Mount Habrich is a mountain summit located in British Columbia, Canada.

== Description ==
Mount Habrich is a 1,792-meter-elevation (5,879-foot) granitic horn situated 6 kilometers (3.7 miles) southeast of Squamish and 2.6 kilometers (1.6 miles) north of line parent Sky Pilot Mountain. It is part of the North Shore Mountains which are a subrange of the Coast Mountains. Precipitation runoff from the peak drains north into the Stawamus River, and southwest to Howe Sound via Shannon Creek. Mount Habrich is more notable for its steep rise above local terrain than for its absolute elevation. Topographic relief is significant as the summit rises over 1,200 meters (3,900 feet) above the river in one kilometer (0.62 miles), and 700 meters (2,300 feet) above the creek in one-half kilometer (0.3 mile).

== History ==
The first ascent of the summit was made in July 1912 by Don Munday, Fred Smith and C. Field via the northeast ridge. The first ascent party named the mountain "Eagle Head" for the shape of its profile as seen from Sky Pilot. The mountain's present toponym was officially adopted June 2, 1955, by the Geographical Names Board of Canada to remember Samuel A. Habrich, a local prospector who built trails in this area in the early 1900s.

== Climate ==
Based on the Köppen climate classification, Mount Habrich is located in the marine west coast climate zone of western North America. Most weather fronts originate in the Pacific Ocean, and travel east toward the Coast Mountains where they are forced upward by the range (Orographic lift), causing them to drop their moisture in the form of rain or snowfall. As a result, the Coast Mountains experience high precipitation, especially during the winter months in the form of snowfall. Temperatures in winter can drop below −20 °C with wind chill factors below −30 °C.

== Climbing ==
Climbing routes on Mt. Habrich:

- Northeast Ridge - class 3-4 scrambling
- Life In Space - class 5.10b
- Life On Earth - class 5.10c
- Escape Velocity - class 5.9
- Solar System - class 5.10a

== Gallery ==
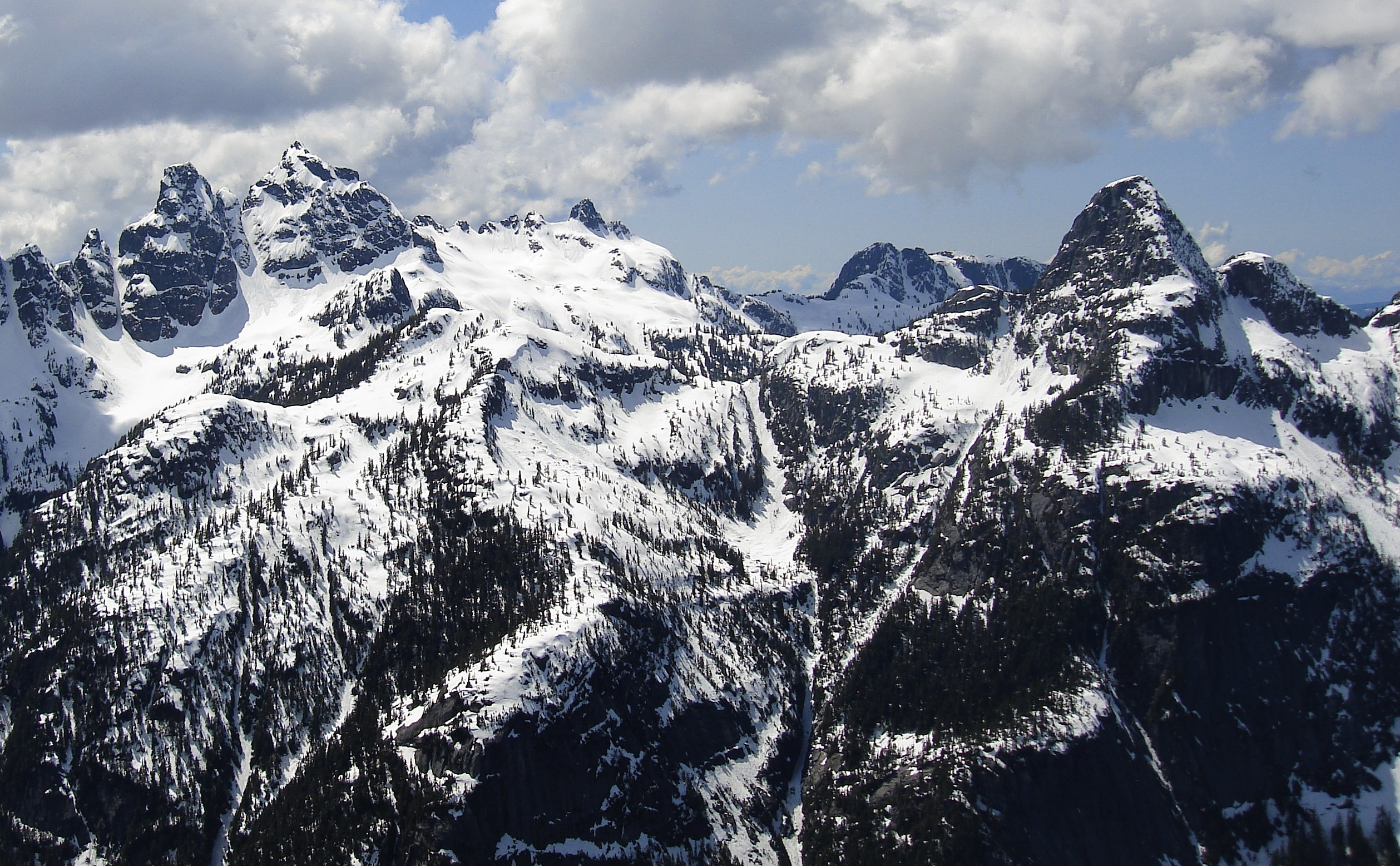
Mount Habrich (right) and parent Sky Pilot (left)

== See also ==
- Geography of British Columbia
