= Isosceles Peak =

Mountain in the country of Canada

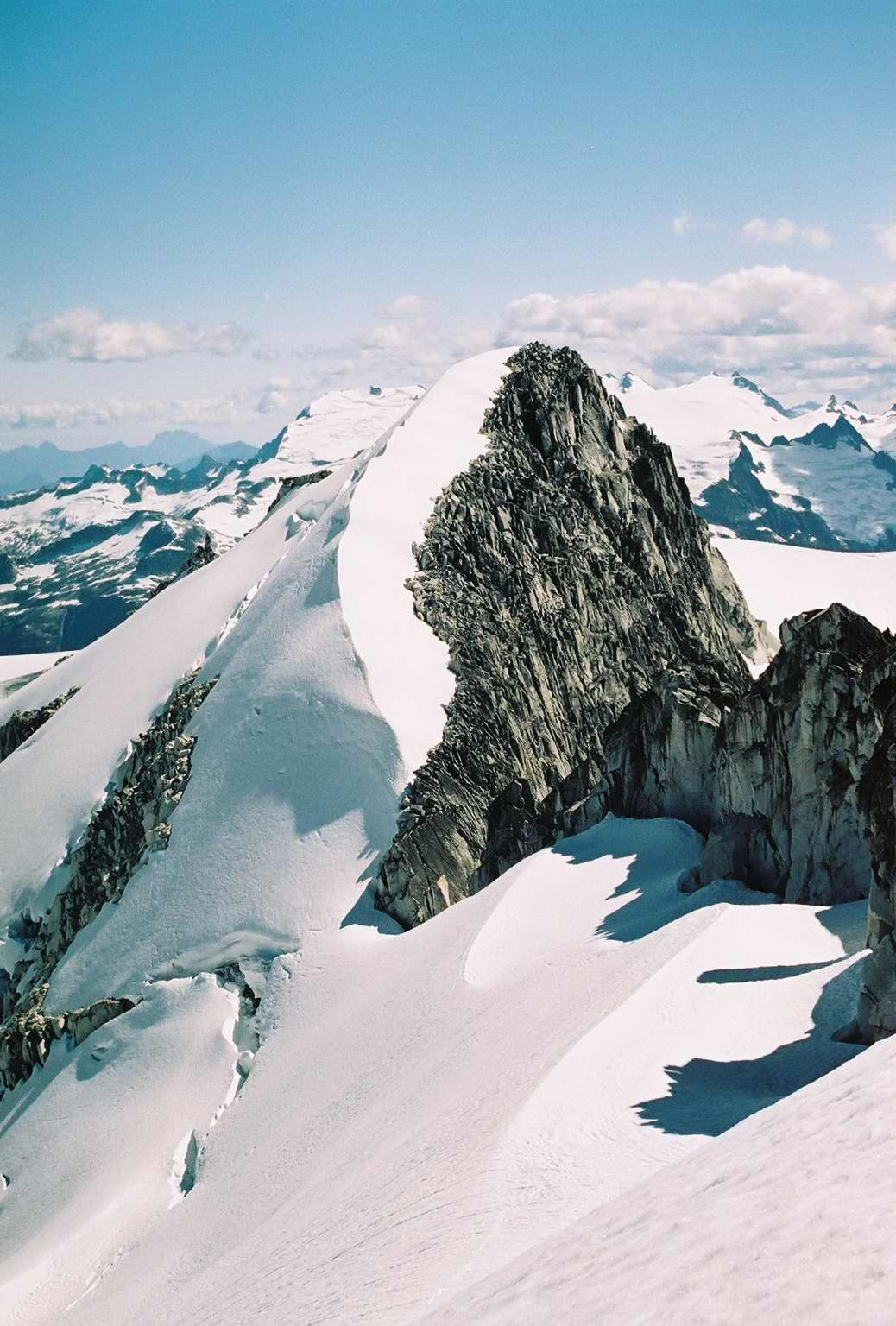
- North aspect

Highest point
- Elevation: 2,488 m (8,163 ft)
- Prominence: 442 m (1,450 ft)
- Parent peak: Castle Towers Mountain
- Isolation: 3.1 km (1.9 mi)
- Listing: Mountains of British Columbia
- Coordinates: 49°53′55″N 122°54′06″W

Naming
- Etymology: Isosceles triangle

Geography
- Location within British Columbia Location within Canada
- Interactive map of Isosceles Peak
- Country: Canada
- Province: British Columbia
- District: New Westminster Land District
- Protected area: Garibaldi Provincial Park
- Parent range: Garibaldi Ranges; Coast Mountains
- Topo map: NTS 92G15 Mamquam Mountain

Climbing
- First ascent: August 1922

Isosceles Peak is a 2,488-metre (8,163-foot) mountain summit located in British Columbia, Canada.

== Description ==
Isosceles Peak is set within Garibaldi Provincial Park and is part of the Garibaldi Ranges of the Coast Mountains. It is situated 67 km (42 mi) north of Vancouver and 3.53 km (2 mi) southeast of Mount Carr, the nearest higher neighbor. Precipitation runoff and glacial meltwater from the south side of the peak drains into headwaters of Pitt River, and the northern slope drains to Cheakamus Lake via Isosceles Creek. Topographic relief is significant as the summit rises 1,700 meters (5,577 feet) above Pitt River in 4 kilometers (2.5 miles).

== History ==
The first ascent of Isosceles Peak was made in August 1922 by Don Munday, his wife Phyllis Munday, Neal Carter, Harold O'Connor, and Clausen Thompson.

The peak's descriptive name refers to its shape similar to an isosceles triangle. The toponym was officially adopted September 2, 1930, by the Geographical Names Board of Canada.

== Climate ==
Based on the Köppen climate classification, Isosceles Peak is located in the marine west coast climate zone of western North America. Most weather fronts originate in the Pacific Ocean, and travel east toward the Coast Mountains where they are forced upward by the range (Orographic lift), causing them to drop their moisture in the form of rain or snowfall. As a result, the Coast Mountains experience high precipitation, especially during the winter months in the form of snowfall. Winter temperatures can drop below −20 °C with wind chill factors below −30 °C. This climate supports the Isosceles Glacier on the northeast slope and unnamed glaciers surrounding the peak.

== See also ==
- Geography of British Columbia
