= Mount Bell (British Columbia) =

Mountain in British Columbia, Canada

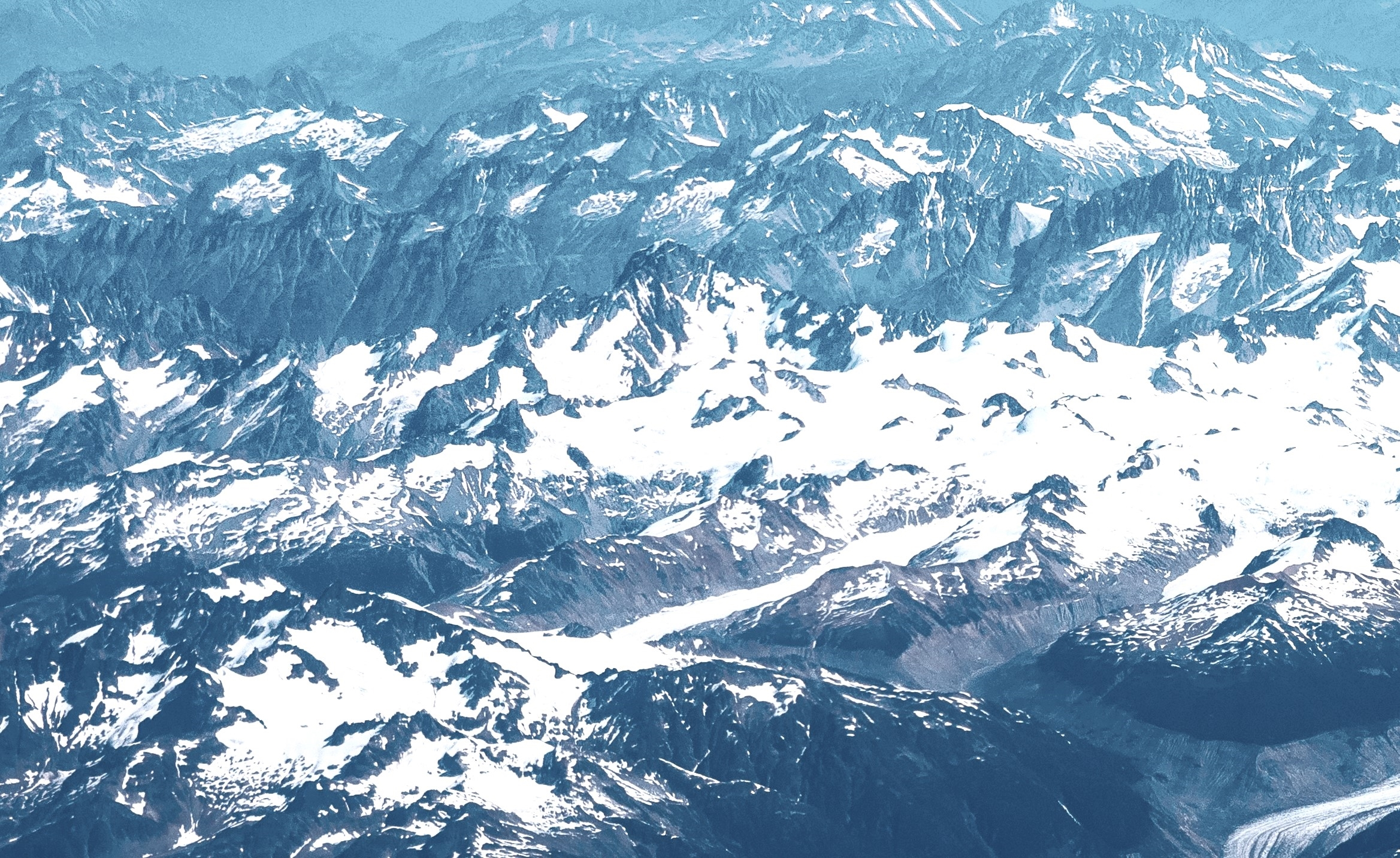
- South aspect, centered

Highest point
- Elevation: 3,269 m (10,725 ft)
- Prominence: 799 m (2,621 ft)
- Parent peak: Mount Waddington (4,019 m)
- Isolation: 9.96 km (6.19 mi)
- Listing: Mountains of British Columbia
- Coordinates: 51°24′52″N 125°25′49″W

Geography
- Location within British Columbia Location within Canada
- Interactive map of Mount Bell
- Location: British Columbia, Canada
- District: Range 2 Coast Land District
- Parent range: Coast Mountains; Waddington Range
- Topo map: NTS 92N6 Mount Waddington

Climbing
- First ascent: 1936

Mount Bell is a 3,269-metre (10,725-foot) mountain summit in British Columbia, Canada.

== Description ==
Mount Bell is set in the Waddington Range in a remote wilderness area that few visit. Mount Bell is located 290 km (180 mi) northwest of Vancouver and 7.46 km (4.64 mi) northwest of Mount Waddington, which is the highest peak of the entire Coast Mountains range. Mount Bell is highly glaciated with the Remote Glacier on the northwest slope, Cannonade Glacier on the northeast slope, Bell Glacier to the east, and Dorothy Glacier to the south. Precipitation runoff and glacial meltwater from Mount Bell's slopes drains into tributaries of the Klinaklini River. Topographic relief is significant as the summit rises 2,270 meters (7,450 feet) above Bell Creek in four kilometers (2.5 miles).

== History ==
The mountain was named in 1928 by Don Munday and the toponym was officially adopted on April 3, 1928, by the Geographical Names Board of Canada to honor Dr. Frederick C. Bell (1883–1971), a founding member of the Alpine Club of Canada and club president from 1926 through 1928. Mount Bell in Aberta is also named after him.

The first ascent of the summit was made on July 26, 1936, by Bestor Robinson, Ken Austin, Raffi Bedayn, and Hervey Voge.

== Climate ==
Based on the Köppen climate classification, Mount Bell is located in the marine west coast climate zone. Most weather fronts originate in the Pacific Ocean and travel east toward the Coast Mountains where they are forced upward by the range (Orographic lift), causing them to drop their moisture in the form of rain or snowfall. As a result, the Coast Mountains experience high precipitation, especially during the winter months in the form of snowfall. Temperatures can drop below −20 °C with wind chill factors below −30 °C. This climate supports several glaciers which surround the slopes of Mount Bell.

== See also ==
- Geography of British Columbia
