= Mount Bell (Alberta) =

Mountain in Alberta, Canada

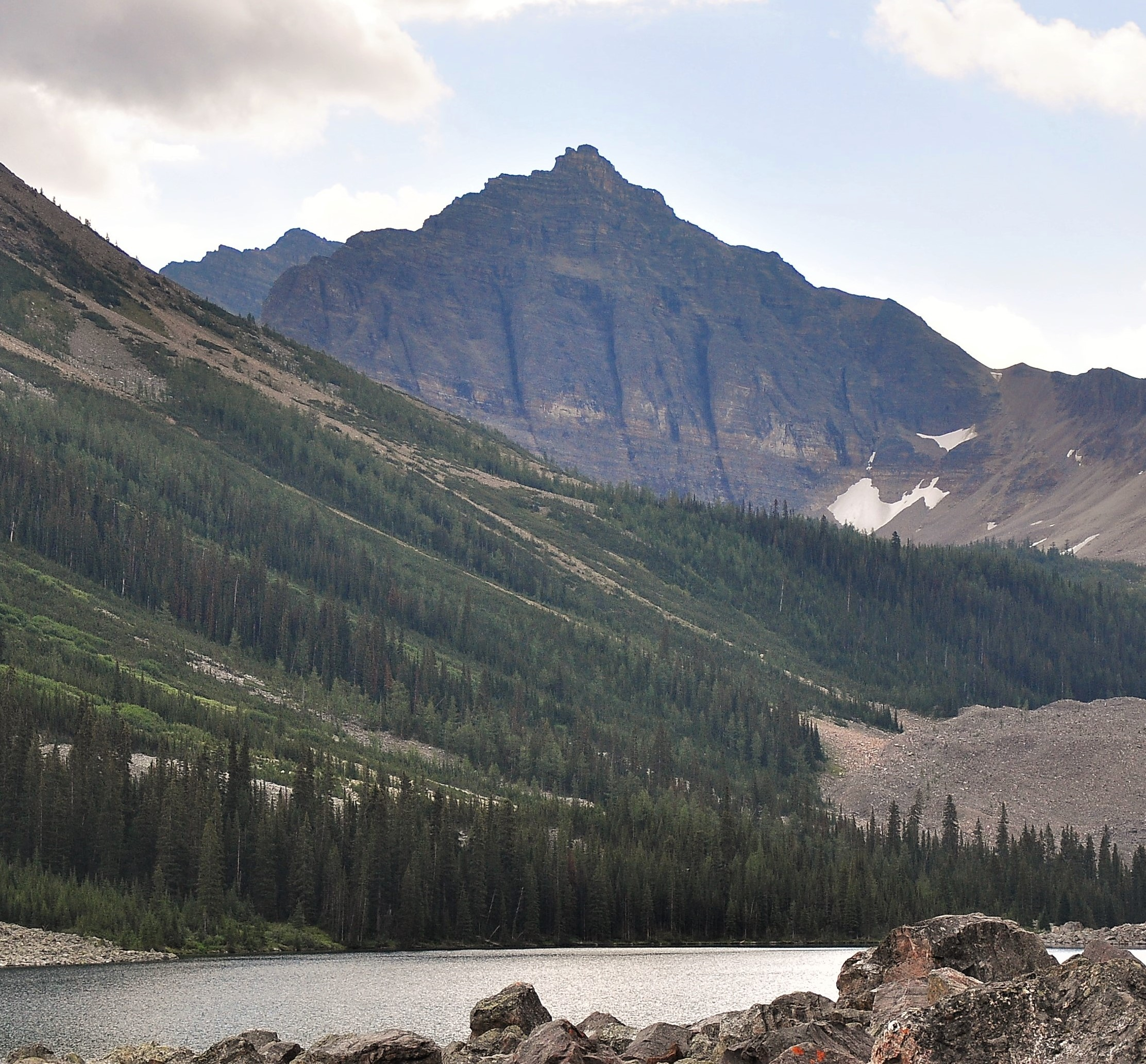
- Northwest aspect, from Consolation Lakes

Highest point
- Elevation: 2,910 m (9,550 ft)
- Prominence: 445 m (1,460 ft)
- Parent peak: Mount Temple (3,544 m)
- Isolation: 2.58 km (1.60 mi)
- Listing: Mountains of Alberta
- Coordinates: 51°17′03″N 116°06′04″W

Geography
- Location within Alberta Location within Canada
- Interactive map of Mount Bell
- Country: Canada
- Province: Alberta
- Protected area: Banff National Park
- Parent range: Bow Range; Canadian Rockies
- Topo map: NTS 82N8 Lake Louise

Geology
- Rock age: Cambrian
- Rock type: Sedimentary rock

Climbing
- First ascent: 1910
- Easiest route: Scramble

Mount Bell is a 2,910-metre (9,550 ft) summit in Alberta, Canada.

== Geography ==
Mount Bell is set within Banff National Park, in the Bow Range of the Canadian Rockies. The hamlet of Lake Louise is situated 16 kilometres (9.9 mi) to the north and the Continental Divide is 4 kilometres (2.5 mi) to the west. The nearest higher neighbor is Bident Mountain, 2.9 km (1.8 mi) to the west. Bident Mountain forms the west buttress of Consolation Pass with Mount Bell forming the east buttress. These two peaks rise above the head of Consolation Valley. Precipitation runoff from Mount Bell drains into tributaries of the Bow River. Topographic relief is significant as the north aspect rises over 830 m (2,720 ft) above Taylor Lake in one kilometre (0.6 mile) and the south aspect rises 1,000 m (3,300 ft) above Boom Lake in two km (1.2 mile). The peak is visible from the Icefields Parkway to the east.

== History ==
Originally called Mount Bellevue, the name was changed to honor Dr. Frederick Bell (1883–1971), a founding member of the Alpine Club of Canada and club president from 1926 through 1928. Mount Bell in British Columbia is also named after him. The mountain's toponym was officially adopted on April 3, 1952, by the Geographical Names Board of Canada.

The first ascent of the summit was made in 1910 by an Alpine Club of Canada party including Nora Bell, sister of Frederick Bell.

== Geology ==
Like other mountains in Banff Park, Mount Bell is composed of sedimentary rock laid down during the Precambrian to Jurassic periods. Formed in shallow seas, this sedimentary rock was pushed east and over the top of younger rock during the Laramide orogeny.

== Climate ==
Based on the Köppen climate classification, Mount Bell is located in a subarctic climate zone with cold, snowy winters, and mild summers. Winter temperatures can drop below −20 °C (−4 °F) with wind chill factors below −30 °C (−22 °F).

== See also ==
- Geography of Alberta

== Gallery ==
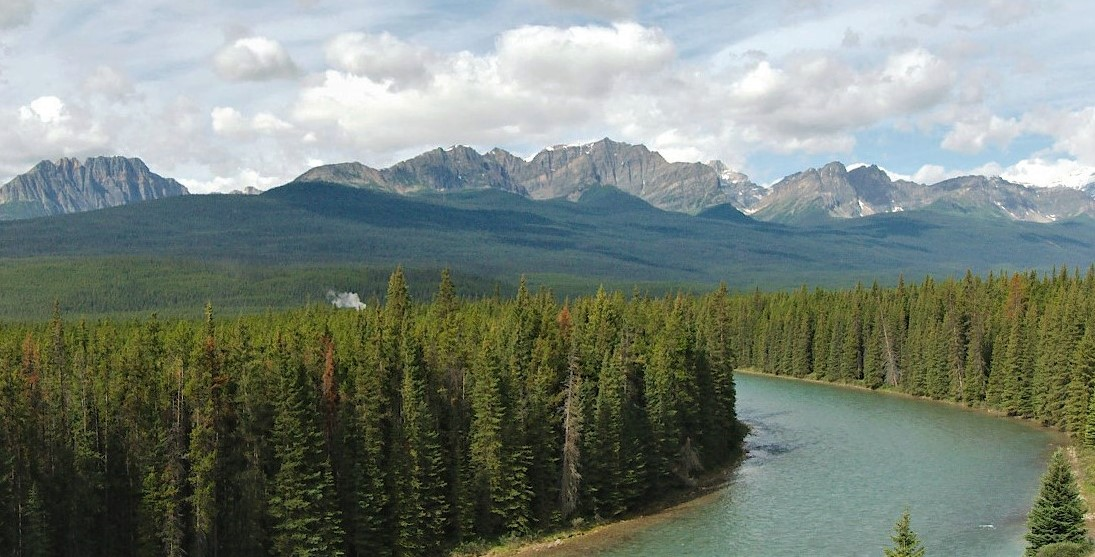
East aspect of Mount Bell centered in the distance.

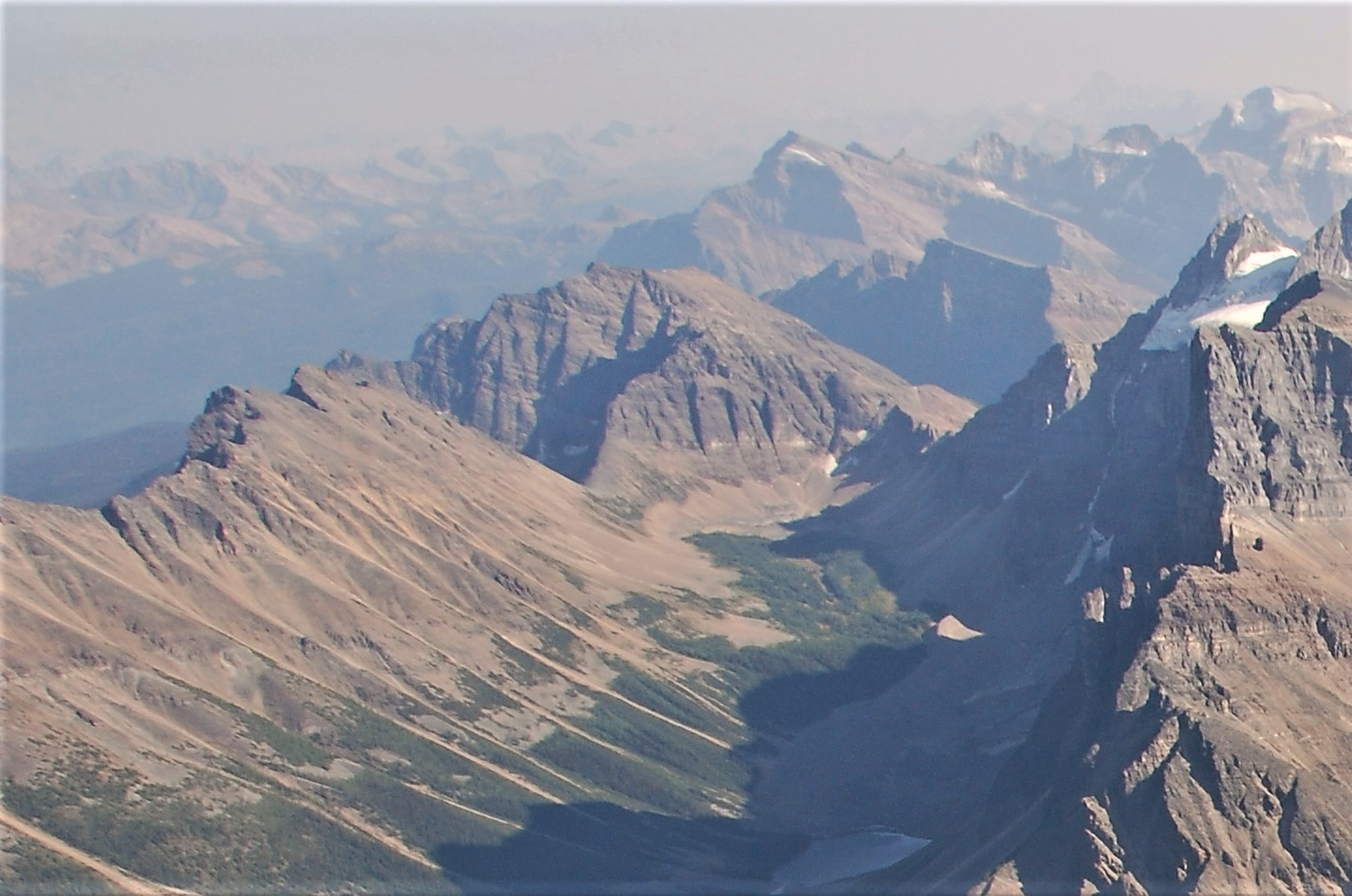
Mount Bell (centered), viewed from Mount Temple

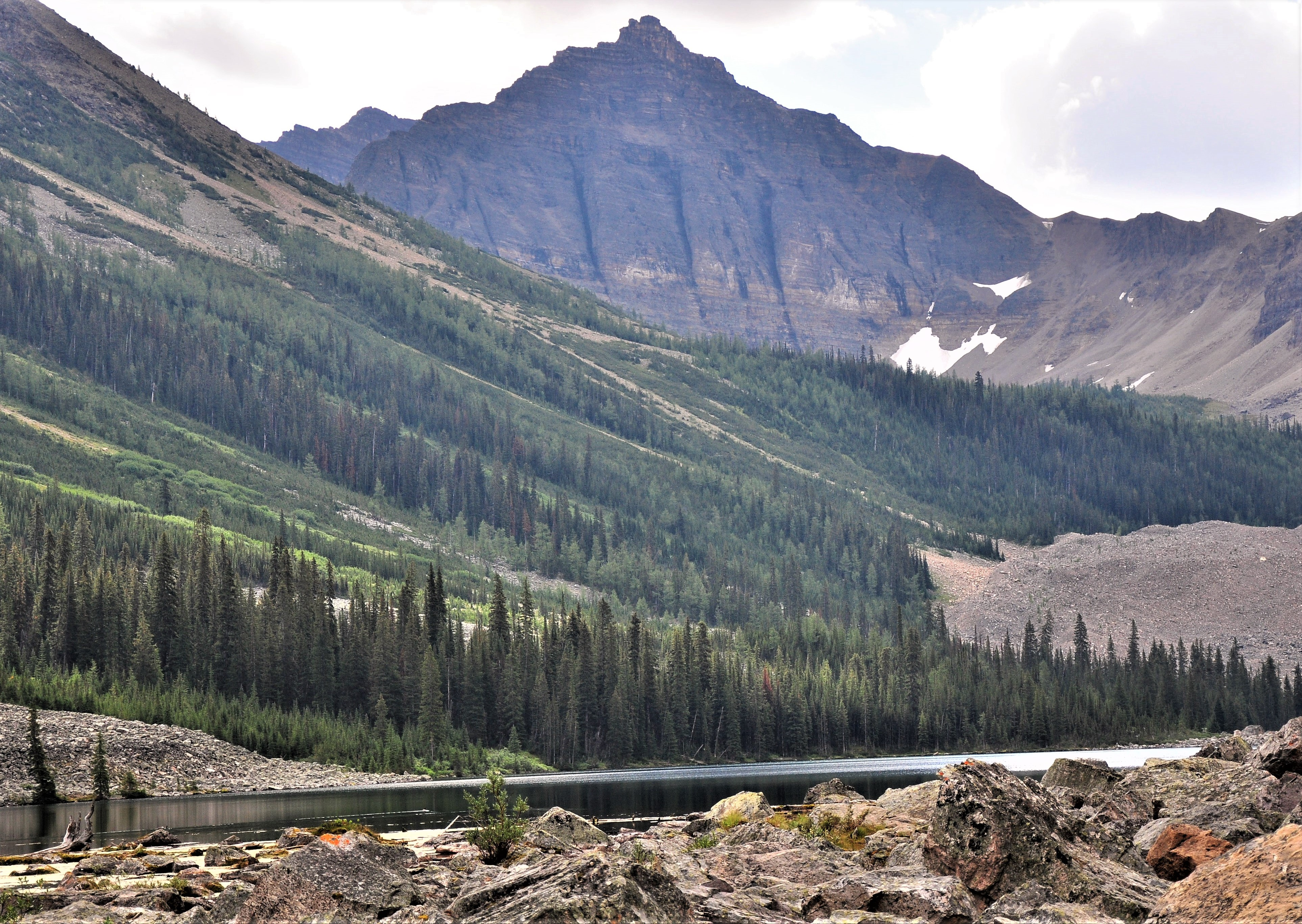
Northwest aspect of Mt. Bell from Consolation Valley
