= Waddington Range =

Subrange of the Coast Mountains in southwestern British Columbia, Canada

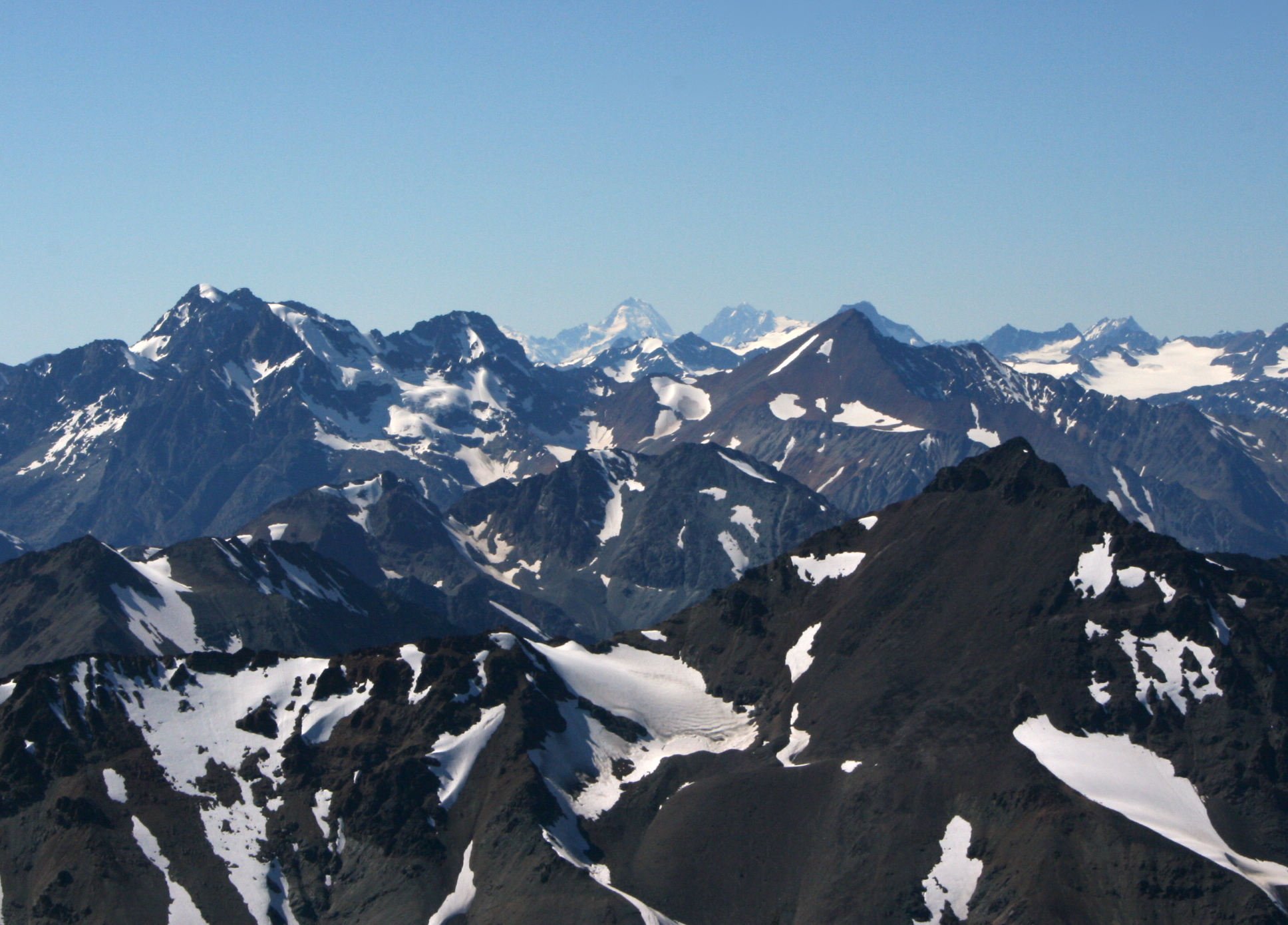

Highest point
- Peak: Mount Waddington
- Elevation: 4,019 m (13,186 ft)
- Coordinates: 51°22′25″N 125°15′48″W

Dimensions
- Area: 4,000 km^{2} (1,500 mi^{2})

Geography
- Location within British Columbia
- Country: Canada
- Province: British Columbia
- Range coordinates: 51°22′59″N 125°20′05″W
- Parent range: Pacific Ranges
- Borders on: Pantheon Range; Whitemantle Range
- Topo map: NTS 92N6 Mount Waddington

The Waddington Range is a subrange of the Pacific Ranges of the Coast Mountains in southwestern British Columbia, Canada. It is only about 4,000 km^{2} (1,500 sq mi) in area, relatively small in area within the expanse of the range, but it is the highest area of the Pacific Ranges and of the Coast Mountains, being crowned by its namesake Mount Waddington 4,019 m (13,186 ft).

The Waddington Range is also extremely rugged and more a complex of peaks than a single icefield, in contrast to the other huge icefield-massifs of the southern Coast Mountains, which are not so peak-studded and tend to have more contiguous icemasses.

== History ==
The difficulty of access to the core of the massif delayed actual sighting, measurement and climbing of Mount Waddington until 1936; it had only been espied from Vancouver Island by climbers in the 1930s and was at first referred to as Mystery Mountain - because its existence until then had been unknown. Apparently even in First Nations lore its existence was spoken of only vaguely, as a possibility, and it seems unlikely the core of the massif was penetrated by any First Nations adventurer given the tremendous difficulty posed even for mountaineers equipped with modern outdoor gear.

At its eastern edge, deep in the Grand Canyon of the Homathko River, occurred the first gruesome event in the guerilla war known to history as the Chilcotin War of 1864. This resulted from the attempt by Alfred Waddington to build a road from Bute Inlet to Barkerville. Port Waddington, a land-survey left over from those days, remains on the map on the south bank of the Homathko where it empties into Bute Inlet.

Waddington's Road was never completed because of the war, but was examined in later years as one of the main possible routings for the mainline of the Canadian Pacific Railway. Choice of the route would see the terminus of the railway at Victoria but despite strong favour from that city and the province the railway chose Burrard Inlet, which as a result became today's Vancouver.

== Neighbouring ranges and icefields ==
Immediately north of the Waddington Range is the Pantheon Range, while to its south is the Whitemantle Range. Northeast across Mosley Creek, the main west fork of the Homathko River, is the Niut Range, while east across the Homathko River is the Homathko Icefield and its attendant ranges. Northwest across the Klinaklini River is the Ha-Iltzuk Icefield, which is the largest of the coastal icecaps of the southern Coast Mountains, larger than the Waddington Range's complex of glaciers and peaks or the Homathko Icefield.

== List of mountains ==
Mountain / Peak	Elevation		Prominence		FA	Coordinates
Mountain / Peak	m	ft	m	ft	FA	Coordinates
Mount Waddington	4,019	13,186	3,289	10,791	1936	51°22′25″N 125°15′48″W
Mount Tiedemann	3,838	12,592	848	2,782	1939	51°23′38″N 125°14′11″W
Combatant Mountain	3,762	12,343	252	827	1933	51°23′30″N 125°14′42″W
Asperity Mountain	3,723	12,215	173	568	1947	51°23′26″N 125°13′19″W
Spearman Peak	3,365	11,040	135	443	1950	51°21′35″N 125°14′29″W
Mount Munday	3,356	11,010	426	1,398	1930	51°19′43″N 125°12′57″W
Mount Bell	3,269	10,725	799	2,621	1936	51°24′52″N 125°25′49″W
Bravo Peak	3,105	10,187	117	384	1950	51°21′56″N 125°13′56″W
Grenelle Mountain	3,047	9,997	237	778	1950	51°19′16″N 125°8′19″W
Remote Mountain	3,038	9,967	708	2,323	1948	51°27′48″N 125°31′12″W
Jubilee Mountain	2,751	9,026	931	3,054	1931	51°16′18″N 125°31′50″W
