= Quadra Mountain =

Mountain in Alberta/British Columbia, Canada

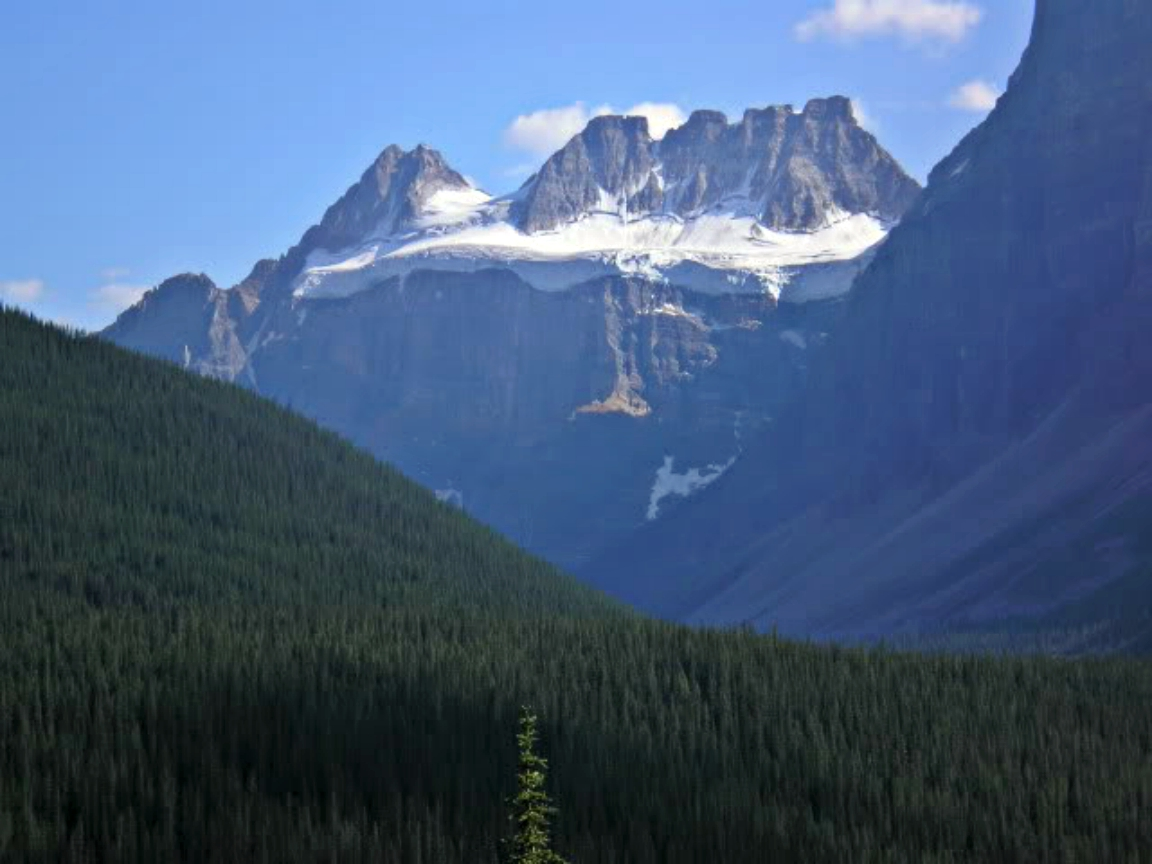
- Quadra Mountain seen from road to Moraine Lake

Highest point
- Elevation: 3,173 m (10,410 ft)
- Prominence: 285 m (935 ft)
- Parent peak: Mount Fay (3234 m)
- Listing: Mountains of Alberta; Mountains of British Columbia
- Coordinates: 51°17′13″N 116°09′12″W

Geography
- Location within Alberta Location within British Columbia Location within Canada
- Country: Canada
- Provinces: Alberta and British Columbia
- Protected areas: Banff National Park; Kootenay National Park
- Parent range: Bow Range
- Topo map: NTS 82N8 Lake Louise

Climbing
- First ascent: 1910 F.C. Bell, A.M. Gordon, Edward Feuz Jr., J.W.A. Hickson
- Easiest route: North Face II

Quadra Mountain is located on the border of Alberta and British Columbia on the Continental Divide. It was named in 1910 by Arthur Oliver Wheeler. The name refers to the mountain's four pinnacles. However, in 1952 the form of the name was changed to Mount Quadra in the mistaken belief that it had been named after Juan Francisco de la Bodega y Quadra—mountains named for people taking the form "Mount Person's Name". In 1983 the form was changed back to Quadra Mountain by British Columbia and Alberta, and in 1984 by Parks Canada.

== Gallery ==
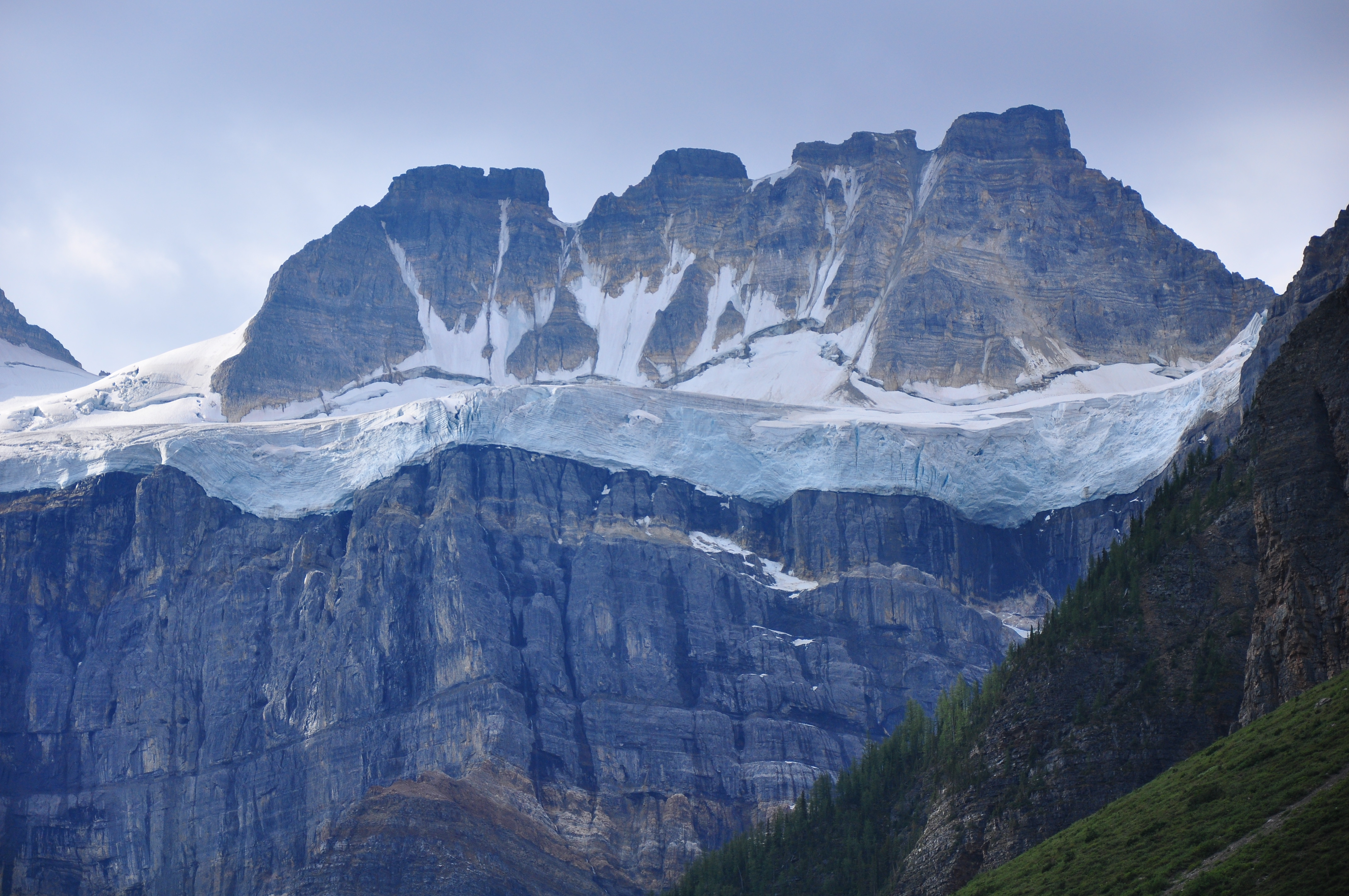
Quadra Mountain from Consolation Lakes Trail

== See also ==
- List of peaks on the Alberta–British Columbia border
- List of mountains in the Canadian Rockies
