= Don Munday =

Walter Alfred Don Munday (1890–1950) was a Canadian explorer, naturalist and mountaineer famous for his explorations of the Coast Mountains with his wife Phyllis, and especially for the exploration of the Waddington Range.

== Early life ==
Don Munday was born and educated in Portage la Prairie, Manitoba and moved to Vancouver, British Columbia with his family in 1909. In World War I, he served in France with the 47th Battalion.

== Marriage ==
Don met Phyllis in 1918. While on a mountaineering trip an incident occurred which, in Don's words, "lends itself readily to being given a romantic aspect." Don lost his footing on a glacial moraine and was in danger of slipping into a crevasse. Phyllis helps him restore his balance, but she loses her balance as well. Don managed to grab her until she could regain her feet.

They married in February 1920, spending their honeymoon in a cabin on Dam Mountain near Vancouver. Their daughter, Edith was born in 1921, and at 11 weeks she was carried to the top of Crown Mountain.

From 1923 to 1926 the Mundays lived in a tent, and then a cabin on Grouse Mountain where Don worked cutting a trail from Lonsdale Avenue in North Vancouver to the summit, while Phyllis ran the Alpine Lodge, serving hot drinks and meals to hikers.

== Discovery of the Waddington Range ==
In 1925, while on a trip to Mount Arrowsmith, Vancouver Island, Don and Phyllis Munday spotted what they believed to be a peak taller than Mount Robson, the then accepted tallest peak entirely within British Columbia. In the words of Don Munday "The compass showed the alluring peak stood along a line passing a little east of Bute Inlet and perhaps 150 miles away, where blank spaces on the map left ample room for many nameless mountains." It was debated whether the peak they saw was indeed Mount Waddington (Don Munday observed that the feat is impossible). They likely saw a peak in the Waddington Range, this led to them exploring the area and discover the Mount Waddington.

Over the next decade, the Mundays mounted several expeditions into the area in an attempt to climb the mountain. Known to them as "The Mystery Mountain", in 1927 the height was measured at 13,260 feet (by triangulation), and the Canadian Geographic Board gave it the name Mount Waddington after Alfred Waddington who was a proponent of a railway through the Homathko River valley. They reached the lower northwest summit in 1928, deeming the main summit too risky.

== First ascents ==
- 1912 Mount Habrich
- 1913 Mount Hanover
- 1922 Parapet Peak
- 1922 Isosceles Peak
- 1923 Blackcomb Peak
- 1923 Overlord Mountain
- 1924 Foley Peak
- 1930 Mount Munday
- 1931 Jubilee Mountain
- 1931 Sockeye Peak
- 1933 Combatant Mountain
- 1936 Silverthrone Mountain
- 1937 Mount Sir Richard
- 1942 Mount Queen Bess
- 1946 Reliance Mountain

Munday died of pneumonia in 1950.
