= Mount Fay =

Mountain in Banff NP, Alberta, Canada

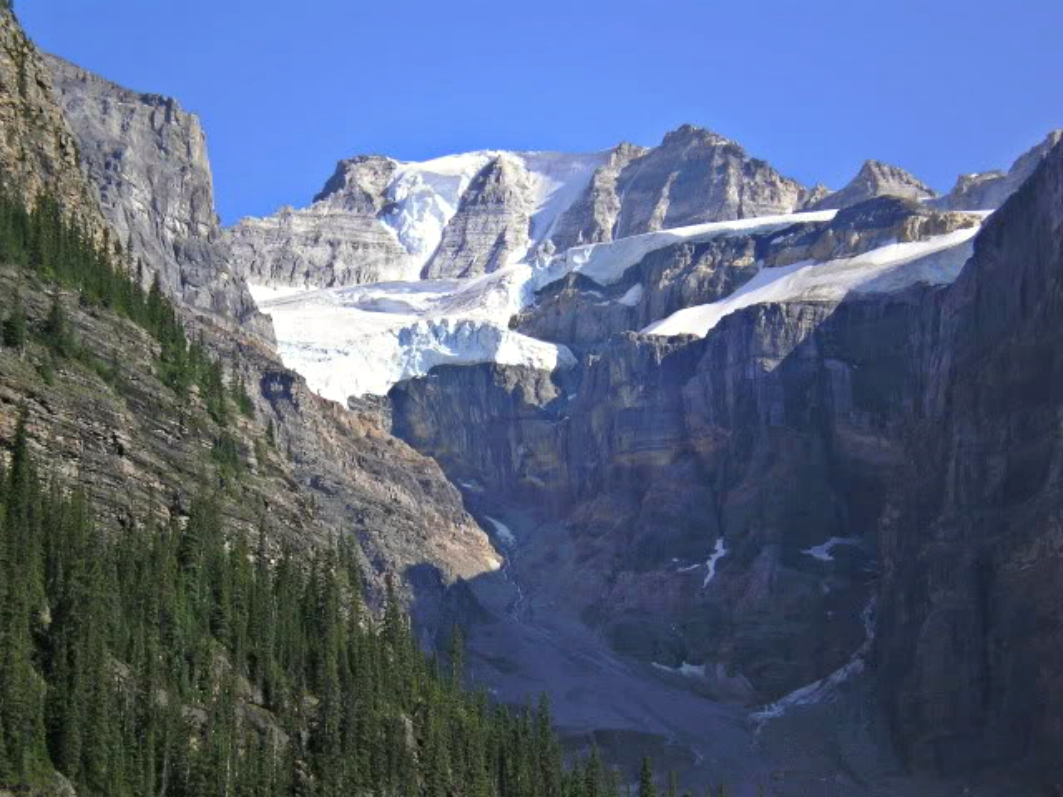
- Mount Fay seen from Moraine Lake

Highest point
- Elevation: 3,235 m (10,614 ft)
- Prominence: 389 m (1,276 ft)
- Parent peak: Mount Allen 3280 m
- Listing: Mountains of Alberta; Mountains of British Columbia
- Coordinates: 51°17′58″N 116°09′43″W

Geography
- Location within Alberta Location within British Columbia Location within Canada
- Interactive map of Mount Fay
- Country: Canada
- Provinces: Alberta and British Columbia
- Protected area: Banff National Park
- Parent range: Bow Range
- Topo map: NTS 82N8 Lake Louise

Climbing
- First ascent: 1904 Gertrude Benham, Christian Kaufmann
- Easiest route: South-West Face

Mount Fay is a mountain located on the Continental Divide in the Canadian Rockies. The mountain forms part of the backdrop to Moraine Lake in the Valley of the Ten Peaks of Banff National Park. It was named in 1902 for Charles E. Fay, an early explorer of the Canadian Rockies. He was a member of the party who attempted Mount Lefroy in 1896 when the first mountaineer to be killed in the Canadian Rockies occurred.

== Notable ascents ==
- 1904 First ascent by Gertrude Benham ahead of the mountain's namesake alpinist Charles E. Fay.
- 1937 December 22 First winter ascent by E.R. Gibson, Doug Crosby, and Bob Hind
- 1984 East Face (V/VI 5.8 WI5) FA by Barry Blanchard, David Cheesmond and Carl Tobin. Repetition of the East Face and variation on the finish was done from 2–3 April 2019 by Brette Harrington, Luka Lindič and Ines Papert.

== Geology ==
Like other mountains in Banff Park, Mount Fay is composed of sedimentary rock laid down during the Precambrian to Jurassic periods. Formed in shallow seas, this sedimentary rock was pushed east and over the top of younger rock during the Laramide orogeny.

== Climate ==
Based on the Köppen climate classification, Mount Fay is located in a subarctic climate zone with cold, snowy winters, and mild summers. Winter temperatures can drop below −20 °C with wind chill factors below −30 °C.

== Gallery ==
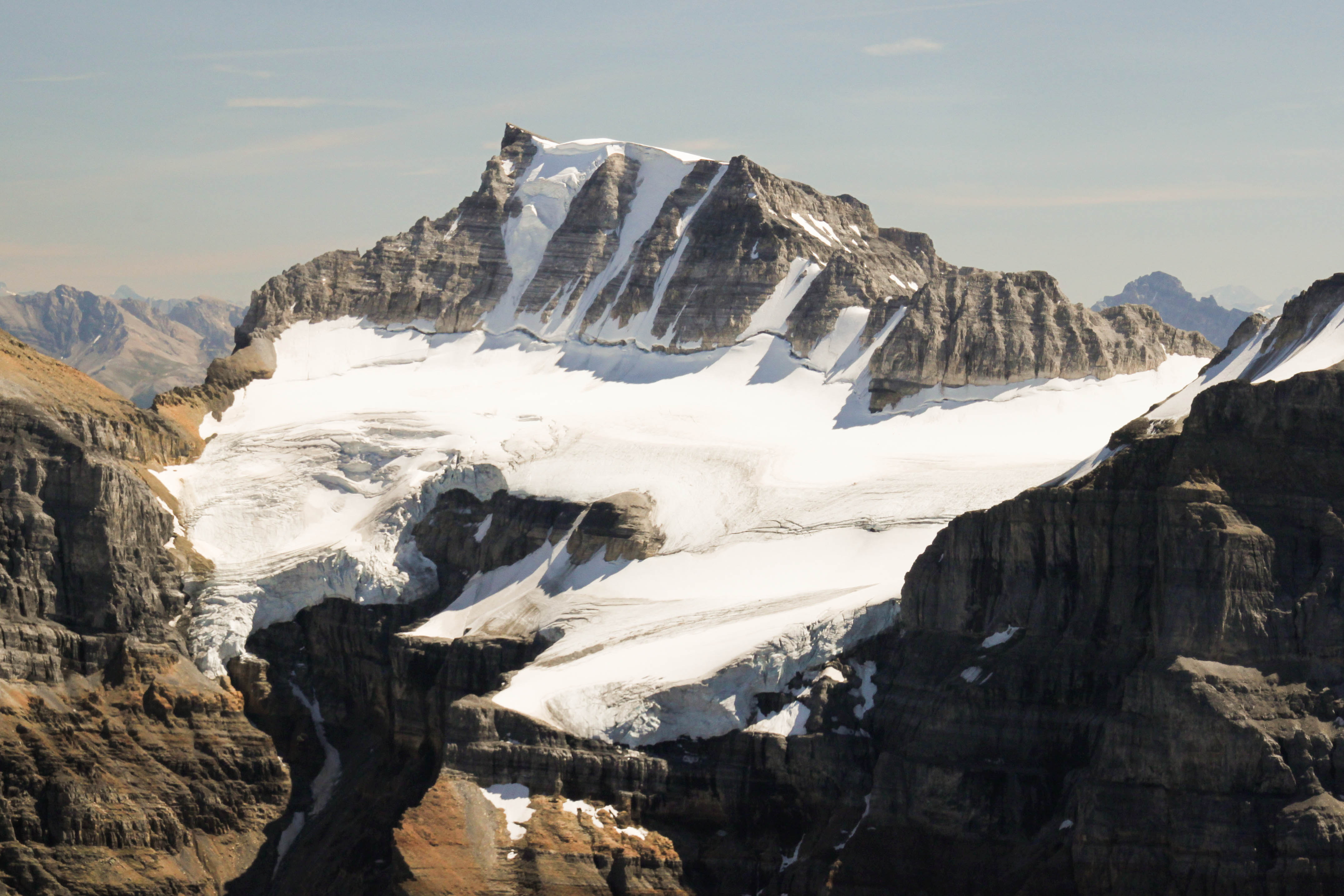
Mount Fay and Fay Glacier

== See also ==
- List of mountains in the Canadian Rockies
- List of peaks on the Alberta–British Columbia border
