= Mount Morfee =

Mountain in British Columbia

- Morfee Mountain
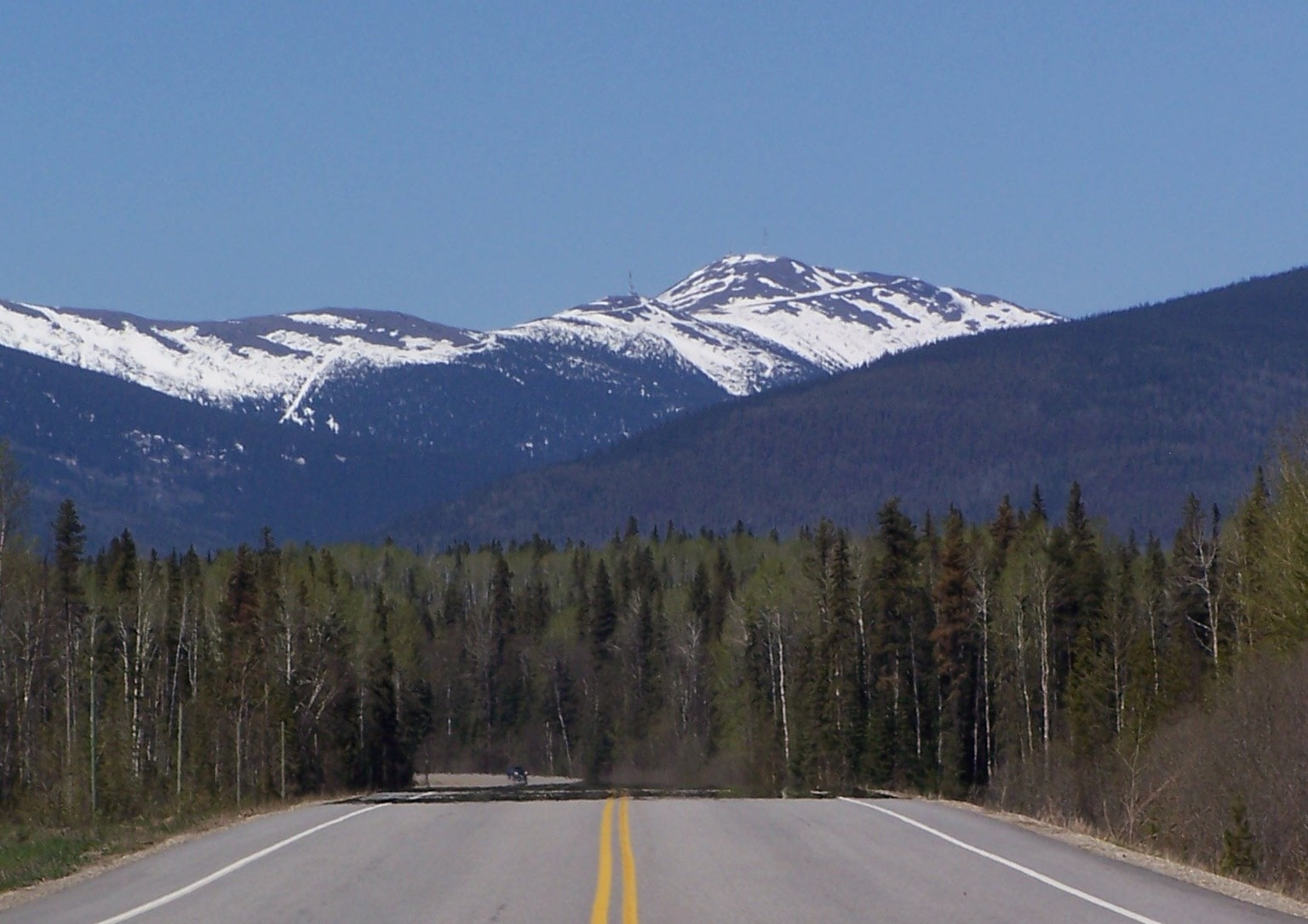
- Mount Morfee from Highway 39

Highest point
- Elevation: 1,775 m (5,823 ft)
- Prominence: 521 m (1,709 ft)
- Parent peak: Mount Murray
- Coordinates: 55°25′50″N 123°02′3″W

Geography
- Location within British Columbia Location within Canada
- Interactive map of Mount Morfee
- Location: British Columbia, Canada
- District: Cariboo Land District
- Parent range: Misinchinka Ranges
- Topo map: NTS 93O6 Morfee Lakes

Mount Morfee, is a 1,775 metre (5,823 feet) peak in the Misinchinka Ranges, a subdivision range of the Hart Ranges, within the Northern Rocky Mountains. The mountain is known locally as Morfee Mountain and features prominently over the town Mackenzie, BC.

It was named for Flight Lieutenant Alan Morfee of the Royal Canadian Air Force, who flew the earliest air photography of the region in the early 1930s. The nearby Morfee Lake and Morfee Creek are also named after Flight Lieutenant Morfee, as well as an island near Tofino, BC.

Given its easy accessibility via Highway 39, the mountain is a popular snowmobile destination in the winter. A gravel road to the summit also provides easily accessible biking and hiking opportunities during the summer season.

The Morfee Mountain Downhill mountain bike trail system opened in July 2023. Shuttle access from Morfee Mountain Road provides approximately 14 km of trail with approximately 850 m of decent on the main ridge-line epic trail. This trail starts with a 6 km ride through the alpine with views of the Miscinchinka Ranges before starting the main descent.
