= Mount Abbl =

Mountain in British Columbia, Canada

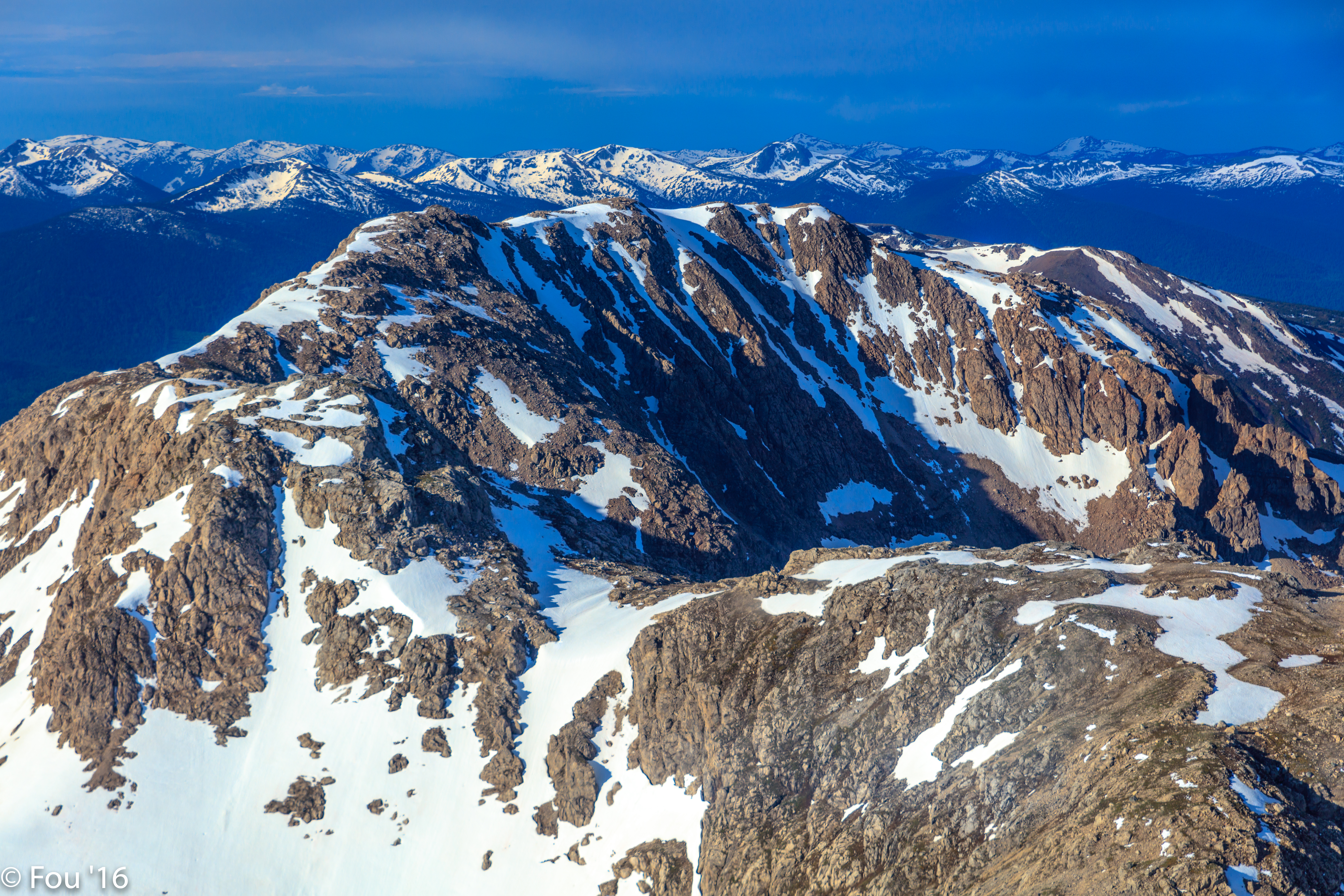
- Looking S across Mount Abbl toward Monkman Park

Highest point
- Elevation: 2,012 m (6,601 ft)
- Prominence: 654 m (2,146 ft)
- Parent peak: Scatia Peak (2383 m)
- Listing: Mountains of British Columbia
- Coordinates: 54°41′02″N 121°42′33″W

Geography
- Location within British Columbia Location within Canada
- Interactive map of Mount Abbl
- Country: Canada
- Province: British Columbia
- District: Cariboo Land District
- Parent range: Misinchinka Ranges
- Topo map: NTS 93I12 Missinka River

Mount Abbl is a 2,012-metre (6,601 ft) mountain in the Miscinchinka Ranges of the Hart Ranges in the Northern Rocky Mountains.

Named for Canadian Army Private Ernest E. Abbl, from Prince George, BC. Private Abbl served with the 2nd Canadian Division, 5th Infantry Brigade, Calgary Highlanders and was killed in action 8 February 1945, age 19 in the opening days of Operation Veritable. He is buried at Groesbeek Canadian War Cemetery, Netherlands, grave V.A.14.
