= Mount Aitken =

Mountain in British Columbia, Canada

- Location within British Columbia Location within Canada
- Interactive map of Mount Aitken

Highest point
- Elevation: 1,854 m (6,083 ft)
- Prominence: 673 m (2,208 ft)
- Coordinates: 55°01′06″N 122°22′33″W

Geography
- Location: British Columbia, Canada
- District: Cariboo Land District
- Parent range: Misinchinka Ranges
- Topo map: NTS 93O1 Mount Reynolds

Mount Aitken, is a 1,854-metre (6,083 ft) mountain in the Miscinchinka Ranges of the Hart Ranges in the Northern Rocky Mountains.

Named to remember Canadian Army Lieut. John Alexander Aitken, of Prince George, BC, killed in action 27 August 1944, age 27. Aitken enlisted the day Canada declared war in September 1939; transferred to Prince Rupert, BC and trained as an Artillery Officer. He volunteered to be transferred to the British Army in May 1944 and was killed his first day in action, while crossing the Seine River. (November 1993 letter from his widow, Josephine, file M.2.57).

The Commonwealth War Graves Commission indicates that Lieut. Aitken was serving with the 227th Infantry Brigade, 2nd Btn Gordon Highlanders, RCIC, when he was killed. He is buried at Bretteville-Sur-Laize Canadian War Cemetery, Calvados, France, Grave XXVIII. F. 4.
