= Mount Vreeland =

Mountain in British Columbia, Canada

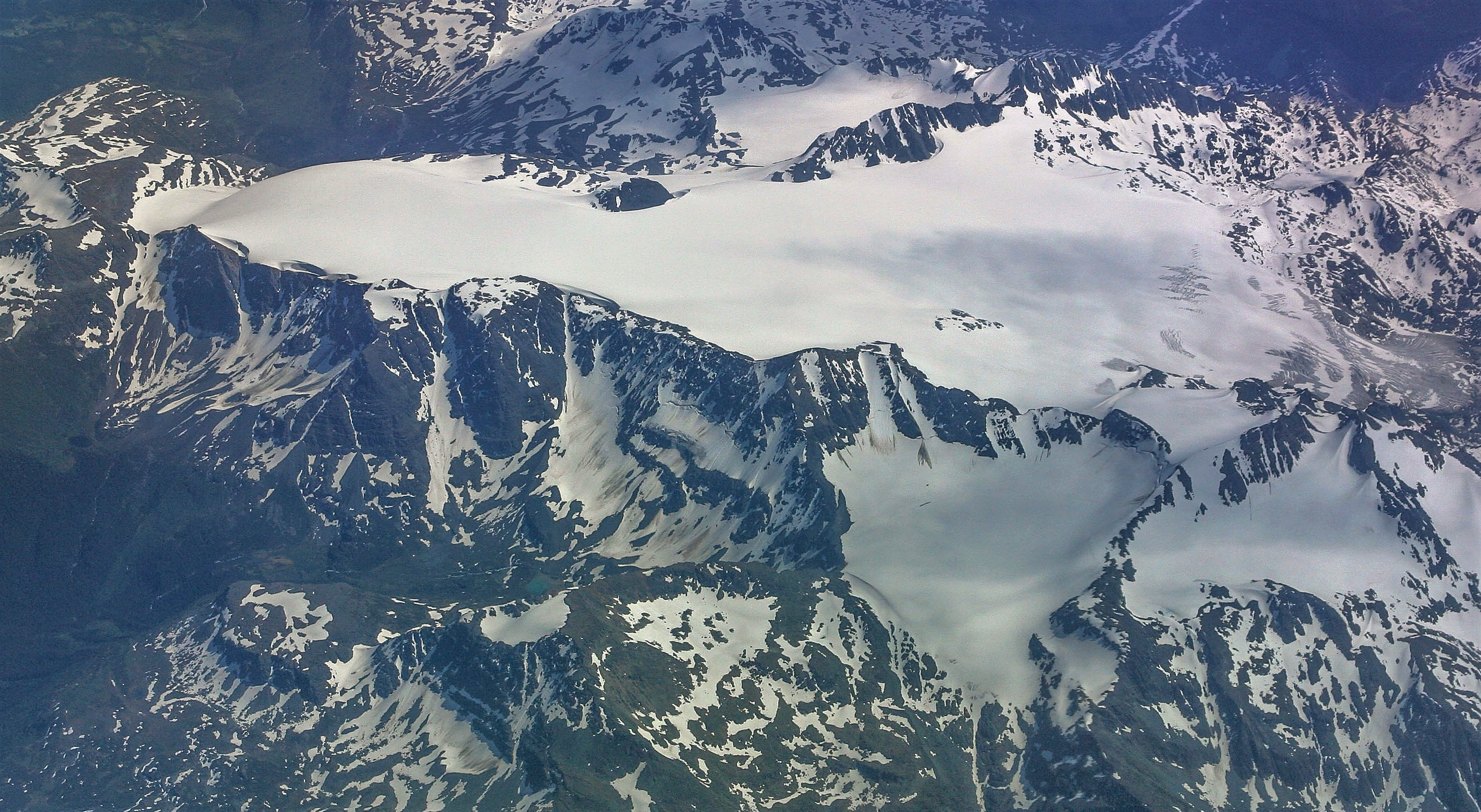
- Aerial view from the northwest

Highest point
- Elevation: 2,464 m (8,084 ft)
- Prominence: 1,275 m (4,183 ft)
- Coordinates: 54°34′09″N 121°25′57″W

Geography
- Location within British Columbia Location within Canada
- Location: British Columbia, Canada
- District: Cariboo Land District
- Parent range: Misinchinka Ranges
- Topo map: NTS 93I11 Monkman Pass

Mount Vreeland, is a 2,464-metre (8,084 ft) mountain in the Miscinchinka Ranges of the Hart Ranges in the Northern Rocky Mountains.

It was named in 1915 by George V. Copley, surveyor, after Frederick K. Vreeland of New York, who spent three years doing exploration work in the vicinity of the McGregor River and the headwaters of the Parsnip River, 1912, 1913 and 1915. The name does not appear to be related to the Dutch Village of Vreeland.

Mount Vreeland is the highest summit of the Monkman Icefield. Vreeland is on a ridge between the Vreeland Glacier to the northwest and the Parsnip Glacier to the south (the source of the Parsnip River).
