= Mount Whitford =

Mountain in British Columbia, Canada

- Location within British Columbia Location within Canada
- Interactive map of Mount Whitford

Highest point
- Elevation: 1,987 m (6,519 ft)
- Prominence: 583 m (1,913 ft)
- Listing: Mountains of British Columbia
- Coordinates: 54°52′04″N 121°52′19″W

Geography
- Location: British Columbia, Canada
- District: Cariboo Land District
- Parent range: Misinchinka Ranges
- Topo map: NTS 93I13 Sentinel Peak

Mount Whitford is a 1,986-metre (6,516 ft) mountain in the Misinchinka Ranges of the Hart Ranges in the Northern Rocky Mountains.

It was named to remember Canadian Army Private Roy Whitford, K50054, enlisted at Prince George, BC, serving with the Royal Canadian Infantry Corps when he was killed 28 April 1943, age 21. The Royal Canadian Infantry Corps was established in 1942 as an administrative corps to oversee the needs of the infantry regiments, as well as provide a holding organization for trained recruits that had not yet been assigned to a unit as well as staff for training centres in Canada. Location of death currently unknown. With no known grave, his name is inscribed on the Halifax Memorial, panel 16.
