= Alexis Peak =

Mountain in British Columbia, Canada

- Location within British Columbia Location within Canada

Highest point
- Elevation: 2,123 m (6,965 ft)
- Prominence: 593 m (1,946 ft)
- Parent peak: Mount Dudzic
- Listing: Mountains of British Columbia
- Coordinates: 55°02′56″N 121°01′47″W

Geography
- Location: British Columbia, Canada
- District: Cariboo Land District
- Parent range: Misinchinka Ranges
- Topo map: NTS 93O1 Mount Reynolds

Alexis Peak, is a 2,123-metre (6,965 ft) mountain in the Misinchinka Ranges of the Hart Ranges in Northern British Columbia.

Named after Canadian Army Lance Corporal Alexander Alexis, from Prince George, BC. Lance Corporal Alexis was killed in action 18 August 1944, during Operation Tractable, that took place in the final days of the Battle of Falaise Pocket. He was a member of the 3rd Canadian Division, Royal Winnipeg Rifles and is buried in the Beny-Sur-Mer Canadian War Cemetery.
