= Mount Myhon =

Mountain in British Columbia

- Location within British Columbia Location within Canada

Highest point
- Elevation: 2,119 m (6,952 ft)
- Prominence: 659 m (2,162 ft)
- Coordinates: 54°47′06″N 121°31′26″W

Geography
- Location: British Columbia, Canada
- District: Cariboo Land District
- Parent range: Misinchinka Ranges
- Topo map: NTS 93I13 Sentinel Peak

Mount Myhon, is a 2,119-metre (6,952 ft) mountain in the Miscinchinka Ranges of the Hart Ranges in the Northern Rocky Mountains.

The mountain is named after Canadian Army Private James Stanley Myhon, K2333, enlisted at Prince George; serving with the 3rd Canadian Division, 7th Infantry Brigade, Canadian Scottish Regiment. Private Myhon was killed in action 28 October 1944, age 19 during Operation Switchback, a component of the Battle of the Scheldt. He is buried at Adegem Canadian War Cemetery, Belgium, grave VII.B.7.
