= Mount Bracey =

Mountain in British Columbia, Canada

- Location within British Columbia Location within Canada
- Interactive map of Mount Bracey

Highest point
- Elevation: 1,954 m (6,411 ft)
- Prominence: 597 m (1,959 ft)
- Coordinates: 54°54′18″N 122°06′19″W

Geography
- Location: British Columbia, Canada
- District: Cariboo Land District
- Parent range: Misinchinka Ranges
- Topo map: NTS 93J16 Anzac River

Mount Bracey, is a 1,954-metre (6,411 ft) mountain in the Miscinchinka Ranges of the Hart Ranges in the Northern Rocky Mountains.

Named after Canadian Army Corporal Charles William Bracey, from South Fort George, BC; serving with 4th Armoured Brigade, 4th Canadian (Armoured) Division, Lake Superior Regiment (Motor), R.C.I.C. when he was killed in action 15 August 1944, age 23 during Operation Tractable, in Normandy.. Cpl Bracey is buried at Hottot-les-Bagues War Cemetery, Calvados, France, grave III. A. 5.
