= Honeymoon Creek =

Location
- Country: Canada
- Province: British Columbia
- Regional District: Fraser Fort-George
- Land District: Cariboo

Physical characteristics
- Source
  - location: Lavitah Mountain
  - coordinates: 55°15′37″N 122°46′22″W
- Mouth
  - location: Misinchinka River
  - coordinates: 55°13′11″N 122°42′47″W
- Length: 6.4 km (4.0 mi)

Basin features
- River system: Parsnip River Watershed

Honeymoon Creek is a small river in the Hart Ranges of the Northern Rockies of British Columbia.

Sourced from the north face of Lavitah Mountain, the creek passes on the northside of the Honeymoon Creek Highway Maintenance Yard and under Highway 97 (John Hart Highway).
