= Lavitah Mountain =

Mountain in British Columbia, Canada

- Location within British Columbia Location within Canada
- Interactive map of Lavitah Mountain

Highest point
- Elevation: 1,699 m (5,574 ft)
- Prominence: 545 m (1,788 ft)
- Coordinates: 55°13′33″N 122°46′47″W

Geography
- Location: British Columbia, Canada
- District: Cariboo Land District
- Parent range: Misinchinka Ranges
- Topo map: NTS 93O2 Colbourne Creek

Lavitah Mountain is a 1,699-metre (5,574 ft) mountain in the Miscinchinka Ranges of the Hart Ranges in the Northern Rocky Mountains.

The naming is generally unknown, although records indicate that it was established by a government forest Ranger based at Summit Lake, BC in 1957.

Several recreational projects have been proposed for the mountain, none of which have moved forward past very preliminary studies. A private, members only ski area was first proposed in the mid-2000s followed by the Pine Pass Mountain Top Community, a four-season resort studied in 2012. The 2018 District of Mackenzie Recreation Trails Master Plan identified the mountain as a potential backcountry ski area.

In 2012 the mountain was also studied as a potential location for a wind farm project, although further development has yet to occur.

In 2022 the Prince George Backcountry Ski Society submitted an application to develop a ski touring cabin near the mountain. The 6-8 person A-frame cabin is proposed on the northside of the mountain in the Honeymoon Creek watershed. The cabin trailhead would begin at Highway 97, near the Honeymoon Creek highway maintenance yard and be approximately 5.6 km in length.

== Hydrology ==
Lavitah Mountain is the source for two small creeks. Caswell Creek on the south face and an unnamed tributary of Honeymoon Creek on the north face
