= Old Friend Mountain =

Mountain in British Columbia

- Location within British Columbia Location within Canada
- Interactive map of Old Friend Mountain

Highest point
- Elevation: 1,844 m (6,050 ft)
- Prominence: 588 m (1,929 ft)
- Coordinates: 55°15′02″N 122°36′54″W

Geography
- Location: British Columbia, Canada
- District: Cariboo Land District
- Parent range: Misinchinka Ranges
- Topo map: NTS 93O7 Azouzetta Lake

Old Friend Mountain, is a 1,844-metre (6,050 ft) mountain in the Miscinchinka Ranges of the Hart Ranges in the Northern Rocky Mountains.

The mountain is a prominent feature along Highway 97 John Hart Highway, north of the Highway 39 junction.
