= Mount Stephenson (British Columbia) =

Mountain in British Columbia, Canada

- Location within British Columbia Location within Canada

Highest point
- Elevation: 2,037 m (6,683 ft)
- Prominence: 855 m (2,805 ft)
- Parent peak: Grant Peak (2094 m)
- Listing: Mountains of British Columbia
- Coordinates: 55°24′53″N 122°17′55″W

Geography
- Country: Canada
- Province: British Columbia
- District: Peace River Land District
- Parent range: Solitude Range
- Topo map: NTS 93O8 Le Moray Creek

Mount Stephenson, is a 2,037-metre (6,683 ft) mountain in the Solitude Range, a subrange of the Misinchinka Ranges of the Hart Ranges in northern British Columbia, Canada. It is named for Canadian Army Corporal Harry Stephenson, from Kilkerran (north of Dawson Creek, BC). Corporal Stephenson served with the 10 Field Squadron, Canadian Engineers with the 5th Canadian Armoured Division and was killed in action on 11 September 1944, along the Italian Gothic Line, age 31. He is buried in the Gradara War Cemetery, Italy.
