= Mount Dudzic =

Mountain in British Columbia, Canada

- Location within British Columbia
- Interactive map of Mount Dudzic

Highest point
- Elevation: 2,169 m (7,116 ft)
- Prominence: 746 m (2,448 ft)
- Coordinates: 54°56′22″N 121°52′03″W

Geography
- Location: British Columbia, Canada
- District: Cariboo Land District
- Parent range: Misinchinka Ranges
- Topo map: NTS 93I13 Sentinel Peak

Mount Dudzic, is a 2,169-metre (7,116 ft) mountain in the Misinchinka Ranges of the Hart Ranges in the Northern Rocky Mountains.

Named for Canadian Army Private Albert Dudzic, K50052, enlisted at Prince George, BC. Private Dudzic served with the Royal Canadian Army Service Corps when he was killed 28 April 1943, age 20. With no known grave, his name is inscribed on the Halifax Memorial, panel 16. The name was officially adopted in 1963.
