= Milburn Peak =

Mountain in British Columbia, Canada

- Location within British Columbia Location within Canada

Highest point
- Elevation: 2,019 m (6,624 ft)
- Prominence: 503 m (1,650 ft)
- Parent peak: Mount Hunter
- Listing: Mountains of British Columbia
- Coordinates: 55°15′29″N 122°21′02″W

Geography
- Location: Pine Pass; British Columbia, Canada
- District: Cariboo Land District
- Parent range: Murray Range
- Topo map: NTS 93O8 Le Moray Creek

Milburn Peak, is a 2,019-metre (6,624 ft) mountain in the Murray Range of the Hart Ranges in Northern British Columbia.

Named after Royal Canadian Air Force Flying Officer Philip Giles Milburn, from Prince George, BC. Flying Officer Milburn served as a Lancaster pilot with No. 550 (RAF) Squadron and was killed in action 23 April 1944, age 23.
