= Bijoux Creek =

Location
- Country: Canada
- Province: British Columbia
- Land District: Cariboo Land District
- Regional District: Fraser Fort-George

Physical characteristics
- Source
  - coordinates: 55°20′28″N 122°43′14″W
- Mouth
  - location: Misinchinka River
  - coordinates: 55°18′21″N 122°40′6″W
- Length: 5.8 km (3.6 mi)

Basin features
- River system: Parsnip River Watershed

Bijoux Creek is a small river in the Hart Ranges of the Northern Rockies of British Columbia.

Named in 1954 by Frank Clapp, Department of Highways for the sparkling jewel like water. The creek is well known for the 40m high Bijoux Falls.

On November 28, 2020 a snowmobiler was killed in an avalanche which occurred near the source of Bijoux Creek.
