= Mount Selwyn (Misinchinka Ranges) =

Mountain in British Columbia, Canada

- Location within British Columbia Location within Canada

Highest point
- Elevation: 2,291 m (7,516 ft)
- Prominence: 950 m (3,120 ft)
- Parent peak: Mount Crysdale
- Coordinates: 55°59′30″N 123°36′24″W

Geography
- Location: British Columbia, Canada
- District: Cariboo Land District
- Parent range: Misinchinka Ranges
- Topo map: NTS 93O13 Mount Selwyn

Mount Selwyn, is a 2,291-metre (7,516-feet) mountain in the Miscinchinka Ranges of the Hart Ranges in Northern British Columbia.

Mount Selwyn is named for A.R.C. Selwyn, Director of the Geological Survey of Canada 1869-95. In 1875 he took an expedition up the Peace River to see if a mountain there could be as incredibly precipitous a cone as an English illustrator of W.F. Butler's The Wild North Land had made it. He found that the mountain was indeed an impressive one but not at all like the artist had shown it. At the suggestion of Professor John Macoun, the expedition's botanist, the mountain was named for Selwyn.
