= Mount Kinney =

Mountain in British Columbia, Canada

- Location within British Columbia Location within Canada
- Interactive map of Mount Kinney

Highest point
- Elevation: 1,996 m (6,549 ft)
- Prominence: 659 m (2,162 ft)
- Coordinates: 55°05′58″N 122°10′26″W

Geography
- Location: British Columbia, Canada
- District: Cariboo Land District
- Parent range: Misinchinka Ranges
- Topo map: NTS 93O3 Tudyah Lake

Mount Kinney, is a 1,996-metre (6,549 ft) mountain in the Miscinchinka Ranges of the Hart Ranges in the Northern Rocky Mountains. It is named after Canadian Army Gunner Albert Lloyd Kinney, from Prince George, BC; serving with 2nd Canadian Division, 3 Light A.A. Regiment, Royal Canadian Artillery when he was killed in action 8 August 1944, age 26, during Operation Totalize. He is buried at Bretteville-Sur-Laize Canadian War Cemetery, grave VI, F, 11.
