= Mount Gilliland =

Mountain in British Columbia

- Location within British Columbia Location within Canada
- Interactive map of Mount Gilliland

Highest point
- Elevation: 1,940 m (6,360 ft)
- Prominence: 516 m (1,693 ft)
- Parent peak: Howling Wolves Peak
- Coordinates: 55°21′20″N 122°11′55″W

Geography
- Location: British Columbia, Canada
- District: Peace River Land District
- Parent range: Solitude Range
- Topo map: NTS 93O8 Le Moray Creek

Mount Gilliland, is a 1,940-metre (6,365 ft) mountain in the Solitude Range, a subrange of the Misinchinka Ranges of the Hart Ranges in northern British Columbia, Canada.

Named for Canadian Army Battery Quartermaster Sergeant Norman Walter Gilliland, originally from Bowden, Alberta but enlisted at Dawson Creek, British Columbia; serving with 3 Light Anti-Aircraft Regiment, Royal Regiment of Canadian Artillery, attached to the 2nd Canadian Infantry Division when he died 29 September 1944, age 44. He is buried in Wijnegem Communal Cemetery, Belgium.
