= Caswell Creek =

River in British Columbia

Location
- Country: Canada
- Province: British Columbia
- Regional District: Fraser Fort-George

Physical characteristics
- Source
  - location: Lavitah Mountain
  - coordinates: 55°11′28″N 122°44′53″W
- Mouth
  - location: Misinchinka River
  - coordinates: 55°13′27″N 122°46′30″W
- Length: 4.9 km (3.0 mi)

Basin features
- River system: Parsnip River Watershed

Caswell Creek is a small river in the Hart Ranges of the Northern Rockies of British Columbia.

The creek is named after Mr. Caswell, superintendent of the W.C. Arnett Construction Company, which constructed part of the John Hart Highway in 1954 (Hwy 97).
