= Mount Merrick (British Columbia) =

Mountain in British Columbia, Canada

- Location within British Columbia Location within Canada
- Interactive map of Mount Merrick

Highest point
- Elevation: 1,749 m (5,738 ft)
- Prominence: 294 m (965 ft)
- Parent peak: Mount Jilg (1750 m)
- Listing: Mountains of British Columbia
- Coordinates: 55°10′58″N 121°55′38″W

Geography
- Country: Canada
- Province: British Columbia
- District: Peace River Land District
- Parent range: Solitude Range
- Topo map: NTS 93P4 Sukunka River

Mount Merrick, is a 1,749-metre (5,738 ft) mountain on the northern side of upper Sukunka River in the Solitude Range, a subrange of the Misinchinka Ranges of the Hart Ranges in northern British Columbia, Canada.

The mountain is named for Canadian Army Corporal Keith Warren Merrick from Pouce Coupe. Corporal Stephenson served with the 10 Field Squadron, Canadian Engineers of the 5th Canadian Division and was killed in action on 25 May 1944. He is buried in the Cassino War Cemetery, Italy.
