= Alexander Monkman =

Alexander Monkman (March 29, 1870 – September 26, 1941) was a Canadian Métis pioneer trader and leader of the farmers in the Lake Saskatoon area of Alberta. He discovered Monkman Pass and led the push to build a highway through it in the 1930s.

== Early life ==
Alexander Monkman was born at Manitoba House on March 29, 1870, and grew up around Fort Garry, however he and his family fled to Edmonton after the suppression of the Red River Rebellion and received his education from mission schools. Monkman travelled to Montana and became a rodeo-rider. He returned to Edmonton from whence he set off to travel overland to join the Klondike Gold Rush in 1898. After a while, Monkman realised that his convoy would not make it and he turned back. He was the only one to turn back and he never heard from his colleagues again.

== Career ==
Monkman was hired by William Bredin and James Cornwall to become the trading post manager at the new Grande Prairie site near Lake Saskatoon. He lived there with his wife Louisa. He was the first non-Hudson's Bay Company trader in the region, and succeeded in cutting off the Hudson's Bay Company from the region's furs. This was the spot where Danezaa and Cree Indians met to form their summer camps, and a village soon sprang up around the trading post with mission churches, a bank and a post office. (The settlement at Lake Saskatoon was abandoned in 1924 and the buildings moved to Wembley.)

By the early 1900s Monkman held property of his own near Flying Shot Lake and received various grants from the government, which was trying to stimulate agricultural production in the area by handing out seeds to settlers for free.

In 1922, while looking for tungsten in the Rocky Mountains, Monkman discovered a pass through the Rockies, which was later named in his honour. Grain farmers in his region were trying to find a way to cheaply transport their harvest to the seaport at Vancouver. Grain was being transported by rail through Peace River, Edmonton and Calgary, a 1700-mile trip. Monkman's route cut 1000 miles off the total distance travelled, and engineers reported that Monkman's pass was easier to traverse than even the Yellowhead Pass at Jasper. However the Yellowhead Pass was selected for the northern-most major transport line through the mountains.

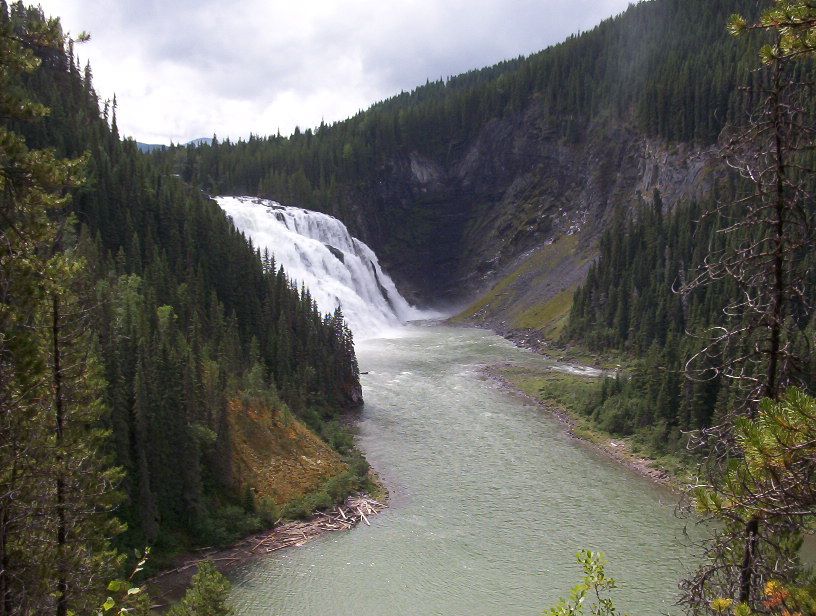
Monkman Provincial Park, named after Alexander Monkman, is home to Kinuseo Falls shown here

By 1936, high freight costs had taken a toll on the area farmers, and Monkman suggested that the farmers build a highway through the Monkman Pass themselves to reduce freight costs. A fundraising effort took hold; signs for the 'M.P.H.' (Monkman Pass Highway) bestrewn the region and construction began using volunteer labour, starting from Rio Grande. By 1937 the volunteers had pushed a rough road past the Alberta-British Columbia border and had reached the Kinuseo Falls, where a fishing resort was established. However, the war brought an end to Monkman's highway project.

He died on September 26, 1941, back at Grande Prairie. His legacy lives on in the names of British Columbia's Monkman Provincial Park and Monkman Falls. The book People of the Pass A Human interest Story of the Monkman Pass by Madelon Flint Truax and Beth Flint Sheehan, chronicles the struggle for a road through the pass.
