= Solitude Range =

Mountain range in British Columbia, Canada

- Location within British Columbia

Highest point
- Peak: Mount Stephenson
- Elevation: 2,037 m (6,683 ft)
- Prominence: 855 m (2,805 ft)
- Listing: Mountains of British Columbia
- Coordinates: 55°24′53″N 122°17′55″W

Dimensions
- Area: 766 km^{2} (296 mi^{2})

Geography
- Country: Canada
- Province: British Columbia
- Parent range: Misinchinka Ranges

Solitude Range is a subdivision range of the Misinchinka Ranges of the Hart Ranges of the Northern Rockies in British Columbia, Canada. The boundaries of the Solitude Range generally lie between the Murray Range and Mountain Creek to the west, Le Moray Creek to the east, the Pine River to the north and Mount Merrick to the south.

Several mountains in the range are named after local area Canadian soldiers killed in action during World War II.

== Prominent Peaks ==
Official Mountains of the Solitude Range
Rank	Mountain Peak	Coordinates	Elevation (m/ft)		Prom. (m/ft)		Isolation	Nearest Higher Neighbor
1	Mount Stephenson	55°24′53″N 122°17′55″W	2,037	6,683	855	2,805	22.0 km S	Grant Peak
2	Howling Wolves Peak	55°19′49″N 122°7′48″W	1,994	6,542	557	1,827	14.2 km WNW	Mount Stephenson
3	Mount Gilliland	55°21′20″N 122°11′55″W	1,940	6,360	516	1,693	5.2 km ESE	Howling Wolves Peak
4	Watson Peak	55°13′41″N 122°5′22″W	1,923	6,309	611	2,005	8.5 km W	Unnamed Peak
5	Goodrich Peak	55°20′53″N 122°4′52″W	1,888	6,194	233	764	3.7 km WSW	Howling Wolves Peak
6	Brazion Peak	55°19′33″N 122°9′41″W	1,813	5,948	264	866	1.4 ENE	Howling Wolves Peak
7	Mount Merrick	55°10′58″N 121°55′38″W	1,749	5,738	294	965	9.4 km W	Mount Jilg
8	Mount Le Moray	55°27′8″N 122°28′39″W	1,728	5,669	348	1,142	12.0 km ESE	Unnamed Peak
9	Pyramis Peak	55°30′60″N 122°26′28″W	1,723	5,653	216	709	7.5 km SSW	Mount Le Moray
10	Solitude Mountain	55°29′22″N 122°36′24″W	1,574	5,164	564	1,850	5.9 km SSW	Unnamed Peak
