= Pioneer Range =

Mountain range in British Columbia, Canada

- Location within British Columbia Location within Canada

Highest point
- Peak: Mount Bulley
- Elevation: 2,471 m (8,107 ft)
- Listing: Mountains of British Columbia
- Coordinates: 54°29′02″N 120°58′48″W

Dimensions
- Area: 310 km^{2} (120 mi^{2})

Geography
- Country: Canada
- Province: British Columbia
- Range coordinates: 54°39′N 122°17′W
- Parent range: Misinchinka Ranges
- Topo map: NTS 93I11 Monkman Pass

The Pioneer Range is a small subdivision range of the Misinchinka Ranges of the Hart Ranges of the Northern Rockies in British Columbia, Canada. The boundaries of the Pioneer Range are generally the Murray River to the east, Monkman Glacier to the west, Imperial Creek to the north and the Limestone Lakes to the south. The majority of the Pioneer Range lies within Monkman Provincial Park.

The range is collectively named after individuals who participated in the pre-World War II efforts to construct a road through the area from Beaverlodge, Alberta to the Fraser River.

== Official Peaks ==
Official Peaks of the Pioneer Range
Rank	Mountain Peak	Coordinates	Elevation (m/ft)		Prom. (m/ft)		Isolation	Nearest Higher Neighbour
1	Mount Bulley	54°29'02''N 120°58'48''W	2,471	8,107	959	3,146	7.9 km ESE	Weaver Peak
2	The Shark's Fin	54°40'04''N 121°16'25''W	2,336	7,664	529	1,736	14.2 km W	Unnamed Peak
3	Ice Mountain	54°24'41''N 121°08'25''W	2,327	7,635	1,257	4,124	13.0 km ENE	Mount Bulley
4	Boone Taylor Peak	54°40'46''N 121°17'27''W	2,326	7,631	424	1,391	1.7 km ESE	The Shark's Fin
5	Mount Watts	54°36'16''N 121°05'44''W	2,308	7,572	881	2,890	11.3 km ESE	Unnamed Peak
6	Paxton Peak	54°32'10''N 121°07'32''W	2,272	7,454	662	2,172	7.9 km NNE	Mount Watts
7	Mount Gauthier	54°38'11''N 121°16'06''W	2,170	7,120	349	1,145	1.9 km N	Unnamed Peak
8	Castle Mountain	54°41'28''N, 121°14'01''W	2,156	7,073	312	1,024	2.6 km SW	Unnamed Peak
9	Mount Jim Young	54°36'49''N 121°17'55''W	2,054	6,739	203	666	3.2 km NE	Mount Gauthier
10	Forgetmenot Mountain	54°28'25''N 121°15'14''W	1,826	5,991	189	620	2.7 km W	Unnamed Peak
