= Little Mac Ski Hill =

Community-operated ski area

Coordinates: 55°20′22″N 123°04′35″W

Little Mac Ski Hill, known as Little Mac, is a community-operated ski area adjacent to Mackenzie, British Columbia, Canada in the northern Rocky Mountain Trench. The area has one tow lift and vertical differential of 90 m (295 ft). The longest run is 210 m (689 ft). In addition to downhill skiing, the hill also has areas for tobogganing and snowboarding. The hill itself is connected to John Dahl Regional Park which features groomed cross-country ski trails and eventually connects to the Mackenzie Recreation Centre. In 2021 an outdoor ice rink was opened in the park and was open to members of the public to use. Though not directly part of the ski area, there are an additional 32 km (20 mi) of groomed and lit cross-country ski trails immediately accessible from the town of Mackenzie, with three specially built warming huts.

In summer months, the side of Little Mac has mountain biking trails that link to Morfee Lake. These trails feature wooden jumps and embankments as well as trails for differing ability levels.

Little Mac Ski Hill is funded by the District of Mackenzie and is maintained through the municipality of Mackenzie. All matters regarding Little Mac Ski Hill are handled by public works in Mackenzie. Little Mac is one of the main tourist attractions of Mackenzie, British Columbia. Even though the hill itself is very small, the close proximity to the town of Mackenzie makes it popular for families and children of all ages.

It was announced on July 25, 2008, that the ski area would receive $160,000 from the Towns for Tomorrow program of the provincial government to rebuild the Little Mac Ski Chalet.

== 2018 closure ==
In 2018, it was announced that Little Mac Ski Hill would not operate for the 2018/19 ski season. A community engagement program was established, and the intent of re-opening the ski hill was announced late 2018. As of 2019, the community's response was overwhelmingly in favour of the re-opening of the ski hill, citing that it was an important asset to the community. The hill re-opened for the 2020/2021 ski season to great success and demand.
