= Monkman Pass =

Mountain pass in British Columbia, Canada

- Location within British Columbia
- Elevation: 1,061 m (3,481 ft)

Third Approach
- Location: British Columbia, Canada
- Range: Canadian Rockies
- Coordinates: 54°33′00″N 121°15′00″W
- Topo map: NTS 93I11 Monkman Pass

Monkman Pass, in the Canadian Rockies, is southwest of Tumbler Ridge and northeast of Hansard. Found in the Hart Ranges, some consider this mountain pass as the southern limit of the informal grouping known as the Northern Rockies, although those are occasionally reckoned as extending farther southeast to Mount Ovington or even to Mount Robson.

The pass is at the head of the Murray River and south of the height of land at the head of the Parsnip River.

Monkman Pass forms part of Monkman Provincial Park. Like the park, Monkman Lake, Monkman Creek and Monkman Falls, it was named after Alexander Monkman.

== History ==
=== Discovery ===
By the 1920s, Monkman Pass had been a First Nations travel route for some 300 years.

Alex Monkman was a pioneer trader and trapper in the Peace Country. According to his account, while on a westward trapping and hunting trip in the 1921/22 winter, he realized he had crossed the continental divide through a lower pass, either on locating a spike from the 1904 Grand Trunk survey, or on meeting trappers who had canoed from the Fraser River.

St. Pierre Gauthier (c.1850–c.1930), is also claimed as the discoverer. With a skilled eye for topography, he was reputed to be an expert trail locator. Of French-Cree ancestry, he spoke some English but was otherwise illiterate. Supposedly, after leading Monkman to the pass, the latter, being literate and well known, assumed the credit.

Hank Munro, a leading trapper in the area, was acknowledged by George Woosley as the true discoverer. Allegedly, Munro informed Monkman of its existence when railway fever was gripping the region.

=== Railway proposal ===
During the early 1900s, grain and cattle from the Peace Country in Alberta and B.C. were primarily exported to the west coast by way of Edmonton—a circuitous 1,441 miles (2,319 km) by rail to Vancouver, which by a direct route would be only 733 miles (1,180 km). By 1920, grain prices were low and freight rates high, and many settlers, who had been attracted by repeated government assurances that a line would be built imminently, were forced to abandon their holdings.

Monkman reported his findings to the Canadian Pacific Railway (CPR) and the Canadian National Railway (CNR), and guided reconnaissance engineer E. Murray Hill through the pass in 1923. When CNR president, Sir Henry Thornton, visited the Peace Country in 1924, he promised to build a railroad westward when the region produced tonnage equal to 10 million imperial bushels (360,000 m^{3}) of wheat. That volume surpassed within two years, no railway materialized.

The Grand Trunk Pacific Railway (GTP) surveys during 1904–06 examined a Wapiti Pass line southwestward to Hansard, as did the 1920s surveys through Monkman Pass, with the latter offering a superior grade west of the Canadian Rockies. Via the CNR at Hansard would be 150 miles (240 km) shorter than either the Pine or Peace passes for shipping Peace wheat, and would require less than 160 miles (260 km) of new track to connect with the CPR controlled Edmonton, Dunvegan and British Columbia Railway. However, a branch line northwest from Brule, Alberta was the CNR preference.

The CNR, reliant upon an unenthusiastic parliament for funding, and satisfied with their Yellowhead crossing, and the CPR leaning toward the Pine or Peace, Monkman Pass presented a compromise proposal that connected CNR tracks to the west with CPR tracks to the east. If a further line through the mountains were economically viable, railway survey engineers favoured the Monkman route, because of lighter snowfall and no chance of slides in a 0.25-mile (0.40 km) wide pass at its narrowest.

Bypassing their farms, this option drew protest from the northern Peace. Residents unfairly compared this choice to the then Pacific Great Eastern Railway (PGE), which "started nowhere, ended nowhere, and served no settlers". For nearly 100 miles (160 km) of the Monkman route, there were neither mines, good agricultural land nor timber belts. The Brule branch, or a modified alternative through Obed, Alberta, equally lacked appeal.

The respective cost estimates were: Obed $13,336,000; Monkman Pass $16,092,000; and Pine Pass $21,472,000. In terms of cost benefit, the federal government favoured Monkman, but the CNR and CPR chose Obed. For all participants, delay, not construction, was their prime objective. The exercise created some uncertainty as to whether the PGE would build through the Monkman Pass or follow its earlier surveys north toward the Pine or Peace passes. In 1928, the PGE conducted a joint survey with the CNR and CPR of these three possible routes. Meanwhile, British capitalists were considering building a Monkman line independent of the CNR or CPR.

During 1930, one of the four CPR survey parties in the Canadian Rockies examined the Monkman, but unspecified doubts harmed its ranking. When a boat freighting supplies to this survey camp capsized in the McGregor River, one of the two occupants drowned.

Though the Peace Pass was favoured, the projected traffic did not warrant the expenditure, but the railway companies were open to the federal government constructing a line. By 1937, the volunteer work on the Monkman road renewed a vision for a rail line. Politicians lamented that if the existence of the Monkman Pass had been known earlier, it could well have become a rail route, but the GTP rationale makes the claim questionable. The slump in the Asian wheat trade in the 1930s terminated any national interest.

In 1953, a storm of protest erupted from the northern Peace when B.C. and Alberta discussed the possibility of routing the proposed PGE line through the Monkman Pass. In 1958, the PGE opened a Pine Pass link from Prince George to Dawson Creek, where the line connected with the Northern Alberta Railways. One reason for this choice was that the Monkman option would have delayed the opening until 1960.

By the late 1970s, a railway line through the Monkman Pass area was foreseen as part of developing the Tumbler Ridge coal deposits. Reversing an agreement for the CNR to build the line through the pass, the B.C. government opted for the more expensive alternative of a BC Rail Tumbler Ridge Subdivision, passing 30 miles (48 km) northwest of the pass. Having five times the length of tunnelling and worse grades, this choice repeated the fiascos of the Dease Lake and Fort Nelson extensions. Although BC Hydro had previously decided not to dam the McGregor River, the government had apparently not ruled out this option. Consequently, the alternative proposal via Hansard had assessed this possibility.

Sharp curves and long unventilated tunnels were a feature of the line built. Channeled away from live overhead wires, water pouring from the roof of one tunnel section beneath a lake was called the "carwash". With coal mines closing between 2000–03 on the Tumbler Ridge Subdivision, the government did not recover its $400 million capital investment before progressively abandoning parts of the route. After temporarily recommissioning the line, a loaded 13-car coal train derailed in 2007, as did a 15-car loaded train in 2014. The line abandoned in 2014, CNR continued to transport coal over a circuitous route, until the whole line reopened after a six-month rehabilitation in 2017.

=== Highway Proposal, Construction Progress & Impact ===
In 1925, the Surveyor General released a report on constructing a wagon road. After frustration in not securing a direct rail link, the Peace Country newspapers launched a campaign to build a highway from Prince George via Hansard and the Monkman Pass to Beaverlodge, Alberta. Ideal for tourism, transporting produce would be limited, because weather conditions would restrict its use to four or five months a year. The Wapiti Pass, an alternative route, suffered the same deficiency.

A 1933 petition signed by affected residents urged the federal government to provide a highway. Parliament debated the proposal of building through either the Peace, Pine, Wapiti or Monkman passes. Tired of waiting, a group gathered at a 1936 meeting in Arthur Smith's farmhouse near Lake Saskatoon, Alberta. They formed the Monkman Pass Highway Association to construct a 132-mile (212 km) road between Rio Grande, Alberta, and the highway at Hansard, following the route previously surveyed by the railways. Arthur became publicity director. A dirt road already existed from Beaverlodge to Rio Grande.

This route (newspaper overview map) would be cheaper than the circuitous Turgeon Highway, which was under construction, but progressing slowly. Federal funding for both highways was highly unlikely. Initially, the Yellowhead Highway Association believed the proposal equally jeopardized their potential funding for linking Longworth with McBride, but ultimately lent their support. The Monkman team persevered with their lobbying of the federal and provincial governments, maintaining the position that all such projects were worthy of support. George Richardson drove cattle through the pass in 1937.

Work commenced from Rio Grande in June 1937. The 20-man crew each volunteered two weeks labour, after which they were eligible for an additional two weeks at $1 a day plus board. The Alberta government loaned used tents, and citizens donated tools, stores, labour and money. The route would reduce the auto journey from the Peace Country to Vancouver by 900 miles (1,400 km). By mid-August, the 65-mile (105 km) Beaverlodge-Stoney Lake section was passable by vehicle. For the 47-mile (76 km) Stoney Lake-McGregor River portion, packhorses were needed. For the 20-mile (32 km) McGregor River-Hansard balance, an advance party led by Alex Monkman had blazed a trail. The Rio Grande-Stoney Lake road was not initially suitable for a car, but a truck with some help up gullies and stream banks could achieve five mph (8 km/h). By yearend, newspapers across Canada had published maps of the proposed highway, but politicians remained focused upon the Turgeon highway. Fundraising efforts continued and further branches of the association formed. The B.C. government provided no financial support, nor did Ottawa, but some politicians voiced their approval.

In the summer, a 250-man Alberta crew recommenced the work, keeping connected to the Finlay Forks radiotelephone station by a portable radio transmitter. A four-man B.C. team surveying a Herrick River-Hansard route through the McGregor River country experienced a narrow escape from wildlife. When a party of four, guided by trapper Martin Framstad, carried a symbolic 50-pound sack of Marquis Wheat (grown on Arthur Smith's farm) across the pass, it was the first commercial produce to come directly overland from the Peace Country. Their travails included four days of driving rain, and nearly drowning on the north fork of the swift McGregor River. At this point, they abandoned their packhorses and carried everything on their backs for the final 10 miles (16 km), emerging at the CNR line three miles (4.8 km) east of Hansard.

By July, in addition to loaning camping equipment, the Alberta government had provided slip and Fresno scrapers and plows for the 15-mile (24 km) section within that province. While the Rio Grande-Stoney Lake section awaited final grading, the next 20 miles were passable by truck and a pack trail existed for the remainder. Proceeding from Hansard, by month end, the three-man-slashing crew had created a 10-foot wide trail for five miles (8 km). Meanwhile, Rio Grande-Kinuseo Falls was passable by truck. A 60-foot length bridge across the river was under construction. Three weeks later, the western end was at the six-mile (10 km) mark, with a trail for the 8–10 miles to the McGregor/Herrick crossing. Funding limited the crew size and progress.

In mid-September, the "Pathfinder" car (a 1927 Model T Ford, modified as a light truck fitted with a ruckstel axle to improve gearing), headed westward with a set of replacement parts. Meanwhile, reporters from two national newspapers journeyed the route, completing the final section from the McGregor to Hansard by boat. Expected in Prince George by early November, the "Pathfinder" had struggled through days of one-foot deep snow, before Francis Murphy's 16-man and four-horse team reached Henry Hobi's cabin at the junction of Moose Creek and Herrick River. Having covered 39 miles (63 km) from Kinuseo Falls, they met Ole Hanson, who had waited weeks with his boat. The local trappers had cut four miles (6.4 km) of virgin bush and assisted the hauling. After transporting out the sick passengers, the frozen river prevented the boat's return. The planned ferrying of the vehicle down the McGregor River to Hansard postponed indefinitely would undermine the publicity opportunity. Both Canadian and international newspapers had widely reported the roadbuilding effort.

In June 1939, repairs began on the 75 miles (121 km) of completed road, with the Alberta government assuming responsibility for the section within its border. The federal government agreed to match any funds the B.C. government spent on the road, but the latter, regarding the road primarily a federal responsibility, made no financial commitments. Although originally proposing a regular service to Monkman Lake, the specially equipped tractor busses only ran as far as Kinuseo Falls. Leaving Beaverlodge at 8 am, they arrived at the falls the next morning. That summer, an eight-man crew continued tackling the Hansard end of the road. The endeavour continued during the earlier months of World War II, but afterward ceased beyond maintaining the eastern section.

The lodge at Kinuseo Falls, and the lodge, general store and restaurant at Stony Lake, which sprang up, received considerable patronage. Attempts to revive efforts for a connecting highway continued. With the Alaska Highway a reality, Monkman Pass again became a contender for the highway link with Prince George. Although surveyed, it lost out to Pine Pass. As the war progressed, the lodges closed. Following the war, the B.C. government prohibited any further work on the road.

While making a Beaverlodge-Hansard hike in the summer of 1951, a trio's encounter with fellow beings was limited to a few First Nations campers at Stony Lake and Henry Hobi at his Fontoniko Creek cabin. By 1956, The Hansard-Grande Prairie route was one of a series of isolated locations in need of pioneer roads to access natural resources. The next year, Ferry Strobl of Pine Pass was one of a party of three local men who visited the abandoned "Pathfinder". Following an intense 1961 air and land search, a long overdue father and his two young sons, attempting to reach Hansard, were rescued five miles (8 km) south of Monkman Lake. In 1967, a 17-member team, including Gerry Stojan, one of the original drivers, retrieved the "Pathfinder", bringing it first to Prince George to complete its historic journey. It continued to Grande Prairie for restoration and display in the Grande Prairie Museum.

In 1976, Wayne Monkman, in the footsteps of his grandfather, Alexander Monkman, led a nine-member attempt to cross the pass in four-wheel-drive trucks. Travelling from the west, the deep muddy logging roads delayed their progress. When their permit to cross the salmon-spawning Fontoniko Creek expired, the expedition prematurely ended. Government officials denied a further request to access the area from the east. When a fuel tanker overturned the following year, 2,000 gallons of spilled diesel exploded, killing the driver.

Despite widespread local support, the government opposed a road through the pass as part of developing the Tumbler Ridge coal deposits, possibly owing to a potential McGregor dam. Rejecting the $100-million Monkman option, the province spent $94 million on a Chetwynd-Tumbler Ridge highway, but the region continued to lobby for a Monkman link.

=== Aircraft ===
In 1938, United Air Transport (UAT) began flying their Prince George-Edmonton route via Monkman Pass. The next year, UAT, renamed Yukon Southern Air Transport (YSAT), introduced a direct Prince George-Grande Prairie route over the pass.

In 1965, when Prince George lumber executive Ross Davis’ light plane went missing on a flight from Grande Prairie to Prince George, it prompted a 10-day aerial search in the pass area. Six weeks later, the apparent sighting of wreckage triggered a resumption of the search, but this was determined to be just a patch of ice. The following month, a helicopter pilot made a chance discovery of the Cessna 180 wreckage in a lonely wind swept canyon near the pass. Accompanied by two police officers, this pilot recovered the body. The same year, a solo pilot, flying from Grande Prairie to Chetwynd, became lost overnight in a blinding snowstorm in the Monkman Pass area. Low on fuel, the Cessna 180 safely landed on a small airstrip.

In 1974, a Piper Apache made an emergency landing onto the frozen Monkman Lake. Spending 24 hours in the crashed plane, the three occupants suffered from minor to serious injuries.

=== Oil & Natural Gas Development ===
Premier Pattullo, a prospector for oil during the late 1930s, adopted an obstructive exploration policy while in government, which motivated the oil companies to help fund the Liberal party defeat in the 1941 provincial elections. His successor, Premier Hart, offered 160 acres on which to drill. His informing lessees they could sell the gas, but any oil would be the property of the province, crushed any incentive to invest.

In the 1920s, while George Richardson was homesteading near Monkman Pass, an old prospector insisted fossils indicated the presence of oil, but the evidence was largely ignored. The natural gas seeping from the ground, which attracted clawing bears, had no immediate value. Using the partially built road to access the area, a syndicate led by George made a major oil discovery in 1952, which attracted the attention of oil companies and news reporters. Stanolind Oil struck oil in 1956, but no B.C. wells had moved from the drilling stage to production. The following year, Richfield Oil Corp. abandoned a runaway gas well after spending over $2 million, because of equipment losses and misinterpreting seismograph findings.

During the 1960s, as one of three possible routes for the Taylor-Kamloops oil pipeline route, the pass was rejected because its inaccessibility would hamper maintenance. Under contract to the Peace River Petroleums and Central del Rio consortium, Gray Oil Co. drilled for natural gas two miles (3.2 km) south of Stony Lake in Grizzly Valley, near the abandoned Richfield well. Gray Oil also drilled nine miles (14 km) south of Stony Lake for a Peace River Petroleums, Richfield, Central Del Rio, Northwest Pacific Development and Grizzly Valley Gas and Oil Co., consortium. The area represented the biggest gas-bearing anticline ln Western Canada.

One well produced eight million cubic feet of sweet gas daily, but alone was insufficient to build a pipeline. Further unsuccessful and productive wells were drilled. A planned natural gas pipeline to Northwood pulp mill in Prince George was scrapped. To survive financially, Peace River Petroleums entered a partnership with Imperial Oil, which assumed all drilling costs, but the former was soon delisted from the Vancouver Stock Exchange for failing to file relevant statements.

The switch to natural gas encouraged exploration in the 1960s, but drilling intensified owing to the 1973 oil crisis. Another exploding natural gas well was capped within days. The Alberta and Southern group sought to connect the Monkman field to their Alberta pipeline network. In 1993, BP Canada found huge gas reserves in the Monkman Pass area. In 2008, Spectra Energy connected the Grizzly Valley to its pipeline network, but five years later, the company deactivated segments of pipeline in response to falling production.
