= Atunatche Creek =

River in British Columbia, Canada

Location
- Country: Canada
- Province: British Columbia
- Regional District: Fraser Fort-George

Physical characteristics
- Source
  - location: Azouzetta Lake
  - coordinates: 55°22′23″N 122°36′9″W
- Mouth
  - location: Misinchinka River
  - coordinates: 55°20′26″N 122°35′55″W
- Length: 4.6 km (2.9 mi)

Basin features
- River system: Parsnip River Watershed

Atunatche Creek is a small river in the Hart Ranges of the Northern Rockies of British Columbia.

Atunatche Creek adopted 2 September 1954 on 93 O, as labelled on BC map 3C, 1923. Had been labelled "Tillicum Creek" on BC map 3E, 1922. "Atunatche Creek (not Tillicum)" identified in 1930 BC Gazetteer. Origin/significance not known.

== Tributaries ==
- Declier Creek
