= Sentinel Peak (British Columbia) =

Isolated mountain in British Columbia

- Location within British Columbia Location within Canada

Highest point
- Elevation: 2,513 m (8,245 ft)
- Prominence: 1,452 m (4,764 ft)
- Parent peak: Limestone Peak (2661 m)
- Isolation: 76.5 km (47.5 mi)
- Listing: Canada most isolated peaks 56th; Mountains of British Columbia
- Coordinates: 54°54′29″N 121°57′40″W

Geography
- Country: Canada
- Province: British Columbia
- District: Cariboo Land District
- Parent range: Misinchinka Ranges
- Topo map: NTS 93I13 Sentinel Peak

Sentinel Peak, is a 2,513-metre (8,245 ft) isolated, prominent limestone peak, west of the Continental Divide in British Columbia, Canada. It is highest summit in Misinchinka Ranges, a subdivision range of the Hart Ranges within the Northern Rocky Mountains.

It is located approximately 120 km (75 mi) northeast of Prince George, BC.

== Nearby ==
- Mount Ovington (2,949 m (9,675 ft))
- Mount Crysdale (2,429 m (7,969 ft))
- Limestone Peak (2,661 m (8,730 ft))
- Mount Barton (2,390 m (7,840 ft))
