= Misinchinka Ranges =

Mountain range in British Columbia, Canada

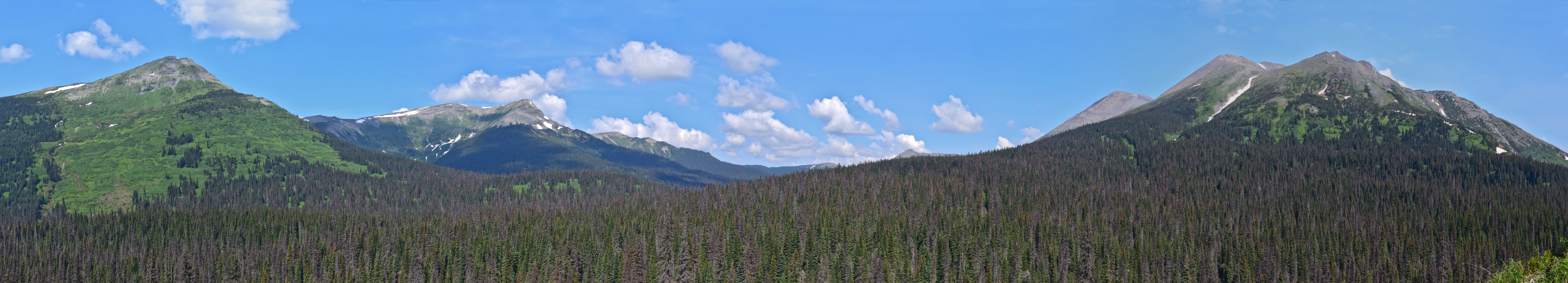
- Misinchinka Ranges south of Mount Kinney.

Highest point
- Peak: Sentinel Peak
- Elevation: 2,513 m (8,245 ft)
- Listing: Mountains of British Columbia

Dimensions
- Area: 9,276 km^{2} (3,581 mi^{2})

Geography
- Location within British Columbia
- Country: Canada
- Province: British Columbia
- Range coordinates: 55°10′00″N 122°30′00″W
- Parent range: Hart Ranges

Misinchinka Ranges, is the largest subdivision range of the Hart Ranges, of the Northern Rockies in British Columbia, Canada. The boundaries of the Misinchinka Ranges generally lie between the Rocky Mountain Trench to the west, Clearwater Creek and the Sukunka River to the east, the Peace Arm of Williston Reservoir to the north and Monkman Provincial Park to the south.

The Misinchinka Range contains 33 officially named mountain peaks, including one ultra-prominent peak, Mount Crysdale.

Many peaks within the range are named for local Canadian soldiers killed in action during World War I and World War II.

While there are no permanent settlements within the Misinchinka Ranges, the range is bordered by the communities of Mackenzie, Bear Lake, Tumbler Ridge and Prince George and lies within the traditional territories of the Treaty 8 First Nations; Blueberry River First Nation, Doig River First Nation, Halfway River First Nation, Mcleod Lake Indian Band, Saulteau First Nation and West Moberly First Nation.

Two 6.0 kilometre electrified train tunnels were constructed by BC Rail through the Misinchinka Range in the early 1980s to connect the coal mines of Tumbler Ridge to the provincial rail network. The line ceased operations in 2000.

The 670 km (416 mi) Coastal GasLink Pipeline project will pass through the Misinchinka Range between Mount Kinney and Alexis Peak. Construction began in 2019 and is expected to be in service in 2023.

== Sub-Ranges ==
- Murray Range
- Pioneer Range
- Solitude Range

== Prominent Peaks ==
Official Mountains of the Misinchinka Range With At Least 500 Metres of Topographic Prominence
| Rank | Mountain Peak | Coordinates | Elevation (m/ft) | | Prominence (m/ft) | | Isolation | Nearest Higher Neighbour |
|---|---|---|---|---|---|---|---|---|
| 1 | Sentinel Peak | 54°54′29″N 121°57′40″W | 2,513 | 8,245 | 1,454 | 4,770 | 86.5 km ESE | Weaver Peak |
| 2 | Mount Vreeland | 54°34′2.6″N 121°26′7.4″W | 2,464 | 8,084 | 1,275 | 4,183 | 30.3 km SE | Mount Bulley |
| 3 | Mount Crysdale | 55°56′17.5″N 123°25′17.4″W | 2,427 | 7,963 | 1,548 | 5,079 | 104.7 km N | Unnamed Peak |
| 4 | Mount Selwyn | 55°59′30″N 123°36′24″W | 2,291 | 7,516 | 950 | 3,120 | 11.8 km ESE | Unnamed Peak |
| 5 | Mount Dudzic | 54°56′20.4″N 121°52′4.8″W | 2,169 | 7,116 | 746 | 2,448 | 6.9 km WSW | Sentinel Peak |
| 6 | Alexis Peak | 55°2′56.400″N 122°1′49.800″W | 2,123 | 6,965 | 593 | 1,946 | 14.3 km ESE | Unnamed Peak |
| 7 | Mount Myhon | 54°47′5.3″N 121°31′25.7″W | 2,119 | 6,952 | 659 | 2,162 | 9.6 km SSE | Unnamed Peak |
| 8 | Gable Mountain | 54°30′1″N 121°40′27″W | 2,095 | 6,873 | 665 | 2,182 | 12.5 km ENE | Unnamed Peak |
| 9 | Mount Abbl | 54°42′N 121°40′W | 2,012 | 6,601 | 646 | 2,119 | 12.0 km E | Unnamed Peak |
| 10 | Mount Kinney | 55°5′59.6″N 122°10′28.9″W | 1,996 | 6,549 | 714 | 2,343 | 8.0 km ESE | Unnamed Peak |
| 11 | Mount Whitford | 54°52′2.6″N 121°52′19.9″W | 1,987 | 6,519 | 583 | 1,913 | 6.5 km W | Unnamed Peak |
| 12 | Mount Bracey | 54°54′14.65″N 122°6′20.92″W | 1,954 | 6,411 | 597 | 1,959 | 7.7 km ENE | Unnamed Peak |
| 13 | Mount Aitken | 55°1′8.8″N 122°22′32.2″W | 1,854 | 6,083 | 673 | 2,208 | 15.7 km ENE | Mount Kinney |
| 14 | Old Friend Mountain | 55°15′5.8″N 122°36′56.2″W | 1,844 | 6,050 | 588 | 1,929 | 13.0 km E | Mount Hunter |
| 15 | Mount Morfee | 55°25′53.4″N 123°2′4.9″W | 1,775 | 5,823 | 521 | 1,709 | 22.1 km E | Mount Murray |
| 16 | Lavitah Mountain | 55°13′59.5″N 122°47′16.8″W | 1,699 | 5,574 | 545 | 1,788 | 10.8 km E | Old Friend Mountain |

== Other Mountains ==
Other official mountain peaks under 500 m of prominence include:

Mount Irwin, Azu Mountain, Uguznasechi Mountain, Thabah Mountain, Mount Garbitt, Mount Crocker, Mount Barton, Mount Wendt, Mount McPhee, Patches Mountain, Mount West, Dathseykaly Mountain, Tsahunga Mountain, Mount Thomas, Burden Peak, Mount Emmet, Powder King Peak.
