= Watson Peak (British Columbia) =

Mountain in British Columbia, Canada

- Location within British Columbia Location within Canada

Highest point
- Elevation: 1,923 m (6,309 ft)
- Prominence: 611 m (2,005 ft)
- Parent peak: Unnamed Peak
- Listing: Mountains of British Columbia
- Coordinates: 55°13′41″N 122°05′22″W

Geography
- Country: Canada
- Province: British Columbia
- District: Peace River Land District
- Parent range: Solitude Range
- Topo map: NTS 93O1 Mount Reynolds

Watson Peak, is a 1,923-metre (6,309 ft) mountain in the Solitude Range of the Hart Ranges in Northern British Columbia.

The mountain is named for Canadian Army Private John G. Watson, from Bessborough, northwest of Dawson Creek, BC. Watson served with the Seaforth Highlanders when he was killed in action 17 September 1944, aged 23, in Italy, and was buried at the Coriano Ridge War Cemetery.
