= Mount Reynolds =

Mount Reynolds may refer to:

- Mount Reynolds (Antarctica)
- Mount Reynolds (British Columbia), Canada
- Mount Reynolds (California)
- Mount Reynolds (Montana)
- Mount Reynolds (New Zealand)
- Mount Reynolds (Tasmania), Australia
- Mount Reynolds (Northern Territory), Australia
