= Mount Hunter (British Columbia) =

Mountain in British Columbia, Canada

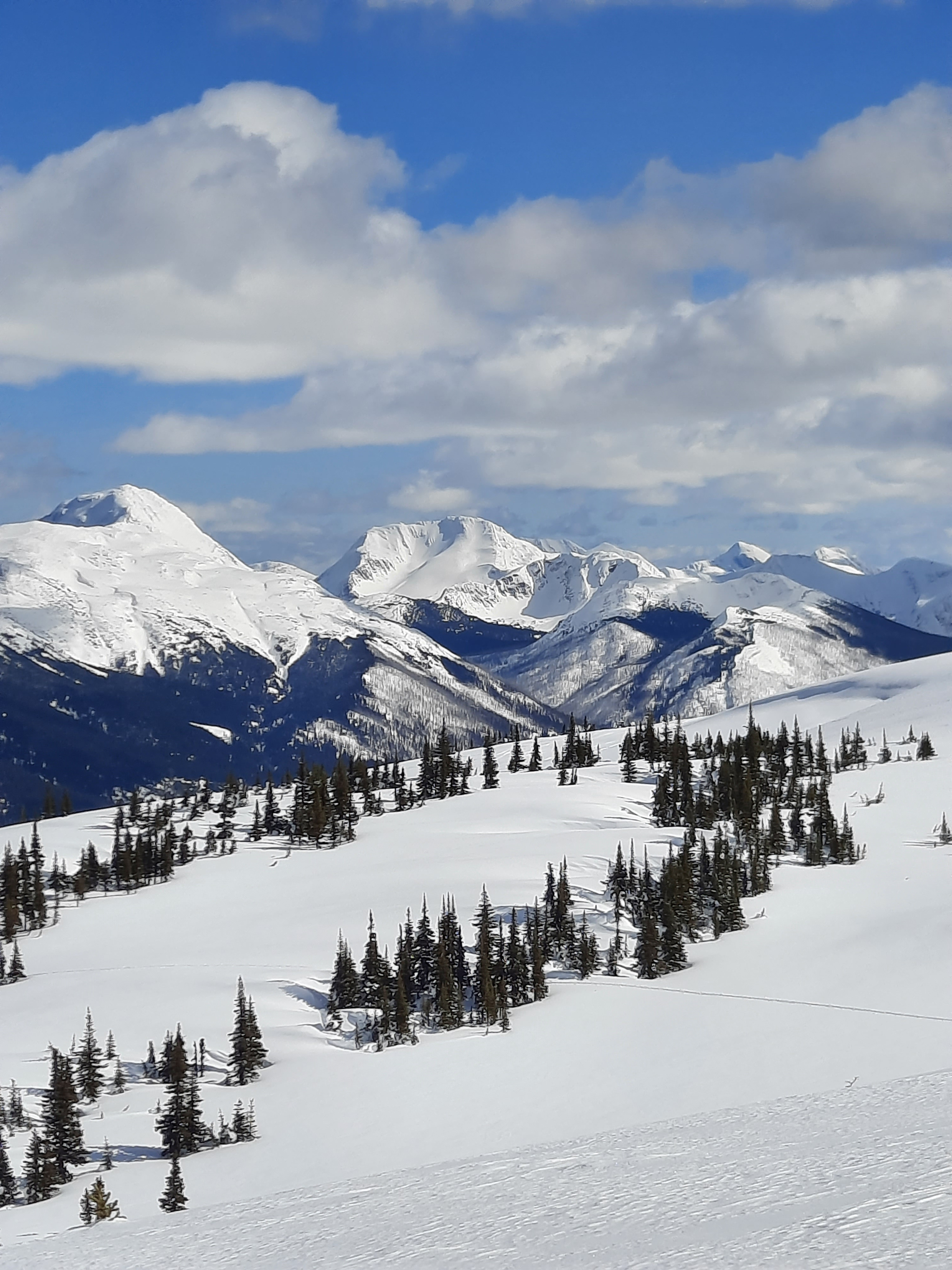

Highest point
- Elevation: 2,032 m (6,667 ft)
- Prominence: 674 m (2,211 ft)
- Parent peak: Grant Peak
- Listing: Mountains of British Columbia
- Coordinates: 55°16′57″N 122°25′10″W

Geography
- Location within British Columbia Location within Canada
- Location: Pine Pass; British Columbia, Canada
- District: Peace River Land District
- Parent range: Murray Range
- Topo map: NTS 93O8 Le Moray Creek

Mount Hunter, is a 2,032-metre (6,667 ft) mountain in the Murray Range of the Hart Ranges in Northern British Columbia. The mountain is within the Pine-Lemoray Provincial Park.
