= Misinchinka River =

Location
- Country: Canada
- Province: British Columbia
- Regional District: Fraser Fort-George
- Land District: Cariboo Land District

Physical characteristics
- Source
  - location: Pine Pass
  - coordinates: 55°11′36″N 122°16′20″W
- Mouth
  - location: Parsnip River
  - coordinates: 55°6′13″N 122°57′32″W
- Length: 106 km (66 mi)
- Basin size: 595 km2

Basin features
- Tributaries
  - left: 2
  - right: 7
- Bridges: 2

The Misinchinka River is a river in the north-central Interior of British Columbia, Canada, rising in the northern Hart Ranges to flow northwest to join the Parsnip River just before that river's estuary into the Parsnip Reach of Lake Williston, part of the Peace-Mackenzie Rivers drainage.

== Tributaries ==
- Atunatche Creek
- Bijoux Creek
- Caswell Creek
- Honeymoon Creek
- Hungry Moose Creek
- Old Friend Creek
- Rolston Creek
- Stack Creek
- Trappers Creek

== See also ==
- List of rivers of British Columbia
