= Watson Peak =

Watson Peak may refer to the following mountains:

== Canada ==
- Watson Peak (British Columbia)

== United States ==
- Watson Peak (Alaska)
- Watson Peak (Arizona) in Yavapai County
- Watson Peak (Custer County, Idaho)
- Watson Peak (Lemhi County, Idaho)

== See also ==
- Watson Peaks, Antarctica
