= Monkman Falls =

Coordinates: 54°38′05″N 121°09′20″W

- Interactive map of Monkman Falls
- Location: Canada

Monkman Falls is a waterfall on Monkman Creek in the Northern Rockies of British Columbia, Canada. It is one of a series of ten waterfalls on Monkman Creek known as "the Cascades". It is named for Alexander Monkman, a fur trader then based in the Peace River Country who discovered Monkman Pass.

== See also ==
- List of waterfalls in British Columbia
- Kinuseo Falls
