= Mount Murray (British Columbia) =

Mountain in British Columbia, Canada

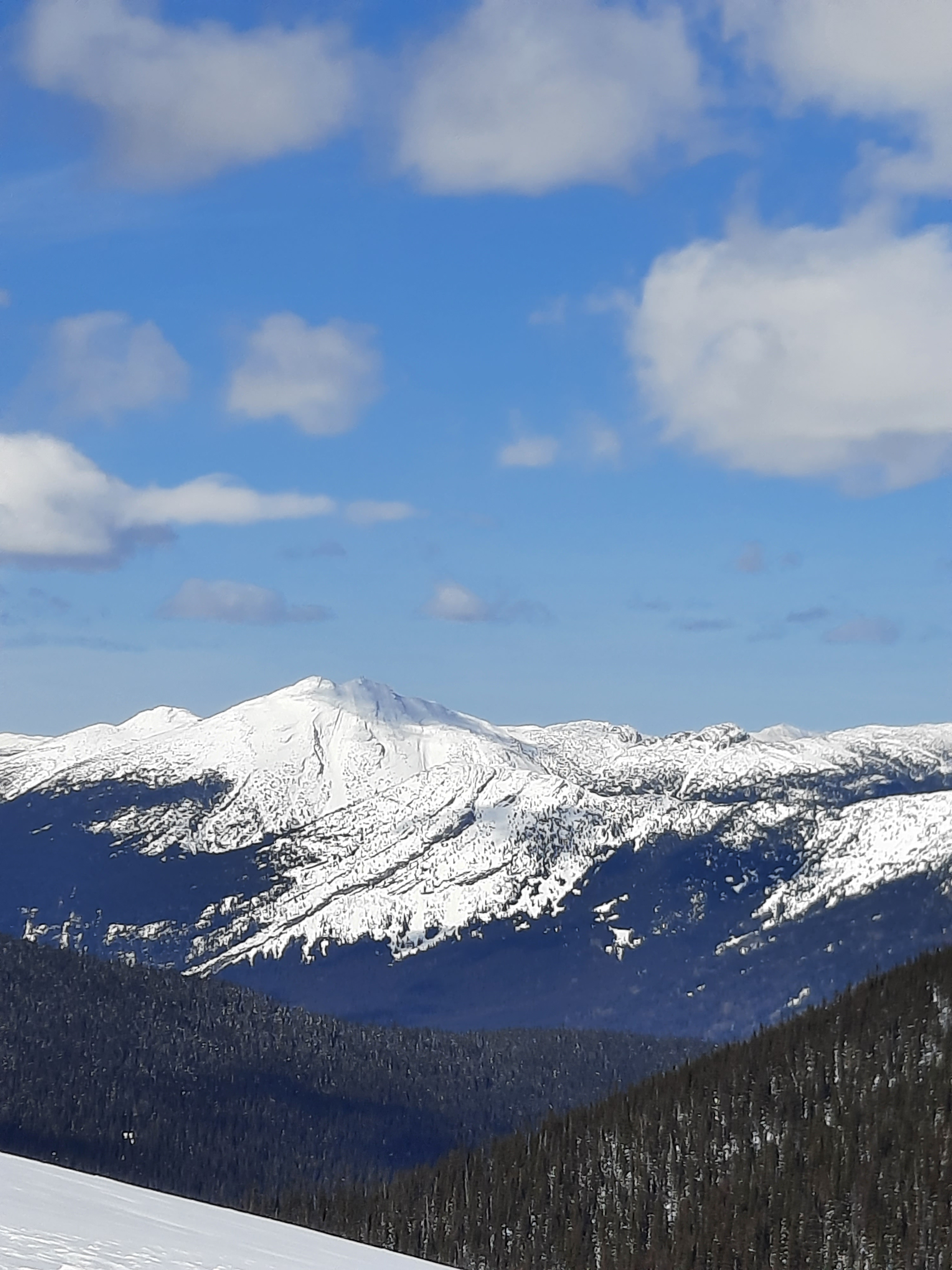

Highest point
- Elevation: 1,802 m (5,912 ft)
- Prominence: 359 m (1,178 ft)
- Parent peak: Unnamed Peak
- Coordinates: 55°27′22″N 122°41′03″W

Geography
- Location within British Columbia Location within Canada
- Interactive map of Mount Murray
- Location: Pine Pass; British Columbia, Canada
- District: Peace River Land District
- Parent range: Murray Range
- Topo map: NTS 93O7 Azouzetta Lake

Mount Murray, is a 1,802-metre (5,912-feet) in the Murray Range of Hart Ranges of Northern British Columbia. The mountain is within the Pine-Lemoray Provincial Park.

Named after N.F. Murray, who in 1915 with G.V. Copley, had conducted the first detailed survey and timber reconnaissance in the area for the British Columbia Forest Service. Murray enlisted with the CEF in 1916 and was killed at the Battle of Vimy Ridge in 1917.

There is a 8.2 kilometre hiking trail to the summit from Highway 97.
