= Morfee Lake =

Lake in British Columbia

Morfee Lakes
- Morfee Lake
- Location within British Columbia
- Location: British Columbia, Canada
- Coordinates: 55°20′25″N 123°04′35″W
- Type: Lake
- Primary inflows: Morfee Creek
- Catchment area: 48 km^{2} (19 sq mi)
- Max. length: 3.6 km (2.2 mi)
- Max. width: 1.6 km (0.99 mi)
- Surface area: 2.93 km^{2} (1.13 sq mi)
- Max. depth: 43 m (141 ft)
- Shore length^{1}: 15.3 km^{2} (5.9 sq mi)
- Surface elevation: 722 m (2,369 ft)
- Islands: 3
- Settlements: Mackenzie, British Columbia
- ^{1} Shore length is not a well-defined measure.

Morfee Lake is a lake within the Misinchinka Ranges of Northern British Columbia and is approximately 2.93 km^{2} (2.2 mi^{2}) in size. It is located within the boundaries of the District of Mackenzie and is also the source of drinking water for the community.

Named after Flight Lieutenant Alan Morfee, Royal Canadian Air Force who flew the earliest air photography of the region in the early 1930s. The nearby Mount Morfee and Morfee Creek are also named after Flight Lieutenant Morfee, as well as an island near Tofino, BC.

The lake has two maintained beaches and one maintained boat launch. The southern half of the lake is reserved for non-motorized boating. A hiking and mountain biking trail extends around the lake and connects to a broader network of trails within the community.

== See also ==
- List of lakes of British Columbia
