= Murray Range =

Mountain Range in British Columbia

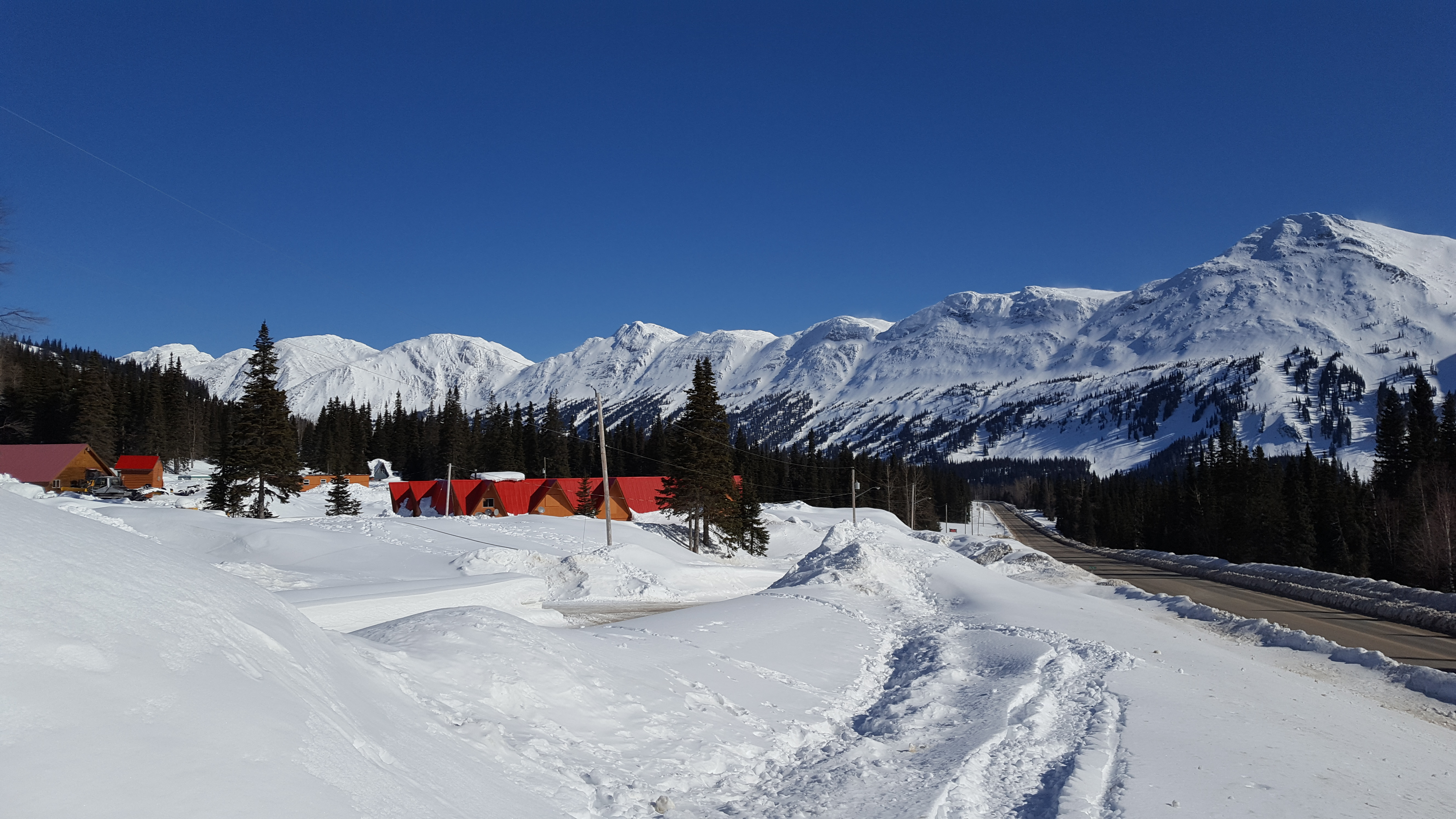
- Murray Range from Highway 97

Highest point
- Peak: Grant Peak
- Elevation: 2,094 m (6,870 ft)
- Prominence: 942 m (3,091 ft)
- Listing: Mountains of British Columbia
- Coordinates: 55°13′02″N 122°16′56″W

Geography
- Location within British Columbia Location within Canada
- Country: Canada
- Province: British Columbia
- Range coordinates: 55°23′29″N 122°34′30″W
- Parent range: Hart Ranges

Murray Range is a subdivision range of the Hart Ranges, of the Northern Rockies in British Columbia, Canada. The majority of the range lies within the Pine-Lemoray Provincial Park and is noted for its snowmobiling, hiking and ski touring opportunities. The boundaries of the Murray Range generally lie between the Misinchinka River to the west and Mountain Creek to the east; the Pine River to the north and Mount Reynolds to the south.

Several mountains in the range are named after local area Canadian soldiers killed in action during World War II and World War I.

== Prominent peaks ==
Official peaks in the Murray Range
Rank	Mountain Peak	Coordinates	Elevation (m/ft)		Prominence (m/ft)		Isolation	Nearest Higher Neighbour
1	Grant Peak	55°13′3″N 122°16′57″W	2,094	6,870	942	3,091	13.8 km SE 11.6 mi SE	Alexis W3
2	Mount Hunter	55°18′46″N 122°25′11″W	2,032	6,667	674	2,211	11.3 ESE 7.0 mi ESE	Grant Peak
3	Milburn Peak	55°15′29″N 122°21′2″W	2,019	6,624	503	1,650	5.1 km WNW 3.1 mi WNW	Mount Hunter
4	Mount Reynolds	55°11′18″N 122°21′38″W	2,004	6,575	583	1,913	5.9 km ENE 3.7 mil ENE	Grant Peak
5	Mount Murray	55°27′22″N 122°41′3″W	1,802	5,912	359	1,178	18.6 km ESE 11.5 mi ESE	Unnamed Peak
