= Finlay Forest Industries =

Defunct Canadian forest products company

- Industry: Forest Products
- Founded: Mackenzie, British Columbia
- Defunct: 2000
- Successor: Abitibi-Consolidated Ltd 2000; AbitibiBowater 2007; Conifex Timber 2010
- Headquarters: Mackenzie, British Columbia
- Products: Forest Products

Finlay Forest Industries was a Canadian forest products company based in Mackenzie, British Columbia.

== History ==
Finlay Forest Industries (FFI) was established in 1970 as a joint venture between Cattermole Timber and two Japanese firms, Jujo Paper and Sumitomo Forestry. In 1980, operations were purchased by British Columbia Forest Products. Slocan Forest Products Ltd. and Donohue Inc. acquired FFI in 1994 as equal co-owners. In 1999, Donohue Inc. completed an $80 million takeover of Finlay Forest Industries. This was followed in 2000, by a $7.1 billion takeover of all Donohue's operations, including their Mackenzie holdings, by Abitibi-Consolidated. As part of this acquisition, FFI was dissolved as a company with operations now under the Abitibi-Consolidated brand.

Abitibi-Consolidated operated the two sawmills, including their associated planer mills, the paper mill, and a steam/power plant until 2008 when the 2008 Recession shutdown all manufacturing operations.

Conifex Timber purchased all assets in 2010 and presently operates one sawmill.
