= CHMM-FM =

Coordinates: 55°22′42″N 123°04′55″W

- Mackenzie, British Columbia; Canada
- Broadcast area: Fraser-Fort George Regional District
- Frequency: 103.5 MHz (FM)
- Branding: CHMM Radio

Programming
- Format: Community radio

Ownership
- Owner: Mackenzie and Area Radio Society

History
- First air date: 2003

Technical information
- ERP: 900 watts
- HAAT: 0 metres

Links
- Website: chmm.ca

CHMM-FM is a community radio station that operates at 103.5 FM in Mackenzie, British Columbia, Canada.

Owned by Mackenzie and Area Radio Society, the station received CRTC approval in 2003.
