= Coriano Ridge War Cemetery =

Military cemetery in Coriano, Italy

- Italian: Cimitero di guerra inglese
- Commonwealth War Graves Commission
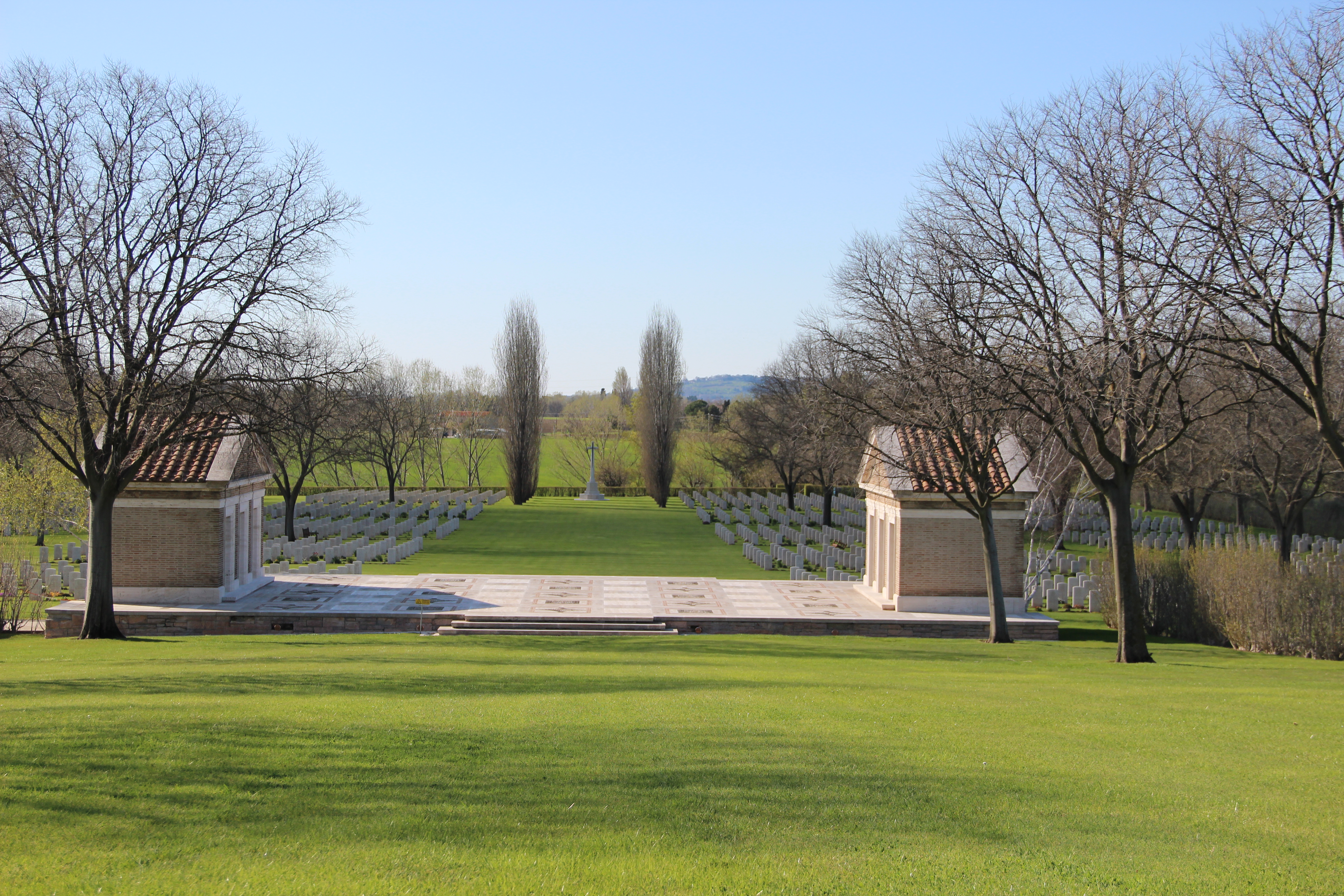
- The cemetery viewed from the entrance, April 2015
- For Allied soldiers deceased in 1944
- Established: April 1945
- Location: 43°59′6.95″N 12°36′11.66″E; Via Piane 4 near Coriano, Emilia-Romagna
- Designed by: Louis de Soissons
- Total burials: 1,939
- Unknowns: c. 50

Burials by nation
- United Kingdom: 1,413; Canadian: 427; New Zealand: 52; South Africa: 28; India: 8; Australia: 1; Russia: 1; Other countries: 3; Unidentified: 7

Burials by war
- World War II: 1,939
- 1939 – 1945 The soil of this cemetery was donated by the Italian people for the eternal rest of the sailors, soldiers, and aviators whose memory is rendered honour here (in Italian)

The Coriano Ridge War Cemetery, locally known as the English War Cemetery (Italian: Cimitero di guerra inglese), is a Commonwealth military cemetery in Coriano, in the region of Emilia-Romagna, northern Italy, for Allied soldiers who died in the Second World War during the Allied advance through the Valconca and the battles of Coriano and Rimini.

Managed by the Rome office of the Commonwealth War Graves Commission, the cemetery numbers 1,939 burials, of which approximately 50 are unidentified. It is among Coriano's most notable tourist attractions.

== History ==
In September 1944, the battles of Coriano and Rimini, from which many of the burials derive, marked the opening stages of the Allied assault on the Gothic Line. In the Battle of Coriano, the British Eighth Army engaged the Wehrmacht from 4 to 13 September. Oliver Leese, the Eighth Army's commander, called the advance to liberate Rimini "one of the hardest battles of the Eighth Army ... comparable to El Alamein, Mareth, and the Gustav Line (Monte Cassino)". Within 37 days of the Battle of Rimini, over 10,000 soldiers had died between the Allied and Axis forces.

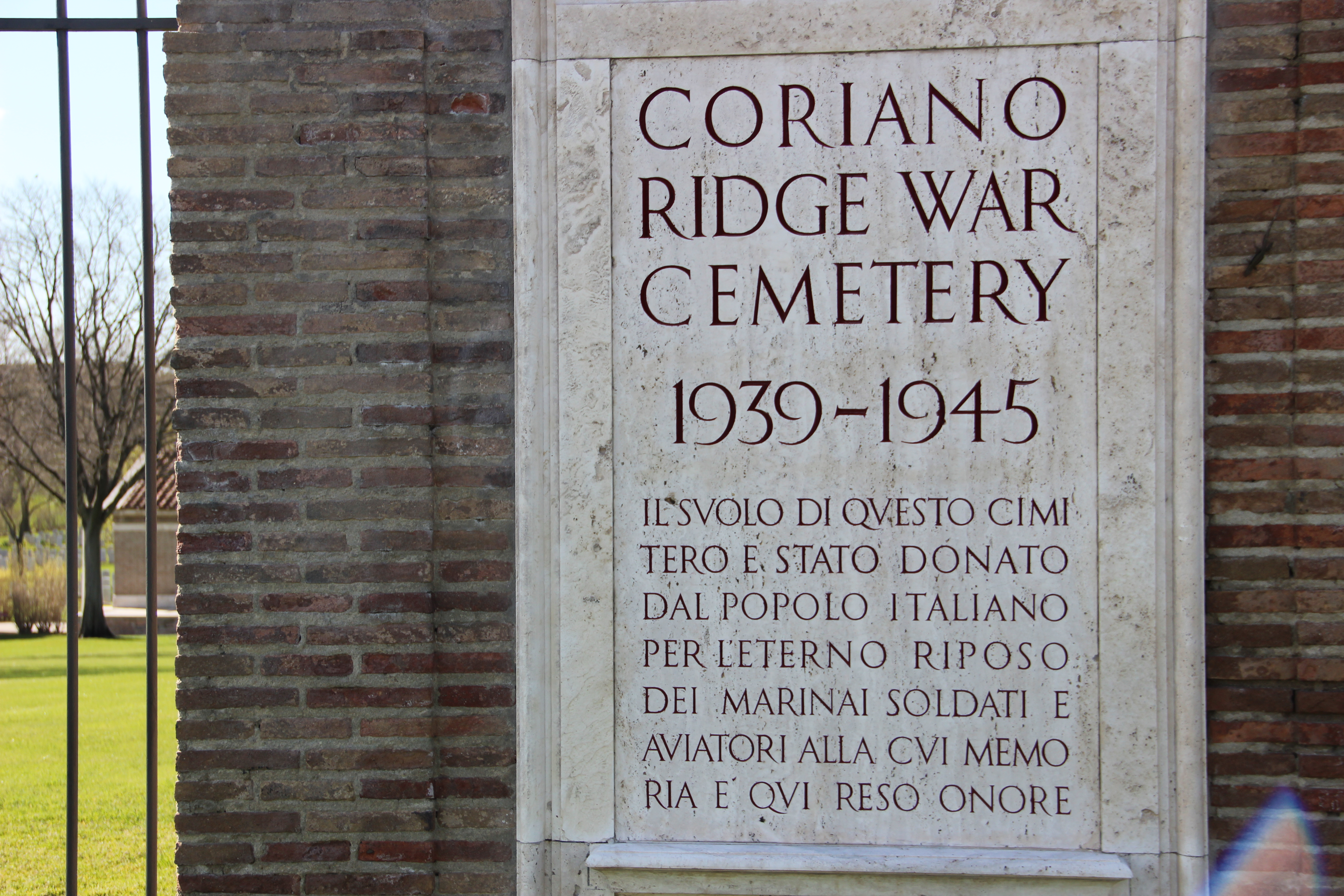
Inscription at the cemetery's entrance, April 2015

Coriano Ridge War Cemetery was constructed in April 1945, using land ceded by the Italian government to the United Kingdom's War Graves Commission, on the road between Rimini and Coriano. Soldiers who had been buried in surrounding battlefields were reinterred in the cemetery, notably including 576 soldiers initially buried in Montescudo who were moved due to the soil's subsidence. The cemetery collected war dead from Rimini, Coriano, coastal settlements, and the Valconca.

The cemetery was renovated in the late 1950s. In its post-war history, the cemetery has hosted several ceremonies commemorating the battles in the area, which have been attended by foreign dignatories and ambassadors. In September 1979, the 35th anniversary ceremony included a visit by Nilde Iotti, President of the Chamber of Deputies, and on 15 May 1980, Prince Edward, Duke of Kent, visited the ceremony as president of the Commonwealth War Graves Commission (CWGC), which manages the cemetery. The cemetery has often been included in veterans' tours of Italy, but since the September 11 attacks in 2001, the visits of family members and veterans are no longer publicised due to the risk of terrorism.

== Layout ==
The cemetery measures 30,000 square metres (320,000 sq ft) in size, on a sloping hill, and exhibits a long, rectangular shape. The main entrance is a double gate, with the grass sloping downhill towards the graves. The cemetery was designed by Louis de Soissons.

The cemetery is divided into sectors, the first of which each consist of 84 tombs, with the last four sectors containing the burials from Montescudo.

The site includes a chapel with a register of buried soldiers. A memorial cross is located at the furthest point from the entrance, and features a downwards-pointing bronze sword on an octagonal base. The cemetery includes a tool store and a memorial shelter, in which visitors can leave messages that are later sent to the CWGC through the British Embassy in Rome.

== Burials ==
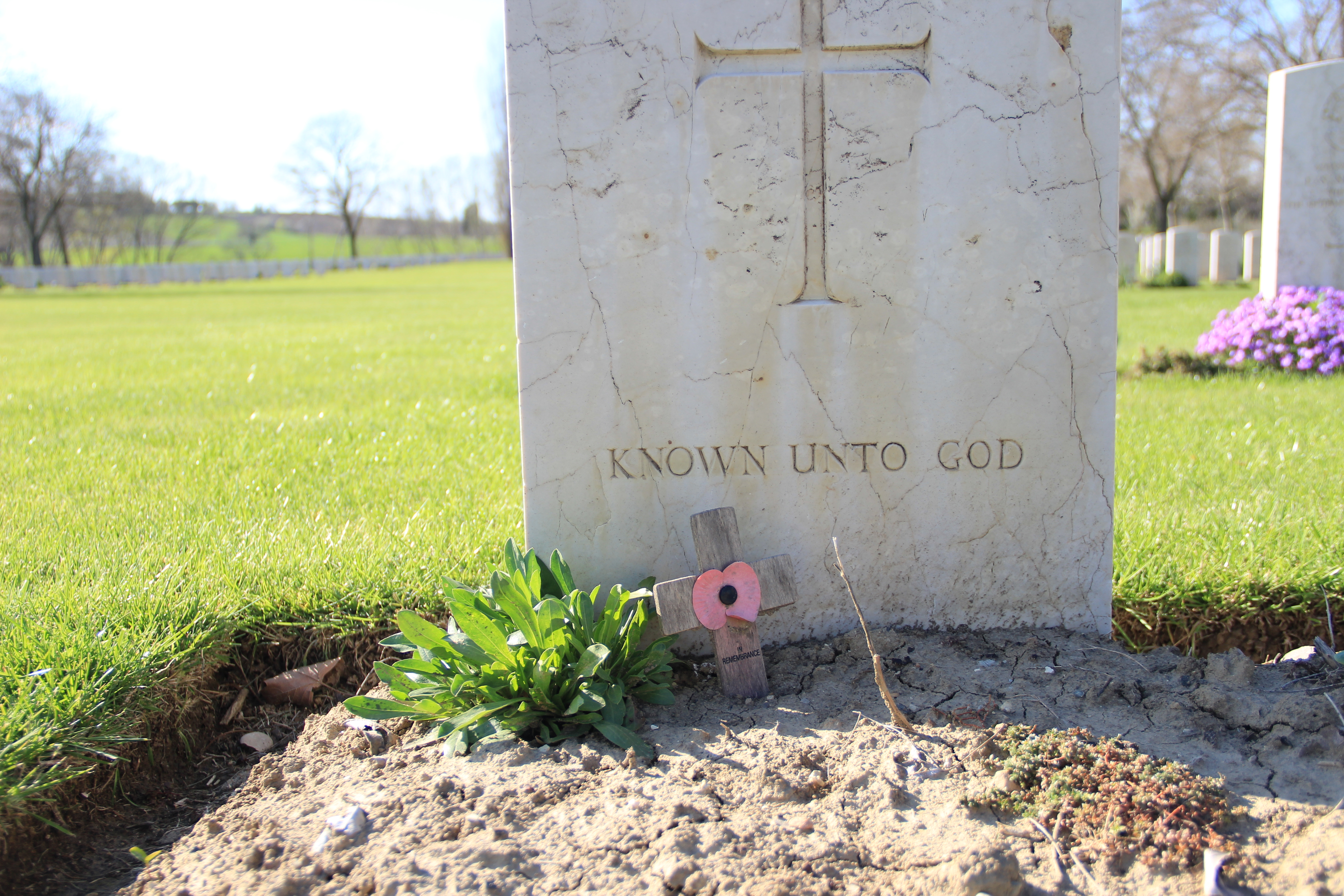
An unknown soldier's grave in the cemetery, April 2015

Coriano Ridge War Cemetery numbers 1,939 burials, of which 1,413 are British, 427 are Canadian, 52 are New Zealander, 28 are South African, 8 are Indian, 1 is Australian, 1 is Russian, 3 are of other nationalities, and 7 are unidentified. 50 graves are unidentified.

=== Notable burials ===
- Shane O'Neill, 3rd Baron O'Neill (1907–44), Anglo-Irish peer, Lieutenant-Colonel of the North Irish Horse, Royal Armoured Corps, who died on 24 October 1944
- John G. Watson (c. 1921–44), namesake of Watson Peak, British Columbia, Private of the Seaforth Highlanders of Canada, who died on 17 September 1944

== Access ==
The cemetery is always open, and served by Start Romagna SpA's route 20 bus between Rimini and Coriano. A gravel-and-stone car park outside the main entrance includes parking bays for coaches.
