= Kinuseo Falls =

Waterfall on the Murray River in Monkman Provincial Park, British Columbia, Canada

Coordinates: 54°47′03″N 121°11′29″W

Kinuseo Falls is a waterfall on the Murray River, which flows through the northern tip of Monkman Provincial Park in the Northern Rockies of British Columbia, Canada. The falls are located south of the community of Tumbler Ridge and northeast of the city of Prince George, though there is no road access from the Prince George side of the Rocky Mountains.

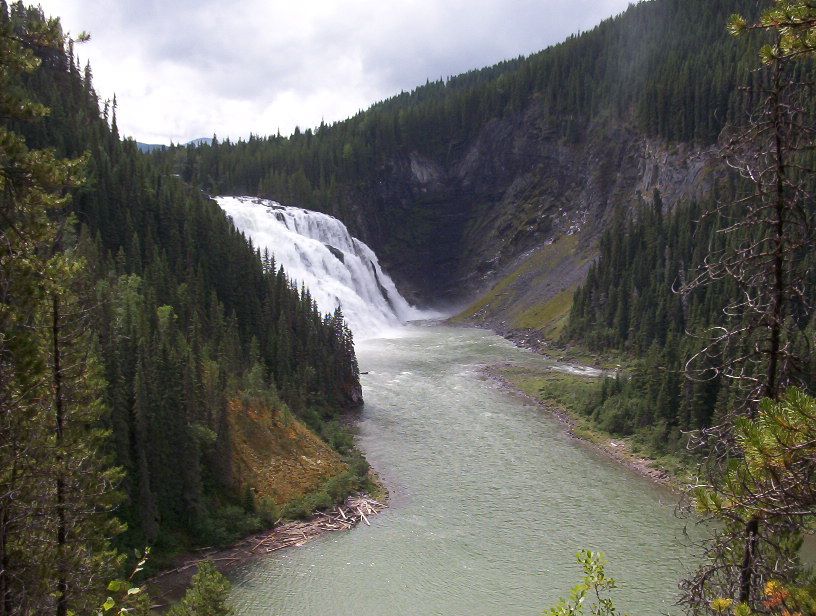
Kinuseo Falls: A geological fault in the course of the Murray River forms a 60-metre cascade.

One of the most outstanding features in Monkman Provincial Park, the falls measure 197 feet (60 metres), slightly taller than Niagara Falls, though it doesn't move the same volume of water as Niagara. The falls are located 3 km from the Kinuseo Falls Campground, also in Monkman Provincial Park. There is a trail from the campground to the falls, though many people choose to drive to the falls. The campground is also a departure point for people making further explorations into the park along the Monkman Pass Trail.

== Name origin ==
"...on our way down the east branch of the South Pine River (which flows north into the Peace, coming in below Hudson's Hope) we came to a large fall over 200 feet high. These we called Kinoosao Falls (meaning 'fish' in the Cree language) owing to the great numbers of trout both above and below the falls. We gave that name as it seemed most appropriate. We were unable to find anyone who had ever seen or heard of these falls, although some of the Indians had heard of them vaguely....." (February 1920 letter from S.Prescott Fay, Boston, to Geographic Board of Canada; BC file 34275-S#1, Ottawa file 0216).40658

== History ==
The first written reference to the falls is on the Robert W. Jones 1906 map compiled for the Grand Trunk Pacific Railway. The Fay expedition of 1914 took the first known photos. Samuel Prescott Fay, American explorer, proposed the name in 1915 and 1920, and was initially spelt on a map as "Kinoosao Falls". Prentiss Gray made the first moving picture in 1927 or 1928.

== See also ==
- Monkman Falls
- List of waterfalls
- List of waterfalls of Canada
- List of waterfalls in British Columbia
