= Pine Le Moray Provincial Park =

Provincial Park in British Columbia

- IUCN category II (national park)
- Location within British Columbia
- Interactive map of Pine Le Moray Provincial Park
- Location: British Columbia, Canada
- Nearest city: Mackenzie
- Coordinates: 55°23′N 122°30′W
- Area: 432 km^{2} (167 sq mi)
- Established: 2000
- Governing body: BC Parks

Pine Le Moray Provincial Park is a provincial park in British Columbia, Canada. The park, 70 km southwest of Chetwynd covers 43,289 hectares (106,970 acres). It is located within the Hart Ranges ecosection near the Rocky Mountains. It is within the Engelmann Spruce-Subalpine Fir biogeoclimatic zone. Water courses include Link and Mountain Creeks, the Pine River, and Heart Lake. It provides habitat for trout, Arctic grayling, mountain whitefish, high elevation caribou, moose, wolverine, and grizzly bear. It is recognized by the province as an area traditionally used by First Nations people. Its topography has examples of Karst topography and alpine areas.

It was created as Provincial Park in June 2000, with additional area added in 2001. The park can be used for fishing, canoeing, hunting, horseback riding, and wildlife viewing. Motorized vehicles (ATV, snowmobiles) are permitted on designated trails.
