= Mount Crysdale =

Mountain in the British Columbia Northern Rockies

- Location within British Columbia Location within Canada
- Interactive map of Mount Crysdale

Highest point
- Elevation: 2,427 m (7,963 ft)
- Prominence: 1,548 m (5,079 ft)
- Parent peak: Unnamed Peak
- Listing: Mountains of British Columbia; Ultras of Canada 123rd; Most Isolated Major Summits of Canada 39th
- Coordinates: 55°56′18″N 123°25′16″W

Geography
- Location: British Columbia, Canada
- District: Peace River Land District
- Parent range: Misinchinka Ranges
- Topo map: NTS 93O14 Point Creek

Mount Crysdale, is a 2,427-metre (7,963 ft) ultra-prominent, isolated peak in the Misinchinka Ranges, a subdivision range of the Hart Ranges, within the Northern Rocky Mountains.

Officially adopted on 2 September 1954, Mount Crysdale is named after C.R. Crysdale, Chief Engineer, Pacific Great Eastern Railway.
