= Parsnip River =

River in British Columbia, Canada

Location
- Country: Canada
- Province: British Columbia
- Regional District: Fraser Fort-George
- Land District: Cariboo Land District

Physical characteristics
- Source
  - location: Mount Vreeland
  - coordinates: 54°32′22″N 121°32′22″W
- Mouth
  - location: Williston Lake
  - coordinates: 55°10′26″N 123°04′20″W
- Length: 240 km (150 mi)
- Basin size: 559,659 ha

The Parsnip River is a 240-kilometre (150 mi) long river in central British Columbia, Canada. It flows generally north-westward from the Parsnip Glacier in the Hart Ranges to the Parsnip Reach of Williston Lake, formed by the impounding of the waters of the Peace River by the W.A.C. Bennett Dam in 1968. Prior to that, the Parsnip joined with the Finlay River to form the Peace at Finlay Forks, with both sharing an alignment along the Rocky Mountain Trench.

== Name origin ==
The river's name derives from the abundance of cow-parsnip (Heracleum lanatum), also known as Indian rhubarb, which grows along its banks.

== History ==
The Parsnip is of historical significance as forming part of the route Alexander MacKenzie took in his epic journey to the Pacific Ocean in 1793.

Fish populations and their protozoan and metazoan parasites in the headwater areas of the McGregor River (Pacific drainage) and of the Parsnip River (Arctic drainage) were the subject of studies carried out in the 1970s concerning the proposed diversion of waters across the continental divide. Three parasites (Ceratomyxa shasta, Cryptobia salmositica, and Haemogregarina irkalukpiki) were identified as posing the greatest threat to the fisheries resources of the immediate area and also to the downstream areas. Based in part on these studies, the British Columbia Hydro and Power Authority, in a public announcement, suspended engineering studies of the proposed diversion.

== Tributaries ==
- Hominka River
- Anzac River
- Table River
- Missinka River
- Crooked River
- Misinchinka River
  - Atunatche Creek

== See also ==
- List of rivers of British Columbia
