= Grant Peak (Murray Range) =

Mountain in British Columbia, Canada

- Location within British Columbia Location within Canada

Highest point
- Elevation: 2,094 m (6,870 ft)
- Prominence: 942 m (3,091 ft)
- Parent peak: Alexis W3
- Listing: Mountains of British Columbia
- Coordinates: 55°13′02″N 122°16′56″W

Geography
- Location: Pine Pass; British Columbia, Canada
- District: Peace River Land District
- Parent range: Murray Range
- Topo map: NTS 93O1 Mount Reynolds

Grant Peak is a 2,094-metre (6,870 ft) mountain in the Murray Range of the Hart Ranges in Northern British Columbia.

Grant Peak is named for Royal Canadian Naval Volunteer Reserve Ordinary Seaman George William Grant from Prince George, BC; serving with HMMTB 460 when he died, 2 July 1944. O/S Grant is buried at Haslar Royal Naval Cemetery, Hampshire.
