= Lake Saskatoon, Alberta =

Formerly populated place in Alberta, Canada

Coordinates: 55.236°N 119.116°W

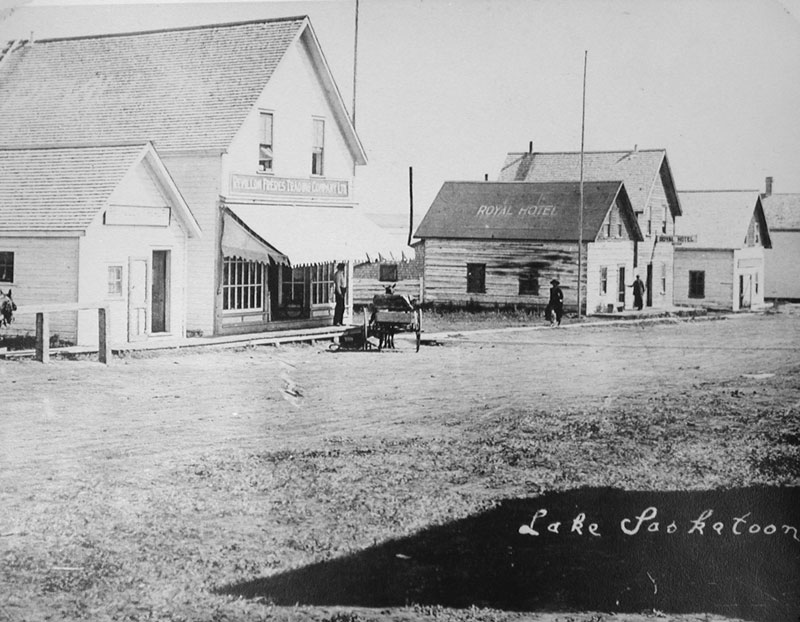
Lake Saskatoon circa 1914

Lake Saskatoon is a locality in northwest Alberta, Canada, within the county of Grande Prairie No. 1. It is approximately 18 km (11 mi) northwest of Grande Prairie.

The southwest shore of Lake Saskatoon was a natural meeting place as it had plenty of water, grass, an abundance of wild berries and sheltering poplars. In 1898, a trading post was established in the northwest corner of Lake Saskatoon.

The area chosen for the community was the south half of the northwest quarter of section 2, township 72, range 8, west of the sixth meridian. A subdivision was registered in September 1912. It was a 76-acre parcel of land laid out with five avenues intersecting five streets, with 260 lots. At one point, Lake Saskatoon had a number of businesses including a Bank of Commerce, a trading post, a flour mill, a blacksmith shop, a hardware store, a pool hall and a telegraph office. The population would have been over 100 residents. The post office was established in 1909 as Beaver Lodge Post Office but changed its name to Lake Saskatoon in 1912.

In 1924, when it became certain that the railway would not link the community, shops and offices were moved to a new site, namely Wembley. The community of Lake Saskatoon was abandoned. The post office officially closed in 1927.
