= Mount Reynolds (British Columbia) =

Mountain located in British Columbia

- Location within British Columbia Location within Canada

Highest point
- Elevation: 2,004 m (6,575 ft)
- Prominence: 583 m (1,913 ft)
- Parent peak: Grant Peak
- Listing: Mountains of British Columbia
- Coordinates: 55°11′18″N 122°21′38″W

Geography
- Location: Pine Pass; British Columbia, Canada
- District: Cariboo Land District
- Parent range: Murray Range
- Topo map: NTS 93O1 Mount Reynolds

Mount Reynolds, is a 2,004-metre (6,575 ft) mountain in the Murray Range of the Hart Ranges in Northern British Columbia.
