= Mackenzie, British Columbia =

Mackenzie
- District municipality
- District of Mackenzie
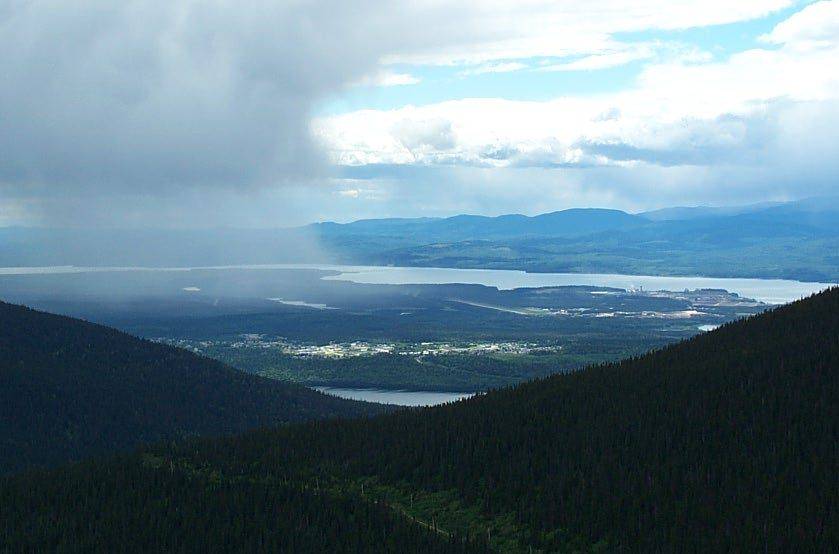
- Mackenzie seen from Morfee Mountain
- Nickname: "Mack-Town"
- Location of Mackenzie Mackenzie (Canada)
- Coordinates: 55°19′28″N 123°05′34″W
- Country: Canada
- Province: British Columbia
- Regional District: Fraser-Fort George
- Incorporated: 1966

Government
  - Mayor: Peter Kyllo
  - Governing body: District of Mackenzie Municipal Council
  - MP (Prince George-Peace River): Bob Zimmer
  - MLA (Prince George-Mackenzie): Kiel Giddens

Area
  - Total: 159.09 km^{2} (61.42 sq mi)
- Elevation: 700 m (2,300 ft)

Population (2016)
  - Total: 3,714
  - Density: 22.6/km^{2} (59/sq mi)
- Time zone: UTC−07:00 (PT)
- Postal code span: V0J 2C0
- Area code: 250 / 778 / 236
- Highways: Highway 39
- Website: districtofmackenzie.ca

Mackenzie is a district municipality within the Fraser-Fort George Regional District in central British Columbia, Canada. The community is located at the south end of Williston Lake. The townsite, established by Alexandra Forest Industries (acquired by BC Forest Products in 1967) and Cattermole Timber (partnered with Jujo Paper in 1970 to create Finlay Forest Industries), was named for Sir Alexander MacKenzie (1764–1820).

== Economy ==
Mackenzie's main industries are logging, lumber and tourism. Duz Cho Logging, sawmills were major employers in town. This includes the now closed Canfor Corporation Mackenzie sawmill (successor to BCFP's lumber division), the currently still running Conifex Timber (successor to FFI), and the Paper Excellence kraft pulp mill (successor to BCFP's pulp division). As of July 2019, the Canfor sawmill ceased production indefinitely as part of a province-wide curtailment of operations and in 2020 the pulp mill was also permanently shut down. The nearby Centerra Gold Mount Milligan copper-gold operation provides secondary economic activity for the town.

== Transportation ==
Mackenzie is located on Highway 39, 28 km (17 mi) from Highway 97. There is a scheduled bus service to Chetwynd and Prince George, although since Greyhound pulled out of Canada the new bus service is not very frequent. It is also served by a small airport. There is no scheduled passenger service but charter services are available.

== Demographics ==
In the 2021 Census of Population conducted by Statistics Canada, Mackenzie had a population of 3,281 living in 1,515 of its 1,837 total private dwellings, a change of −11.7% from its 2016 population of 3,714. With a land area of 154.19 km^{2} (59.53 sq mi), it had a population density of 21.3/km^{2} (55.1/sq mi) in 2021.

=== Religion ===
According to the 2021 census, religious groups in Mackenzie included:

- Irreligion (2,095 persons or 61.5%)
- Christianity (1,260 persons or 37.0%)
- Hinduism (20 persons or 0.6%)
- Other (25 persons or 0.7%)

Religious groups in the District of Mackenzie (1991−2021)
Religious group	2021		2011		2001		1991	
Religious group	Pop.	%	Pop.	%	Pop.	%	Pop.	%
Irreligious	2,095	61.53%	1,580	44.2%	1,810	34.57%	1,650	28.5%
Christian	1,260	37%	1,950	54.55%	3,045	58.17%	3,855	66.58%
Hindu	20	0.59%	25	0.7%	0	0%	15	0.26%
Sikh	0	0%	15	0.42%	365	6.97%	265	4.58%
Muslim	0	0%	0	0%	10	0.19%	0	0%
Buddhist	0	0%	0	0%	0	0%	0	0%
Jewish	0	0%	0	0%	0	0%	0	0%
Indigenous spirituality	0	0%	0	0%	N/A	N/A	N/A	N/A
Other religion	25	0.73%	0	0%	0	0%	0	0%
Total responses	3,405	103.78%	3,575	101.94%	5,235	100.56%	5,790	99.9%

=== Ethnicity ===
Panethnic groups in the District of Mackenzie (1986−2021)
Panethnic group	2021		2016		2011		2006		2001		1996		1991		1986	
Panethnic group	Pop.	%	Pop.	%	Pop.	%	Pop.	%	Pop.	%	Pop.	%	Pop.	%	Pop.	%
European (Note: Statistic includes all persons that did not make up part of a visible minority or an indigenous identity.)	2,840	83.28%	3,165	84.85%	3,010	84.08%	3,980	87.76%	4,590	87.6%	5,505	91.98%	5,010	86.53%	4,765	86.01%
Indigenous	405	11.88%	440	11.8%	440	12.29%	315	6.95%	210	4.01%	165	2.76%	360	6.22%	370	6.68%
Southeast Asian (Note: Statistic includes total responses of "Filipino" and "Southeast Asian" under visible minority section on census.)	80	2.35%	30	0.8%	15	0.42%	20	0.44%	10	0.19%	0	0%	10	0.17%	0	0%
South Asian	45	1.32%	70	1.88%	50	1.4%	175	3.86%	415	7.92%	265	4.43%	290	5.01%	355	6.41%
East Asian (Note: Statistic includes total responses of "Chinese", "Korean", and "Japanese" under visible minority section on census.)	10	0.29%	0	0%	0	0%	40	0.88%	15	0.29%	10	0.17%	40	0.69%	15	0.27%
African	10	0.29%	10	0.27%	10	0.28%	10	0.22%	0	0%	35	0.58%	45	0.78%	15	0.27%
Middle Eastern (Note: Statistic includes total responses of "West Asian" and "Arab" under visible minority section on census.)	0	0%	20	0.54%	0	0%	0	0%	0	0%	0	0%	25	0.43%	10	0.18%
Latin American	0	0%	0	0%	0	0%	0	0%	10	0.19%	10	0.17%	10	0.17%	10	0.18%
Other/multiracial (Note: Statistic includes total responses of "Visible minority, n.i.e." and "Multiple visible minorities" under visible minority section on census.)	0	0%	10	0.27%	0	0%	0	0%	0	0%	0	0%	—N/a	—N/a	—N/a	—N/a
Total responses	3,410	103.93%	3,730	100.43%	3,580	102.08%	4,535	99.91%	5,240	100.65%	5,985	99.8%	5,790	99.9%	5,540	99.96%
Total population	3,281	100%	3,714	100%	3,507	100%	4,539	100%	5,206	100%	5,997	100%	5,796	100%	5,542	100%
Note: Totals greater than 100% due to multiple origin responses.

== Climate ==
Mackenzie has a subarctic climate that has influences from the Pacific Ocean resulting in less cold winters than expected for its northerly latitude compared to other Canadian locations. It has warm summer days, but the cool nights ensure that only three months go above 10 °C (50 °F) in mean temperatures. Winters are very cold on occasion, although relatively short for a subarctic climate with a January mean of −9.2 °C (15.4 °F) as the coldest month.

Climate data for Mackenzie Airport
Month	Jan	Feb	Mar	Apr	May	Jun	Jul	Aug	Sep	Oct	Nov	Dec	Year
Record high humidex	9.2	9.9	14.9	23.8	31.4	31.9	36.0	35.5	32.3	23.7	12.4	8.4	36.0
Record high °C (°F)	9.8 (49.6)	11.1 (52.0)	16.3 (61.3)	24.4 (75.9)	34.6 (94.3)	31.9 (89.4)	35.0 (95.0)	35.0 (95.0)	30.7 (87.3)	23.0 (73.4)	13.3 (55.9)	8.3 (46.9)	35.0 (95.0)
Mean daily maximum °C (°F)	−5.6 (21.9)	−3.0 (26.6)	3.3 (37.9)	9.7 (49.5)	16.0 (60.8)	20.2 (68.4)	22.2 (72.0)	21.5 (70.7)	15.2 (59.4)	7.6 (45.7)	−1.2 (29.8)	−4.8 (23.4)	8.4 (47.1)
Daily mean °C (°F)	−9.2 (15.4)	−7.7 (18.1)	−2.7 (27.1)	3.3 (37.9)	8.9 (48.0)	13.3 (55.9)	15.2 (59.4)	14.3 (57.7)	9.1 (48.4)	3.3 (37.9)	−4.3 (24.3)	−8.2 (17.2)	2.9 (37.2)
Mean daily minimum °C (°F)	−12.9 (8.8)	−12.3 (9.9)	−8.5 (16.7)	−3.2 (26.2)	1.8 (35.2)	6.4 (43.5)	8.2 (46.8)	7.0 (44.6)	3.0 (37.4)	−1.1 (30.0)	−7.4 (18.7)	−11.6 (11.1)	−2.6 (27.3)
Record low °C (°F)	−44.5 (−48.1)	−43.8 (−46.8)	−40.0 (−40.0)	−25.6 (−14.1)	−8.9 (16.0)	−4.0 (24.8)	−1.0 (30.2)	−4.3 (24.3)	−8.9 (16.0)	−21.5 (−6.7)	−35.6 (−32.1)	−45.1 (−49.2)	−45.1 (−49.2)
Record low wind chill	−52.8	−43.1	−42.8	−24.4	−14.7	−3.2	0.0	−4.8	−10.8	−29.5	−48.0	−50.4	−52.8
Average precipitation mm (inches)	70.5 (2.78)	45.6 (1.80)	32.6 (1.28)	30.6 (1.20)	48.0 (1.89)	56.9 (2.24)	61.8 (2.43)	49.0 (1.93)	52.4 (2.06)	71.8 (2.83)	71.6 (2.82)	60.9 (2.40)	651.7 (25.66)
Average rainfall mm (inches)	2.5 (0.10)	5.6 (0.22)	8.0 (0.31)	16.1 (0.63)	47.0 (1.85)	56.9 (2.24)	61.8 (2.43)	49.0 (1.93)	51.9 (2.04)	57.1 (2.25)	10.3 (0.41)	4.0 (0.16)	370.2 (14.57)
Average snowfall cm (inches)	77.9 (30.7)	47.3 (18.6)	27.4 (10.8)	15.3 (6.0)	1.0 (0.4)	0.0 (0.0)	0.0 (0.0)	0.0 (0.0)	0.6 (0.2)	15.2 (6.0)	63.5 (25.0)	64.0 (25.2)	312.3 (123.0)
Average precipitation days (≥ 0.2 mm)	16.7	13.0	11.5	10.1	13.1	13.5	13.4	11.8	12.2	16.3	16.7	16.3	164.8
Average rainy days (≥ 0.2 mm)	1.4	2.7	3.1	7.4	12.8	13.9	13.3	12.4	11.2	13.8	4.7	1.9	98.4
Average snowy days (≥ 0.2 cm)	17.0	12.6	9.4	4.9	0.8	0.0	0.0	0.0	0.6	5.2	15.6	16.2	82.4
Average relative humidity (%)	78.3	69.7	56.6	45.6	40.7	43.7	46.0	47.3	54.6	66.7	80.3	82.0	59.3
Mean monthly sunshine hours	35.4	67.4	151.0	201.3	239.7	249.0	273.5	254.2	163.8	93.4	35.4	28.5	1,792.7
Percentage possible sunshine	14.6	24.9	41.2	47.6	47.8	47.9	52.5	54.7	42.7	28.7	14.0	12.7	35.8

== Recreation ==
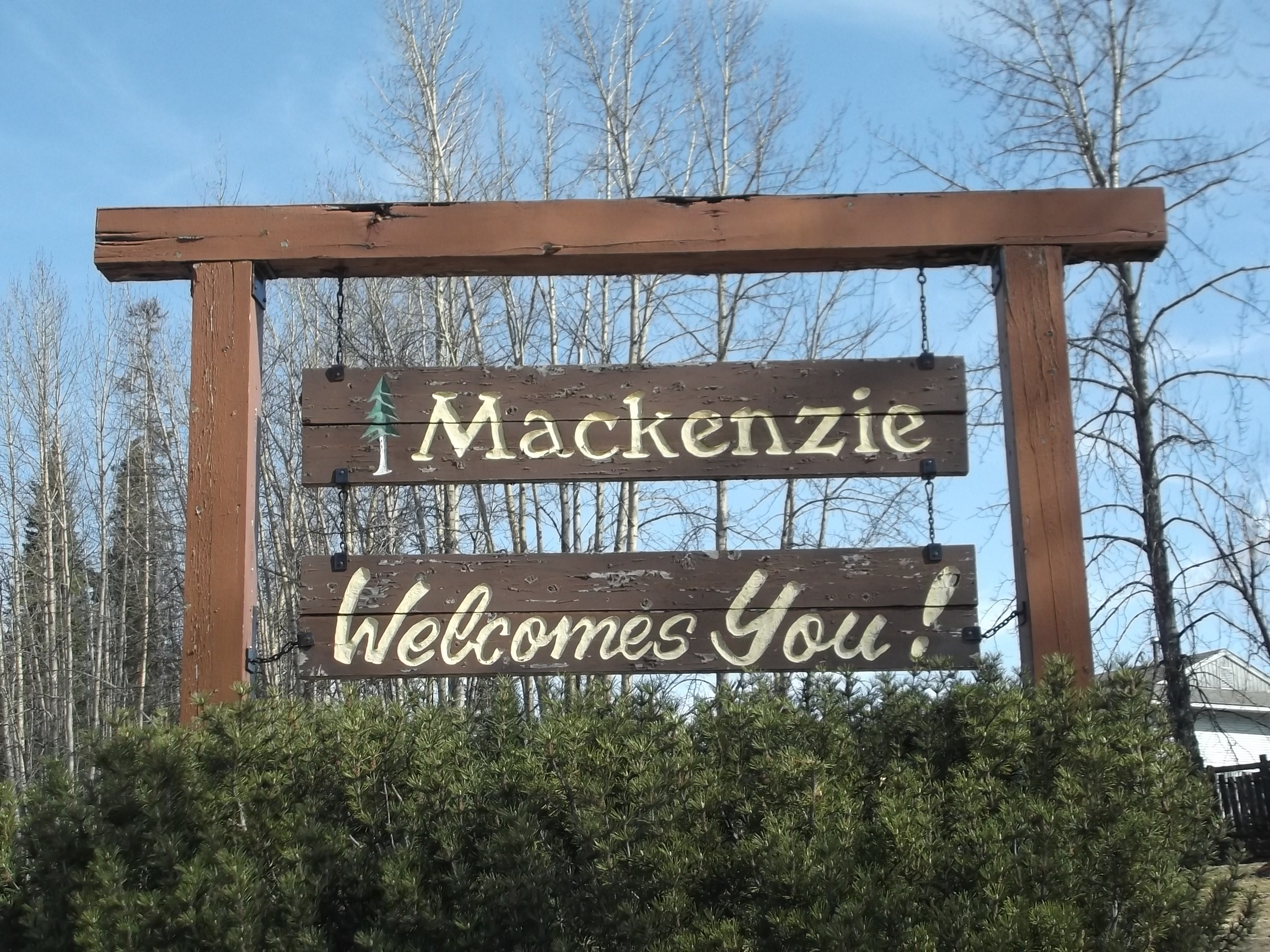
Mackenzie's welcome sign

In the winter, Mackenzie hosts dog sled racing, cross-country skiing, and snowmobiling competitions, and maintains 32 km of groomed cross-country ski trails. Morfee Mountain overlooks Mackenzie and is suitable for hiking and off-road vehicle usage. Mackenzie has a swimming pool, indoor skating rink, a curling rink, and two beaches on Morfee Lake; First Beach is used primarily for recreational swimming, and Second Beach includes a boat launch. Mackenzie is home to Little Mac Ski Hill, a small local ski hill and mountain-bike park located east of town and a 45-minutes drive from Powder King ski resort. The nearby lakes and forests are suitable for fishing and hunting.

Mackenzie Golf and Country Club is a semi-private, nine-hole golf course with a driving range. It is situated within walking distance of most of the town.

== Community facilities ==
Community facilities include a recreation centre that houses the public library, gym, swimming pool, ice rink, and community hall. There is also an art centre, a museum, two shopping malls, and two schools: Mackenzie Secondary School (which also serves McLeod Lake), and Morfee Elementary School. The schools are operated by the Prince George School District (No. 57).

Mackenzie also has several religious establishments, including a Sikh temple, St. Peter's Catholic, Mackenzie Baptist and Hope Trinity (converging the Anglican, Lutheran and United faiths) churches and Living Joy Christian Centre.

Mackenzie has been served by CHMM-FM, a not-for-profit radio station since 2003.

Mackenzie has its own Royal Canadian Mounted Police detachment, a provincial courtroom, a volunteer fire department, and a municipal hospital.

== Tourist attractions ==
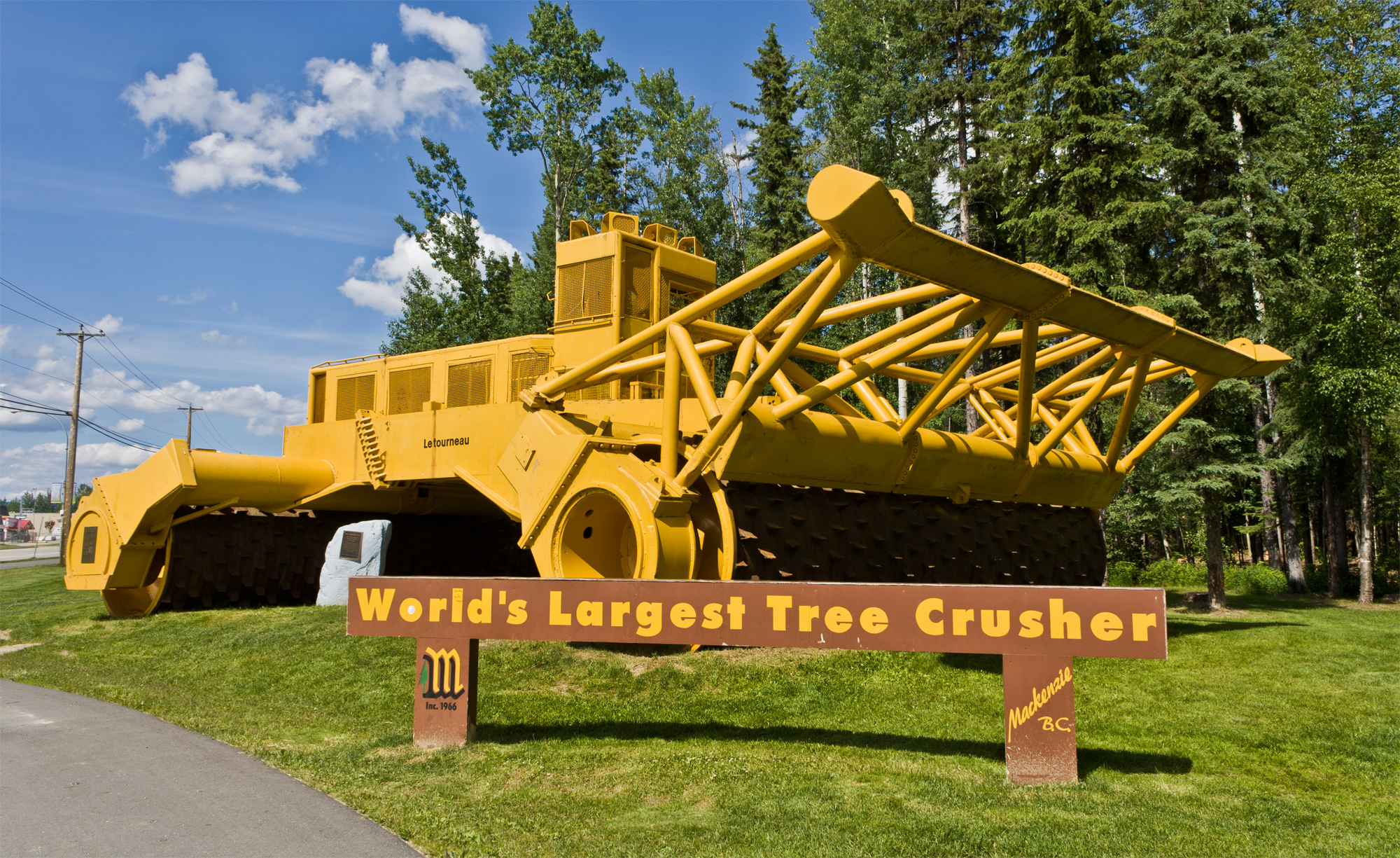
World largest tree crusher

Mackenzie is situated less than 10 km (6.2 mi) east of Williston Lake reservoir, the largest man-made lake in British Columbia. Mackenzie is also the home of the world's largest tree crusher.

== Notable people ==
- Turner Stevenson – Former National Hockey League player
- Leah Callahan – Canadian Olympic wrestler (London 2012)

== See also ==
- List of francophone communities in British Columbia
