= Monkman Provincial Park =

Provincial park in British Columbia, Canada

- IUCN category II (national park)
- Location within British Columbia
- Interactive map of Monkman Provincial Park
- Coordinates: 54°36′00″N 121°11′00″W
- Area: 62,867 ha (242.73 sq mi)
- Established: July 30, 1981
- Governing body: BC Parks

Monkman Provincial Park is a provincial park in British Columbia, southwest of Tumbler Ridge and northeast of Hansard. Like Monkman Pass, Monkman Lake, Monkman Creek and Monkman Falls, it was named after Alexander Monkman.

== History ==
By the early 1960s, a strong local interest emerged to create a national park, with a proposed name of Canada Centennial Park. Covering approximately a 100-mile long and 30-mile wide section of the Monkman area, a 1970 report proposed a freeze on further land leases for resources extraction, and the formation of a wilderness park. The Regional District of Fraser-Fort George opposed the plan because of its impact on resource development. In due course, the government banned all off-road vehicular access to prevent ground cover damage. Established in 1981, the park covers 62,867 hectares.

The washed out logging road, formerly accessible only by all-terrain vehicles and four-wheel-drive trucks with winches, was upgraded during 1991 to a gravel road suitable for regular vehicles. The grand opening occurred the following August, with a new 42-unit campground. The 75-passenger BC Rail Prince George-Tumbler Ridge-Chetwynd circle tour for the ceremony sold out within days. A further 22,000 hectares were added to the park in 1999 to protect the Limestone Lakes and Upper Fontiniko Creek Valley areas.

== Features ==
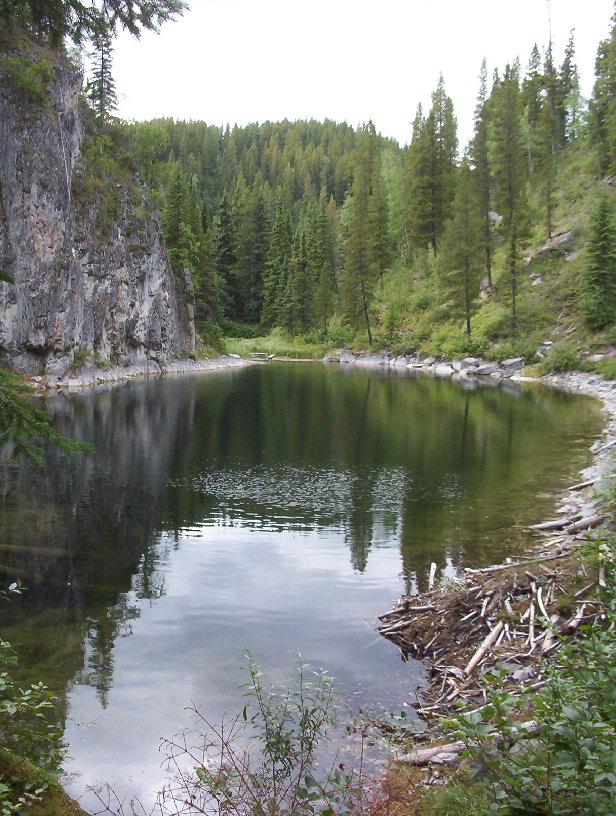
The Stone Corral

=== Monkman Pass ===
The discovery is unclear, and railway officials and legislators ignored the pass’s value, but the combined efforts of hundreds of volunteers attempted to conquer it with a highway. Only a few sections of the former road/packhorse trail are visible along the Monkman Lake Trail and Monkman Pass Memorial Trail. For the history of the wider Monkman Pass area see:

=== Kinuseo Falls ===
Located 2 km. north of the campground at the northern tip of the park, the 60-metre (197-foot) waterfall is slightly taller than Niagara Falls, but with a fraction of the water.

=== The Green Bowl ===
The gorge is southeast of Kinuseo Falls and immediately south of the entrance road on the Stone Corral Interpretive Hiking Trail.

=== The Stone Corral ===
Identified in 1999, it comprises a crystal-clear doline surrounded by 100-metre vertical limestone cliffs. Immediately south of the Green Bowl, the four-kilometre interpretive trail also includes ponds, falls and caves that contain stalactites, moonsmilk and other limestone formations.

=== Monkman Lake Trail ===
The trail follows the east bank of the Murray River for seven kilometres before crossing a suspension bridge. About 10 km. farther are branches to the Cascades.

=== The Cascades ===
The Cascades are a series of 10 waterfalls along Monkman Creek including Lower Moore Falls, Upper Falls, Brooks Falls, Shire Falls, Monkman Falls, McGinnis Falls and Chambers Falls. Located about 4 km. before Monkman Lake, and 1 km. west of the Memorial Trail, four bear names of original highway trailblazers: Brooks, Moore, Monkman and McGinnis.

=== Monkman Lake ===
Located near the centre of the northern half of the park, the original 25-km. trail ended at the serene lake. Surrounded by precipitous mountains, it is the largest body of water in the park.

=== Monkman Pass Memorial Trail ===
Officially opened July 17, 2008, the route is an extension of the Monkman Lake Trail. The 63-km. hike takes five to six days to complete, and follows part of the former road/trail. South of Monkman Lake, the trail deviates from the original route into subalpine meadows with a series of tarns. Descending the western slopes, the terminus is Hobi’s Cabin, at the confluence of Fontiniko and Herrick Creeks, a destination accessible only by boat.
