= Northern Rocky Mountains =

Northern half of the Canadian portion of the Rocky Mountains

- Northern Rockies
- Location within British Columbia

Highest point
- Peak: Mount Ulysses (depending on source)
- Elevation: 3,024 m (9,921 ft)
- Coordinates: 57°20′47″N 124°5′34″W

Geography
- Location: British Columbia, Canada
- Parent range: Canadian Rockies

The Northern Rocky Mountains, usually referred to as the Northern Rockies, are a subdivision of the Canadian Rockies comprising the northern half of the Canadian segment of the Rocky Mountains. While their northward limit is easily defined as the Liard River, which is the northward terminus of the whole Rockies, the southward limit is debatable, although the area of Mount Ovington and Monkman Pass is mentioned in some sources, as south from there are the Continental Ranges, which are the main spine of the Rockies forming the boundary between British Columbia and Alberta. Some use the term to mean only the area north of the Peace Arm of the Williston Reservoir, and in reference to Northern Rocky Mountains Provincial Park, while others consider the term to extend all the way south, beyond the limit of the Hart Ranges at Mount Ovington, to include the McBride area, the Sir Alexander Group and Mount Robson.

The area south of the Williston Reservoir, the Hart Ranges, is much more accessible and better known, while north of Lake Williston the Northern Rockies are extremely remote and rarely visited or photographed. The Hart Ranges are traversed by B.C. Highway 97 (the John Hart Highway) and the Peace River extension of the former BC Rail line (now part of Canadian National Railways), which use the Pine Pass, and also by the Tumbler Ridge spur line to the Sukunka River coalmines. The Alaska Highway traverses the northernmost part of the range via Stone Mountain and Muncho Lake Provincial Parks.

== Subranges ==
- Muskwa Ranges (north of Williston Reservoir)
- Hart Ranges (south of Williston Reservoir)
  - Misinchinka Ranges (From the Peace Arm of Williston Reservoir, south to the Monkman Pass)
  - Murray Range
  - Pioneer Range
  - Solitude Range

== Provincial parks ==
In addition to Northern Rocky Mountains Provincial Park, other parks in the Northern Rockies are:

- North of Williston Reservoir:
  - Muncho Lake Provincial Park
  - Stone Mountain Provincial Park
  - Kwadacha Wilderness Provincial Park
- South of Williston Reservoir,:
  - Monkman Provincial Park
  - Kakwa Provincial Park and Protected Area (Depending on source)
  - Close To The Edge Provincial Park and Protected Area
  - Wapiti Lake Provincial Park
  - Bijoux Falls Provincial Park
  - Mount Robson Provincial Park
