= Cariboo Land District =

Cadastral survey subdivision of British Columbia, Canada

Coordinates: 53°30′00″N 122°00′00″W

Cariboo Land District is a cadastral survey subdivision of the province of British Columbia, Canada, created with rest of those on Mainland British Columbia via the Lands Act of the Colony of British Columbia in 1860. The British Columbia government's BC Names system, a subdivision of GeoBC, defines a land district as "a territorial division with legally defined boundaries for administrative purposes" All land titles and surveys use the Land District system as the primary point of reference, and entries in BC Names for placenames and geographical objects are so listed.

== Description ==
Cariboo Land District is one of the original Land Districts of the province, its northern portion having been split off as the Peace River Land District, which is to its north. To is south is Lillooet Land District and a small northerly extension of Kamloops Subdivision Yale Land District. On its west are Ranges 3, 4 and 5 of Coast Land District and part of the southeastern flank of Cassiar Land District.

The northern apex of its boundary is where the 124th meridian west meets 57 degrees 8 minutes latitude north, thence via the summit-line of the Rocky Mountains southeast to 52 degrees 22 minutes north latitude at 118 degrees 12 minutes west longitude. From there the boundary traverses the Rocky Mountain Trench via an irregular line to the summit line of the Monashee Mountains at 52 degrees 10 minutes north latitude at 118 degrees 48 minutes west longitude, following that north to the pass at the head of the North Thompson River across to the summit line of the Cariboo Mountains, following that to 52 degrees 52 minutes north latitude 120 degrees 13 minutes west longitude, which is at the converge of the range's main summit-line with the basins of the Quesnel and Clearwater River, then south along the summit-line of the boundaries of those two river-basins to 51 degrees 59 minutes north latitude at 120 degrees 13 minutes west longitude. From there the boundary with Lillooet Land District runs generally west, save for a few deviations around private property lines, to 52 degrees north latitude, 124 degrees west longitude at which point the boundary runs north to its apex on the ridgeline of the Rockies.

== See also ==
- Cariboo
- Cariboo (disambiguation)
- List of Land Districts of British Columbia
