= Hart Ranges =

Subrange of the Northern Canadian Rockies in British Columbia, Canada

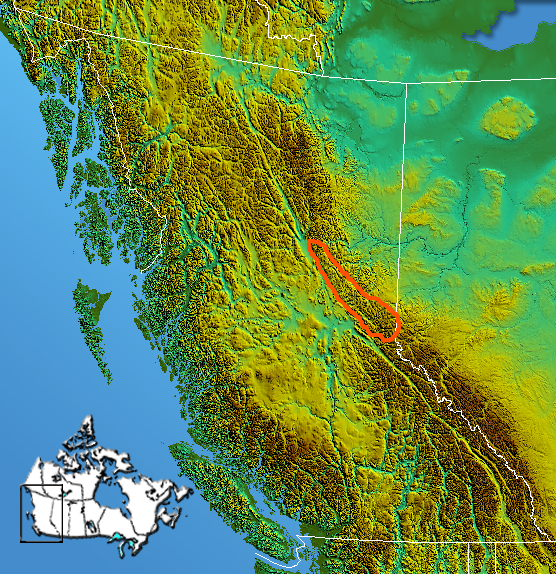
- Location of the Hart Ranges

Highest point
- Peak: Mount Ovington
- Elevation: 2,941 m (9,649 ft)
- Listing: Ranges of the Canadian Rockies
- Coordinates: 54°08′40″N 120°34′15″W

Dimensions
- Length: 282 km (175 mi) NW-SE
- Width: 367 km (228 mi)
- Area: 13,584 km^{2} (5,245 mi^{2})

Geography
- Country: Canada
- Provinces: British Columbia and Alberta
- Range coordinates: 55°0′N 122°30′W
- Parent range: Canadian Rockies
- Borders on: Muskwa Ranges (north); Continental Ranges (south)
- Topo map: NTS 93O1 Mount Reynolds

The Hart Ranges are a major subrange of the Canadian Rockies located in northeastern British Columbia and western Alberta. The mountains constitute the southernmost portion of the Northern Rocky Mountains.

The Hart Ranges were named in honour of British Columbia Premier John Hart, as is the highway which traverses the Pine Pass in the northern part of the range, connecting the north-central Interior of the province to the Peace River Regional District to the northeast.

== Geography ==
The boundaries of the Hart Ranges are the Rocky Mountain Trench and the McGregor Plateau on the west/southwest, the Peace Reach of Williston Lake on the north, a certain line of demarcation with the Rocky Mountain Foothills to the east/northeast, and the Jarvis Creek to the south.

The Hart Ranges is home to two ultra-prominent peaks, Mount Crysdale and Mount Ovington. Mount Ida and Mount Sir Alexander are south of Jarvis Creek and are in the Continental Ranges, which comprise the main and best-known part of the Rocky Mountains and run all the way south to Marias Pass in Montana.

Sub-ranges

Official subdivisions of the Hart Ranges include the:

- Misinchinka Range (from the Peace Arm of the Williston Reservoir to Monkman Pass)
  - Murray Range
  - Pioneer Range
  - Solitude Range

Other areas of the Hart Ranges have no subdesignations though the area around Mount Sir Alexander has been dubbed the Mount Sir Alexander Group by The Canadian Mountain Encyclopedia; however, this is not an official designation.

== Industry ==
The Hart Ranges are the location of a number of large coal mines focused on the remote communities of Tumbler Ridge and Chetwynd.

== Preservation ==
The southernmost tip of the mountain range is preserved within Kakwa Provincial Park and Protected Area. Other provincial parks located within the range include Monkman Provincial Park and Hole-in-the-Wall Provincial Park.
