= Malin =

Malin may refer to:

== Places ==
- Malin, Homalin, a village in Sagaing Region, Burma
- Rivière du Malin (Malin River), Quebec, Canada
- Malin, Xinning (Chinese: 麻林瑶族乡), a Yao ethnic township of Xinning County, Hunan, China
- Malin Head, the northernmost point of Ireland
- Malin, County Donegal, Ireland, the village that gives its name to Malin Head
- Malin Sea, north of Ireland
- Malin, Poland, a village in Lower Silesia
- Malin, a village in Nușeni Commune, Bistriţa-Năsăud County, Romania
- Malyn, sometimes spelled Malin, a city in Zhytomyr Oblast of Ukraine
- Malyn (Malin), a village in Mlyniv Raion in Rivne Oblast of Ukraine
- Malin, Oregon, United States, a city
  - Malin Airport
- Malin Valley, Victoria Land, Antarctica
- Malin 1, a galaxy
- 4766 (1987 FF1) Malin, an asteroid - see List of minor planets: 4001–5000

== People ==
- Malin (given name), a feminine Swedish given name
- Malin (surname), a surname
- Malin people, an ethnic group in Burma

== Fictional and mythical characters ==
- Malin (The King of Fighters), a character from The King of Fighters fighting game series
- Malin, the brother of Mempricius in Welsh legend
- the title character of Malin Kundang, an Indonesian folk tale, and Malin Kundang (film), which is loosely based on the folk tale

== Other uses ==
- French ship Le Malin, four ships of the French Navy
- Malin GAA a Gaelic games club based in Malin, Ireland
- Malin Space Science Systems, San Diego, California company that designs uncrewed spacecraft

== See also ==
- Malins (disambiguation)
