= Jordan Cove Energy Project =

Proposed liquefied natural gas terminal in Oregon

Coordinates: 43.425°N 124.269°W

Jordan Cove lies within Coos Bay, Oregon

The Jordan Cove Energy Project was a proposal by Calgary-based energy company Pembina to build a liquefied natural gas export terminal within the International Port of Coos Bay, Oregon. The natural gas would have been transported to the terminal by the Pacific Connector Gas Pipeline. The proposal has been met with objections from landowners, Tribes, and commercial entities since 2010 and was cancelled in late 2021.

== Facility ==
The site proposed for the Jordan Cove Energy Project is located on property controlled by the International Port of Coos Bay, which is zoned for industrial development. The facility would consist of two full containment storage tanks, each with a capacity of 160,000 cubic metres (5,650,347 cu ft). It would have a single marine berth for loading liquefied natural gas and a dedicated tractor tug dock. The facility would be located on the north shore of Coos Bay, approximately seven nautical miles from the channel that connects the bay to the Pacific Ocean, and about 2 kilometres (1.2 mi) northwest of North Bend Municipal Airport. The facility is being designed to accommodate about two vessels per week. Each ship will take less than 24 hours to load its cargo. The cost of development at the site is set at $6 billion.

The terminal would employ about 60 people, and construction of the terminal and pipeline would employ about 450 people over more than three years

== Pipeline ==
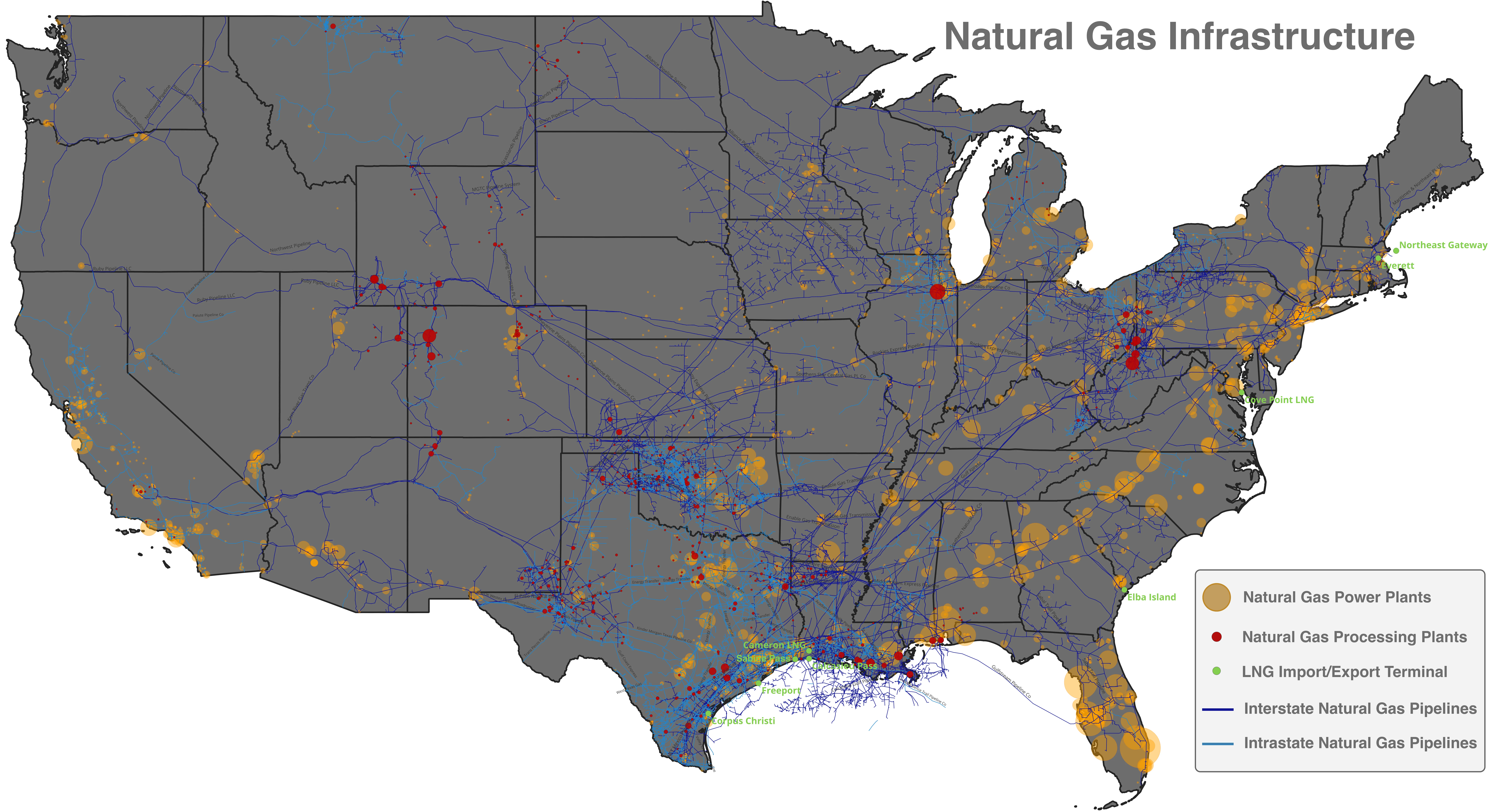
Natural gas infrastructure in the United States

Natural gas would be transported to the Jordan Cove liquefaction terminal by the 234-mile (377 km) long Pacific Connector Gas Pipeline. The buried, 36-inch-diameter (910 mm) natural gas pipeline would take a diagonal course, heading from Coos Bay southeast to Malin, Oregon. The proposal includes four natural gas meter stations, at Jordan Cove; at milepoint 69.7 in Douglas County; at Shady Cove in Jackson County; and at milepoint 230.9 in Klamath County. The pipeline would terminate at the border between Oregon and California, where it would connect with existing pipeline belonging to Gas Transmission Northwest, Tuscarora Gas, and Pacific Gas and Electric Company, at the proposed Buck Butte, Russell Canyon, and Tule Lake meter stations. The pipeline would cross the Coast Range between Coos Bay and Roseburg, with its central point near Shady Cove, Oregon. The pipeline route crosses five major rivers: the Coos, Coquille, Rogue, South Umpqua, and Klamath rivers and would cross land owned by the state, the federal government, and private individuals. About 675 private landowners, would be compensated by the pipeline company for the use of their land, with prices set either through negotiation or via the legal process of eminent domain seizure. The cost to construct the pipeline was estimated at $1.5 billion.

== Power plant ==
The first 2009 application included the South Dunes Power Plant, which was a proposed combined cycle natural gas fueled power plant, built to provide power to the liquefaction facility. Located close to US 101 at the East edge of the site, it would have a peaking capacity of 420 MW. Permitting of the facility falls under the authority of the Oregon Energy Facility Siting Council.

The later 2013 application removed the separate power plant, in favor of direct gas turbine driven refrigeration compressors. The facility was to be independent of outside power, with an on-site power plant using a steam turbine fed by a combination Heat Recovery Steam Generators (HRSG), recovering heat from the gas turbines, and a natural gas fired boiler.

== History ==
According to PBS Newshour the original intent was for the facility to be used to import natural gas into the US, prior to the development of the exploitation of petroleum resources through "fracking". In December 2007, the Jordan Cove Energy Project and the Pacific Connector Gas Pipeline applied for approval from the Federal Energy Regulatory Commission (FERC). An environmental impact statement for both projects was issued in May 2009. The original developers of the Jordan Cove project are Energy Projects Development Limited. The current lead investor in the Jordan Cove terminal is Veresen, an energy infrastructure company based in Calgary, Alberta. The investors in the pipeline are Williams and Veresen. FERC approved the project in December 2009. In April 2012, FERC vacated the approval upon notification that the owners would no longer be pursuing an import facility. In May 2013, Jordan Cove filed applications with FERC to construct and operate a liquefied natural gas export facility. In June 2015, the Confederated Tribes of Coos, Lower Umpqua and Siuslaw Indians, the local Native American tribe, brought their grave concerns before the Jordan Cove Board stating the project directly impacts cultural, historical and archeological resources located throughout Jordan Cove. In July the tribe echoed their concerns in a letter to the Federal Energy Regulatory Committee.

FERC denied the project a permit on March 11, 2016. The reason given was that Veresen had not demonstrated the need for the project, and that the benefits from the project would not outweigh the harm done to individual landowners to justify the use of eminent domain. On March 25, Veresen announced that they had found a potential buyer for the gas that would be exported, which was a consortium of Japanese utilities, but no contracts were signed. They suggested they appeal the decision by FERC and lost that appeal in December 2016. The project was cancelled in late 2021.

In 2025, a new startup, OA Partners LLC, has filed an appeal with the US Court of Appeals for the District of Columbia to attempt to reverse the 2016 FERC rejection of the project.

== Law Enforcement Response and Surveillance ==
In 2019, it was revealed by The Guardian that opponents of Jordan Cove Energy Project were being monitored by the FBI and other government agencies. A subsequent investigation by The Intercept and Type Investigations, based on more than 15,000 pages of documents obtained via open records requests, found that Pembina Pipeline was the sole source of funding for a unit in the Coos County sheriff department dedicated to handling security concerns related to Jordan Cove. This included purchasing riot control equipment, monitoring the activities of Jordan Cove opponents, and coordinating intelligence-gathering operations with private security companies working for Pembina. They also funded a two-day training in November 2018, organized by the National Sheriffs’ Association.

Despite no evidence of committing crimes, these investigations documented how the environmental and Indigenous groups opposing the pipeline were surveilled by the Oregon TITAN Fusion Center under the pretext of "counterterrorism." In 2021, individuals surveilled by the Fusion Center filed a lawsuit, alleging that the monitoring of activists was illegal.

== Reactions ==
The Jordan Cove LNG project has been long opposed by impacted communities, including landowners, Tribes, commercial fishermen, and more across Southern Oregon for over a decade. In 2018, a poll found 57 percent either strongly opposed or leaned toward opposing the Jordan Cove Energy Project, versus 22 percent who either leaned toward supporting or strongly supported the project. US Senator Jeff Merkley and US Representative Peter Defazio publicly opposed this project.

Facing widespread opposition and lacking a number of key permits necessary for construction, the project stalled out in 2020. In 2022, Pembina announced that the pipeline and export terminal would not be built, and the project was permanently canceled.

== See also ==
- Alaska LNG
