= Malin (given name) =

Malin is a Swedish form of the feminine given name Magdalene. Notable people with the name include:

- Malin Ahlberg (born 1991), Swedish footballer
- Malin Akerman (born 1978), Swedish actress
- Malin Alegria, American author of Youth literature
- Malin Allberg (born 1975), Swedish footballer
- Malin Altherr (born 2003), Swiss handball player
- Malin Andersson (born 1973), Swedish footballer
- Malin Atanasov (born 1946), Bulgarian ice hockey player
- Malin Aune (born 1995), Norwegian handball player
- Malin Baryard-Johnsson (born 1975), Swedish equestrian
- Malin Sofia Katarina Berggren, the birthname of Linn Berggren (born 1970), Swedish singer-songwriter
- Malin Berghagen (born 1966), Swedish actress
- Malin Bergström (born 1965), Child psychologist
- Malin Birgerson (born 1968), Swedish actress
- Malin Björk (born 1972), Swedish politician
- Malin Björk (Centre Party politician) (born 1969), Swedish politician
- Malin Brenn (born 1999), Norwegian footballer
- Malin Broman (born 1975), Swedish violinist
- Malin Burnham (born 1927), American philanthropist and sailor
- Malin Buska (born 1984), Swedish actress
- Malin Byström (born 1973), Swedish opera singer
- Malin Craig (1875–1945), 13th Chief of Staff of the United States Army
- Malin Crépin (born 1978), Swedish actress
- Malin Dahlström (born 1989), Swedish pole vaulter
- Malin Danielsson (born 1978), Swedish politician
- Malin Diaz (born 1994), Swedish football midfielder
- Malin Ek (born 1945), Swedish stage and film actress
- Malin Ewerlöf-Krepp (born 1972), Swedish middle-distance runner
- Malin Falch (born 1993), Norwegian comics reator
- Malin Falkenmark (1925–2023), Swedish hydrologist
- Malín Falú (born 1946), Puerto Rican journalist and model
- Malin Flink (born 1974), Swedish footballer
- Malin Gerdin (born 1993), Swedish synchronized swimmer
- Malin Persson Giolito (born 1969), Swedish author and lawyer
- Malin Gjörup (1964–2020), Swedish actress
- Malin Gramer (born 1978), Swedish actress and television presenter
- Malin Gustafsson (born 1980), Swedish footballer and ice hockey player
- Malin Gut (born 2000), Swiss footballer
- Malin Hållberg-Leuf (born 1979), Swedish figure skater
- Malin Hansen-Hotopp (born 1977), German equestrian
- Malin Hartelius (born 1966), Swedish soprano
- Malin Höglund (born 1969), Swedish politician
- Malin Holst, German bioarchaeologist
- Malin Holta (born 1993), Norwegian handball player
- Malin Källström (born 1969), Swedish sailor
- Malin Krastev (born 1970), actor
- Malin Lagerlöf (born 1968), Swedish screenwriter and playwright
- Malin Larsson (born 1980), Swedish politician
- Malin Levanon (born 1977), Swedish actress
- Malin Levenstad (born 1988), Swedish football coach and former player
- Malin Lundgren (born 1967), Swedish footballer
- Malin Matsdotter (1613–1676), Alleged Swedish witch
- Malin Millbourn (born 1971), Swedish sailor
- Malin Moström (born 1975), Swedish footballer
- Dinah Nah (born 1980), Musical artist
- Malin Nilsson (born 1973), Swedish swimmer
- Malin Nykvist (born 1979), Swedish footballer
- Malin Olsson (born 1982), Swedish singer, model and television presenter
- Malin Orachev (born 1972), Bulgarian footballer
- Malin Östh (born 1972), Swedish politician
- Malin Pereira (born 1961), American literary scholar
- Malin Persson (born 1979), Swedish model and costume maker
- Malin Petersen (born 1981), Swedish equestrian
- Malin Reitan (born 1995), Norwegian singer
- Malin Reuterwall (born 1990), Swedish footballer
- Malin Rundgren (born 1965), Swedish swimmer
- Malin Sandberg (born 2000), Swedish handball player
- Malin Strömberg (born 1976), Swedish swimmer
- Malin Svahnström (born 1980), Swedish swimmer
- Malin Swedberg (born 1968), Swedish footballer
- Malin Ulvefeldt (born 1994), Swedish tennis player
- Malin Wästlund (born 1964), Swedish long-distance runner
- Malin Westerheim (born 1993), Norwegian sports shooter
- Malin Wilson (born 1994), British judoka
- Malin Wollin (born 1978), Swedish journalist, writer and blogger

== See also ==
- Malin (disambiguation)
- Malin (surname)
