= Annie Creek =

Annie Creek may refer to:

- Annie Creek (South Dakota)
- Annie Creek (British Columbia)
