= Azu Mountain =

Mountain in the Northern Rockies of British Columbia

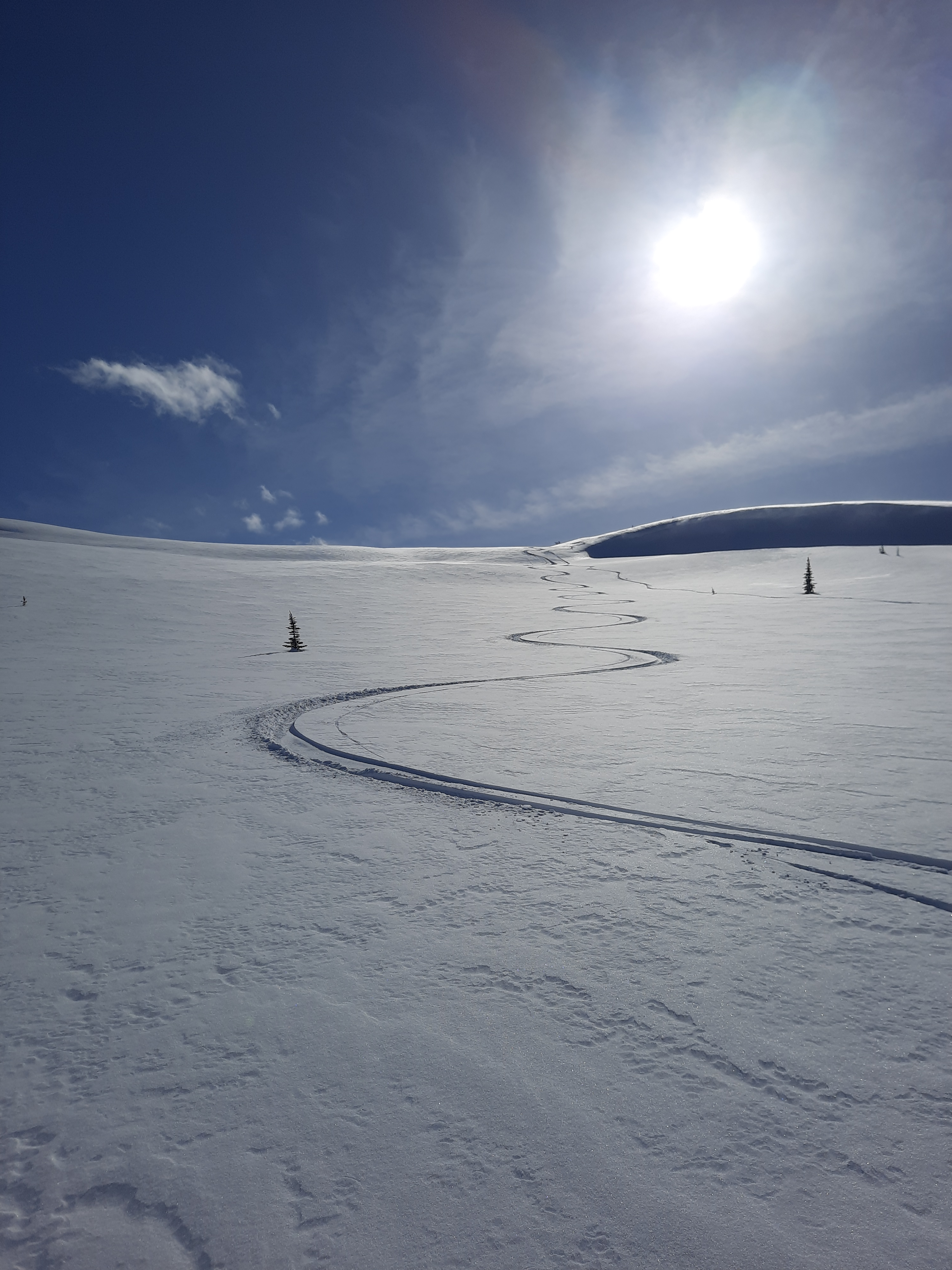

Highest point
- Elevation: 1,648 m (5,407 ft)
- Prominence: 78 m (256 ft)
- Parent peak: Powder King Peak
- Listing: Mountains of British Columbia
- Coordinates: 55°21′33″N 122°38′51″W

Geography
- Location within British Columbia Location within Canada
- Interactive map of Azu Mountain
- Location: Pine Pass; British Columbia, Canada
- District: Cariboo Land District
- Parent range: Misinchinka Ranges
- Topo map: NTS 93O7 Azouzetta Lake

Azu Mountain, is a 1,629-metre (5,344 ft) mountain in the Hart Ranges of the Northern Rockies of British Columbia. The mountain is situated approximately 27 kilometres southwest of Mackenzie, British Columbia. The name is an abbreviation of the nearby Azouzetta Lake and was officially adopted on March 26, 1985. The Azu Bowl is a popular local ski touring area and is easily accessible from the adjacent Powder King Mountain Resort.

Precipitation and snow melt runoff drains into Declier Creek to the south and the Pine River to the north.
