= Wollin (disambiguation) =

Wollin may also refer to:

== Place ==
- Wolin, Polish island
- Wollin, Brandenburg

== People ==
- Liv Wollin, Swedish golfer
- Malin Wollin, Swedish journalist
