= Pine River (British Columbia) =

River in British Columbia, Canada

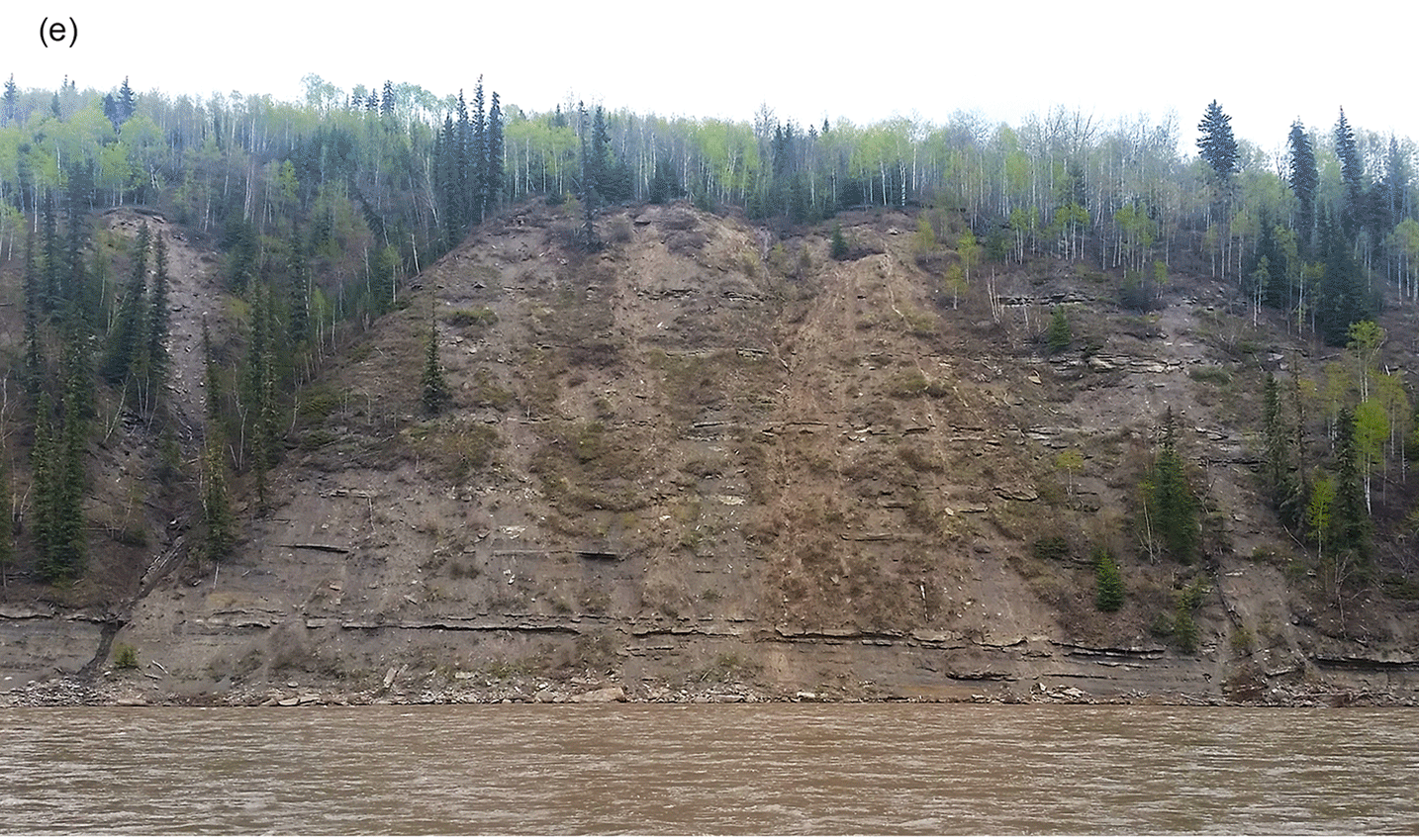
- An outcrop of the Dunvegan Formation along the Pine River

Location
- Country: Canada
- Province: British Columbia
- Regional District: Peace River

Physical characteristics
- Source
  - location: Pine Pass
  - coordinates: 55°20′43″N 122°40′50″W
- Mouth
  - location: Peace River
  - coordinates: 56°08′23″N 120°42′23″W
- Length: 287 km (178 mi)
- Basin size: 13,497 km^{2} (5,211 sq mi)
- Discharge
  - location: 55°43′06″N 121°12′41″W
  - average: 198 m^{3}/s (7,000 cu ft/s)

Basin features
- Cities: Chetwynd
- Tributaries
  - left: 23
  - right: 18
- Bridges: 15

The Pine River is a 287-kilometre (178 mi) river in the north-central Interior of British Columbia, Canada, rising in the Pine Pass in the Misinchinka Ranges on the north side of Azu Mountain and flowing northeast to join the Peace River.

== Tributaries ==
From source to mouth: Wolf Creek, Beaver Creek, Kathleen Creek, John Bennett Creek, Garbitt Creek, Callazon Creek, Link Creek, Silver Sands Creek, Mountain Creek, Cairns Creek, Lemoray Creek, Big Boulder Creek, Cleveland Creek, Fisher Creek, Beaudette Creek, Falling Creek, Willow Creek, Crassiar Creek, Fred Nelson Creek, Browns Creek, Fur Thief Creek, Rocket Creek, Ivorline Creek, Hasler Creek, Bowlder Creek, Commotion Creek, Young Creek, Stone Creek, Caron Creek, Bisette Creek, Wildmare Creek, Fernando Creek, Centurion Creek, Sukunka River, Stanley Creek, Wabi Creek, Murray River, Wallace Creek, Stewart Creek, Graveyard Creek, Windy Creek.

== Hasler Creek ==
To access the coal mine, a ferry operated across the Pine River in summer and an ice bridge existed in the winter. Trucks hauled the coal to Dawson Creek. In December 1944, a bridge replaced the ferry at this second crossing of the Pine off BC Highway 97 (Hart Highway). Prior to the completion of the highway bridge at East Pine in 1947, trucking was limited to the winter months because the ferry at that point was unsuitable for loaded coal trucks.

== See also ==
- List of rivers of British Columbia
