= TC PipeLines =

Former publicly traded master limited partnership

TC PipeLines, LP
- Type: Public
- Traded as: NYSE: TCP
- Industry: Oil & Gas Pipelines
- Key people: Stanley (Stan) Graham Chapman, III (Chairman), Nathan Brown (President)
- Parent: TC Energy (25.48%)
- Website: www.tcpipelineslp.com

TC PipeLines, LP was a publicly traded master limited partnership. TC Energy owned 25.48% of the outstanding units and controlled the general partner. TC PipeLines, LP, managed and owned natural gas pipelines in the United States, including 46.45% of Great Lakes Gas Transmission Limited Partnership, 50% of Northern Border Pipeline Company, 100% of Gas Transmission Northwest, and 100% of Tuscarora Gas Transmission Company. TC PipeLines, LP was based in Calgary, Alberta.
