= Pine Pass =

Mountain pass in British Columbia, Canada

- Location within British Columbia
- Elevation: 875 metres (2,871 ft)

Third Approach
- Location: British Columbia, Canada
- Range: Hart Ranges
- Coordinates: 55°24′00″N 122°38′00″W
- Topo map: NTS 93O7 Azouzetta Lake

The Pine Pass, in the Hart Ranges of the Northern Rockies of British Columbia, connects the Peace Country of the province's Northeastern Interior. Highway 97 and the Canadian National Railway (CNR) (formerly BC Rail network) traverse this mountain pass, which is the location of the Bijoux Falls Provincial Park, the Pine Le Moray Provincial Park, and the Powder King Mountain Resort at Azouzetta Lake.

== Transportation ==
Azouzetta Lake is a scheduled stop for BC Bus North.

== History ==
=== Discovery ===
Informed by First Nations guides, a deserter from the Simon Fraser party crossed the pass in 1806. In attempts from the east in 1873 and west in 1875, surveyors Charles Horetzky and Alfred Richard Cecil Selwyn, respectively, failed to rediscover the pass. Joseph Hunter was successful from the west in 1877, and George Dawson crossed with a pack train of over 90 horses and mules in 1879.

=== Railway ===
The Canadian Pacific Survey during 1879 favoured the Peace Pass or Pine Pass owing to the traffic readily generated by the fertile country, but being too far north, the Canadian Pacific Railway ultimately chose the Kicking Horse Pass. By the 1910s, the CPR was back surveying in the Peace and Pine passes, leaning toward the latter.

The Grand Trunk Pacific Railway charter specified the Peace Pass, Pine Pass or such other Rocky Mountains pass which was most convenient and practicable. After surveying the first two options during 1906–07, which encompassed 560,000 acres (2,300 km^{2}) of arable land east of the Rockies, the company opted for the "bleak sterile" country east of the Yellowhead Pass. No doubt motivated by the possibility of securing a "branch" line to Vancouver later (which proved unsuccessful), this decision hindered the Canadian Northern Railway, whose intention to follow this route was publicly known.

Railway companies that aborted proposals to build through the Pine Pass included: the Naas & Peace River Railway, the Pine Pass Railway, the Pacific & Hudson's Bay Railway, the Edmonton, Dunvegan & Bella Coola Railway, and the B.C. & Dawson Railway.

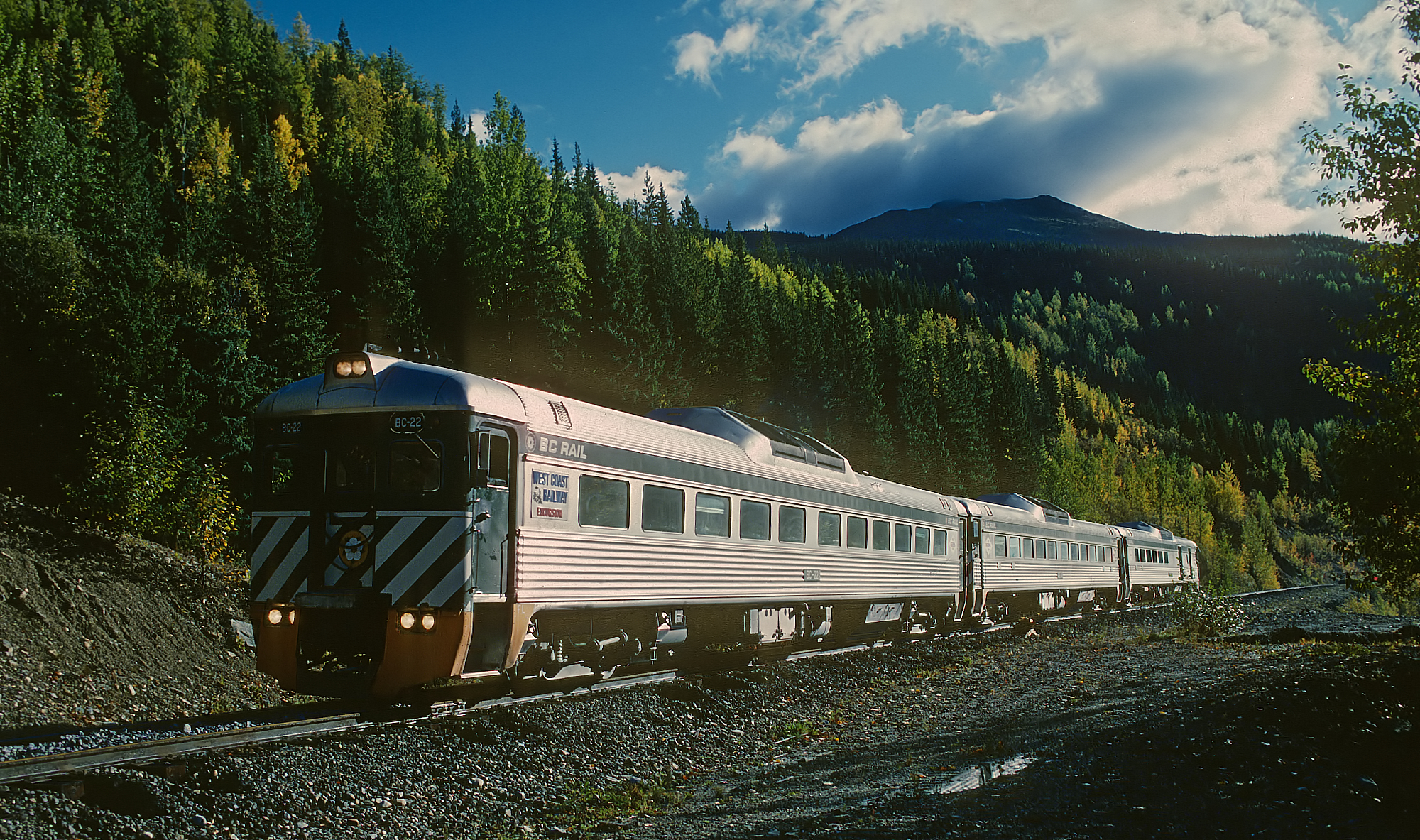
BC Rail excursion, near Pine Pass, 2015.

The Pacific Great Eastern Railway (PGE) was expected to route through the Pine Pass, and the Pine Pass Railway might have been a section of this proposal, or a Canadian Northern Railway one. A movement lobbying for a Wapiti Pass route gained no traction. When the company surveyed the Peace and Pine passes during 1920, the former's circuitous route through Finlay Forks was a recognized deterrent. When the PGE advance stalled, CPR engineers surveyed the Peace Pass/Finlay Forks route in 1923. Rumours of a possible CPR takeover of the PGE prompted speculation regarding this route being built to handle ore from the Ferguson group of mines, coal from the Peace River canyon, and Peace Country wheat.

During 1930, when the Northern Alberta Railways extended westward toward Dawson Creek, the CPR was again surveying routes across the Canadian Rockies. Although Monkman Pass was the shortest distance, a more northerly route better served the agricultural lands and mining prospects of the Peace Country. The greater engineering difficulties of the Pine Pass made Finlay Forks preferable. In 1945, the PGE formally filed plans for the Pine Pass route, because it was 100 miles (160 km) shorter, but lobbying for Finlay Forks continued.

When Monkman Pass was later considered, the northern Peace protested. With the narrow, precipitous, and loose shale conditions ultimately ruling out the Peace Pass, the Pine Pass option became a certainty, but the selection was theoretically left open by tendering the construction only as far north as the Parsnip River. However, within months, the government let the grading contracts south and north of Azouzetta Lake. The Pine Pass decision angered the Peace Pass supporters, who at least sought a Finlay Forks spur.

On December 13, 1957, the PGE track-laying machine crossed the Pine Pass summit at Mile 126, then waited at Mile 132 for blasting to finish on the approach to an unplanned one-quarter-mile (400 m) tunnel. Although the completed sections were already in commercial use, the rails did not reach Dawson Creek until September 1958. An inaugural run and golden spike ceremony followed a week later.

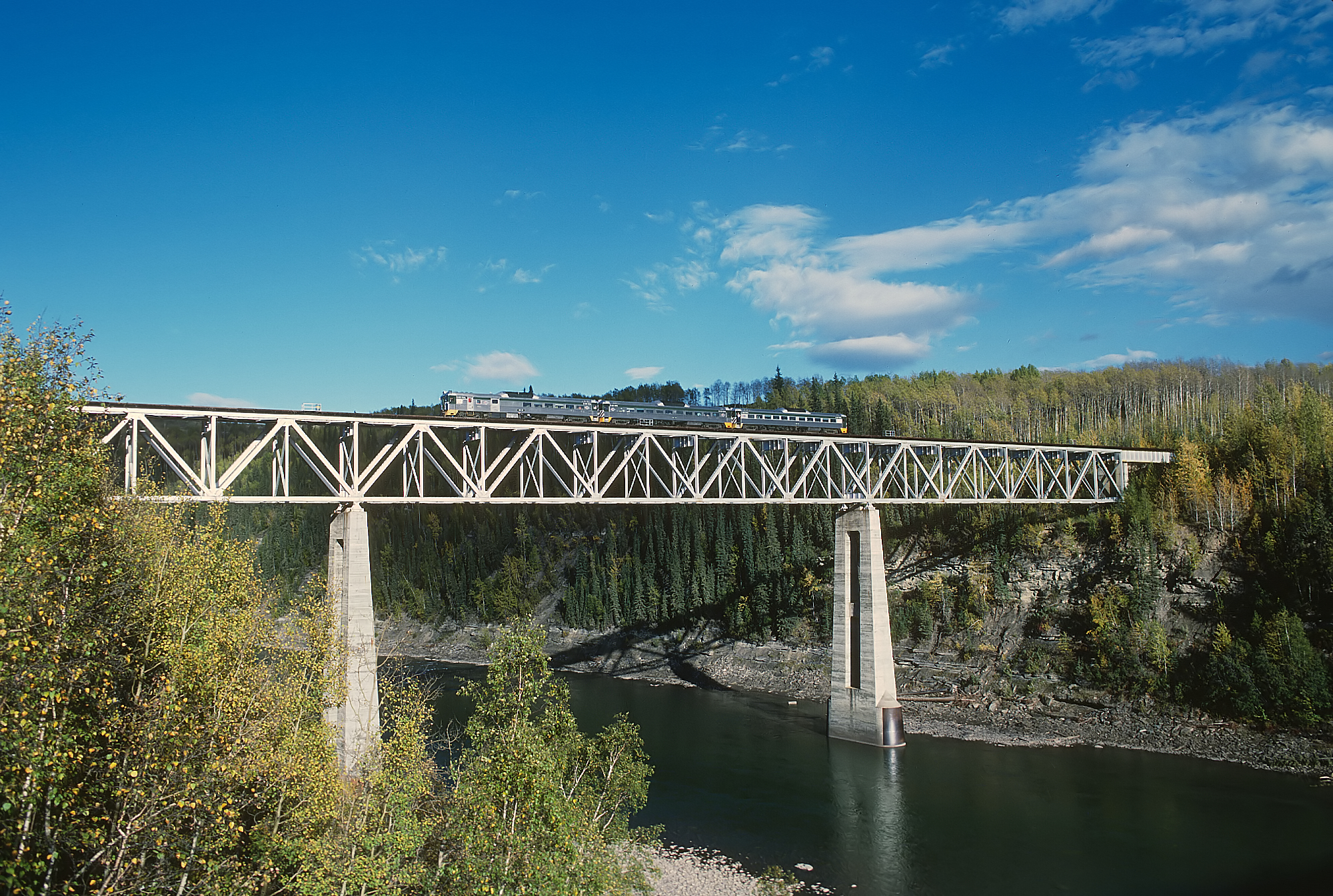
BC Rail excursion, near Pine Pass, 2015.

During the 1965/66 winter, a snowdrift derailed the three lead locomotives of a train near the pass. A crane came up from Squamish to lift the front diesel, and it took two days to reopen the line. Two months later, an ice buildup on the track derailed two locomotives and a freight car. In 1967, the PGE carried the 77-ton turbines for the W. A. C. Bennett Dam, which at the time set a record for the highest load in relation to its width transported on the line. The clearance in the Azouzetta Tunnel was 5 inches (130 mm).

To minimize snow from clogging the track and stalling locomotives, the 1971 dynamiting at Atunatchi Creek widened the right-of-way. The impact on the Azouzetta Lake environment attracted possibly unfair criticism. When a seven-week strike ended in January, 1975, it took several days to remove the snow and ice buildup in the pass before services resumed.

In 1982, an avalanche risk delayed the removal of a derailed snow plow, which also left two trains stranded in the area.

During the 1990s, 14 empty tank cars derailed 19 kilometres (12 mi) north of Azu village. A 23-car derailment spilled 2,100 tonnes of sulphur, which the railway sought to bury. Another 13-car derailment included six liquid natural gas tankers. A grain-hauling agreement between BC Rail and CNR established equal shipping rates for Peace area grain to Vancouver and Prince Rupert ports.

=== Highway ===
A 1923 B.C. Department of Lands map showed a wagon trail through the pass.

In 1930, the district provincial engineer intimated the cheaper Pine Pass route, with an estimated $800,000 cost, would be chosen for a highway. An alternate Peace Pass/Finlay Forks route proposed a connection through Manson Creek to the highway under construction from Fort St. James. The latter, known as the Turgeon Highway continued to receive federal funding as a mining road, but the public support was behind another option, the Monkman Pass. The positions of local members of parliament were ambiguous.

In 1943, the Peace, Pine, and Monkman passes were surveyed. The following year, Premier John Hart announced the decision to reconstruct 117 miles of old road and to construct 157 miles of new road over the Pine Pass. Access to agricultural land and mineral deposits determined the final choice. In 1945, the project was awarded in two sections: Mile 0 (Summit Lake) to Mile 94 (Azouzetta Lake) for $1,823,555 and Mile 94 to Mile 151 for $1,308,940. The prime contractor for the southwest section, Campbell Construction, experienced extreme unforeseen difficulties, and abandoned the uncompleted project. After calling new tenders, the lowest bid of $1,446,831 from W. C. Arnett & Co. was accepted. Fred Mannix & Co. completed their northeast section in 1948. Owing to significant changes to the contract with respect to labour-related issues, both Campbell and Mannix sued the province and reached settlements.

The modest gravel highway was usable by the fall of 1951, but was barely passable during that winter. The route officially opened the following summer, but could be challenging even in fine weather. In the spring of 1955, the section south of the pass to the Parsnip River was approaching impassibility, with three stretches negotiated by Highway Department equipment towing all traffic.

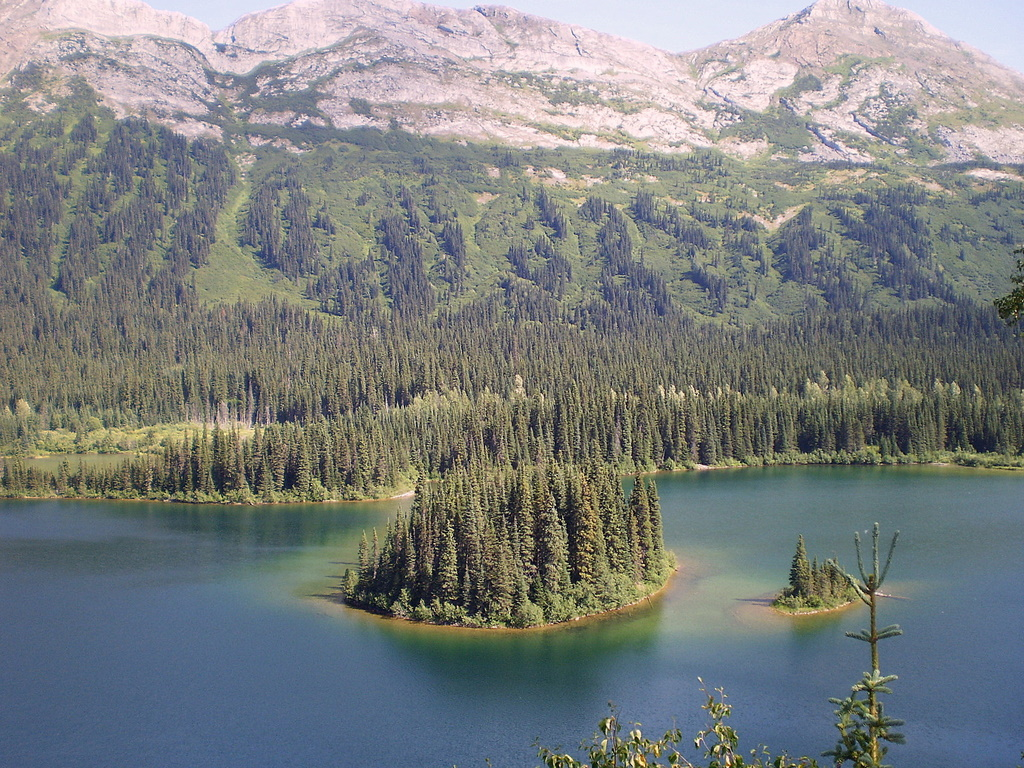
Azouzetta Lake, Pine Pass, 2009.

In 1962, work around Mount Le Moray at the northern end of the pass brought the road up to a standard for grading. Despite promises regarding the imminent paving of the complete Hart Highway, it was not until 1963 that a 33.2-mile (53.4 km) contract was awarded for the pass and its southern approach, and 1964 for the adjoining 9.2-mile (14.8 km) northern approach. By 1977, the 14-mile (23 km) section comprising the pass summit and southern approaches, previously paved in 1964, was beyond repair. The work to replace the base and repave was completed in 1978. The adjoining 13.3-kilometre (8.3 mi) section north to the rail tunnel was rebuilt and repaved in 1985 at a cost of $12 million.

During 1990–91, three bridges were replaced as part of a widening and straightening project. Throughout 1994–96, TNL Paving undertook a $10 million reconstruction of the 11.4-kilometre (7.1 mi) Bijoux Falls to Azouzetta Lake section, applying a porous three-inch diameter gravel foundation. When the road was previously rebuilt during 1977–78, the gravel and cement base mixture hindered drainage, which soon caused frost heaves. During 1997–98, a 4.2-kilometre (2.6 mi) section, which adjoined to the southwest, was rebuilt. In 1998, single pass paving was laid north from Azouzetta Lake to Bennett Creek. The following year, Peters Bros. Construction repaved a crumbling 13-kilometre (8.1 mi) section to the south of the pass.

Despite this investment, a report by the Northern Development Initiative Trust pressed for a further $135 million worth of improvements. During 2010–2011, Cariboo Construction undertook an $18.5 million reconstruction of the remaining 11.2-kilometre (7.0 mi) section north of Bennett Creek to Link Creek, the only portion untouched over the previous 25 years. Replacing two major bridges over the Pine River and two minor ones over creeks, the total cost was $40 million. In 2011, a two-day stretch of heavy rain caused washouts at 15 sites. More than 100 workers, and more than 60 pieces of equipment, took nearly two weeks to reopen the highway to single-lane traffic. Five years later, damage from torrential downpours closed the highway for almost a week.

=== Tourism ===
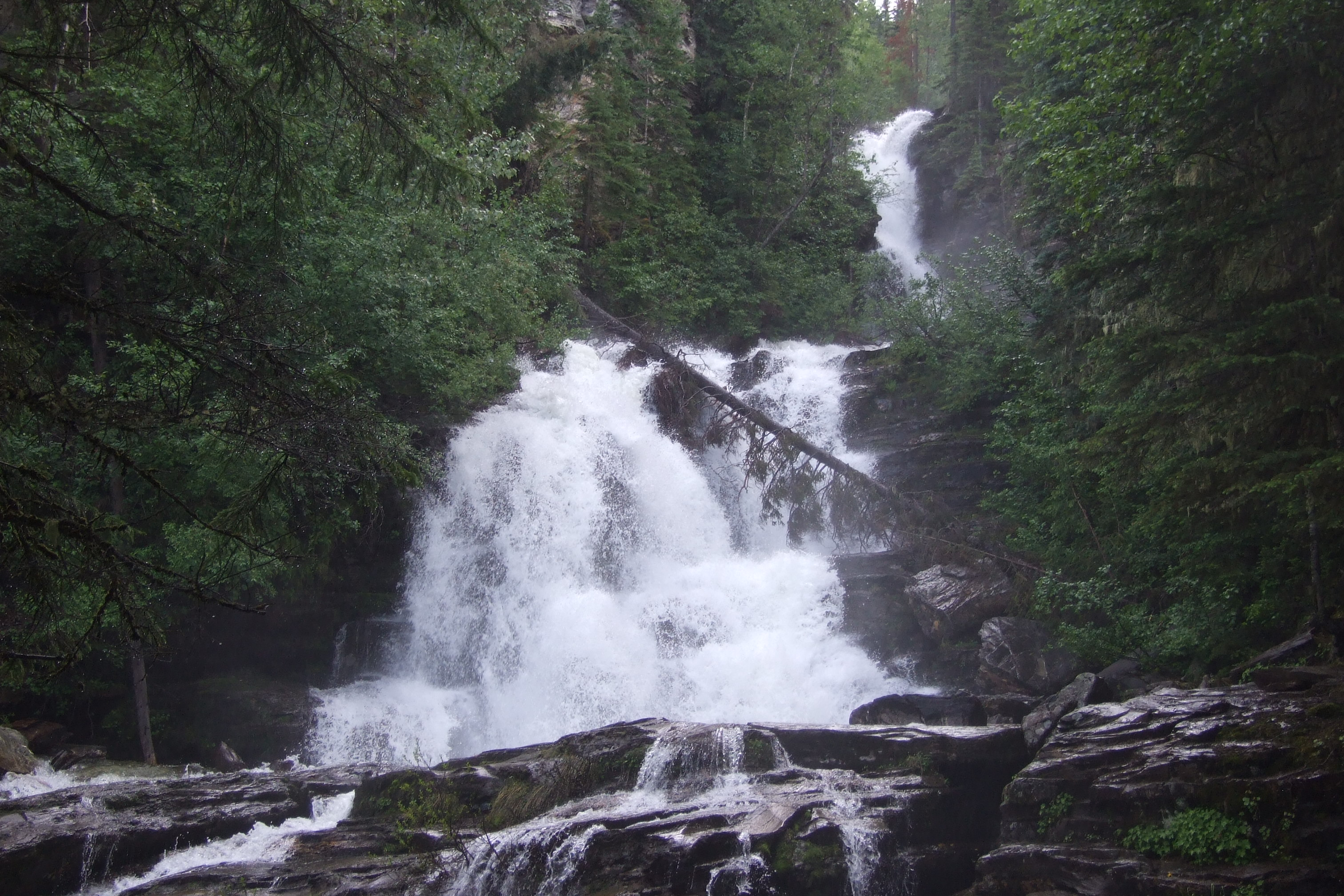
Bijoux Falls, Pine Pass, 2008.

Established in 1956, the Bijoux Falls Provincial Park is on the southern approach.

Purchasing a property in 1952 at Mile 124 (4.8 km [3 mi] southwest of Azouzetta Lake), Katherine Winnifred Begallie and Michael Leo Begallie opened Halfway Lodge in 1955. The following year, a forest fire almost destroyed the building. In the early 1960s, a gas pump was installed, and Leo married Nora Cunningham. At the time, Halfway Lodge and Azu Village were the only accommodation in the immediate area. The pair managed the lodge and café, with Norman and Linda Davis taking over the latter in 1968.

Several investors owned the Azu Ski Village, which opened in 1965 and eventually grew into four runs with a T-bar and an 4.5-hectare (11-acre) weekend cottage subdivision. The earlier dormitory accommodation, dining facilities, and day lodge, were augmented in 1969 with motel units and a new day lodge. Ferdinand (Ferry) Stroble, the proprietor, requested his ashes be spread on the mountain when he died at 81. By 1974, the location possessed a liquor licence and gas pumps. Sold in 1979 to Kerry O’Connor, Powder King was launched on an adjacent site to the north.

Opened in the early 1950s and for sale in 1963, the Pine Valley Lodge, operating at Mile 171 (an eastern extremity, 39 km [24 mi] west of Chetwynd), comprised cabins, a café and garage. In the 1950s, the next gas station on the way to Prince George was 137 kilometres (85 mi) away at McLeod Lake. Slightly nearer at Mile 93 (a western extremity), Windy Point Lodge opened in 1965, at Mile 97 (Mackenzie turnoff), with a café and Esso pumps. Also opened later, the Silver Sands Motel at Mile 147 received a liquor licence in 1975. For sale in 1986, the Silver Sands Lodge comprised a coffee shop, store, gas pumps, tire shop, cabins and rooms. A fire destroyed the main lodge in 2014, but spared the cabins.

The Pine Valley Park Lodge was described as 23 kilometres (14 mi) from Honeymoon Creek, namely at the north end of Azouzetta Lake. Under a loan default sale in 1977, it comprised lodge accommodation, restaurant and service station. Newspaper articles sometimes appear to misname it as the Pine Valley Lodge. In the same vein, the Pine Valley Lodge was equally placed at Mile 144. It was renamed Azouzetta Lake Lodge, listed for sale in 2002, mothballed in 2012, and purchased by the Powder King Mountain Resort in 2016.

The Pine Le Moray Provincial Park, on the northern approach, was established in 2000.

=== Pipelines and high-voltage lines ===
During 1952, Westcoast Transmission survey crews marked a route through the pass for a natural gas pipeline to the lower mainland. In 1955, the company was granted a two-year extension for completing the $162-million 650-mile (1,050 km) line, and permission to increase the 24-inch (61 cm) pipeline diameter to 80-inch (2.0 m).

To construct an oil pipeline through the pass, pipes were railed there over the recently completed section of the PGE in early 1958. Western Pacific Products and Crude Oil Pipelines connected Taylor and Kamloops in late 1961.

Extending from the W. A. C. Bennett Dam, the 500,000-volt transmission lines through the pass were in place by 1967.

During the 1980s, replacement natural gas pipes were railed to Azu. To facilitate the transmission of higher volumes of gas, the single pipeline was upgraded to narrower pipes laid in dual formation. With new construction at the ski resort close to the 200-metre-wide transmission corridor, the safety code specified thicker pipes be installed.

Westcoast Energy and the province shared the cost of relocating a 25-kilometre (16 mi) section of gas pipelines in 1990.

With the 2011 heavy rain and flooding, Pembina temporarily shut down its oil pipeline as a proactive measure before rectifying erosion and assessing the line for damage.

=== Communications, electricity connections, and water/sewer infrastructure ===
In the late 1950s, the relay transmitter station for the PGE's new microwave radio system was located at Azouzetta Lake. Third parties leased channels not required by the railway.

During the late 1980s, the Ministry of Health installed repeater stations in the pass to address reception problems experienced by first responders. BC Hydro extended the power lines from Honeymoon Creek to connect Azu to the electrical grid. Upfront customer contributions and amortization over a five-year period recovered the $272,000 project cost. The regional district approved the installation of a water and sewer system at an amortized cost of $351,440 that was recovered from users over subsequent years.

=== School bus ===
The school bus terminated at Honeymoon Creek, but Pine Pass parents were able to extend the route a further 14 miles (23 km) to the Azu community from the 1970/71 school year. When the school board withdrew the service for the 1972/73 year, because of cost, it affected less than 10 students. Withholding their children from school, an unwillingness to compromise, and lobbying, parents pressured the province to resume the service, which lapsed when no longer required. When a family of four moved to Azouzetta Lake in 1977, the school board agreed to increase the travel allowance to $7.60 per day to cover the parent's drive to connect with the bus, however, efforts continued to restore a 100 percent subsidy from the province for a bus service. For the 1989/90 year, despite nine or 10 children living in the village, the school bus connection further withdrew to the Mackenzie turnoff, 25 miles (40 km) away. From the 1990/91 year, the bus terminus was restored once more to Azu village (Powder King), but was returned to the Mackenzie turnoff from the 1997/98 year, because of low ridership. The board rejected a parental plea in 2000 to restore the service.

=== Sundry notable incidents ===
In 1959, a solo commercial pilot experiencing engine trouble, died on crashing near Mount Le Moray and the PGE right-of-way.

A Beech 35 made an emergency landing at Azouzetta Lake in 1967.

A car crash in 1988 killed the basketball coach and five senior team members from the Bethel Christian School.

In 1994, the pilot and the four-firefighter passengers, escaped unhurt from a helicopter crash north of Azu village. On a curve days later, 24 kilometres (15 mi) north of the village, a truck hauling two tanker trailers overturned, and 31,000 litres (8,200 US gal) of gasoline and more than 14,000 litres (3,700 US gal) of diesel spilled into the river.

During the 1997–98 highway reconstruction project, Dale Rolland Alexander assaulted a flagperson on duty in the early hours of the morning, but was not located and remanded in custody until 15 months later. Bail denied, his trial commenced in due course, and he was found guilty of sexual assault causing bodily harm, sexual assault with a weapon, kidnapping, uttering threats and possession of a weapon for a dangerous purpose. Prior to his dangerous-offender assessment, he dismissed his lawyer. The hearings during 2001–02, included the victim impact statement, and noted an unsuccessful appeal, his attitude of denial, an unrelated assault on a police officer, and threatening to kill his former mother-in-law. He served a nine-year sentence. After he failed to return to his halfway house in Vancouver, as required under the conditions of his long-term supervision order, a Canada-wide arrest warrant was issued in 2013 for the high-risk sex offender.

During the 2000/01 winter, two snowmobilers died in an avalanche.

In 2014, 8 kilometres (5 mi) south of the village at Stack Creek, 58 firefighters and two helicopters contained a 1,625 hectares (16.25 km^{2}) wildfire. Two years later, a semi hauling an explosive substance rolled into a ditch, closing the highway for much of the day.
