= Malins =

Malins may refer to:

- Geoffrey Malins (1886–1940), a British film director
- Humfrey Malins (born 1945), a British Conservative Party politician
- Julian Malins (born 1950), a British barrister
- Richard Malins (1805–1882), an English barrister, judge, and politician

== See also ==
- Germans Māliņš (born 1987), a Latvian professional footballer
- Malin (disambiguation)
