= Annie Creek (British Columbia) =

Location
- Country: Canada
- Province: British Columbia
- Regional District: Fraser Fort-George

Physical characteristics
- Source
  - location: Azu Mountain
  - coordinates: 55°20′59″N 122°38′4″W
- Mouth
  - location: Declier Creek
  - coordinates: 55°21′5″N 122°35′59″W
- Length: 2.7 km (1.7 mi)

Basin features
- River system: Parsnip River

Annie Creek is a small river in the Hart Ranges of the Northern Rockies of British Columbia.
