= Peace Pipe Line =

Canadian pipeline company

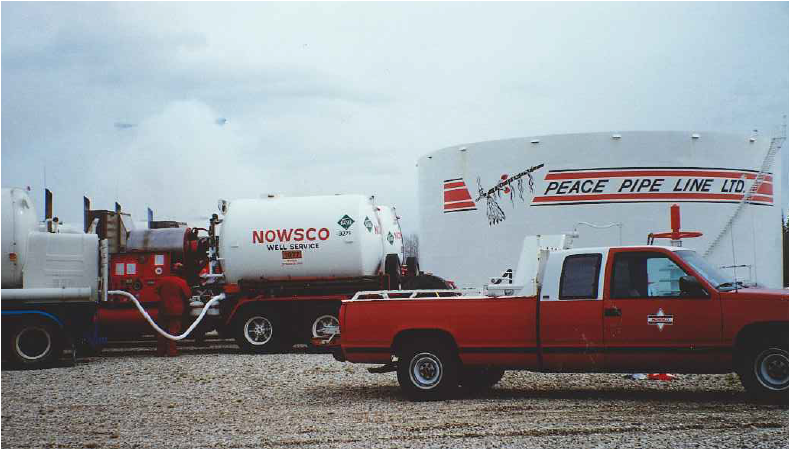

Peace Pipe Line Ltd. was a pipeline company that operated in the Canadian provinces of Alberta and British Columbia. The pipeline's headquarters were in Calgary, Alberta, with division offices in Valleyview, Alberta, Grande Prairie, Alberta, Whitecourt, Alberta and Dawson Creek, BC and the control centre was located in Edmonton, Alberta. The Peace Pipe Line, its subsidiaries; Pouce Coupe and Plateau, were in part, predecessors of today's Pembina Pipeline Corporation.

The Peace Pipe Line had two major supplies to Fox Creek, Alberta. A 12-inch line, coined the Deep Basin line, which originated from the Brassey field in BC and ran to LaGlace via Gordondale. From LaGlace, the Deep Basin ran straight south, (west of Grande Prairie), with gathering points and stations at Wapiti, Bald Mountain, Kakwa, then turned eastward across the Smoky River to gathering points and stations at Lator, Simonette and Tony Creek before terminating at Fox Creek. The second major route to Fox Creek originated in Red Earth and ran to Valleyview with gathering points and pump stations at Cranberry, Foster and Gilwood and consisted of two loop segments. The Valleyview to Fox Creek portion of the Peace was a 16-inch line. From Fox Creek, the Peace system went south to Edson Terminal via 12-inch line to connect to the TransMountain system and also delivered eastward to Edmonton on a loop system of a 12-inch and 20-inch lines with gathering points and stations at Windfall Jct, Whitecourt, and Glenevis. By the end of 1990, Peace Pipe Line's system was directly serving 27 crude oil fields between Alberta and British Columbia and over 20 gas processing plants with seven truck unloading terminals. Peace Pipe Line was sold to Pembina Corporation on October 31, 1991.

== Incorporation and production ==
Oil was discovered in 1954 about 220 miles (355 km) north west of Edmonton, Alberta in the oilfields known as a Sturgeon Lake, Sturgeon Lake South and Little Smoky. With a demand for market access, six of the producing companies in the area joined forces and incorporated Peace River Oil Pipe Line Co. Ltd. on November 17, 1954. The six equal owners were; AMERADA Petroleum Corp., Canadian Gulf Oil Co., Hudson's Bay Oil and Gas Company, Imperial Oil Ltd., Shell Oil Co., and Union Oil Company of California.

The British American Oil Co. Ltd (B/A) and consequently its subsidiaries, including Britamoil, merged with Canadian Gulf Oil Co. at the emergence of the pipeline and as such, The Peace River Oil Pipe Line Co. Ltd was operated by Britamoil, from 1955 to 1963, when a separate management group was established. In 1955, $7 million was spent to construct the first mainline portion of the pipeline to transport crude oil from the Sturgeon Lake fields to the Trans Mountain Pipe line pump station at Edson. The first leg of the line was a 16-inch pipeline from the Valleyview pump station which was situated 12 km south of Valleyview, Alberta, and ran to Fox Creek, Alberta. The mainline continued from Fox Creek to Edson via 12-inch line.

1956 was Peace River Oil's first year of operation, with a total of 145 miles (233 km) and delivering a daily average of 9093 barrels. Nearly all of the transported product was owned by the major six shareholders. During this same time, several refineries in Edmonton were being constructed to accommodate the expansive market demand of the growing exploration and discoveries in the province. In 1961, a major extension to the system was undertaken with the construction of a pipeline from the Fox Creek pump station to Edmonton, Alberta, with connections to the TransMountain Pipe Line, Interprovincial Pipe Line and to the new local refineries. By this time, approximately 65% of the stream was owner production, with capacity being supplied by other new producers. In 1961, additional ownership shares were issued to fund the construction, bringing the total number of shares to 272,388.

1963 was a busy year for Peace, starting with a separate management group, as the Peace River Oil Pipe Line had taken over its management from Britamoil and established a head office in Calgary with 13 employees in addition to 20 field employees, for a total of 33 staff. During the same time, a gathering line was completed from Valleyview to Snipe Lake and construction began on a new 120-mile (193 km), 8-inch trunk line from Snipe Lake to Red Earth, Alberta, and a further 8-inch line from Red Earth to Nipisi, which was all completed in 1964. Other projects during this era included gathering lines to Goose River, Sturgeon Lake South and to Kaybob South. By the end of the year, Peace River Oil was operating 581 miles (935 km) of pipeline.

=== Increased output and expansion ===
From 1962 to 1965 there was an increase of 10,300 barrels/day to the pipeline system. In early 1965, The company began construction of the Edmonton Control Centre and a microwave radio communication system to enhance its operational efficiency. By the end of this year, the company's throughput was an average 55,562 barrels/day with over 691 miles (1112 km) of pipe. By the end of this year, approximately 55% of the stream came from the owners’ production. Construction began on a 20-inch line from Valleyview to Zama, north-west of High Level, Alberta, which was complete in mid-March 1968.

In 1968, part of the Fox Creek to Edmonton upgrade to a 20-inch line was completed as part of a looping system. Peace River Oil now had a throughput of over 71,000 barrels/day, with five separate streams of oil being transported, and a total of 1151 miles (1852 km) of pipe with 61 employees. With so much growth, additional shares were issued, increasing the total to 389,055.

Beginning in 1969, Peace River Oil's volumes of crude oil and natural gas liquids coming into Fox Creek had insufficient capacity to Edmonton with only one line. 78 miles (125 km) of 20-inch line was built to complete the looping of line between Fox Creek and Edmonton. The 20-inch portion of line was used for crude oil service, and the adjacent 12-inch line was used for condensate and LPGs.

The Zama field north-west of High Level, Alberta, never had realized oil production as projected, however, had substantial dry gas production. As such, Peace River Oil's 20-inch pipeline from Zama to Valleyview (Northwest System) had difficulty delivering profitability, and in 1971, the Peace River Oil Pipe Line sold the Northwest system to Alberta Gas Trunk Line for approximately $25 million. This sale affected Peace River Oil's throughput and reduced crude oil volumes by 12,300 barrels/day and reduced the staff to 58 employees. Peace River Oil Pipe Line negotiated long-term throughput agreements with three major gas plants in the Kaybob South area this year.

=== System changes ===
In 1973, the company changed its name as operations were no longer conducted in the Peace River area, for brevity's sake, and to relate to the ceremonial indigenous peace pipe symbol. Peace River Oil Pipe Line's name was changed to Peace Pipe Line Ltd. effective November 22, 1973.

Effective the first day of January, 1979, Peace Pipe Line converted to the metric system to align with the rest of the industry. Continued expansion was occurring within the system, and Peace had up to 85 employees by the end of the year, with a daily average throughput of 145,466 barrels/day (23,116 cubic meters) over 1598 km (993 miles) of pipe.

In August 1980, Peace received approval to construct the Deep Basin line, a 240 km, 12-inch line from the LaGlace (~40 km North West of Grande Prairie, Alberta) to Fox Creek. The expansion came in at a cost of $32 million and grew the workforce of Peace Pipe to a total 90 employees delivering 18 different streams of oil over a total 1912 km of pipe. The construction of the Deep Basin was completed in 1981, and Peace Pipe grew its workforce by a third, to 120 employees, but daily throughput was reduced by imposed provincial cutbacks from March 1 to September 1.

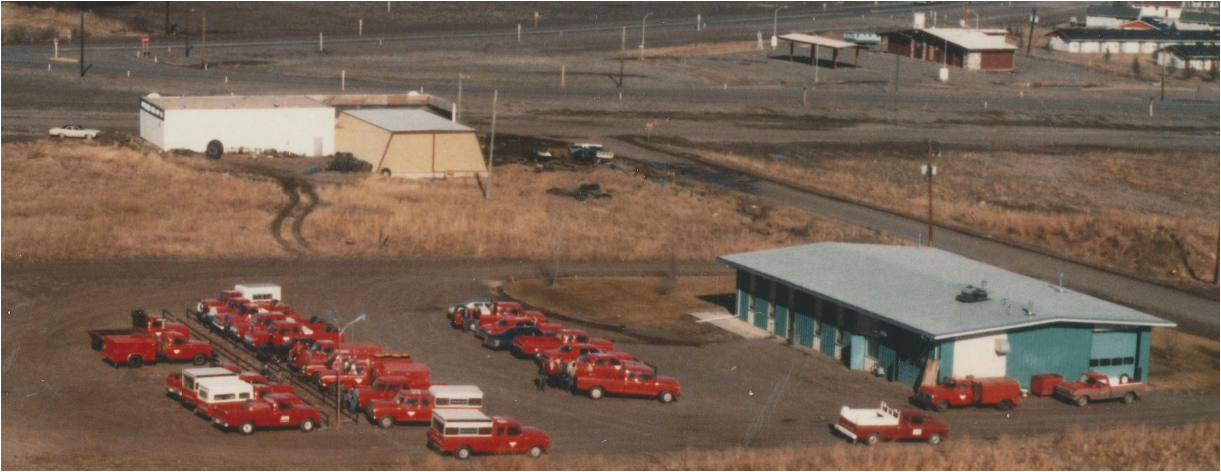
Valleyview Office

With continued exploration in the Peace Pipe's operating area, volumes continued to increase over the next few years with a major expansion north along and connecting to the Deep Basin. A crude-oil gathering system was built to connect to the Valhalla field in 1985 and this system was further extended north east of LaGlace to connect to crude-oil production in the Spirit River and Rycroft areas. Peace Pipe also constructed major new facilities to handle the growing production of Ethane under long-term throughput agreements from three plants in the LaGlace, Elmworth and Wapiti areas. In October 1985, a permanent field office for the Deep Basin was located in Grande Prairie, Alberta, to manage the experienced and projected growth. By the end of 1986, staff levels spiked to 241 employees working at Peace Pipe Line.

== Subsidiaries and selling of company ==
In 1988, construction began on an 8-inch pipeline from LaGlace north-west to connect to Gordondale, where a new truck unloading terminal was built. In February 1989, two wholly owned subsidiary companies were created. The Pouce Coupe Pipe Line Ltd. was a 25 km, 8-inch section from Gordondale to Dawson Creek, British Columbia, crossing the Alberta and British Columbia Border. The Plateau Pipe Line Ltd. would continue west of Dawson Creek another 40 km to serve the Brassey Field. Peace Pipe Line created the subsidiaries to better account tariffs and manage regulatory requirements. Peace Pipe Line was registered as Alberta Company, needing only to liaise with the then, ERCB, whereas the Pouce Coupe was a federally registered entity as it crossed provincial boundaries and would tariff would be set by the National Energy Board. The Plateau Pipe Line was registered as a provincial entity in British Columbia and was regulated by the OGC (British Columbia Oil and Gas Commission).

After a number of trying bids by organizations, competitors and industry producers, the 12 shareholders (Amoco Canada Resources Inc., Shell Canada Ltd., Gulf Canada Resources Ltd., Amerada Minerals Corporation of Canada Ltd., Unocal Canada Ltd., Petro-Canada inc., Mobil Oil Canada Ltd., Husky Oil Operations Ltd., Esso Canada Resources Ltd., Scurry-Rainbow Oil Ltd., and Luscar Ltd.,) of Peace Pipe Line Ltd were realigning focus on production and exploration, thus decided to sell the company. Peace Pipe Line and subsidiaries were sold to Pembina Corporation (now Pembina Pipeline Corporation), effective October 31, 1991.
