= Northern Border Pipeline =

Northern Border Pipeline is a natural gas pipeline which brings gas from Canada through Montana, North Dakota, South Dakota, Minnesota, and Iowa into the Chicago area. It is owned by TC PipeLines, LP and ONEOK Partners and is operated by TC PipeLines, LP . Its FERC code is 89.
