= Veresen =

Veresen Inc.
- Company type: Public company
- Industry: Natural Gas/Pipelines
- Defunct: 2017
- Fate: Acquired by Pembina Pipeline
- Headquarters: Calgary, Alberta, Canada
- Key people: Don L. Althoff, CEO; Stephen W. C. Mulherin, Chairman
- Website: www.vereseninc.com

Veresen Inc. was a Calgary, Alberta-based energy infrastructure company with three main lines of business: pipelines, natural gas and power generation. It was a publicly-traded company on the Toronto Stock Exchange, and was known as Fort Chicago Energy Partners L.P. In 2017, it was acquired by Pembina Pipeline for $9.7 billion.

== Business segments ==
=== Pipelines ===
- Alliance Pipeline (owned in partnership with Aux Sable Liquid Products) - a 3,000 km natural gas pipeline between western Canada and the US mid-west.
- Alberta Ethane Gathering System (AEGS) - a 1,300 km pipeline network that delivers ethane to Nova Chemicals plant in Joffre, Alberta and Dow Chemicals plant in Fort Saskatchewan, Alberta.

=== Natural gas ===
- Aux Sable Liquid Products - a natural gas liquids plant near Chicago producing methane, ethane, propane, butane.
- Alton Gas Storage facility - proposed to be located in Alton, Nova Scotia
- Jordan Cove Energy Project - a proposed LNG export terminal at the Port of Coos Bay in Oregon

=== Power generation ===
- Fort Chicago's Power - a co-generation and electrical power business with:
  - Charlottetown, Prince Edward Island - district heating and power generation plant
  - London, Ontario district heating and power generation plant (producing 17 MW of electricity and 52 MW for the district heating system)
  - Ripon, California - district heating and power generation plant
  - San Gabriel, California - district heating and power generation plant
  - Brush II - 70 MW generation facility in Brush, Colorado
  - East Windsor - 84 MW generation facility that supplies heat to Ford's plant in Windsor, Ontario as well as electricity
  - NRGreen Power - subsidiary of Alliance that operates four 5 MW generating stations using waste heat from pipeline pumping station in Saskatchewan
  - Swift Power L.P. - purchased by Veresen Inc. Swift Power L.P. is developing run of the river hydro projects in British Columbia

== Move into renewable energy ==
Beginning in the spring of 2010, Fort Chicago began aggressively moving into the renewable energy sector, with a particular focus on British Columbia.

=== Pristine Power ===
In September 2010, Fort Chicago reached an agreement to purchase Pristine Power, which develops biomass and hydro power projects. Prior to this transaction, Fort Chicago had an 11.4% stake in Pristine.

In September 2009, Pristine Power increased its ownership position from 10% to 47% in the Klinaklini project proposed by Kleana Power. The deal was structured as a nominal down payment with future payments coming after various milestones, notably the signing of a PPA (however the project was unsuccessful in 2008 Call). With this deal, Pristine increased its ownership position in several other projects, including Machmell River, and expected that its generation portfolio would double to 282 MW.

=== ENMAX Power Corporation ===
In September 2010, Fort Chicago reached an agreement to purchase three BC-based hydro assets of ENMAX, the City of Calgary's municipally owned electric utility.

British Columbia based hydro assets
- Furry Creek Hydro, in operation since 2004 with a 3 km penstock which drops 366 meters to an 11 MW Pelton wheel. The plant is 40 km north of Vancouver accessed by the Sea to Sky highway.
- Clowhom Hydro has two run-of-river hydroelectric plants located northeast of Sechelt, BC. Upper Clowhom has a 1900-meter penstock leading to an 11 MW turbine. Similarly Lower Clowhom has a 1200-meter penstock leading to an identical 11 MW turbine.
- Culliton Creek Hydro Facility is a run-of-river hydroelectric project commissioned in May 2016, located 20 km north of Squamish, BC. A 3 km penstock delivers water downstream to the powerhouse housing two 7.5 MW turbines. (Veresen owns a 50% interest)
