= Bijoux Falls Provincial Park =

Provincial park in British Columbia, Canada

- IUCN category II (national park) <!!-- images -->
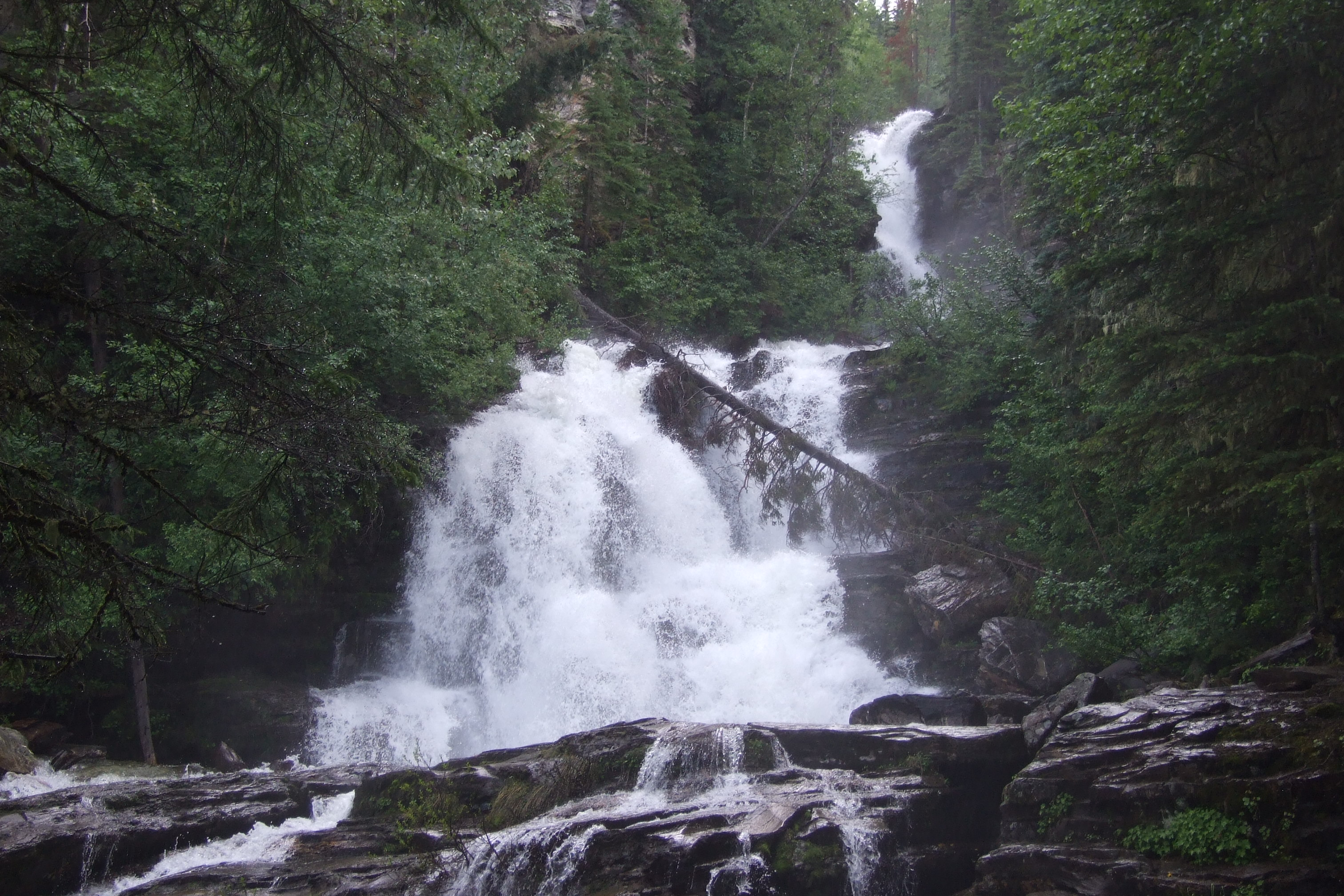
- Bijoux Falls <.-- map -->

- Location within British Columbia
- Interactive map of Bijoux Falls Provincial Park
- Location: British Columbia, Canada
- Nearest town: Mackenzie
- Coordinates: 55°18′45″N 122°40′07″W
- Area: 40 ha (99 acres)
- Established: March 16, 1956
- Operator: BC Parks
- Owner: <?-- website: embedded -->

Bijoux Falls Provincial Park is a provincial park in British Columbia, Canada. The park is located north of the city of Prince George on BC Highway 97 on the southern approach to the summit of the Pine Pass through the Rocky Mountains. The park was established in 1956 primarily to serve as a rest stop and to provide information about the park system in BC to travellers. The park is named for Bijoux Falls a 40-metre-high (130 ft) cascading waterfall that is the central feature of the park.
