= Powder King Mountain Resort =

Ski resort in British Columbia, Canada

- Interactive map of Powder King Mountain Resort
- Location: British Columbia, Canada
- Nearest city: Prince George, 194 km (121 mi)
- Coordinates: 55°21′47″N 122°37′29″W
- Vertical: 640 m (2,100 feet)
- Top elevation: (lift serviced) 1,575m (5,166 ft)
- Skiable area: 597 ha (1,475 acres)
- Trails: 37 total 33% beginner 43% intermediate 24% expert
- Longest run: 6 km (19,685 ft)
- Lift system: 3 total 1 triple chair 1 T-Bar; 1 Rope Tow
- Website: www.powderking.com

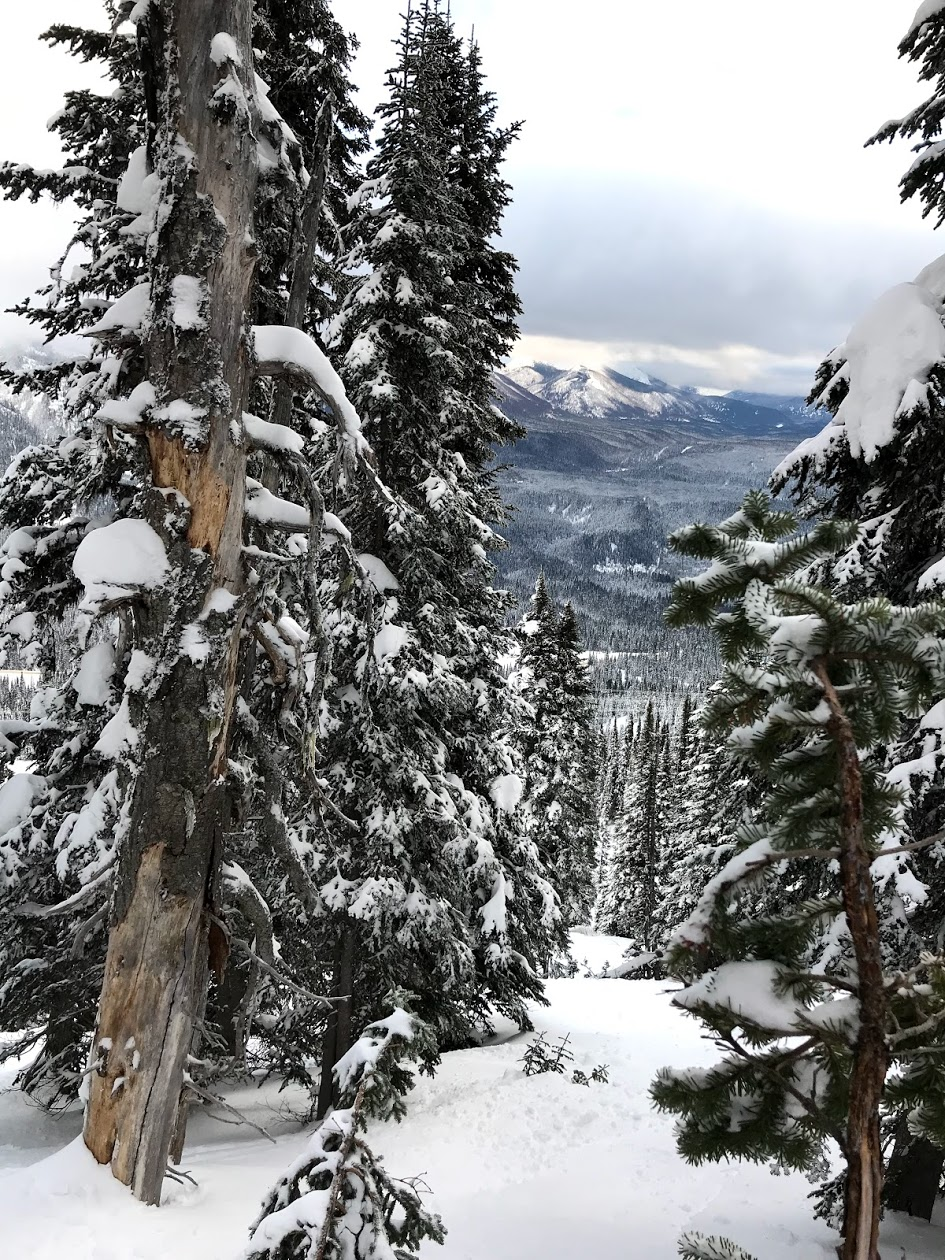
Powder King

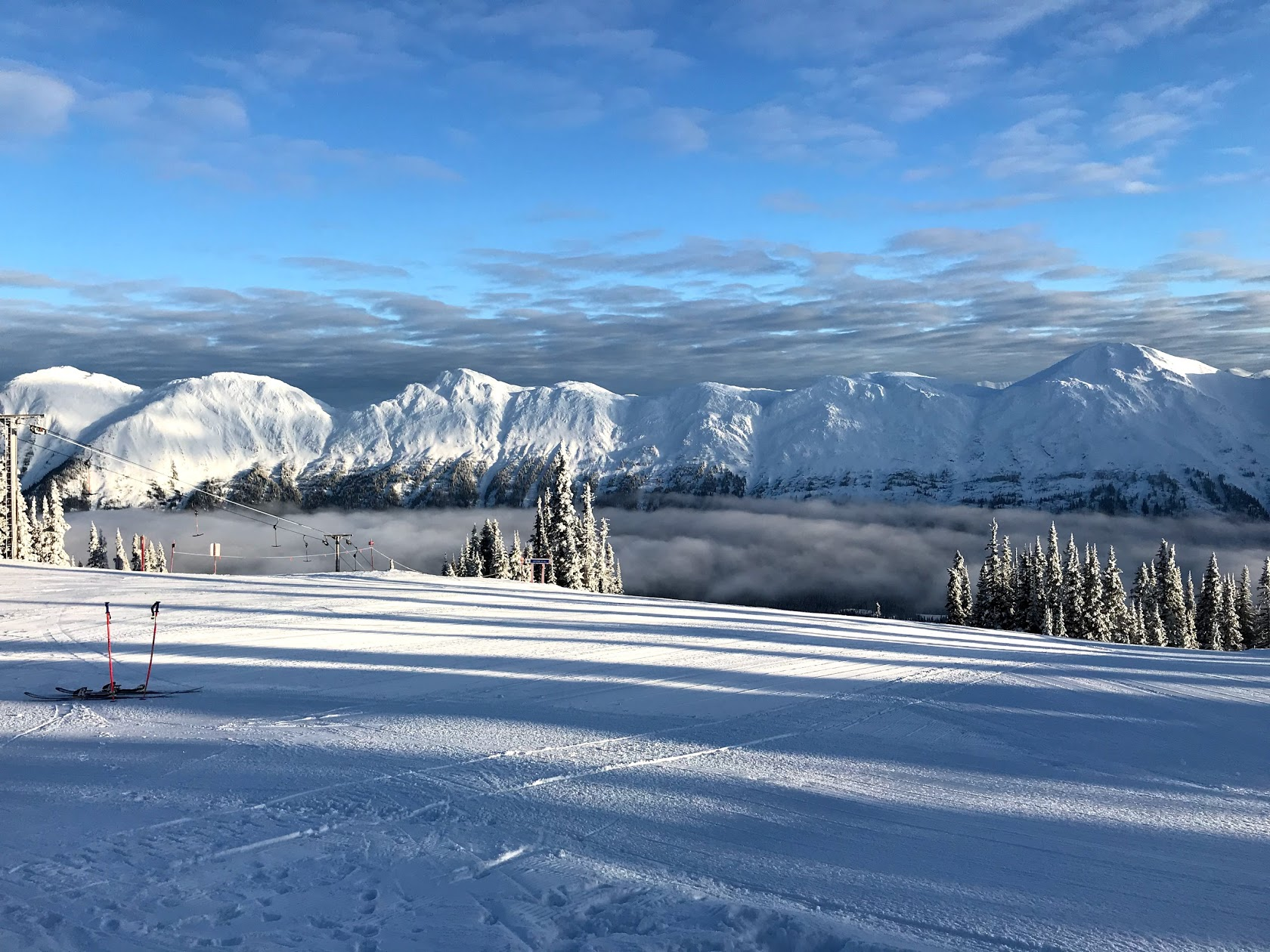
scenery of Powder King BC

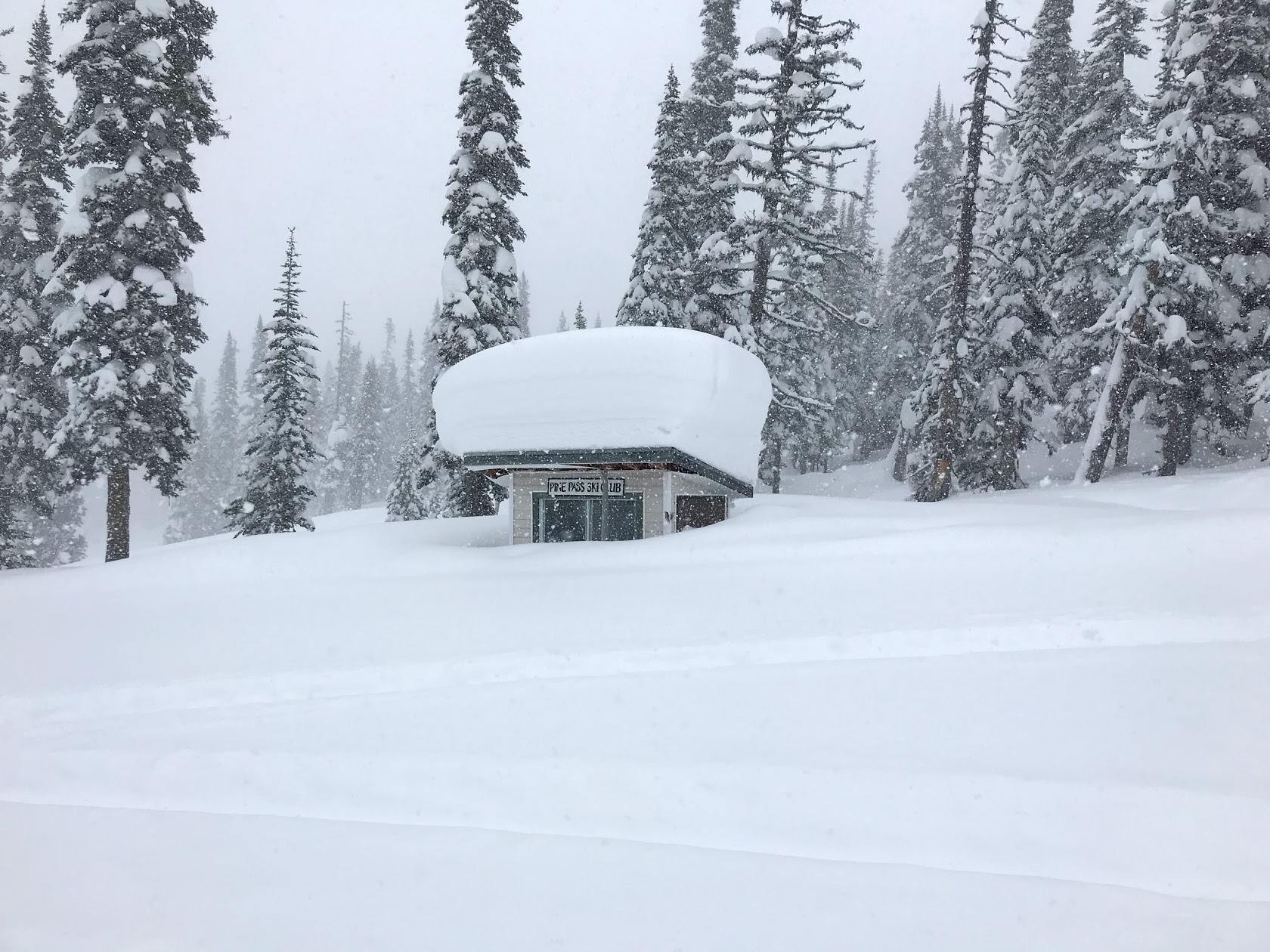
Powder King 1

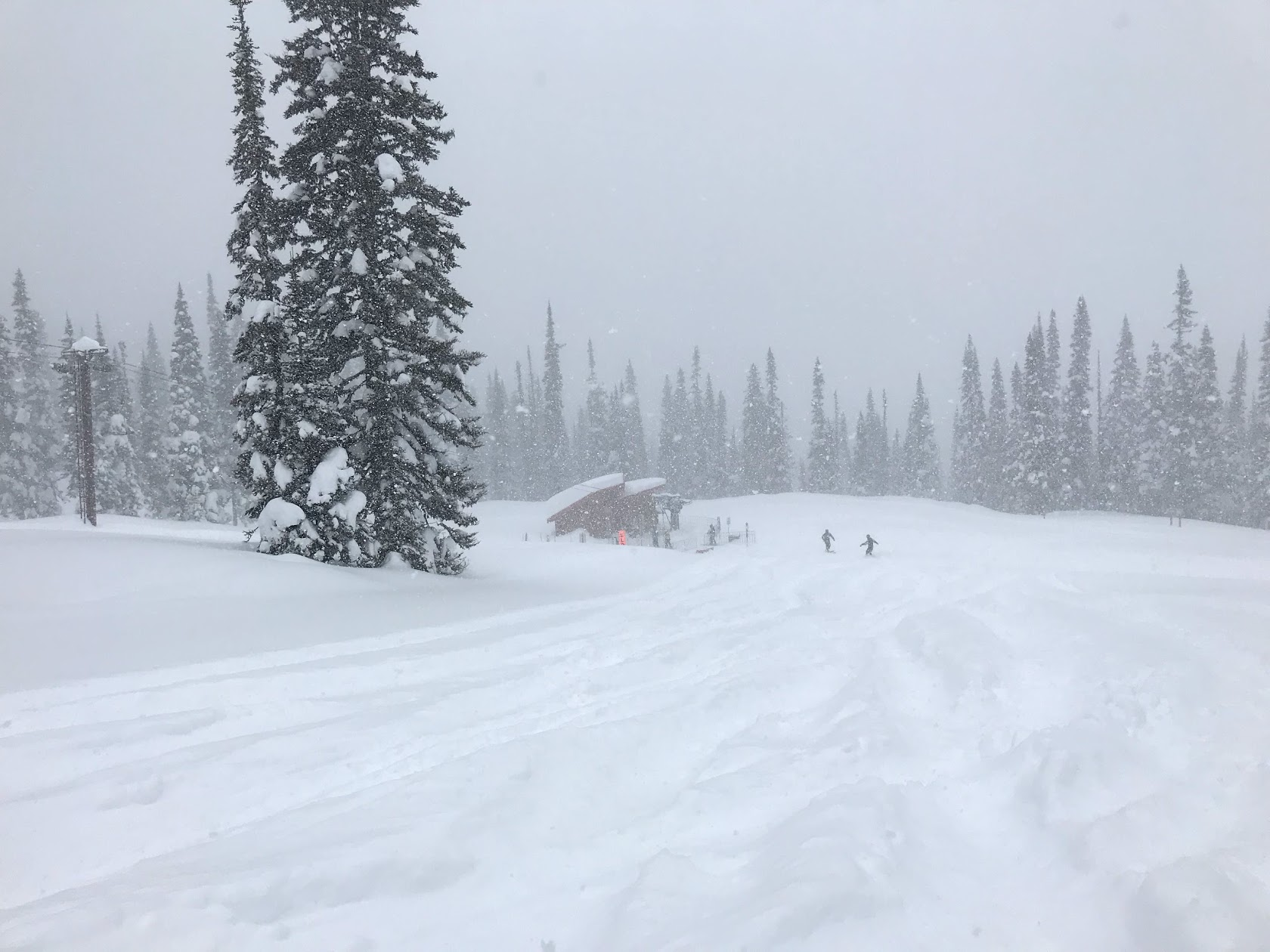
more pow

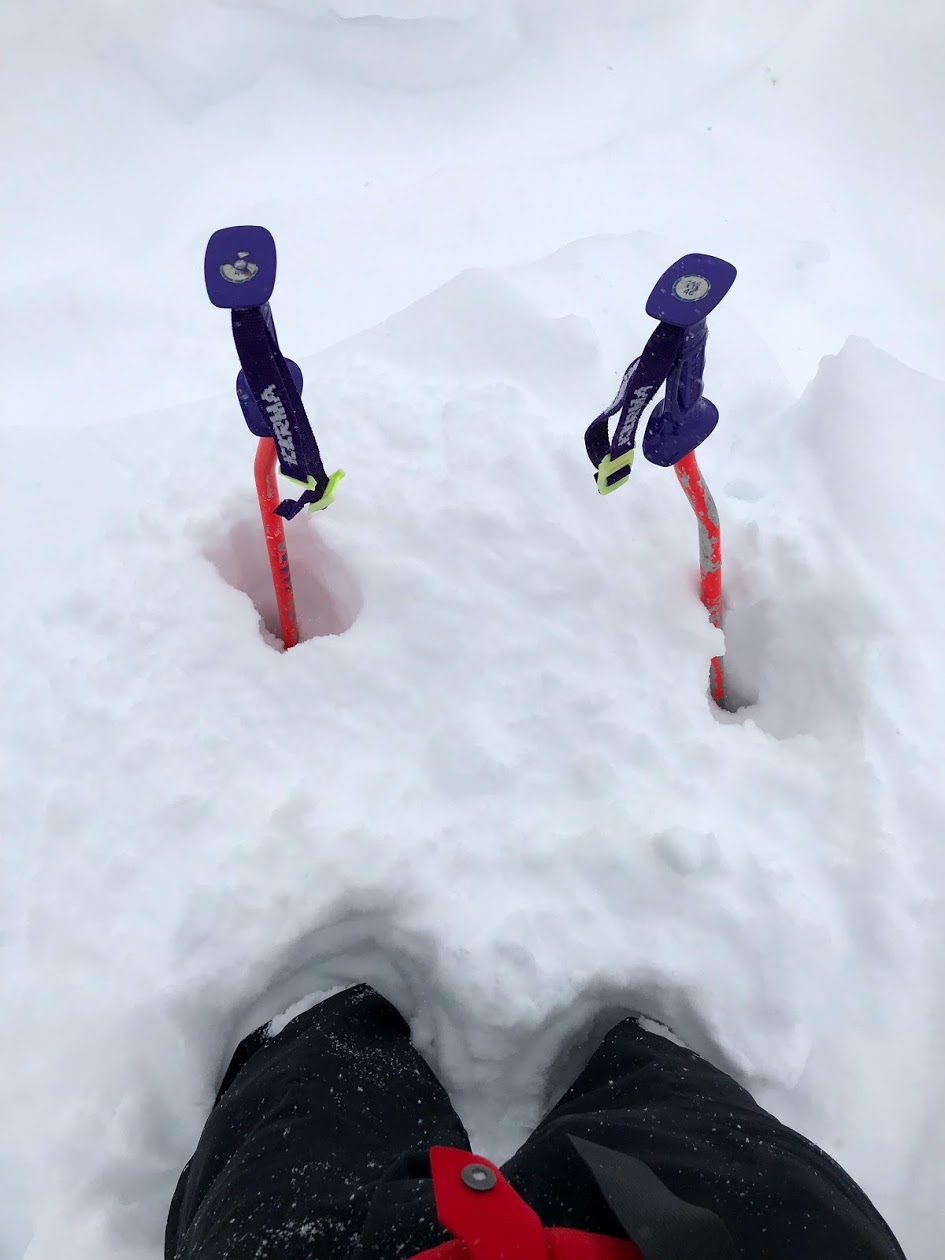
Another Pow! Day at PK

Powder King Mountain Resort, commonly referred to simply as Powder King, is located in the Pine Pass area of the Northern Rockies of British Columbia's Northeastern Interior. Ranked #4 in all of North America for snow, the area boasts the best snow quality of all Canadian ski hills.

Powder King's slopes offer a mix of beginner, intermediate and expert runs, with one three-person chairlift to mid-mountain, one T-bar to the top, and a handle tow at the base to assist and teach beginners. Most of the 37 run names have a Beatles theme (including Upper & Lower Abbey, Octopus’s Garden, Anytime At All, Good Day Sunshine, Twist and Shout, Come Together, Roll Over Beethoven, Nowhere Man, Hard Day’s Night, Hippy Hippy Shake, Ticket to Ride, Paperback Rider (sic), Get Back, Revolution, Let It Be, I Will, Blue Jay Way, Getting Better, Penny Lane, Lovely Rita, and Strawberry Fields).

Originally envisioned as a "Whistler of the North", little of the grandiose plans of various owners came to fruition. Now known for its less crowded and more intimate environment, “Whisper of the North” has become the slogan. The current complex has a full-service restaurant, 35-room ATCO hostel-style hotel, and a small resort community of individual homes and condominiums. Members of the Canadian Ski Patrol regularly keep watch over the hill.

== Transportation ==
All Greyhound busses are now cancelled in B.C.

== History ==
=== Strobl Consortium ===
Opened for the 1965/66 season, the Azu Ski Village added a T-bar lift for 1968/69. A rope tow came the following season. By this time, the village comprised a 60-person capacity day lodge, 50-seat dining room, 80-vehicle parking, motel units and 36-bed dormitory. For 1971/72, the 2,000-foot (615-metre) T-bar lift reached 4,000 feet (1,231 metres).

=== Graham Family ===
In 1979, Kerry O’Connor purchased the operations and proposed a $2 million development, which included a 2,800-foot (862-metre) double chairlift, plus two more T-bars. The 1981 master plan relocated the village one kilometre north to an adjacent site, but it is unclear when O’Connor disposed of his interest. In 1983, Peter Graham Jr., president and majority shareholder in the family-owned company that had operated Azu Village for the previous four years, and Peter's then-wife Claudia, presented a $7.7 million expansion plan. Renamed Powder King Ski Village, the proposal included 14 more ski runs (five existed), a 1,400-metre triple chairlift, a 1,000-metre T-Bar and a 230-metre platter lift for beginners. A real estate development at the base of the mountain would comprise 47 single-family lots and 106 multi-family units. The plan, approved 15 months later by the regional district, also included modular (construction site style) buildings for a restaurant, bar and ski services, two buildings for equipment storage, a gas station and upgrades to existing buildings.

The $4 million first phase was completed for the 1984/85 season. The former T-bar had featured a 360-metre vertical drop and 1,225-metre slope length. The new Doppelmayr triple chair had a vertical drop of 360 metres over 1,296 metres, while the new Doppelmayr T-bar featured a drop of 255 metres over 878 metres, all with a 1,600-skiers-per-hour carrying capacity. On reaching the top of the triple chair, skiers had the option of skiing down a moderate distance to the new T-bar that took riders to just below the tree line. Base facilities included 1,115 square metres of day lodges and a 500-car parking lot. A 60-room hostel opened the following fall.

In 1988, one tender called for the laying of sewer pipes, site grading, an access road and parking lot. Another tender covered the construction of two three-storey clusters of six condominiums.

A proposed $3.3-million second phase expansion included a 3,450-square-metre 80-bed hotel/lodge complex with condominium units, and a residential subdivision entailing 14 single-family cabins. This accommodation was intended to replace the existing facilities nicknamed Chateau ATCO. The former Azu Village lift would augment the other lifts. A month later, the regional district gave initial approval to the plan, but noted concerns over recovering the district loan for the sewer connection if the business failed.

=== Mitchell Syndicate ===
In 1991, a new 669-square-metre day lodge was under construction when a group of seven investors purchased the ski village. Rob Mitchell became the general manager and chief executive officer. The scope of the 1994-96 highway reconstruction included relocating the Powder King turnoff about 60 metres to the south to provide safer highway access, and constructing a snowmobile parking area.

In arrears, the 1983 development loan was restructured in 1994, but continuing in default, the B.C. government placed the business in receivership less than a year later. Arthur Andersen advertised the sale and announced the ski village closure. Carrying about $1 million in debts, a further substantial cash injection was needed to repair and upgrade the equipment. Rick Merton, with local partners Steve Johnson and Gary McIntyre, bid $967,000 for the facility. Failing to arrange financing within the required five business days, North Star Powder Resorts, their partnership, forfeited its $48,000 deposit.

=== Doyle partnership ===
Richard Doyle headed the group tendering the second-place bid of $811,000. Named Powder King Skiing Inc., six of the eight partners were members of the Doyle family. Completing the legal paperwork delayed the resort’s reopening by a few weeks. The facility operated as the Powder King Mountain Resort. The Regional District of Fraser-Fort George supported, but the Prince George City Council opposed, the 1997 Powder King bid for a casino licence. The B.C. government rejected the proposal.

Navigating foggy conditions, a bus owned by the resort hit the tail end of a logging truck backing onto the highway, just north of Salmon Valley. Seven of about 40 passengers on their way to the ski hill sustained minor cuts and abrasions, but one was seriously injured. The truck driver was charged with driving without due care.

=== Salisbury family ===
In 2005, Jim and Heidi Salisbury acquired the business. The early-season skiing conditions enabled the Canadian Olympic ski cross and boardercross teams to practise there for the three seasons from 2007/08, which benefited Canada’s 2010 medal count. During the 2009 summer, the B.C. Job Opportunities Program provided an $850,000 grant, which largely funded out-of-work loggers to brush down all the willow and do some thinning in the lead up to the hill’s silver jubilee.

The 2010/11 season offered eight additional trails, providing 37 different runs. The following season brought a permanent snowboard-cross track, and the resort applied to expand its liquor licence beyond serving dining patrons. Named Wanderer, Explorer and Challenger, three new snowshoe trails opened for 2012/13. In 2016, the company purchased the mothballed Azouzetta Lake Lodge and rebranded it as Cafe 97. The renovated cabins, suites and bunkhouses are available for guests.

In 2022, Powder King Mountain Resort and Cafe 97 was placed on the market for $8,250,000.
