= Declier Creek =

Location
- Country: Canada
- Province: British Columbia
- Regional District: Fraser Fort George

Physical characteristics
- Source
  - location: Azu Mountain
  - coordinates: 55°20′57″N 122°39′1″W
- Mouth
  - location: Atunatche Creek
  - coordinates: 55°20′39″N 122°35′49″W
- Length: 5.1 km (3.2 mi)

Basin features
- River system: Parsnip River Watershed

Declier Creek is a small river in the Hart Ranges of the Northern Rockies of British Columbia.

== Tributaries ==
- Annie Creek
