= Tuscarora Gas Pipeline =

Gas Pipeline

Tuscarora Gas Pipeline is a 20-inch (51 cm) natural gas pipeline that connects to Gas Transmission Northwest at Malin, Oregon and runs 229 miles (369 km) to Wadsworth, Nevada it delivers natural gas sourced from Alberta, Canada, and is owned by Tuscarora Gas Transmission Company which in turn is 100% owned by TC PipeLines, LP.

== History ==
The pipeline was built for $130 million and opened in 1995. It was owned by Tuscarora Gas Transmission Company which in turn was owned by Sierra Pacific Resources (SPC) and TransCanada Corporation. The revegetation project used all native plant seed that was harvested locally, mixed then spread to cover the right of way for the pipe. Sierra Pacific Resources announced on July 10, 2006, that it is considering selling its interest in the pipeline. TC PipeLines, LP acquired the remaining interest in Tuscarora from SPC in 2007 and 2008.
