= Annie Creek (South Dakota) =

Stream in South Dakota, U.S.

Coordinates: 44°19′38″N 103°53′35″W

Annie Creek is a stream in the U.S. state of South Dakota.

Annie Creek has the name of Annie Clark, the daughter of a pioneer settler.

== See also ==
- List of rivers of South Dakota
