= Malin Airport =

- IATA: none; ICAO: FAA: 4S7

Summary
- Airport type: Public
- Operator: City of Malin
- Location: Malin, Oregon
- Elevation AMSL: 1,634 ft / 498 m
- Coordinates: 42°00′03.5600″N 121°23′46.97″W
- Interactive map of Malin Airport

Runways
Direction	Length		Surface
Direction	ft	m	Surface
14/32	2,800	853	Asphalt/gravel

Malin Airport (FAA LID: 4S7), is a public airport 1 mile (1.6 km) southeast of Malin in Klamath County, in the U.S. state of Oregon.
