= French ship Le Malin =

Four ships of the French Navy have borne the name Le Malin ("clever one" in French, or alternatively "the naughty" or "the devil").

- A cutter (1780–1786)
- A cutter (1795–1803)
- French destroyer Le Malin, a large destroyer of the Le Fantasque class (1931–1964)
- French ship Le Malin (A616) is a support ship from which the Commando Hubert operates.
