= Malin, Oregon =

- City
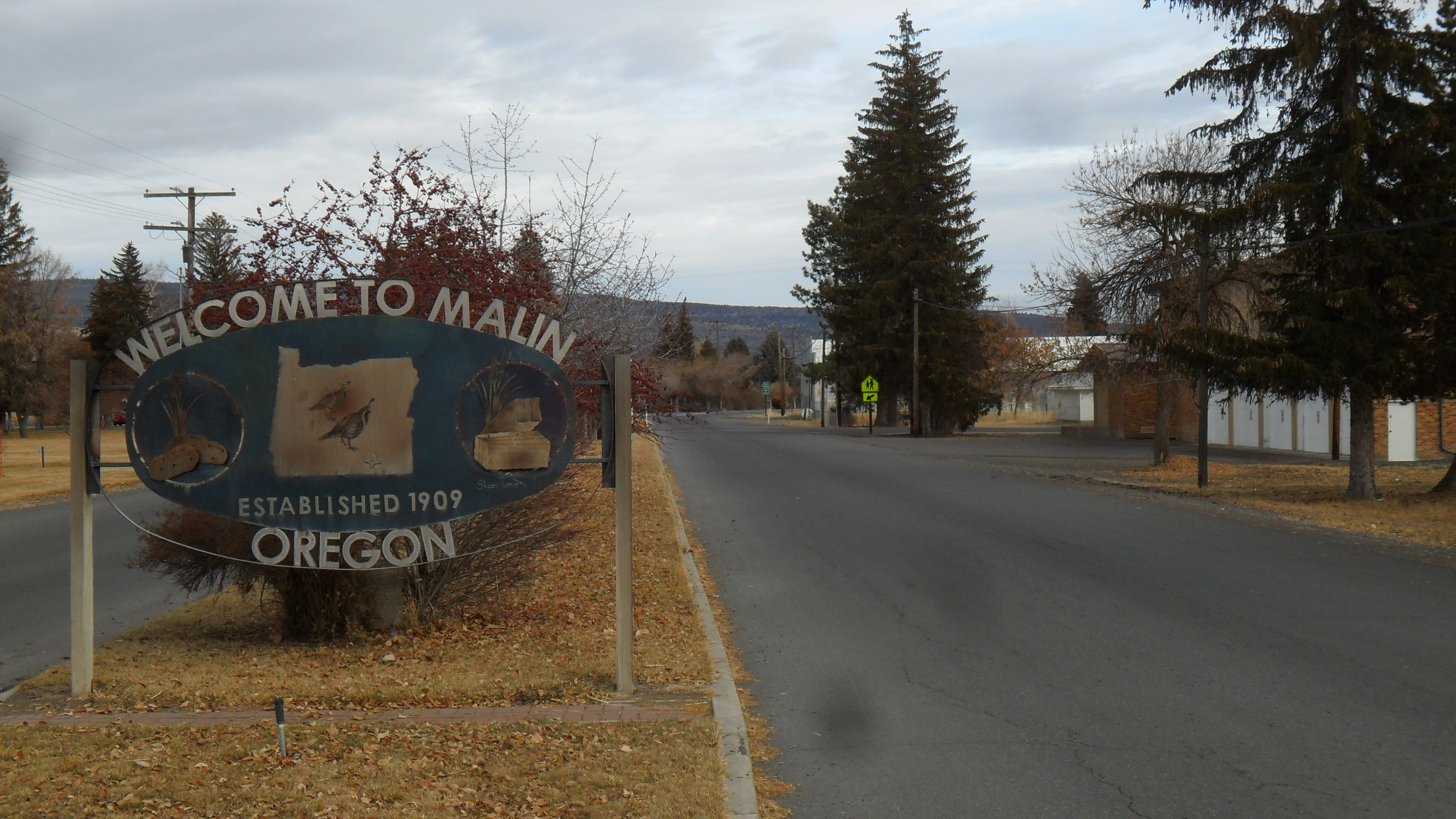
- Malin city sign on Klamath Falls-Malin Highway

- Seal

- Location in Oregon
- Coordinates: 42°00′48″N 121°24′35″W
- Country: United States
- State: Oregon
- County: Klamath
- Incorporated: 1922

Area
  - Total: 0.50 sq mi (1.29 km^{2})
  - Land: 0.50 sq mi (1.29 km^{2})
  - Water: 0 sq mi (0.00 km^{2})
- Elevation: 4,062 ft (1,238 m)

Population (2020)
  - Total: 731
  - Density: 1,464.3/sq mi (565.36/km^{2})
- Time zone: UTC-8 (Pacific)
  - Summer (DST): UTC-7 (Pacific)
- ZIP code: 97632
- Area codes: 458 and 541
- FIPS code: 41-45400
- GNIS feature ID: 2410914
- Website: cityofmalin.org

Malin is a city in Klamath County, Oregon, United States. As of the 2020 census, Malin had a population of 731.

== History ==
According to Lewis A. McArthur, Malin was settled September 30, 1909, on land that was formerly at the bottom of Tule Lake by 65 Bohemian families who named the new town for the Czech town of Malín, now part of Kutná Hora. The settlers had found a large horseradish, and Malin is famous for that plant. McArthur also alludes to the discovery of fossils near Malin in 1925. Many surviving descendants of these original Czech families still call Malin home, maintaining family farms.

== Geography ==
Malin is at an elevation of 4,062 feet (1,238 m) in southern Klamath County near the Oregon–California border. It is along a spur of Oregon Route 39, southeast of Klamath Falls, east of Merrill, and northeast of Tulelake. Lava Beds National Monument is to the south, nearby in California. By highway, the city is 30 miles (48 km) from Klamath Falls and 309 miles (497 km) from Portland.

According to the United States Census Bureau, the city has a total area of 0.50 square miles (1.29 km^{2}), all of it land.

== Climate ==
This region experiences warm (but not hot) and dry summers, with no average monthly temperatures above 71.6 °F (22.0 °C). According to the Köppen Climate Classification system, Malin has a warm-summer Mediterranean climate, abbreviated Csb on climate maps. Due to its relatively aridity, Malin nearly qualifies as having a steppe climate (Köppen: BSk)

Climate data for Malin
Month	Jan	Feb	Mar	Apr	May	Jun	Jul	Aug	Sep	Oct	Nov	Dec	Year
Record high °F (°C)	64 (18)	76 (24)	76 (24)	83 (28)	93 (34)	97 (36)	102 (39)	102 (39)	98 (37)	88 (31)	74 (23)	62 (17)	102 (39)
Mean daily maximum °F (°C)	40.7 (4.8)	45.1 (7.3)	49.1 (9.5)	56.2 (13.4)	66.1 (18.9)	74.5 (23.6)	82.9 (28.3)	82.1 (27.8)	74.5 (23.6)	62.7 (17.1)	47 (8)	40.1 (4.5)	60.1 (15.6)
Mean daily minimum °F (°C)	22 (−6)	25.3 (−3.7)	27.3 (−2.6)	30.8 (−0.7)	37 (3)	43.6 (6.4)	48.7 (9.3)	47.8 (8.8)	41.8 (5.4)	34.9 (1.6)	27.1 (−2.7)	21.9 (−5.6)	34 (1)
Record low °F (°C)	−5 (−21)	−18 (−28)	−5 (−21)	9 (−13)	18 (−8)	25 (−4)	29 (−2)	29 (−2)	23 (−5)	7 (−14)	−3 (−19)	−20 (−29)	−20 (−29)
Average precipitation inches (mm)	1.4 (36)	1.1 (28)	1.56 (40)	1.06 (27)	1.16 (29)	0.84 (21)	0.31 (7.9)	0.5 (13)	0.63 (16)	0.99 (25)	1.44 (37)	1.42 (36)	12.43 (316)
Average snowfall inches (cm)	5.1 (13)	4.7 (12)	2.8 (7.1)	1.5 (3.8)	0.7 (1.8)	0 (0)	0 (0)	0 (0)	0 (0)	0.5 (1.3)	3.4 (8.6)	7 (18)	25.7 (65)
Average precipitation days	8	7	9	7	6	4	2	2	3	5	9	9	71

== Demographics ==
Historical population
Census	Pop.	Note	%±
1920	110		—
1930	215		95.5%
1940	535		148.8%
1950	592		10.7%
1960	568		−4.1%
1970	486		−14.4%
1980	539		10.9%
1990	725		34.5%
2000	638		−12.0%
2010	805		26.2%
2020	731		−9.2%
Source: U.S. Decennial Census

=== 2020 census ===
As of the 2020 census, Malin had a population of 731. The median age was 38.5 years. 23.8% of residents were under the age of 18 and 15.6% of residents were 65 years of age or older. For every 100 females there were 107.7 males, and for every 100 females age 18 and over there were 107.1 males age 18 and over.

The 2020 census reported 0% of residents lived in urban areas, while 100.0% lived in rural areas.

There were 259 households in Malin, of which 42.1% had children under the age of 18 living in them. Of all households, 49.4% were married-couple households, 20.1% were households with a male householder and no spouse or partner present, and 22.0% were households with a female householder and no spouse or partner present. About 20.0% of all households were made up of individuals and 12.0% had someone living alone who was 65 years of age or older.

There were 277 housing units, of which 6.5% were vacant. Among occupied housing units, 60.2% were owner-occupied and 39.8% were renter-occupied. The homeowner vacancy rate was <0.1% and the rental vacancy rate was 6.4%.

Racial composition as of the 2020 census
Race	Number	Percentage
White	358	49.0%
Black or African American	1	0.1%
American Indian and Alaska Native	20	2.7%
Asian	0	0%
Native Hawaiian and Other Pacific Islander	1	0.1%
Some other race	258	35.3%
Two or more races	93	12.7%
Hispanic or Latino (of any race)	385	52.7%

=== 2010 census ===
As of the census of 2010, there were 805 people, 255 households, and 194 families residing in the city. The population density was 1,610.0 inhabitants per square mile (621.6/km^{2}). There were 278 housing units at an average density of 556.0 per square mile (214.7/km^{2}). The racial makeup of the city was 70.6% White, 1.1% Native American, 25.7% from other races, and 2.6% from two or more races. Hispanic or Latino of any race were 57.8% of the population.

There were 255 households, of which 49.4% had children under the age of 18 living with them, 57.6% were married couples living together, 11.8% had a female householder with no husband present, 6.7% had a male householder with no wife present, and 23.9% were non-families. 19.2% of all households were made up of individuals, and 8.6% had someone living alone who was 65 years of age or older. The average household size was 3.16 and the average family size was 3.66.

The median age in the city was 29.1 years. 33.3% of residents were under the age of 18; 12.3% were between the ages of 18 and 24; 24.6% were from 25 to 44; 19.1% were from 45 to 64; and 10.7% were 65 years of age or older. The gender makeup of the city was 52.5% male and 47.5% female.

=== 2000 census ===
As of the census of 2000, there were 638 people, 200 households, and 155 families residing in the city. The population density was 1,810.4 inhabitants per square mile (699.0/km^{2}). There were 217 housing units at an average density of 615.8 per square mile (237.8/km^{2}). The racial makeup of the city was 63.32% White, 0.63% African American, 2.19% Native American, 0.63% Pacific Islander, 31.03% from other races. About 2% were of two or more races. About 54% were Hispanic or Latino of any race.

There were 200 households, out of which 48.5% had children under the age of 18 living with them, 58.5% were married couples living together, 10.5% had a female householder with no husband present, 22.5% were non-families. Twenty percent of all households were made up of individuals. About 10% had someone living alone who was 65 years of age or older.

The average household size was 3.19 and the average family size was 3.61. The age distribution was 36.4% under the age of 18, 9.9% from 18 to 24, 27.4% from 25 to 44, 16.5% from 45 to 64, and 9.9% who were 65 years of age or older. The median age was 28 years. For every 100 females, there were 109.2 males. For every 100 females age 18 and over, there were 106.1 males.

The median income for a household in the city was $29,750, and the median income for a family was $30,000. Males had a median income of $26,875 versus $21,591 for females. The per capita income for the city was $10,258. About 19.4% of families and 26.7% of the population were below the poverty line, including 38.1% of those under age 18 and none of those age 65 or over.

== Economy and infrastructure ==
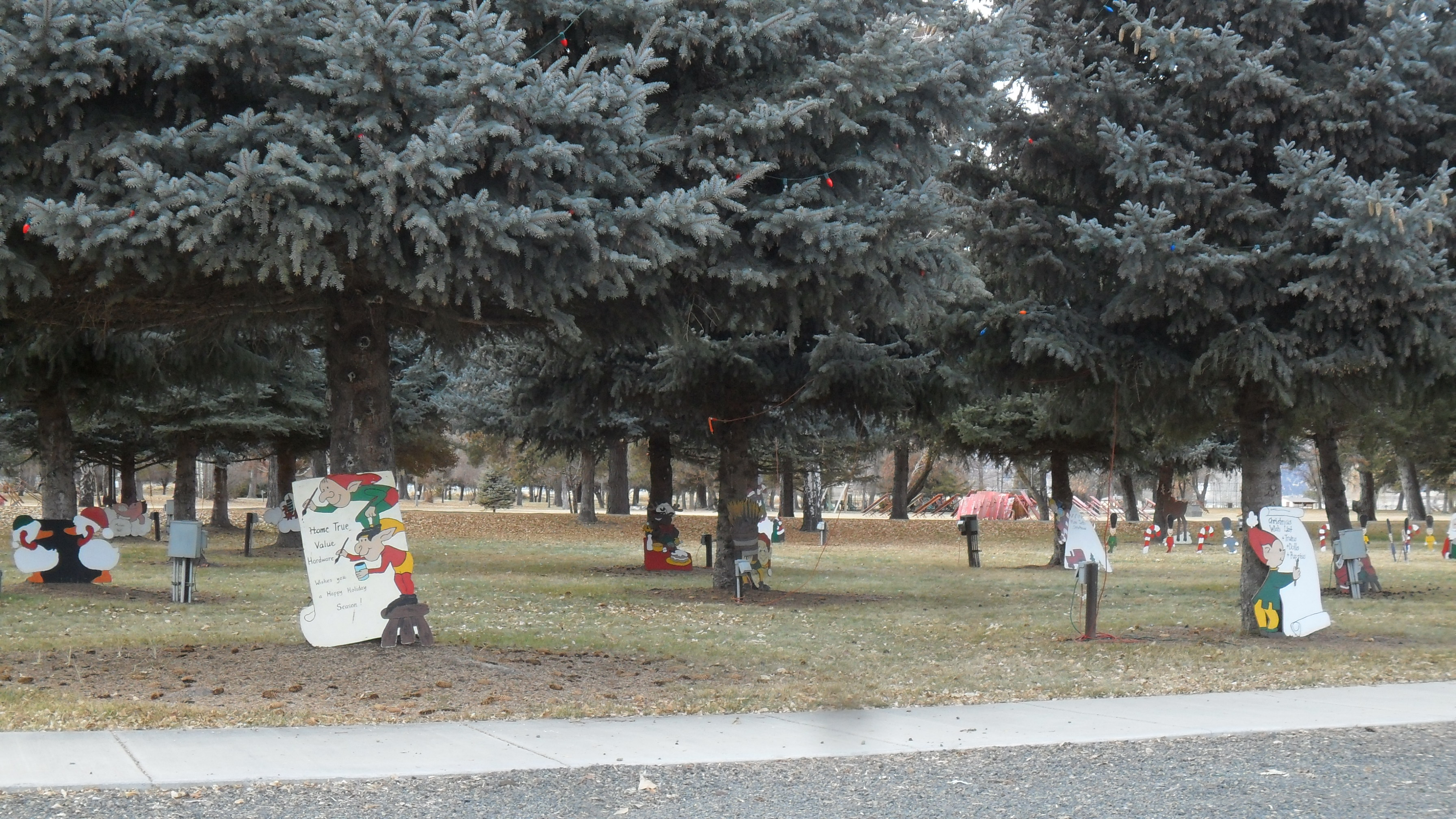
Malin city park on the northwest corner of town

As of 2002, the three largest employers in Malin were the Circle C (potato shed), Baley Troutman (farm), and Cy's Market (grocery store).

The "Malin Substation", an electrical substation owned by PG&E, PacifiCorp, and BPA, forms the northern end of Path 66, a major north-south power transmission corridor.

Near Malin are several natural gas interconnects: The Malin Interconnect connects Gas Transmission Northwest with Pacific Gas & Electric's Redwood Path. The Onyx Hills interconnect connects the Ruby Pipeline with Pacific Gas & Electric's Redwood Path. The third interconnect is between the Tuscarora and GTN. If built, the Pacific Connector Gas Pipeline would connect this nexus of natural gas facilities to the future Jordan Cove LNG terminal.

=== Transportation ===
- Malin Airport

== Education ==
It is within the Klamath County School District.

It is in the territory of Klamath Community College.
