= Pembina Pipeline =

Canadian petroleum company

Pembina Pipeline Corporation
- Type: Public
- Traded as: TSX: PPL; NYSE: PBA; S&P/TSX 60 component
- Industry: Petroleum industry Pipeline transport Storage
- Founded: September 24, 1954
- Headquarters: Calgary, Canada
- Key people: Scott Burrows President & CEO; Henry W. Sykes Chairman
- Products: Ethylene and Oil Storage; Natural gas
- Revenue: ▼CA$9.125 billion (2023)
- Operating income: ▼CA$2.655 billion (2023)
- Net income: ▼CA$1.776 billion (2023)
- Total assets: ▲CA$32.618 billion (2023)
- Total equity: ▲CA$15.813 billion (2023)
- Number of employees: 2837 (2023)
- Divisions: Pembina Marketing Ltd; Syncrude pipeline Horizon Pipeline
- Website: www.pembina.com

Pembina Pipeline is a Canadian corporation that operates transportation and storage infrastructure that delivers oil and natural gas to and from parts of Western Canada. Since 2003, this has included ethylene storage at one location. Western Canada is the source of all products transported by Pembina pipeline systems, which include the Syncrude pipeline, Horizon pipeline, and Cheecham oilsands pipelines.

Pembina Pipeline Corporation became an income fund (trust) in 1997, joining the Toronto Stock Exchange with an IPO of $600 million. On October 1, 2010, it converted to a public corporation and changed its official name from Pembina Pipeline Income Fund to Pembina Pipeline Corporation. As of 2023, the company had more than 2,837 employees.

== History ==
The company can be traced back to 1954 when the Pembina pipeline system was built to serve the Pembina oil field in the Drayton Valley region. For the next 37 years, the company's main operations were centred on oil delivery to Edmonton using the Pembina pipeline.

The company made its first acquisition, Peace Pipe Line Ltd., in 1991. Five years later, it bought half of the Bonnie Glen System, a 250 km-long network serving oil fields in central Alberta. Inter Pipeline Fund, the leading transporter of oilsands bitumen, was also established in 1997.

Three years later in 2000, Pembina took over Federated Pipe Lines Ltd. in a $340 million deal from a group headed by Imperial Oil (Pembina needed to use a $420 million credit facility). After the takeover, Pembina's network in Western Canada was 7,000 km long and transported nearly 550,000 b/d of oil and natural gas.

In 2001, Pembina sold a salt cavern in Hardisty to Canadian Crude Separators Inc., and acquired 100 percent of the main Syncrude pipeline by taking over its operator, Alberta Oil Sands Pipeline Ltd. for $225 million. The buyout of Alberta Oil Sands Pipeline was instrumental in Pembina's growth by giving them access to a number of large oil and gas customers, including Imperial Oil, Conoco Oil, Nexen, and Petro-Canada.

On June 24, 2003, Pembina bought 50 percent of an ethylene storage facility in Fort Saskatchewan for $185 million from NOVA Chemicals Corp, the other 50 per cent owned by Dow Chemical Canada.

On June 2, 2009, Pembina acquired the Cutbank Complex from a Talisman Energy subsidiary for $300 million in cash (provided by a credit facility).

In 2012, Pembina purchased Provident Energy, a Canadian company, for $3.1 billion in stock. In 2017, it purchased rival energy infrastructure corporation Veresen, for $9.7 billion. At the time, Veresen was primarily a natural gas transportation company, while Pembina focused on transporting oil and other liquids.

In 2019, Pembina purchased Kinder Morgan Canada Limited, along with a portion of the Cochin pipeline, for $4.35 billion.

In 2024, Pembina purchased the remaining 50% of Alliance Pipeline from Enbridge along with an additional 42.7% of the Aux Sable gas processing facility.

== Operations ==
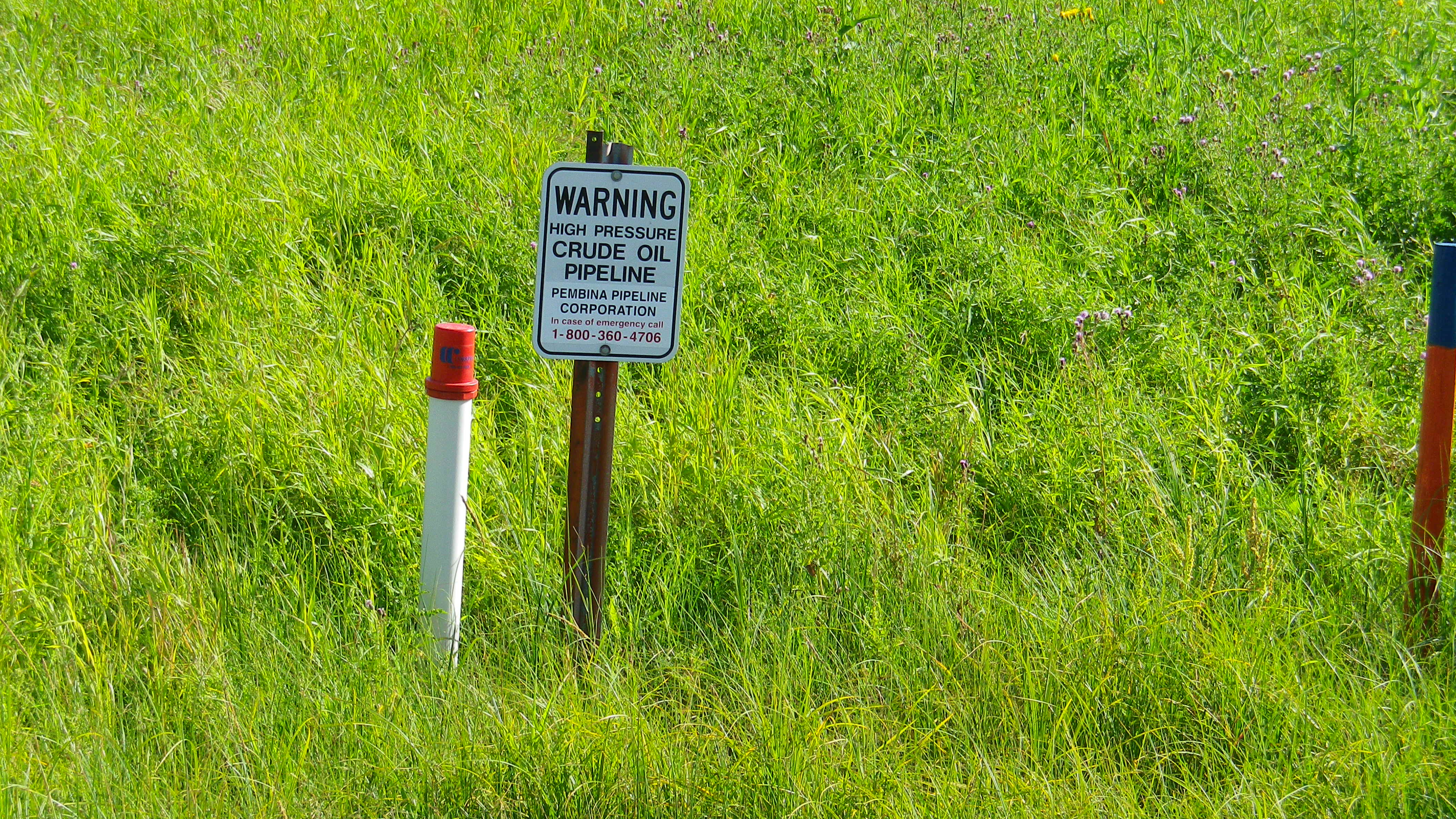
Pembina high pressure crude oil pipeline marker

Operations are segmented into three main areas: (1) infrastructure for transporting conventional oil, (2) infrastructure for transporting oil sands and heavy oil, and (3) services related to storage and logistics (terminals, hubs, and midstreams), as well as marketing.

=== Conventional oil infrastructure ===
These operations oversee pipelines in British Columbia and Alberta that transport crude oil and natural gas liquids. There are two main systems: the Alberta System and the BC System.

The Alberta System wholly owns and runs three systems (all in operation since the 1950s), the largest of which is the Peace System (2009), and owns 50% of another, the Glen System (shared with Keyera Energy), and has a 10% interest in the Wabasca Oil Field System. Equal Energy Ltd is one of many minor producers that use the peace pipeline. Equal's 16 wells near Grande Prairie, Alberta, deliver oil to the system.

BC System, 100% owned, has been in operation since 1960, and encompasses 3 storing facilities. The crude oil pipelines run in northeastern BC and connect Taylor to Kamloops. The total capacity is half of the smallest Alberta pipeline system (80,000 b/d in May 2009).

=== Oil sands and heavy oil infrastructure ===
These operations manage pipelines (and their associated facilities) used to transport synthetic crude from upgrading facilities. The division oversees the Syncrude pipeline, Cheechan pipeline (operating since 2006), and Horizon pipeline (operating 2008). All three have long-term contracts (over 20 years). Syncrude represents half of the total design capacity.

Horizon serves Canadian Natural Resources at their most important synthetic oil-producing area. (For the Horizon project, the contract is for 25 years).

=== Midstream and marketing ===
This consists of Pembina's storage and terminal business. 18% of revenue comes from storage and related services not connected with the Cutbank Complex and Ethylene storage.

Cutbank consists of three gas plants (Cutbank, Musreau, and Kakwa River), nine compressor stations, and a 300 km-long system that gathers and processes natural gas liquids. Kakwa is 50% owned by Pembina but operated by another company.

Ethylene Storage 50% is an underground operation. The contract runs until 2023 and is operated by Dow Chemicals. Dow Chemicals along with Nova Chemicals Corp (the company from which Pembina bought its interest in 2003) are the biggest customers.
