= Malin (surname) =

Malin is a surname. Notable people with the surname include:

- Andreas Malin, Liechtenstein footballer
- David Malin, British-Australian astronomer and photographer
- Edward Malin, British actor
- Jesse Malin, front-man for New York City hardcore band Heart Attack
- Joanne Malin, British TV journalist
- Marilyn Malin (1935 or 1936 to 2022), British literary agent, editor and publisher
- Markus Malin, Finnish snowboarder
- Michael C. Malin, American astronomer and space scientist
