= Malin Wollin =

Swedish journalist, writer and blogger

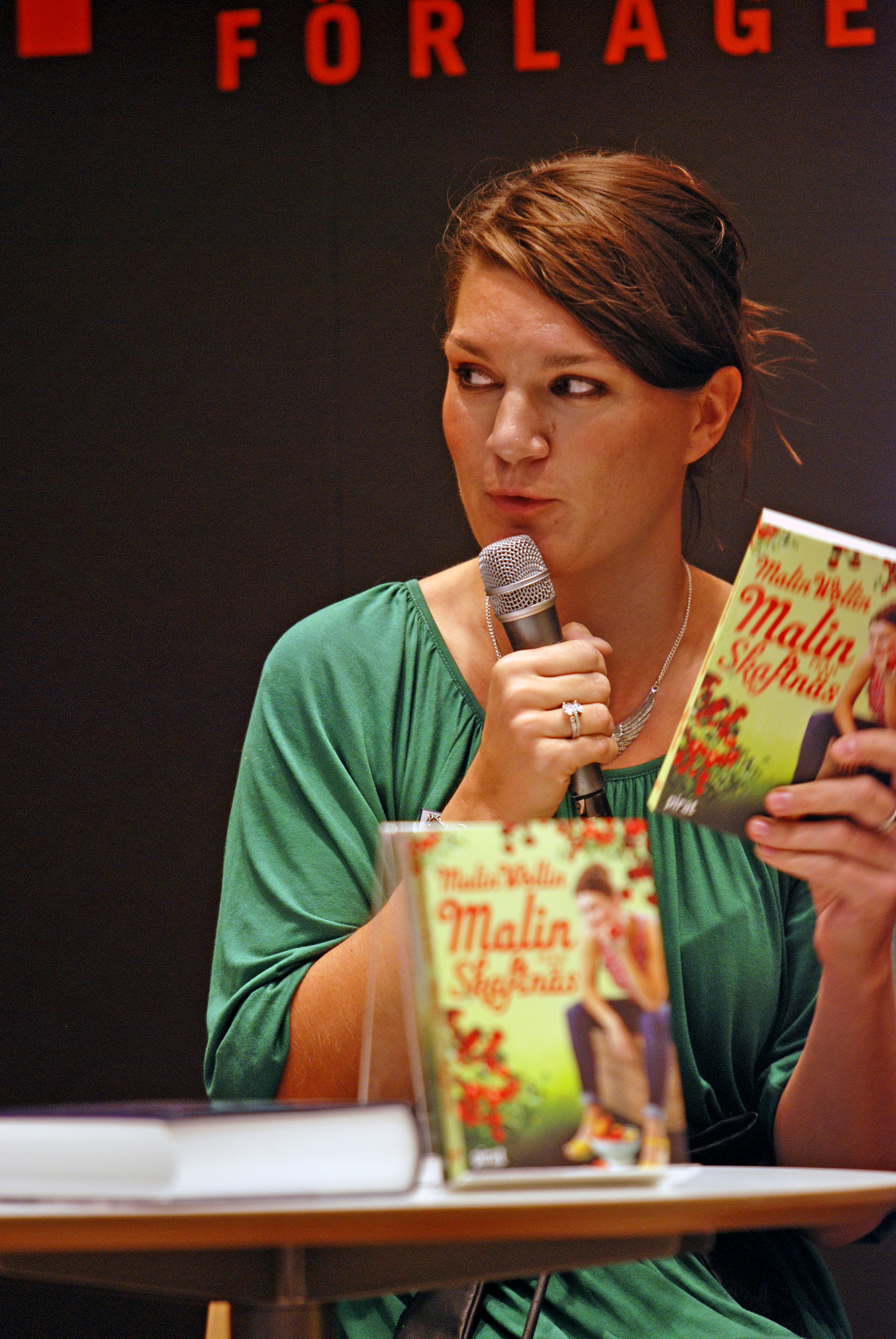
Malin Wollin (2011)

Malin Wollin (born 8 December 1978) is a Swedish journalist, writer and blogger. She writes chronicles for Aftonbladet and for the magazine Mama. She also has the blog "Fotbollsfrun" (en:"Footballers wife"), at Aftonbladets website. In 2008, she was nominated as "Chronicle writer of the Year" for a gala to be held at Cirkus in Stockholm. She is in a relationship with former footballer Joachim Lantz who has played for Kalmar FF, Mjällby AIF and Östers IF. The couple has four children together and resides in Kalmar.

== Bibliography ==
- Ser min röv lång ut i den här? (2007)
- Fotbollsfrun (2008)
- Malin från Skaftnäs (2011)
