= Gas Transmission Northwest =

Gas Transmission Northwest (GTN) is a 1,353 miles (2,177 km) long natural gas pipeline built in 1961 with a capacity of 2,900 million cubic feet per day. It brings gas from Alberta, Canada, beginning at Kingsgate, British Columbia and passing through Washington and terminates at Malin, Oregon then connecting to California, connecting to the Pacific Gas and Electric system. Prior to being purchased by TransCanada Corporation in 2004, it was named Pacific Gas Transmission. TransCanada subsequently sold 25 percent of its interest in GTN to TC PipeLines, LP, which connects via the Tuscarora Gas Pipeline. GTN's FERC code is 86.

== See also ==
- List of North American natural gas pipelines
