= Azouzetta Lake =

Lake in British Columbia, Canada

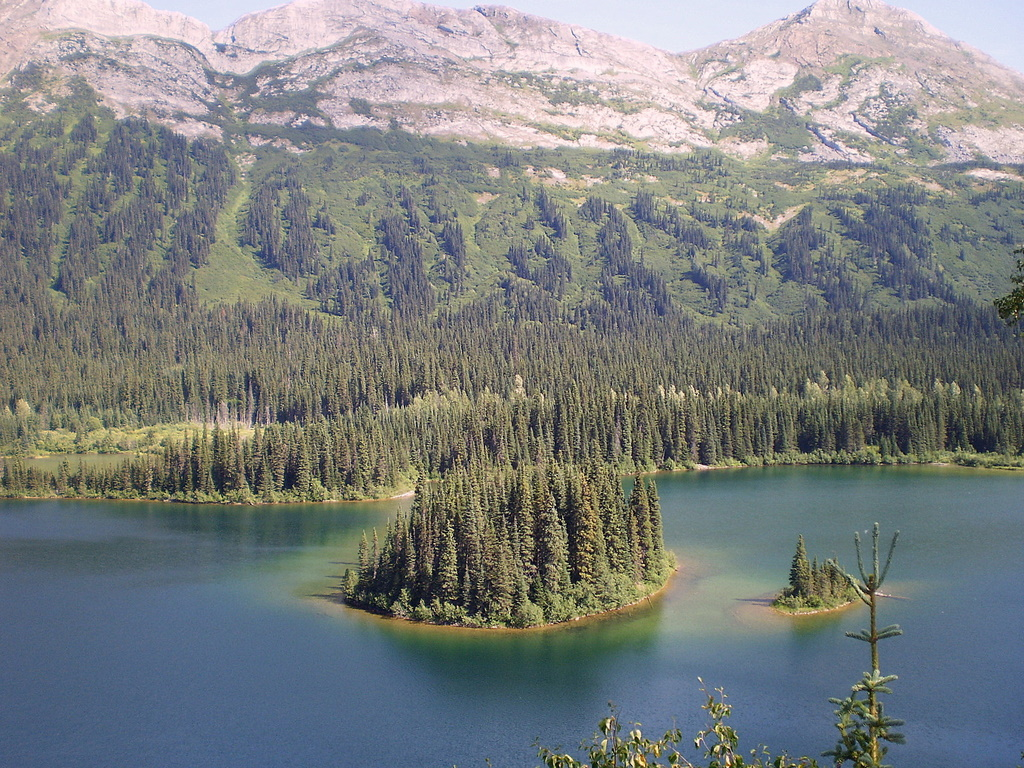

- Location within British Columbia
- Location: British Columbia
- Coordinates: 55°23′16″N 122°36′49″W
- Type: Lake
- Part of: Peace River Watershed
- Primary outflows: Atunatche Creek
- Surface area: 1.37 km^{2} (0.53 sq mi)
- Max. depth: 25 m (82 ft)
- Water volume: 18,452,861 m^{3} (651,656,600 ft^{3})
- Shore length^{1}: 8.22 km (5.11 mi)
- Surface elevation: 876 m (2,874 ft)
- Islands: 5
- ^{1} Shore length is not a well-defined measure.

Azouzetta Lake, elevation 876 m (2,874 ft), is a lake in the Hart Ranges of the Northern Rockies of British Columbia. The lake is situated adjacent the Pine Le Moray Provincial Park.

The lake has been referred by different names within historical documents, from Summit Lake in 1870–80, to Pollen Lake in 1907 and finally Azzouzetta (Summit Lake) in 1917.

== See also ==
- List of lakes of British Columbia
