= Natural gas pipeline system in the United States =

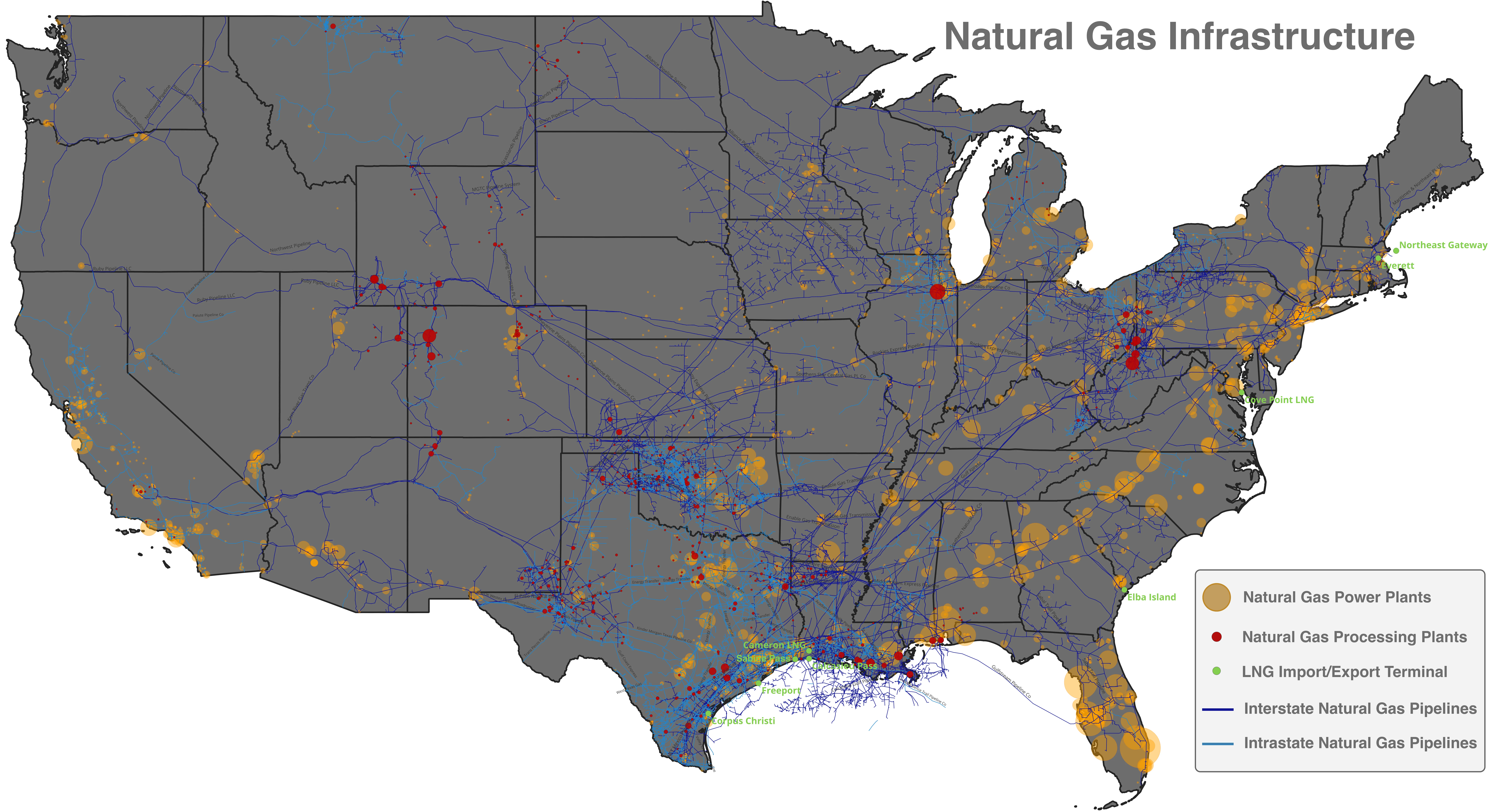
Natural gas infrastructure in the United States Interstate pipelines Intrastate pipelines

The US natural gas pipeline system is a complex system of pipelines that carries natural gas nationwide and for import and export for use by millions of people daily for their consumer and commercial needs. Across the country, there are more than 210 pipeline systems that total more than 305,000 miles of interstate and intrastate pipelines.

Of the lower 48 US states, those with the most natural gas pipeline running through them are Texas (58,588 miles), Louisiana (18,900), Oklahoma (18,539), Kansas (15,386), Illinois (11,900) and California (11,770). The states with the least natural gas pipeline are Vermont and New Hampshire.

== Regulation ==
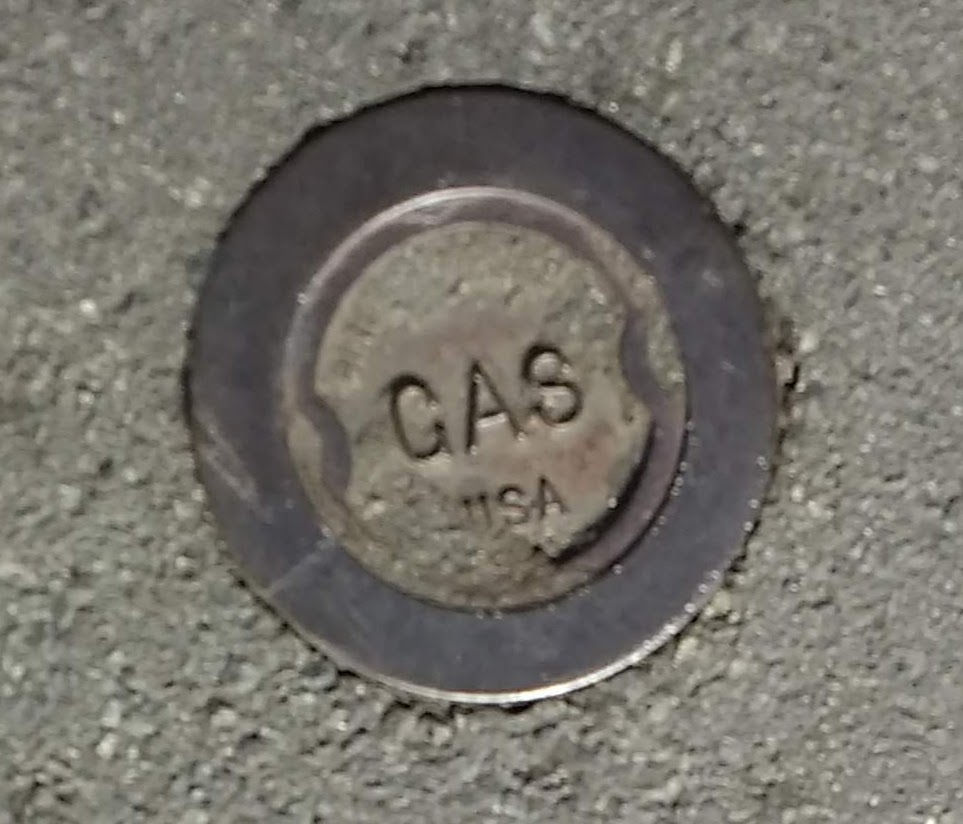
A gas valve cover in Boston, Massachusetts.

The US DOT Office of Pipeline Safety (OPS) administers the national regulatory program to assure the safe and environmentally sound transportation of natural gas, liquefied natural gas and hazardous liquids by pipeline. The Federal Energy Regulatory Commission reviews and authorizes the operation of the interstate natural gas pipelines. Intrastate pipelines that run within one state and do not cross state boundaries are typically regulated by a state government agency. For example, in Texas, the Railroad Commission of Texas regulates pipelines, and in Louisiana, it is the Louisiana Department of Natural Resources.

== Development ==
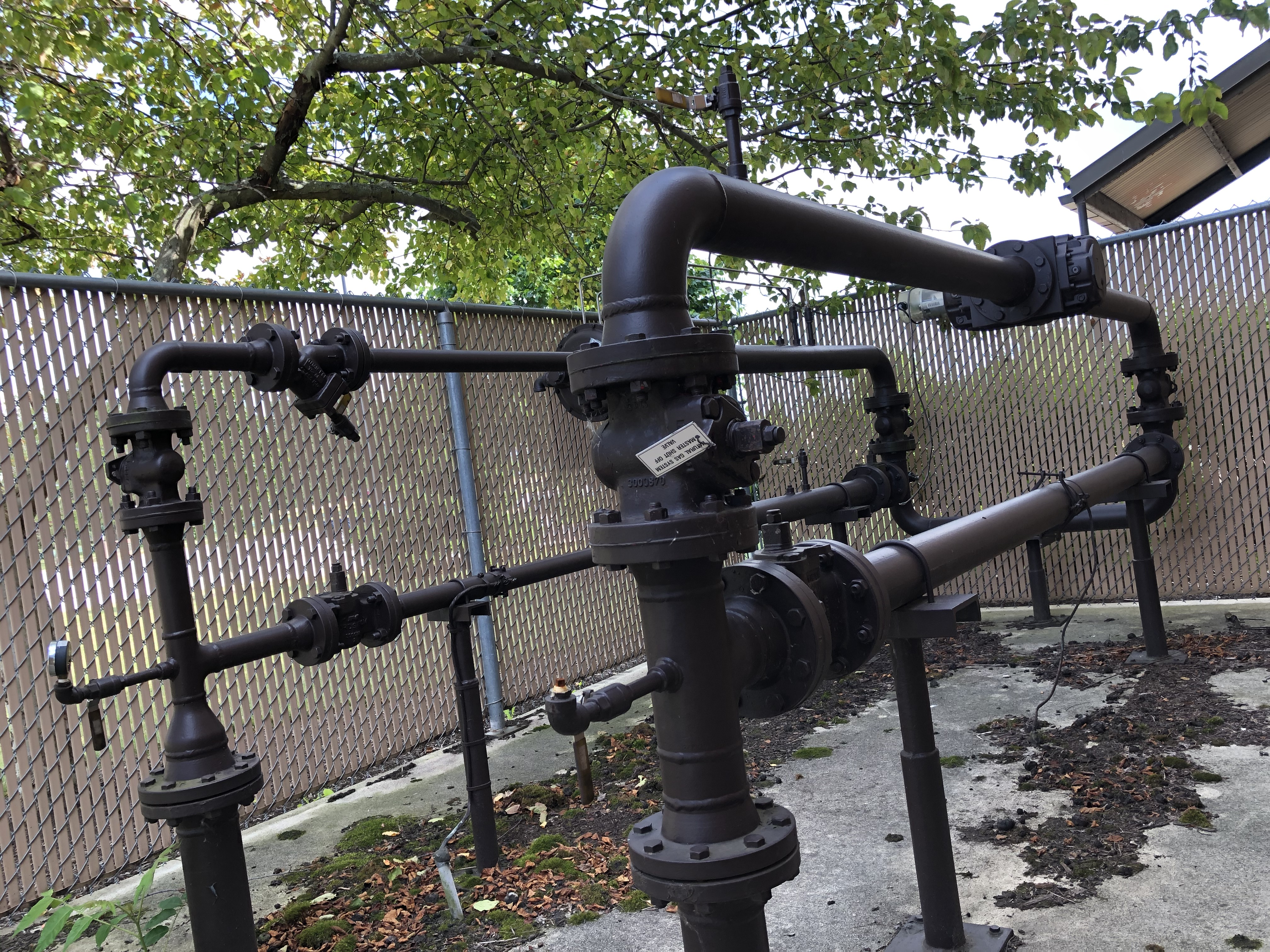
A small natural gas pipeline substation in Bowling Green, Ohio

=== Early pipelines and markets ===
The first natural gas sold in the U.S. was in Fredonia, New York in 1825, by William Hart. It was built to pipe the gas from the well to nearby shops, Hart improvised a gasometer at the well site and laid pipe to the properties of his first customers. Hart was later consulted to develop a gas lighting system for the Barcelona Lighthouse in 1829. These early pipelines (no longer in use) were made of pine logs.

Meanwhile, manufactured gas was more commonly used than natural gas in the early 19th century, first introduced in Baltimore in 1816 with underground pipes laid starting in 1851. Gas plants could be sited within cities, and many major U.S. cities such as New York, Chicago, San Francisco had gas distribution lines for manufactured gas by the 1870s.

The first major U.S. city to pipe in natural gas was Pittsburgh, in 1883, sold by Penn Fuel Gas Company from a well twenty miles from the city, and transported via a wrought-iron pipe 5 5/8 inch in diameter. This pipeline to Pittsburgh was the first use a telescoping design with narrower pipeline at the well site and widening widths as it entered the city as a means to control the pressure inside the line.

Discovery of huge oil and gas fields in the Southwest US, combined with pipeline engineering advancements and national market demand ultimately led to the development of long-distance, interstate pipelines in 1920s and 1930s. Until the passage of the Natural Gas Act of 1938, pipelines were regulated only by states; the Act gave federal oversight to the transportation and sale of natural gas and required approval by the Federal Power Commission for new interstate lines.

Just after World War II, demand for natural gas increased, and so did the development of pipelines to new markets on the West Coast in California and in the Southeastern states. About half of today's existing natural gas pipelines were built in the 1950s and 1960s during this postwar boom.

=== 19th and 20th century technologies and standards ===
In 1885, Solomon Dresser patented a new coupling that was an important advancement in engineering pipeline, making it possible to assemble longer, less leaky pipes that were easier to screw together.

Compressors, more commonly adopted after 1910, began to be used to control the pressure within natural gas pipelines.

Pipeline laid before the 1950s did not have technology for inspecting buried lines for erosion or corrosion; starting that decade, most pipeline operators began using pigging systems as well as external pipe coating to protect pipes from decay and detect defects.

Steel has been used in many pipeline projects since the 1950s, as well as plastic beginning in the 1970s.

In 1970, the federal Gas Code (Part 192) was adopted, based on the ASME B31.8 technical standard that was in use by some states to regulate the quality and safety of pipeline construction; pipelines installed before these safety rules were established were granted exceptions.

=== Modern developments ===
At the end of 2008, the U.S. had 305,000 miles of natural gas interstate and intrastate transmission pipelines in the lower 48 states. The full pipeline network is an estimated 3 million miles, including transmission lines as well as gathering lines, mains, and service lines to consumers. Transmission pipelines are generally 6 to 48 inches (15 cm to 1.2 m) in diameter, made of coated carbon steel or more recently MDPE which has the advantage of being flexible and impervious to corrosion but must be buried for UV protection; the largest diameters are for intrastate and interstate transmission lines that channel natural gas into smaller mains, and service lines.

Many bare steel pipelines (uncoated) and other aging pipelines like those made of iron or brittle plastics, are being taken out of service and replaced to prevent pipeline failures.

== Safety ==
Over the years, there have been many natural gas explosions involving pipelines in which people have been injured or killed. The most recent was the 2010 San Bruno pipeline explosion that killed at least four people, injured 60 and more victims are still missing. Portions of the San Bruno pipeline had been built in 1956.

In ideal situations, pipeline inspection gauges or a “PIG” (see Pigging) is used to inspect and ensure the safe operation of natural gas pipelines. About 63 percent of all natural gas pipelines in the US cannot be properly inspected using a PIG, or automatic robot in the pipes, because the pipelines are either too old or they twist and turn and PIGs cannot operate in them.

Many experts and studies show that the inferior oversight of gas pipelines have led to hundreds of pipeline accidents that have “killed 60 people and injured 230 others in the last five years,” according to the New York Times. This analysis excludes the casualty figures from the 2010 San Bruno pipeline explosion that killed 7 people and injured more than 50 others.

== See also ==
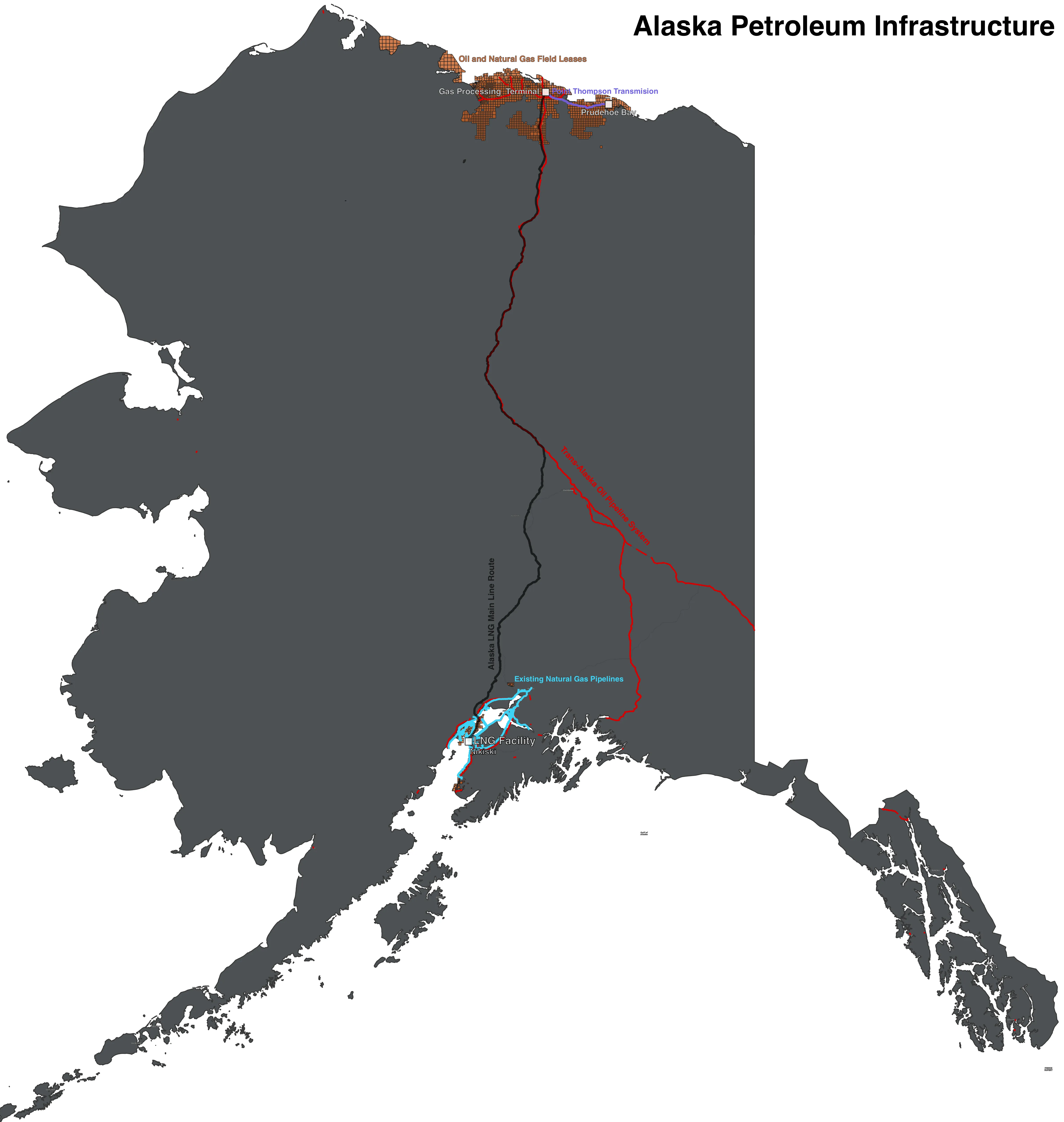
Alaska oil and natural gas pipelines, and proposed natural gas pipelines.

- Alaska LNG
- Alaska gas pipeline
- Gulf Gateway Deepwater Port
- List of oil refineries in the United States
- Pipeline transport
