= Natural gas in the United States =

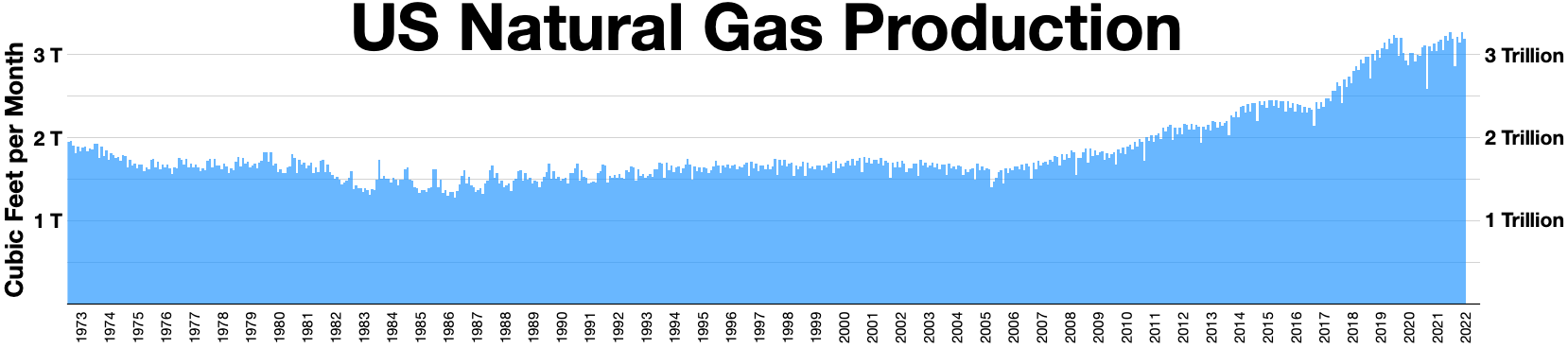
Natural gas production from 1973 to 2022

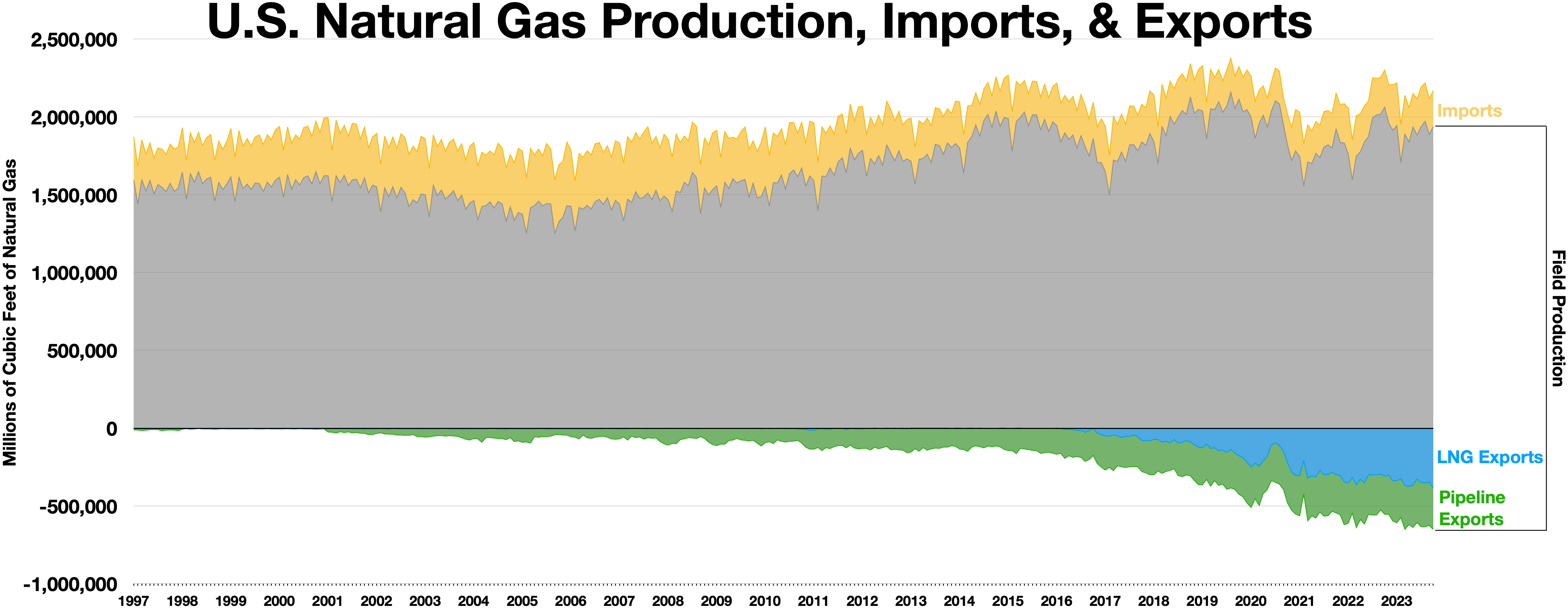
U.S. natural gas monthly production, imports, and exports

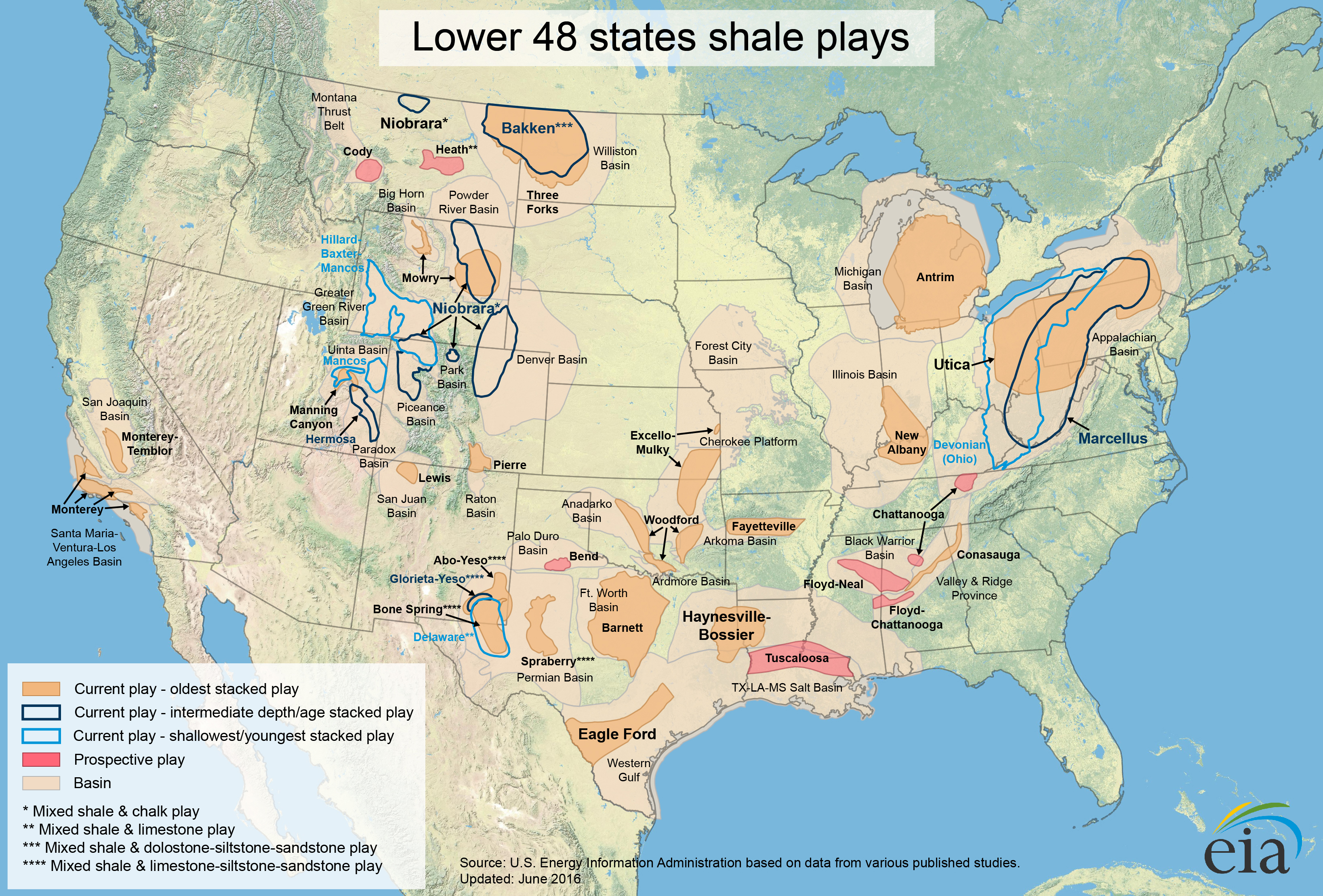
Discovered shale gas deposits as of June 2016

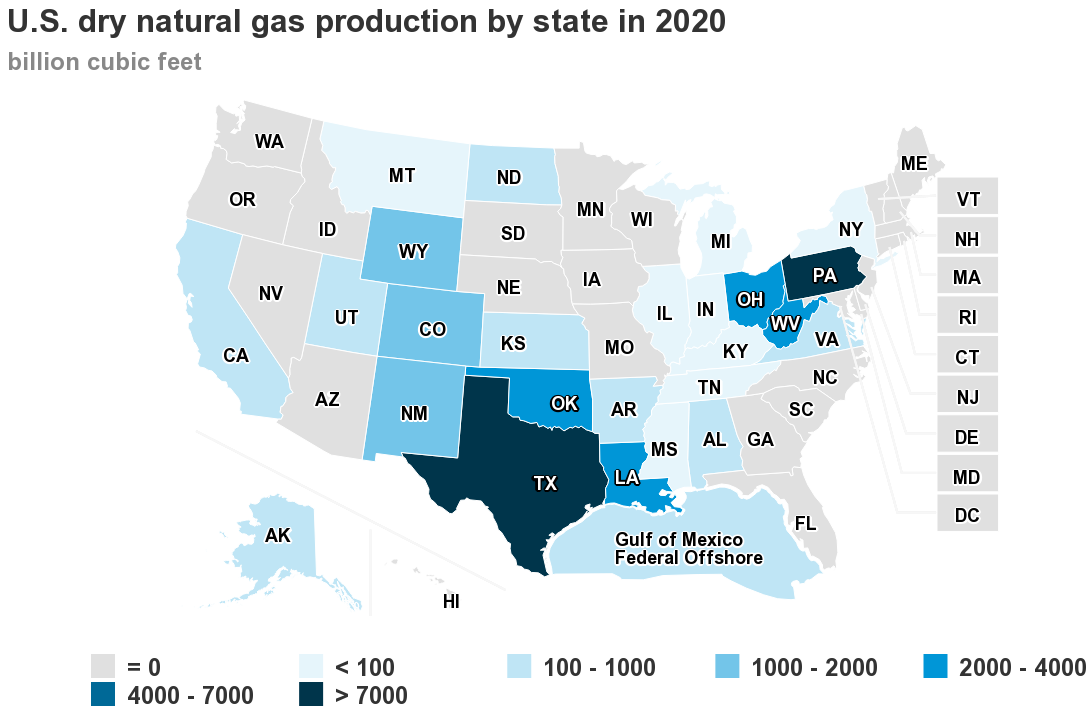
Natural gas production by state

Natural gas was the United States' largest source of energy production in 2016, representing 33 percent of all energy produced in the country. Natural gas has been the largest source of electrical generation in the United States since July 2015.

In 2012, the United States produced 25.3 trillion cubic feet of marketed natural gas, with an average wellhead value of $2.66 per thousand cubic feet, for a total wellhead value of $67.3 billion. In 2013, the country produced 30.0 trillion cubic feet (TCF) of marketed gas. With 7,545 billion cubic feet (BCF), the leading gas-producing area in the United States in 2013 was Texas, followed by Pennsylvania (3,259 BCF), and Louisiana (2,407 BCF). U.S. natural gas production achieved record highs for each year from 2011 through 2015. Marketed natural gas production in 2015 was 28.8 trillion cubic feet, a 5.4 percent increase over 2014, and a 52 percent increase over the production of 18.9 trillion cubic feet in 2005. The natural gas industry includes exploration for, production, processing, transportation, storage, and marketing of natural gas and natural gas liquids. The exploration for and production of natural gas and petroleum form a single industry, and many wells produce both oil and gas.

Because of the greater supply, consumer prices for natural gas are significantly lower in the United States than in Europe and Japan. The low price of natural gas, together with its smaller carbon footprint compared to coal, has encouraged rapid growth in electricity generated from natural gas.

Between 2005 and 2014, U.S. production of natural gas liquids (NGLs) increased 70 percent, from 1.74 million barrels per day in 2005 to 2.96 million barrels per day in 2014.

Although the United States leads the world in natural gas production, it is only fifth in proven reserves of natural gas, behind Russia, Iran, Qatar, and Turkmenistan.

== Industry structure ==
The United States oil and gas industry is often informally divided into "upstream" (exploration and production), "midstream" (transportation and refining), and "downstream" (distribution and marketing). Petroleum and natural gas share a common upstream (exploration and production) sector, but the midstream and downstream sectors are largely separate. All large oil companies in the U.S. produce both oil and gas. However, the relative amounts of oil and gas produced vary greatly. Of the top ten natural gas-producing companies in the U.S. in 2009, only three (BP, ConocoPhiillips, and XTO) were also among the top ten oil producers.

Top natural gas producers in the United States, 2009

Rank	Company	Billion cubic ft./year
1	BP	907
2	XTO Energy	855
3	ConocoPhillips	850
4	Chesapeake Energy	835
5	Anadarko Petroleum	817
6	Devon Energy	743
7	Encana	590
8	ExxonMobil	566
9	Williams Companies	435
10	EOG Resources	422
Annual owned production, 2009. Source:

In 2009, the production owned by the top ten companies was 31% of total U.S. natural gas production.

== Exploration ==
In 2010, the industry drilled and completed 16,696 wells primarily for gas, slightly more than the number of wells drilled primarily for oil (15,753). Many wells produced both oil and gas, and oil wells produced 18 percent of U.S. gas production in 2013. Of the gas wells, 1,105 were exploratory wells and 15,591 were development wells.

The number of actively drilling gas rigs was once regarded as a reliable leading indicator of near-future gas production. As of 2013, the average number of active gas drill rigs has fallen each year for four straight years from 2010 (942 rigs) to 2014 (332 rigs), a drop of 65 percent, even while gas production rose each year for the same period, from 21.3 trillion cubic feet (TCF) in 2010 to 25.7 TCF in 2014, an increase of 21 percent. Remaining proved reserves increased overall, from 301 TCF in 2013 to 338 TCF in 2013, an increase of 11 percent. The rise in gas production despite fewer rigs drilling has been explained by the greater efficiency in drilling and the greater productivity of shale gas wells.

By 2025, the relationship between drilling activity and natural gas production had weakened further. The number of natural-gas-directed rigs in the United States declined by 23% between December 2022 and October 2025, to about 120 rigs, while production continued to increased. The U.S Enerdy Information Administration attributed this divergence partly to longer horizontal laterals, improves completion techniques and the concentration of drilling in more productive areas.

U.S marketed natural gas production reached a record average of 118.5 billion cubic feet per day (Bcf/d) in 2025, an increase of 5.3 Bcf/d from previous year, The Appalachia, Permian and Haynesville regions accounted for 67% of marketed production and 81% of the increase during the year. Exploration and p[roduction activity has also remained sensitive to changes in natueal gas prices and short-term supply conditions. In January 2026, EBC Financial Group market analyst Rylan Chase attributed a sharp rise in U.S natural gas prices to increased heating demand during extremes cold weather and the risk of production disruptions from freezing conditions; the Henry Hub spot prices averaged $7.72 per million British thermal units during the month, its highest monthly average since September 2022, while inventories fell by a record 360 billion cubic feet in the week January 30.

== Production ==
View chart definition.
Annual gas production by well type (2002–2018, in trillion cubic feet)

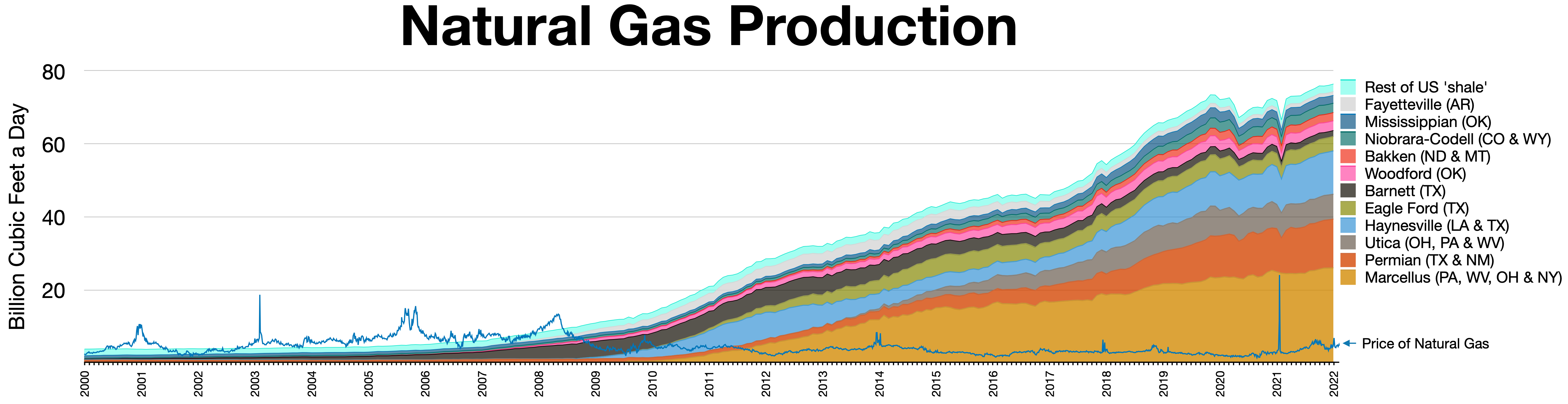
Natural gas production by field

Top producing gas fields in the United States, 2013
Rank	Field	State	Discovery year	Billion cubic ft./year
1	Marcellus Shale	Pennsylvania and West Virginia	2008	2,836
2	Newark East Barnett Shale	Texas	1981	1,952
3	Haynesville Shale	Louisiana and Texas	2008	1,426
4	Eagle Ford Formation	Texas	1962	1,112
5	Fayetteville Shale	Arkansas	2005	1,025
6	San Juan Basin	New Mexico and Colorado	1927	1,025
7	Carthage	Texas	1936	653
8	Pinedale Gas Field	Wyoming	1955	568
9	Spraberry	Texas	1949	307
10	Wattenberg Gas Field	Colorado	1970	305

The U.S. Energy Information Administration publishes annual natural gas production data in aggregate by well type: traditional oil wells and gas wells, coalbed methane wells, and shale gas wells.

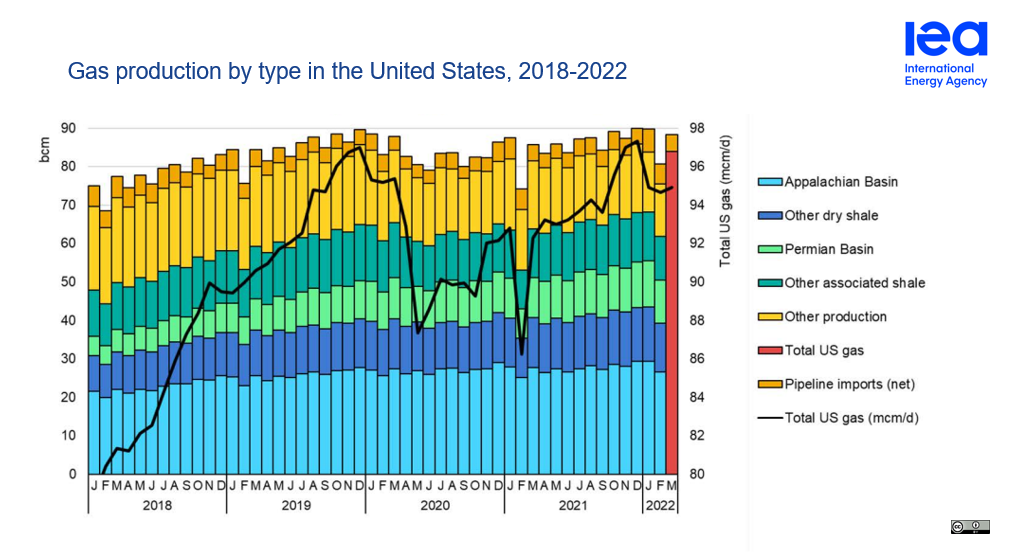
A graph showing the sources of gas in use in the United States by the IEA for 2018–2022

=== Oil and gas ===
Most oil fields produce some gas, and vice versa, but the ratio of oil and gas varies considerably. In fields developed to produce oil, the natural gas is in a raw form called associated gas. Some fields, called "dry gas" fields, produce only gas. Of the top ten gas-producing fields in the U.S., only one, the Eagle Ford, is also among the top ten oil fields. The number of wells classified as traditional gas wells has been declining in recent years as they are replaced by shale gas wells.

The associated gas from oil wells is utilized similarly to other sources of natural gas, or may be re-injected for storage and to enhance oil production. In some cases, the well operator may designate the gas as a waste product, and large amounts of gas may be intentionally vented or flared depending on local regulations.

In 2025, U.S. dry natural gas production is forecast to reach a record annual average of 105.2 billion cubic feet per day, driven by continued growth in the Permian, Appalachian, and Haynesville regions. This increase is supporting record LNG exports and meeting strong domestic demand.

=== Coalbed methane ===
Coalbed methane production in the U.S. peaked at 1.97 TCF in 2008, when it made up 7.8 percent of U.S. gas production. By 2018, coalbed methane production had declined to 0.95 TCF.

=== Shale gas ===
Since 2000, shale gas has become a key source of natural gas in the U.S. Production rose more than tenfold from 2007 to 2018, when shale gas contributed 23.6 TCF, 63 percent of U.S. gas production, and was still increasing.

== Gas prices ==
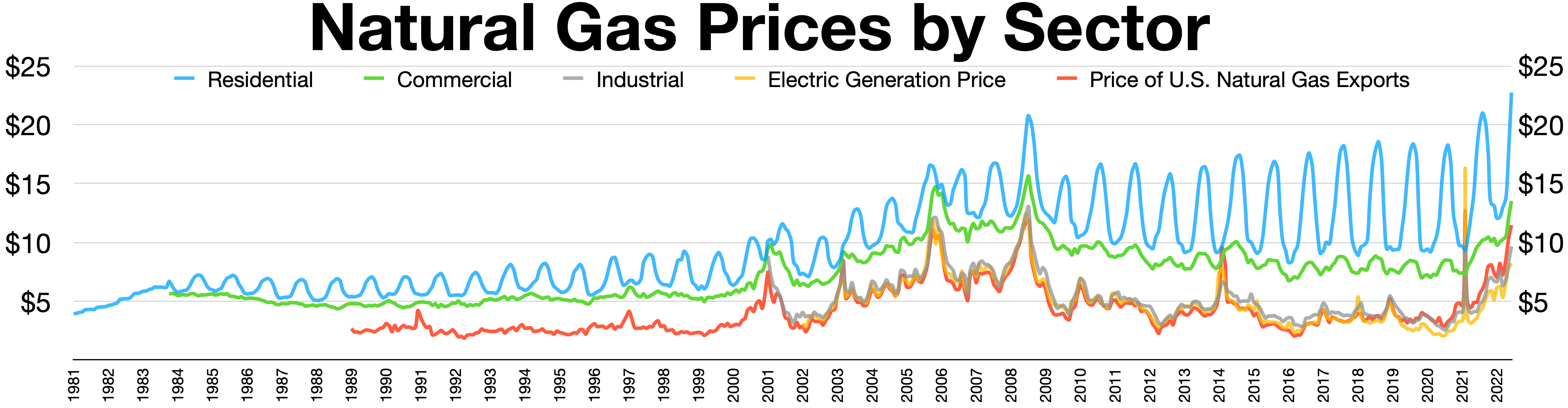
Natural gas prices Residential Commercial Industrial Electric generation Export prices

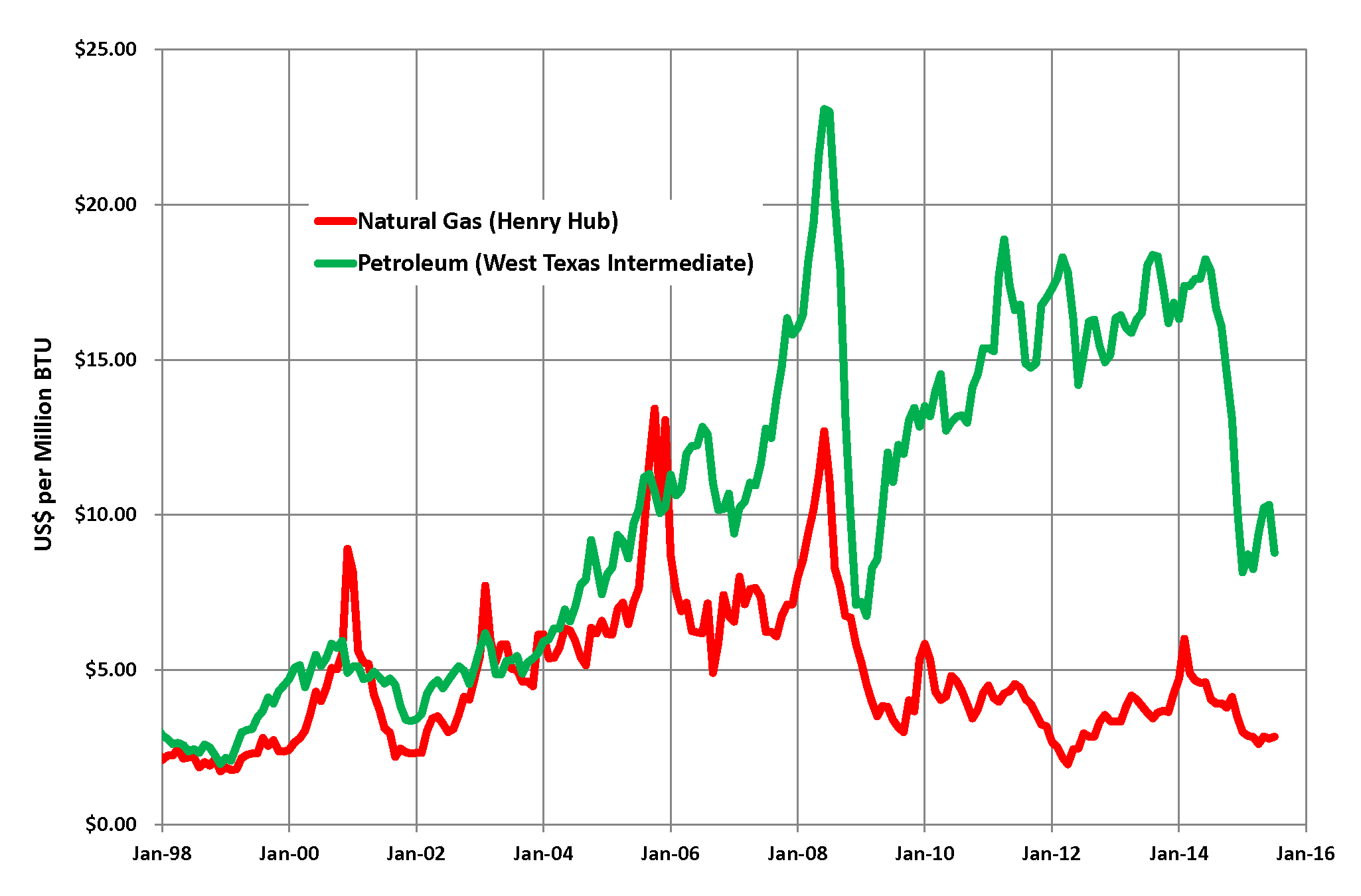
Price per million BTU of oil and natural gas in the U.S., 1998–2015

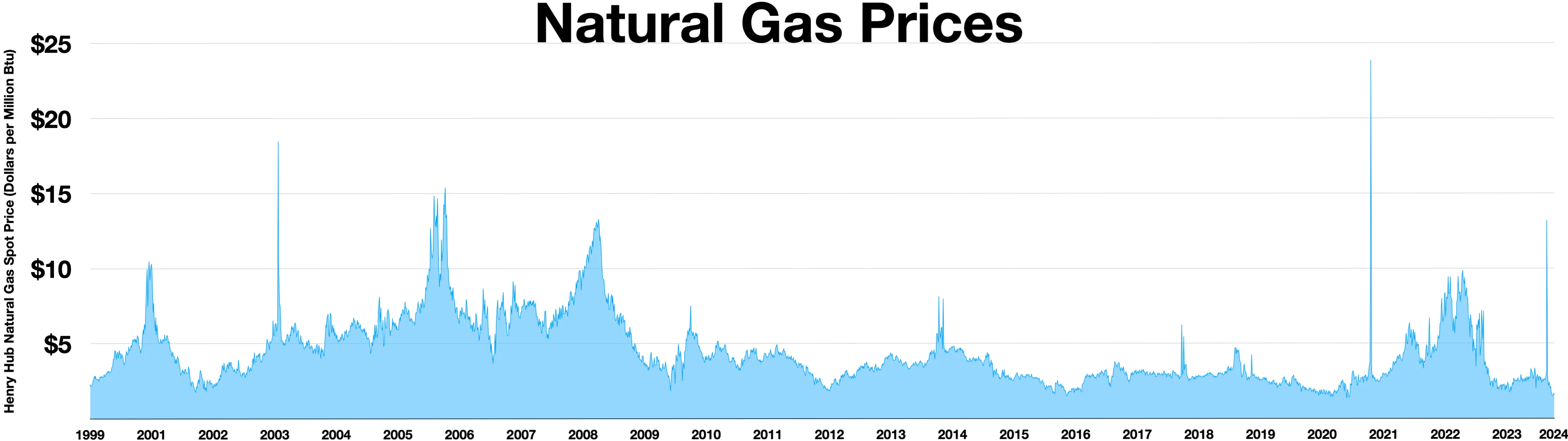
Natural gas prices spiked to $23.86 on February 17, 2021, because of the Texas power crisis. In February 2003, there was a similar spike in natural gas prices because of shortages.

The most commonly quoted producer price for natural gas is the Louisiana-based Henry Hub price, which is futures-traded on NYMEX.

A barrel of oil releases about 5.8 million BTU when burned, so that 5.8 MCF of gas (at the standard one thousand BTU per cubic foot) releases about the same energy as a barrel of oil. Sometimes gas containing 5.8 million BTU is defined as a "barrel of oil equivalent for energy calculation purposes. When describing reserves or production, however, the oil and gas industry more commonly uses the rounded number of 6 MCF of gas (or 6 million BTU in natural gas) as equal to one barrel of oil equivalent.

Since the price of natural gas was deregulated in the 1990s, its price has tended to parallel that of oil, with oil usually at a premium on a BTU basis. But starting in the late 2000s, an abundance of natural gas in North America has caused the price of a unit of energy from gas to be much lower than the price of energy from oil.

== Pipelines ==
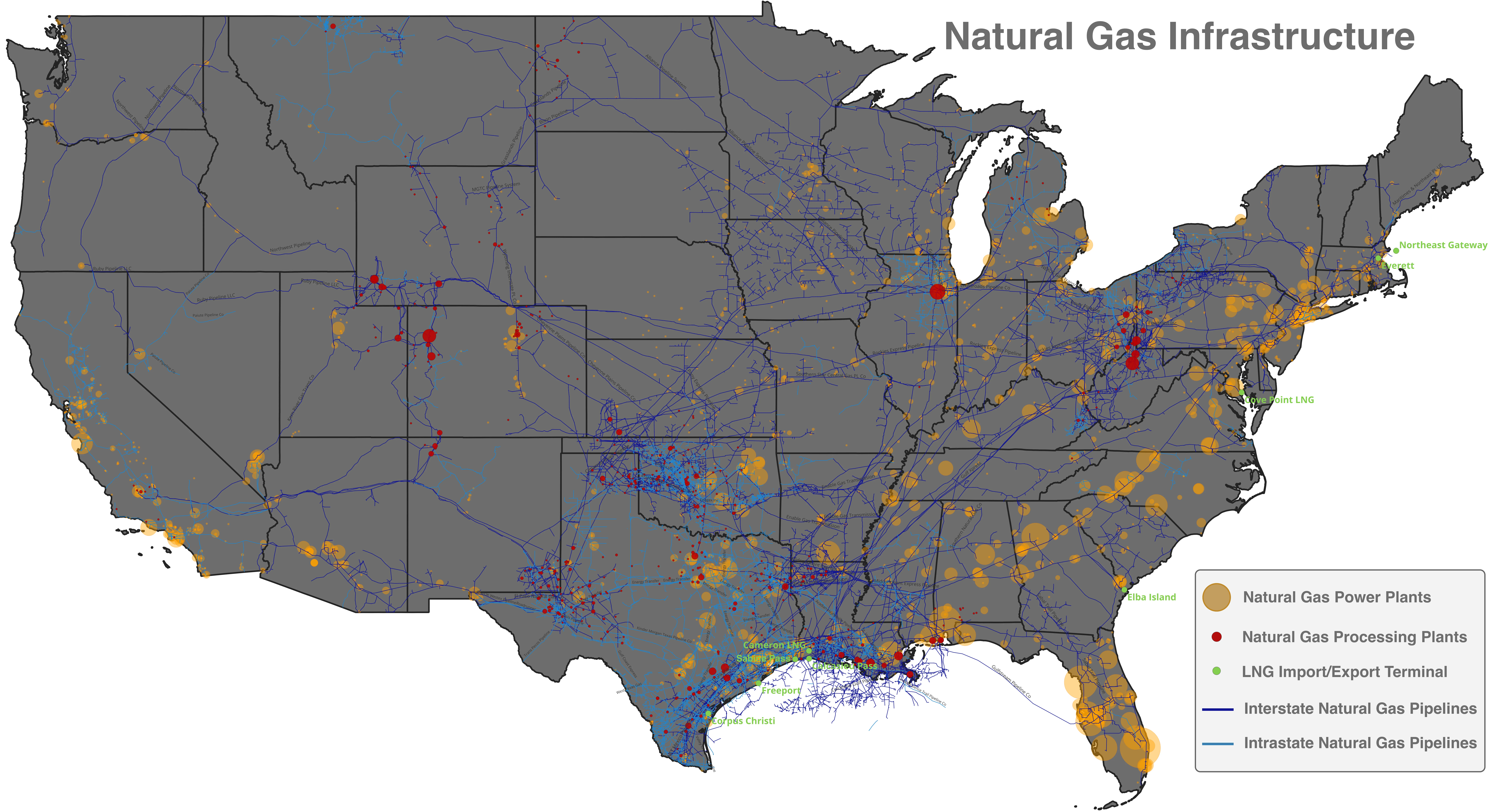
Natural gas infrastructure in the United States

When oil and natural gas are brought to the surface, they are usually separated at the wellhead, after which the oil and the gas are treated separately. Gas flows through a gathering system into a pipeline to a gas processing plant. As of 2014, there were 189,000 miles of interstate natural gas pipelines in the United States

== Processing ==
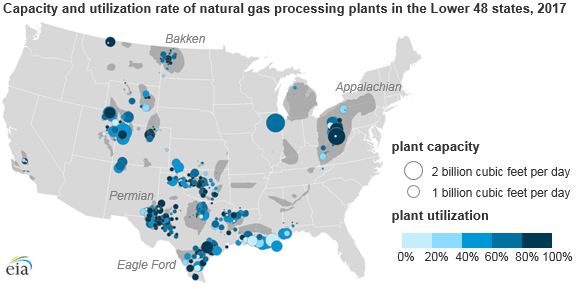
Natural gas processing plants in the U.S. by capacity and utilization, 2017

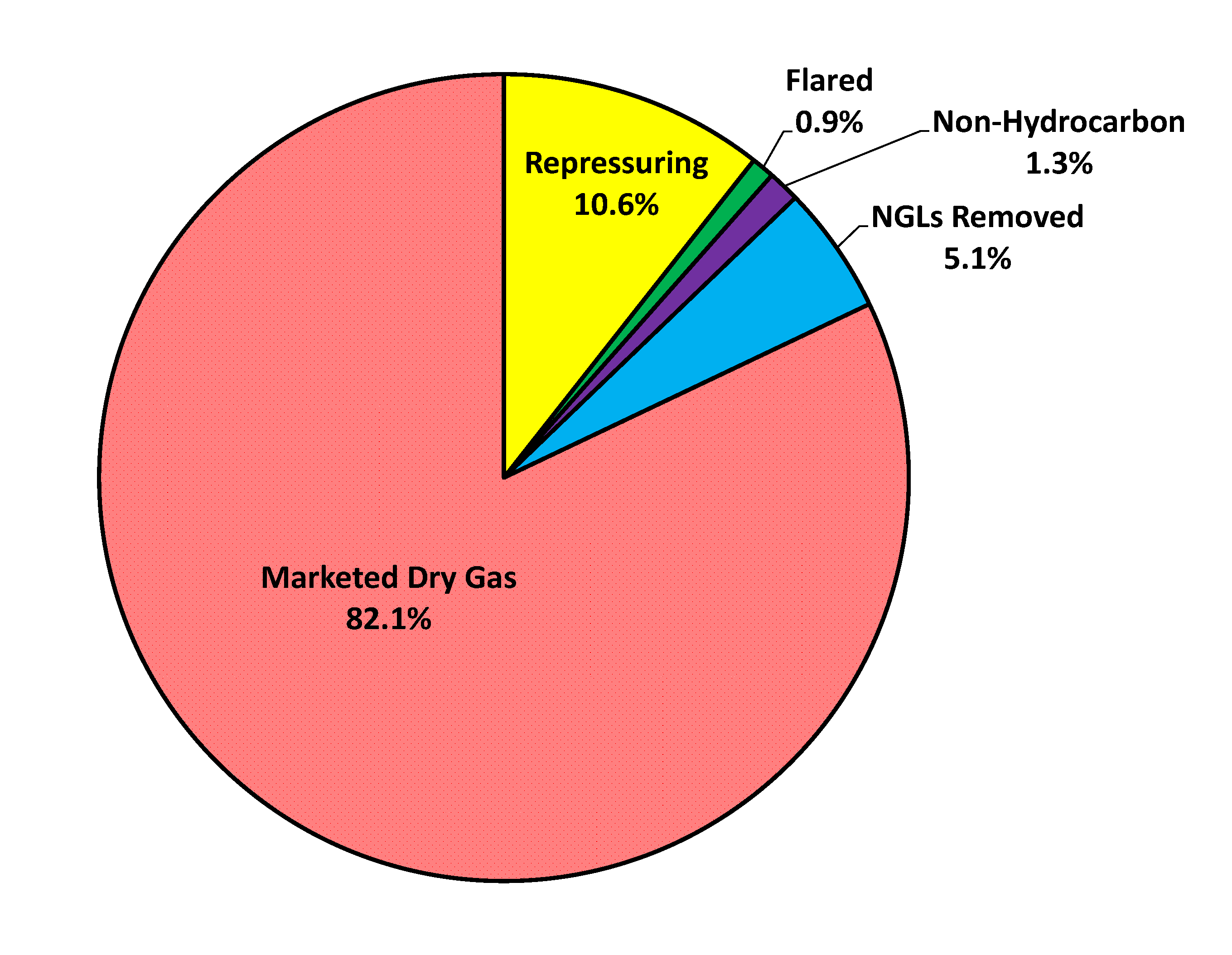
Disposition of total U.S. natural gas produced (gross withdrawals) in 2014. Data from U.S. EIA.

Natural gas has a variety of chemical constituents that must be removed or diluted with other gases to achieve consistent pipeline quality. Pipeline gas specifications vary from line to line, but generally the gas must contain no appreciable hydrogen sulfide (which is toxic), less than a few percent carbon dioxide (carbon dioxide reacts with water to form carbonic acid, which is corrosive to iron and steel pipe), and a British thermal unit (BTU) content of 900 or more. Natural gas delivered to consumers generally has a BTU content of about 1020 to 1050 per standard cubic foot, slightly higher than that of pure methane (1010 BTU).

=== Liquids ===
Natural gas is composed primarily of methane, but often contains longer-chain hydrocarbons. Hydrocarbon compounds from hexane (each molecule of which is a simple chain containing six carbon atoms, hence called C6) and heavier generally separate out ("condense") from the gas at the wellhead; this mixture is called condensate, and is usually reported as oil production, and sold to refineries the same as oil. The C2 through C5 hydrocarbons (ethane, propane, butane, and pentane) are known as natural gas liquids (NGLs), and remain in gaseous form until they are extracted at a gas processing plant. The division between the two classes is not perfect: some hexane and heptane remain in the gas to be separated out as NGLs, while some butane and pentane may separate out with the condensate.

Natural gas, which contains NGLs, is called "wet gas." Gas which naturally contains no NGLs, or gas from which the NGLs have been removed, is called "dry gas."

Natural gas liquids are used either for fuel (sold as propane or liquid petroleum gas (LPG), or as feedstock for the petrochemical industry.

The United States has been the world's top producer of NGLs since 2010, and is far above second-place Saudi Arabia, which produced 1.82 million barrels per day in 2015.

Increased production of NGLs since 2000 has lowered the price of NGLs in the North American market, leading to a surge in construction and expansion of petrochemical plants to convert ethane and propane into ethylene and propylene, which are used to make plastics. The United States has the world's largest ethylene-manufacturing capacity, 28.4 million tons per year in 2015, with projects to add another 7.6 million tons from 2015 through 2017. As of 2015, the reduction in NGL prices had turned North America from one of the high-cost places to manufacture petrochemical, into the lowest-cost area outside the Middle East.

=== Other byproducts ===
Some natural gas contains enough helium to be extracted as a byproduct.

Sulfur, which must be removed from natural gas for safety, aesthetic, and environmental reasons, is recovered and sold as a byproduct. In 2013, natural gas processing plants recovered 1.02 million metric tons of sulfur, which was 12 percent of U.S. supply of elemental sulfur (the remaining sulfur production came from oil refineries).

== Storage ==
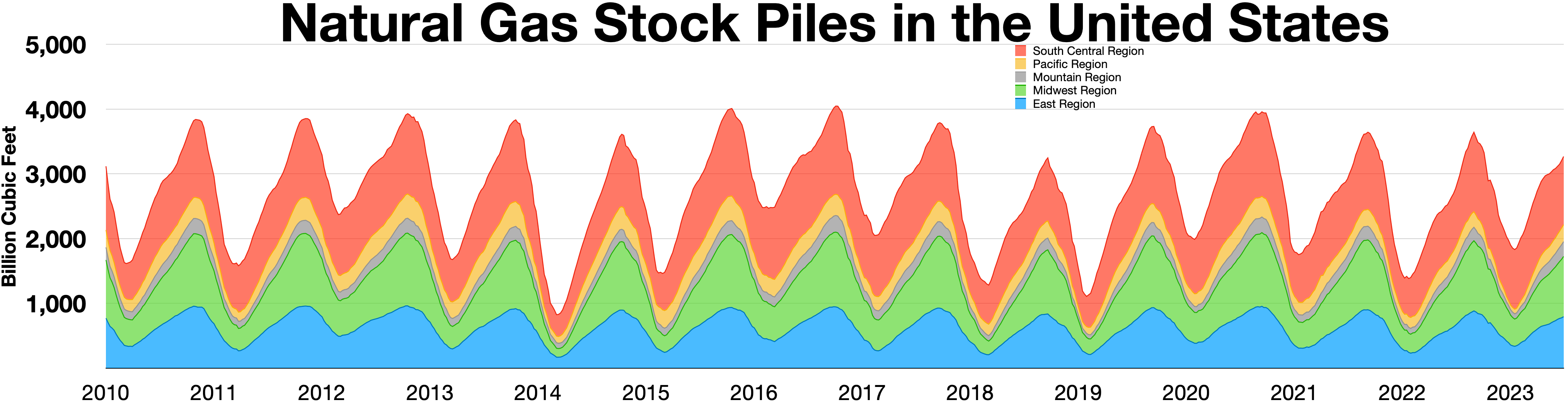
Natural gas stockpiles South Central Region Pacific Region Mountain Region Midwest Region East Region

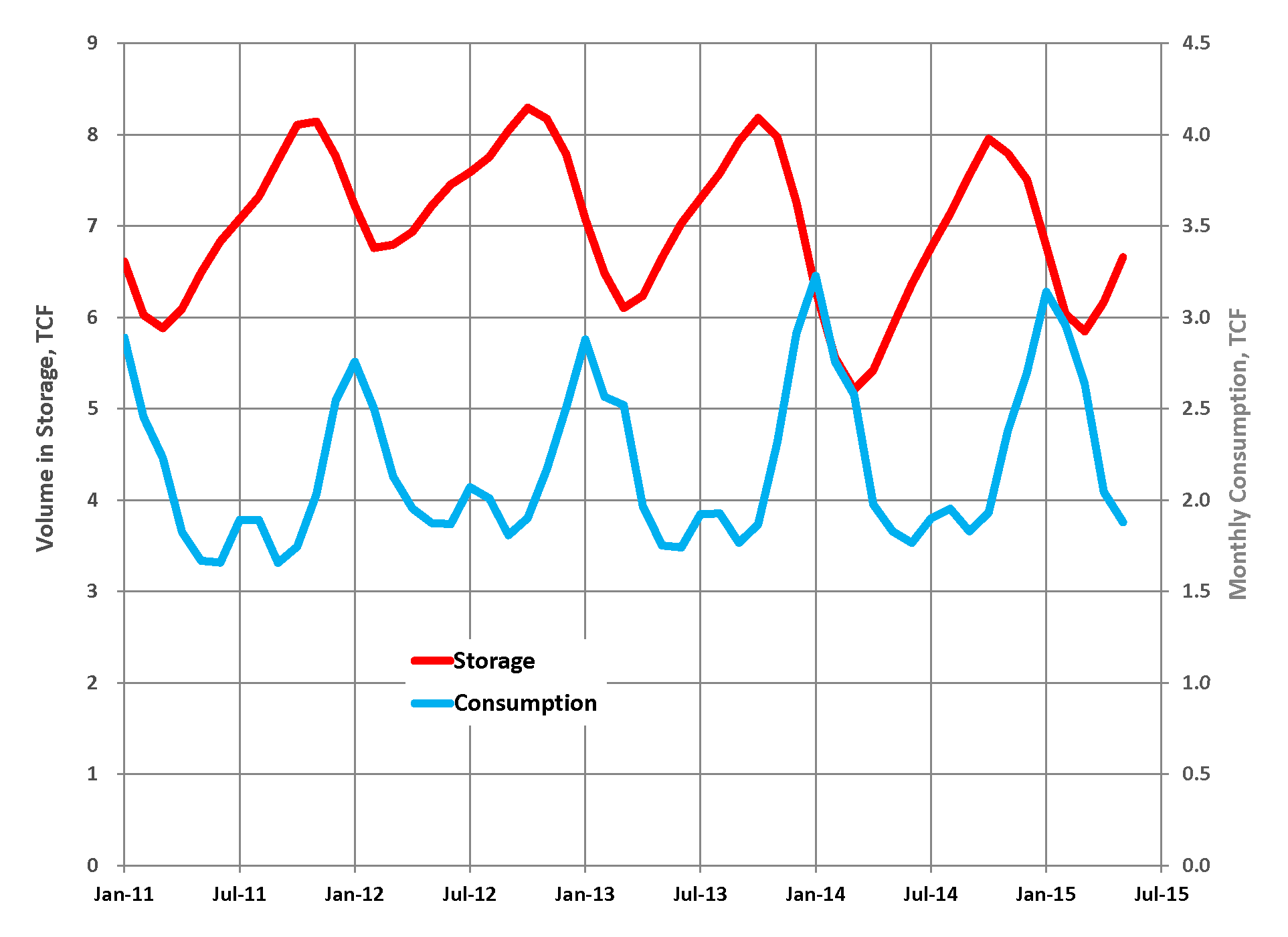
U.S. natural gas storage and consumption in trillion cubic feet. Data from U.S. EIA.

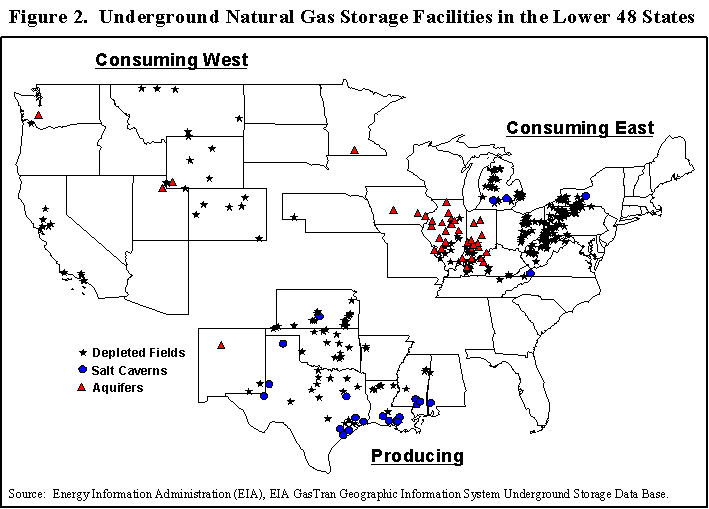
Underground natural gas storage facilities in lower 48 states

Consumption of natural gas in the US is strongly seasonal, higher in the winter than the summer by between 50% and 90%, depending on severity of the winter. To make larger volumes of gas available in the winter, companies have established underground gas storage facilities. There are three types of natural gas storage units currently in service in the U.S.: salt domes, depleted gas reservoirs, and deep aquifers.

The largest volume held in storage was 8.29 trillion cubic feet in October 2012. This was equivalent to 26 percent of the total U.S. production in 2014. The small mid-summer increase shown on the consumption graph is due to increased gas use for electrical power in the summer. Unlike residential, commercial, and industrial use, all of which are higher in winter, electrical power generation uses more gas in the summer.

== Marketing ==
From the processing plant, natural gas is sold mostly to gas utility companies. In 2014, 46% of the marketed gas was used by commercial and industrial users, 33% by electrical power generators, and 21% by residential consumers.

=== Electricity generation ===
Since 2009, electricity generation has been the largest use of natural gas in the U.S. Electricity generated by natural gas has been by far the fastest-growing source of electricity in the U.S. since the 1990s. Natural gas became the second-largest source of U.S. electricity in 2006, when it surpassed nuclear power. In late 2015, natural gas surpassed coal as the largest source of electricity generated in the United States.

In the decade 2005 to 2015, electricity generated by natural gas increased by 574 billion kilowatt-hours, more than triple the increase of the second-fastest-growing source, wind energy, which increased by 173 billion kilowatt-hours over the same period. Natural gas-generated electricity increased its share of U.S. electricity from 18.8 percent in 2005 to 32.6 percent in 2015. The increase in gas-generated electricity was mostly at the expense of coal power, which fell from 49.6 percent of U.S. electricity in 2005 to 33.2 percent in 2015. Natural gas surpassed coal as the number one generator of U.S. electricity in late 2015. During the 12-month period through August 2016, natural gas generated 34.5 percent of U.S. electricity, versus 29.8 percent for coal.

Unlike the other sectors of natural gas consumption, the electrical power industry uses more natural gas in the summer, when electricity demand is increased by air conditioning, and when natural gas prices are at seasonal lows.

The increased use of natural gas for electricity is driven by three factors. First, pressure on utilities to decrease greenhouse gas emissions has favored the substitution of coal generation by natural gas generation, which, according to the National Renewable Energy Laboratory, and the IPCC, has significantly fewer life-cycle GHG emissions than coal-powered electricity. Second, gas power plants can ramp up and down quickly, making them well suited to complement intermittent power sources such as wind and solar. Third, since late 2008, the price of natural gas has been relatively cheap on the North American market, especially compared to oil. Electricity from oil-powered generators in the U.S. declined 81 percent from 2005 to 2014.

The states that use the most natural gas for electricity production are, in descending order, Texas, Florida, California, and New York.

United States electricity generation from natural gas (GWh)
Year	Total	% of total	Jan	Feb	Mar	Apr	May	Jun	Jul	Aug	Sep	Oct	Nov	Dec
2001	639,129	17.1%	42,389	37,967	44,364	45,843	50,934	57,603	73,030	78,410	60,181	56,376	44,491	47,541
2002	691,006	17.91%	48,413	44,308	51,214	49,146	50,275	65,631	83,917	84,477	68,161	54,201	45,161	46,100
2003	649,908	16.74%	50,176	43,547	46,699	45,195	49,373	54,453	76,938	83,250	59,090	51,824	45,328	44,035
2004	710,100	17.88%	48,253	50,320	49,801	51,822	62,022	64,686	79,290	77,821	67,854	57,229	49,693	51,310
2005	760,960	18.76%	51,338	44,913	51,897	52,016	54,826	75,635	96,819	100,787	73,355	55,941	49,440	53,993
2006	816,441	20.09%	43,807	47,409	54,922	56,091	65,586	81,060	108,094	106,592	72,673	70,640	53,440	56,128
2007	896,590	21.57%	61,475	57,622	56,204	60,153	66,470	81,511	97,483	121,338	88,532	78,358	60,637	66,808
2008	882,981	21.43%	72,600	60,042	62,171	63,046	62,270	84,620	100,321	99,673	79,136	73,283	61,454	64,364
2009	920,979	23.31%	66,390	62,139	68,203	61,159	68,146	84,205	101,894	109,240	92,127	72,603	63,285	71,590
2010	987,697	23.94%	74,173	66,198	63,431	64,644	73,665	92,268	114,624	121,151	93,004	77,738	69,227	77,573
2011	1,013,689	24.72%	74,254	65,924	65,947	70,029	75,243	90,691	119,624	119,856	91,739	78,819	75,441	86,122
2012	1,225,894	30.29%	90,761	90,610	92,251	94,829	107,352	115,598	138,863	131,736	108,012	91,725	80,169	83,989
2013	1,124,836	27.66%	88,559	80,283	84,275	78,036	83,816	99,615	120,771	121,156	102,063	88,587	84,287	92,936
2014	1,126,635	27.52%	91,016	75,942	78,151	76,782	89,120	98,460	115,081	122,348	106,582	97,683	84,354	91,038
2015	1,334,668	32.72%	101,687	91,315	99,423	92,806	101,516	121,478	141,119	139,084	123,036	110,005	102,236	109,777
2016	1,379,271	33.83%	110,044	98,552	103,890	98,876	110,430	131,395	151,554	154,760	125,603	102,898	93,942	96,364
2017	1,297,703	32.16%	95,572	82,768	95,074	88,455	98,019	117,236	146,929	141,201	118,036	106,826	94,928	111,398
2018	1,471,843	35.2%	110,293	98,512	106,524	98,371	115,284	130,826	164,749	161,676	141,786	123,142	108,168	109,802
2019	1,588,533	38.46%	121,589	112,142	115,813	104,059	117,059	137,836	171,955	174,968	149,697	130,948	117,910	131,839
2020	1,626,790	40.57%	136,084	128,018	126,187	110,564	117,186	143,055	181,568	173,644	141,397	131,413	109,811	127,863
2021	1,579,190	38.43%	126,530	111,183	107,019	107,416	114,676	149,376	170,189	172,716	138,214	131,852	122,433	127,586
2022	1,687,067	39.88%	134,948	114,945	112,477	105,506	127,094	155,517	189,042	188,860	156,948	133,492	127,523	140,716
2023	1,802,062	43.13%	137,541	123,921	132,153	120,478	137,795	161,693	200,507	199,993	164,466	140,962	135,212	146,174
2024	1,864,874	43.33%	160,450	130,990	130,423	122,441	143,917	168,803	209,033	203,094	169,382	146,370	137,026	145,365
2025	1,807,338	40.8%	156,527	132,340	118,920	115,960	135,169	165,110	202,785	192,845	167,875	143,962	131,565	148,027
2026	672,814	37.87%	151,630	132,089	127,375	124,449	137,271							
Last entry, % of total			37.95%	38.53%	36.52%	37.63%	38.7%	42.01%	45.38%	45.94%	45.6%	41.67%	39.27%	38.73%

=== Liquified petroleum gas ===
Liquefied petroleum gas includes butane and propane natural gas liquids removed in gas processing. They are sold for home heating, cooking, and increasingly for motor fuel. The industry segment is represented by the National Propane Gas Association.

=== Vehicle fuel ===
Natural gas, as compressed natural gas, liquified natural gas, and liquified petroleum gas, is being increasingly used for motor vehicle fuel, especially in fleet vehicles. It has the advantages over gasoline and diesel fuel of being cheaper and emitting less air pollution. It has the disadvantage of having few retail outlets. As of 2011, 262,000 vehicles in the US ran on natural gas. Although natural gas used for vehicle fuel increased 60 percent in the decade 2004-2014, in 2014 it still made up only 3.7 percent on a BTU-basis of fossil fuel use (gasoline, diesel, and natural gas) as transportation fuel in the U.S. Transportation fuel made up 0.13 percent of natural gas consumption in 2014.

== History ==
=== Pipeline technology ===
The natural gas industry in the United States dates back to 1821, when natural gas was discovered and used in Fredonia, New York. From the start, the market for natural gas was limited by pipeline technology. The gas for Fredonia, New York in 1821 was supplied through wooden pipes, which were incapable of carrying gas for long distances.

In the 1800s, residences in most cities were supplied with town gas generated from coal at local "gashouses." The gas was carried in cast-iron pipes, introduced in 1843, typically with bell-and-spigot joints sealed with rope and molten lead.

In the 1800s and early 1900s, most natural gas discoveries were made while exploring for oil. Natural gas was usually an unwanted byproduct of oil production. In the 1870s, steel pipe replaced cast iron. In 1883, Pittsburgh became the first major city supplied with natural gas. Other cities followed, but only if they were close to natural gas wells. Because natural gas was a byproduct, it was priced cheaply and, where available, undercut the market for town gas. In 1891, one of the longest pipelines of the time was built, a 120-mile long pipeline from the gas fields of Indiana to Chicago, without compression.

Long-distance high-pressure gas pipelines became feasible after oxyacetylene welding was introduced in 1911, and especially after electric arc welding became popular in the 1920s. This allowed remote gas deposits to be supplied to big cities. Natural gas increasingly became a sought-after commodity.

=== Price regulation ===
The prices charged by utilities delivering natural gas to customers have always been subject to state regulation. With the construction of interstate gas pipelines in the 1920s and 1930s, city utilities became dependent on natural gas supplies beyond the regulatory power of state and local governments. In 1935, the federal trade commission, believing that interstate pipelines had too much power to control the downstream gas market, recommended federal controls. Congress passed the Natural Gas Act of 1938 to regulate the rates charged by interstate pipelines.

Federal regulations at first included only the rates interstate pipelines charged to carry gas. When the market price of natural gas at the wellhead increased in the 1950s, gas utilities complained that the gas producers should be regulated as well. In 1954, the US Supreme Court ruled in Phillips Petroleum Co. v. Wisconsin that regulation of the wellhead price was within the intent of the Natural Gas Act of 1938 to control prices to utilities, and therefore the federal government could control wellhead prices of any natural gas going into an interstate pipeline.

By the early 1970s, the artificially low price set by the federal government had created a shortage, but only of interstate gas. Gas consumed within the state where it was produced was plentiful, but more expensive. By 1975, about half the natural gas produced went to the intrastate market. In 1975 and 1976, some schools and factories in the Midwest shut down periodically when the local utility could not find any natural gas to buy at the controlled price. The Federal Power Commission tried to allocate the scarce gas by identifying "high-priority" and "low-priority" customers, but this caused extensive litigation.

The federal government responded to gas shortages with the Natural Gas Policy Act of 1978, which both increased federal regulation by extending price controls to all existing natural gas wells and promised to end price controls on all new wells by 1985. Under the new rules, natural gas was subject to a complicated set of prices, depending on when the well was drilled, the size of the company that owned the well, the permeability of the formation, and the distance of the well from previous wells. Gas production from some types of gas reservoirs received tax subsidies. In 1976, the federal government established the Eastern Gas Shales Project, a large research effort to find ways to produce gas from shale.

Price controls grew even more complex with the Energy Act of 1980, which exempted Devonian gas shales (shales deposited during the Devonian geologic period) from price controls (but not gas shales deposited during other geologic periods), as well as low-permeability formations and coalbed methane. In addition, production from these sources earned tax credits for the producers for qualified wells drilled before January 1, 1992; the tax credits expired at the end of 2002.

The Natural Gas Wellhead Decontrol Act of 1989 mandated that all remaining price controls on natural gas were to be eliminated as of January 1, 1993.

=== Shortages and surplus ===
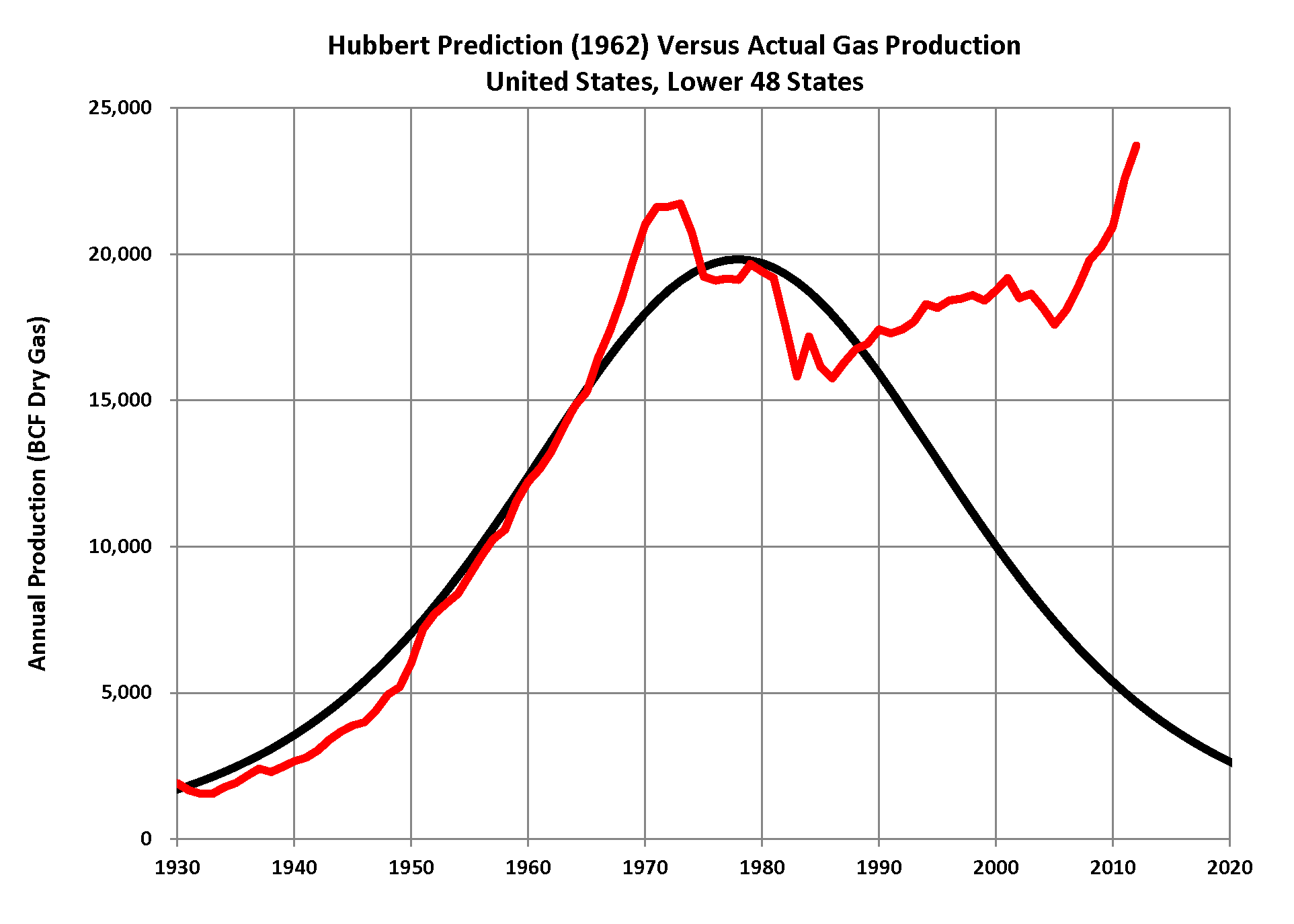
Hubbert's 1962 peak gas prediction (black) versus actual U.S. lower-48 state gas production (red)

As with petroleum, the future supply of natural gas has long been the subject of concern and predictions of shortages. In 1952, Dr. Edward Steidle, Dean of the School of Mineral Industries at Pennsylvania State College, predicted that gas production would soon decline significantly from 1952 rates, so that gas would cease to be a significant energy source by 2002, and possibly as early as 1975.

In 1956, M. King Hubbert used an estimated ultimate recovery (EUR) of 850 trillion cubic feet (24,000 km^{3}) (an amount postulated by geologist Wallace Pratt) to predict a U.S. production peak of about 14 trillion cubic feet (400 km^{3}) per year to occur "approximately 1970". Pratt, in his EUR estimate (p. 96), explicitly included what he called the "phenomenal discovery rate" that the industry was then experiencing in the offshore Gulf of Mexico.

U.S. marketed gas production reached a peak in 1973 at about 22.6 trillion cubic feet (640 km^{3}), and declined to a low of 16.9 trillion cubic feet (480 km^{3}) in 1986. But then, instead of declining further as predicted by the Hubbert curve, natural gas production rose slowly but steadily for the next 15 years and reached 20.6 TCF in 2001. Then it dropped again for a few years, and in 2005 was down to 18.9 TCF.

After 2005, natural gas production rose rapidly, exceeded its old 1973 peak, and set new records for high production in each year 2011, 2012, 2013, 2014, and 2015, when marketed production was 28.8 trillion cubic feet (820 km^{3}).

== International trade ==
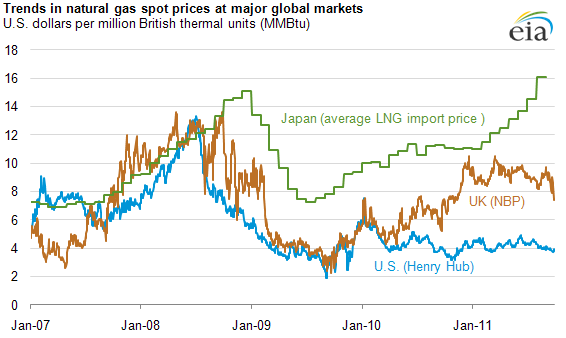
Comparison of natural gas prices in Japan, United Kingdom, and United States, 2007–2011

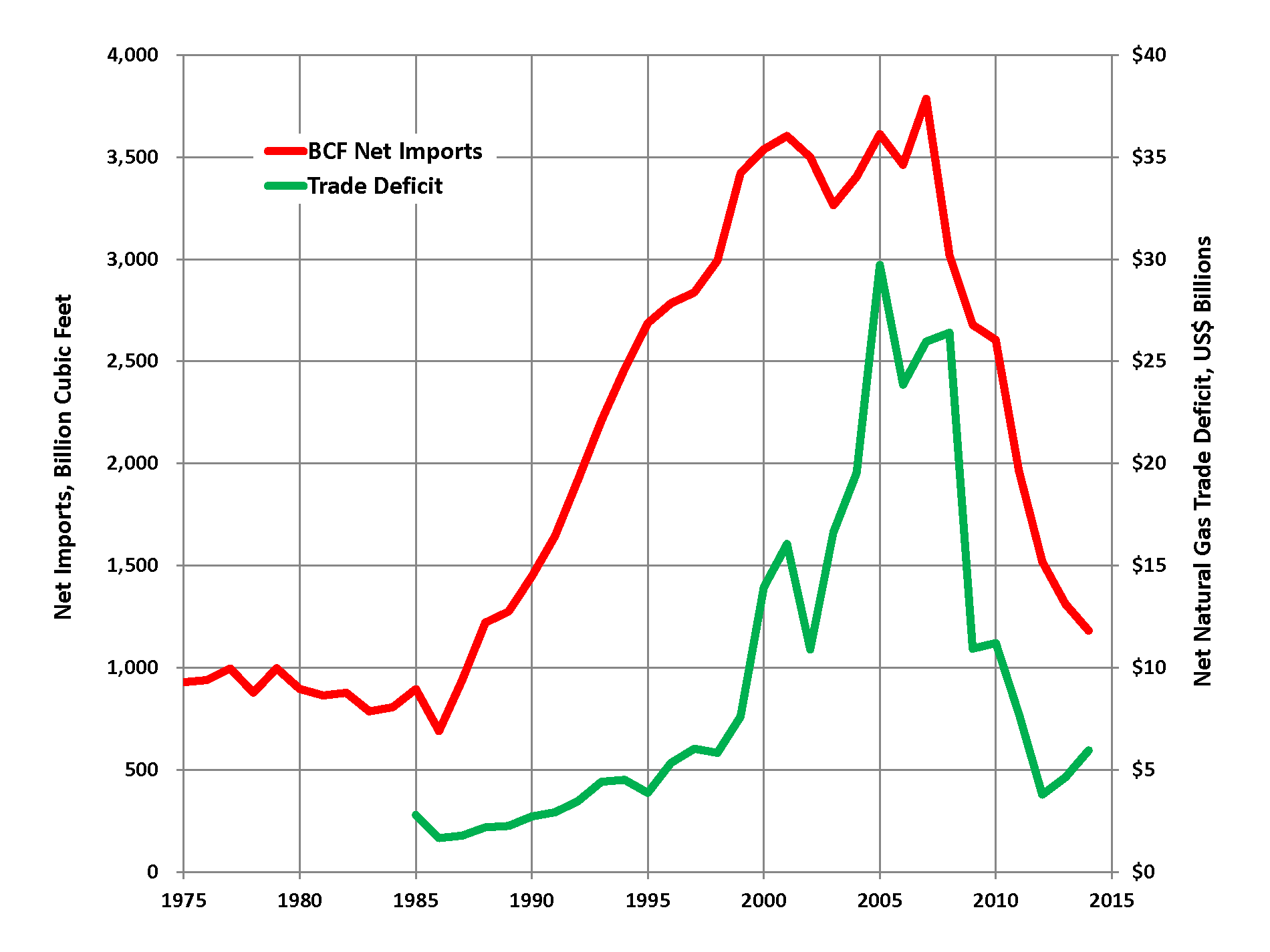
Net annual natural gas imports (imports minus exports) to the United States, 1975-2013. Data from U.S. Energy Information Administration website.

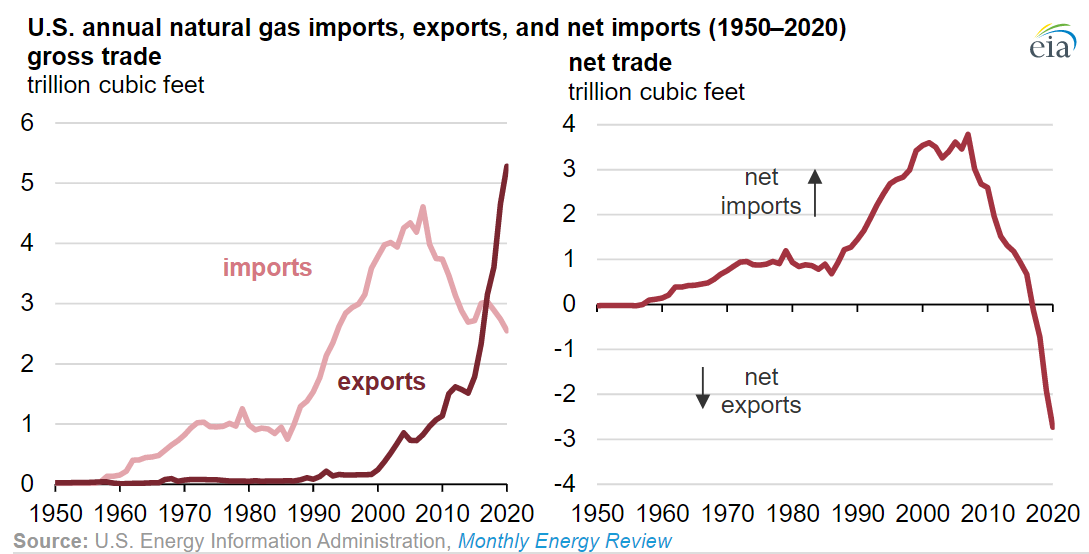
U.S. trade in natural gas, 1950–2020. The US became a net exporter of natural gas in 2017.

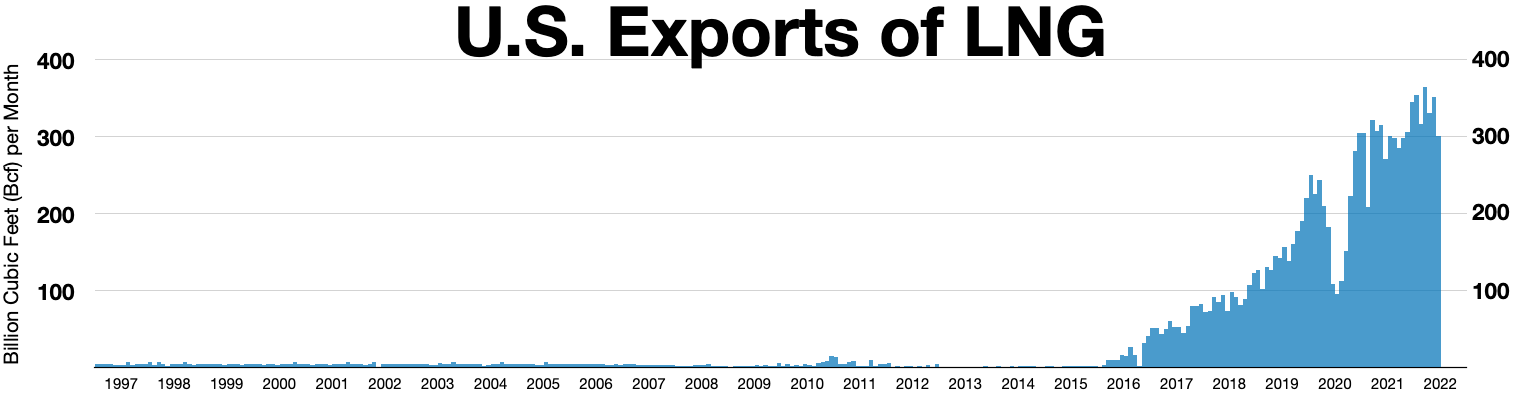
U.S. LNG exports 1997–2022

Natural gas capacity and exports LNG export capacity Calcasieu Pass Elba Island Freeport Cameron Corpus Christi Cove Point Sabine Pass

In 2017, the United States became a net exporter of natural gas annually for the first time since 1957. Net exports averaged 0.4 billion cubic feet per day. The US Energy Information Administration projected that net exports would grow to 4.6 billion cubic feet per day in 2019. Export growth was driven by pipeline exports to Mexico and Canada, although the U.S. continued to import more from Canada than it exported to that country. In addition, exports of liquefied natural gas increased.

Natural gas depends on pipelines for economical transport. Without pipeline connections, natural gas must be transported as liquefied natural gas (LNG), an expensive process. For this reason, the price of natural gas tends to differ between regions not connected by gas pipelines. The North American market, comprising Canada, Mexico, and the United States, all connected by a common pipeline network, has had much lower gas prices in recent years than some other major world gas markets, such as Europe (since 2010), Japan (since 2008), and Korea.

The United States is connected by pipeline to Canada and Mexico. The U.S. has long imported large quantities of gas from Canada, and exported smaller quantities to some parts of eastern Canada. In 2014, the U.S. imported 2,634 BCF from Canada and exported 769 BCF, so that net imports from Canada totaled 1,865 BCF. The United States has exported increasing volumes to Mexico over the past decade. In 2014, the U.S. exported 728.5 BCF to Mexico and imported 1.4 BCF, so that net exports to Mexico totaled 727 BCF.

The cost of net imports peaked at US$29.7 billion in 2005; the cost of net imports was $5.9 billion in 2014.

=== Liquified natural gas ===
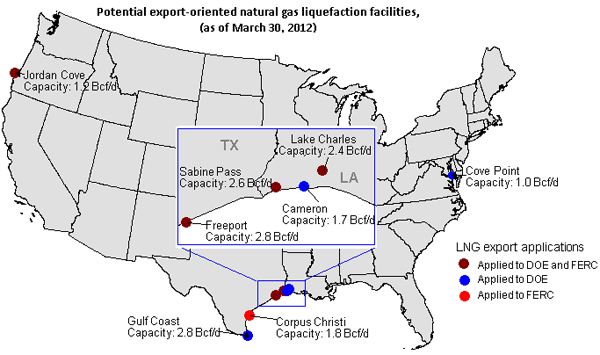
Proposed LNG export terminals in the U.S., 2012 (US Energy Information Administration)

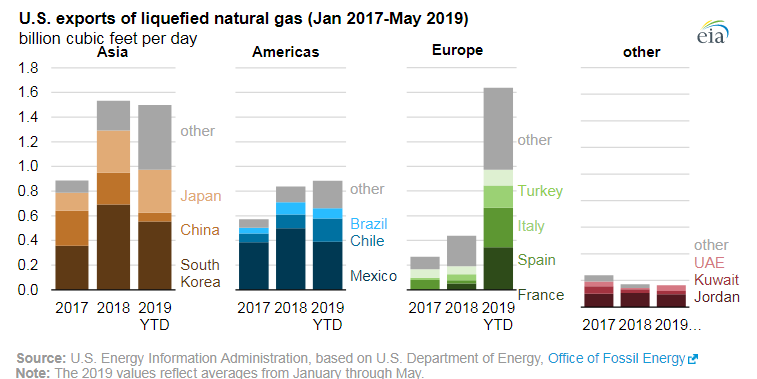
U.S. liquified natural gas export destinations, January 2017–May 2019

The United States became a net exporter of liquified natural gas in 2016. Principal markets for US LNG are Mexico, South Korea, China, and Japan. In late 2021, U.S. producer Venture Global LNG signed three long-term supply deals with China's state-owned Sinopec to supply liquefied natural gas. China's imports of U.S. natural gas will more than double. U.S. exports of liquefied natural gas to China and other Asian countries surged in 2021, with Asian buyers willing to pay higher prices than European importers.

In past years, when experts were projecting gas shortages in North America, utility companies built liquified natural gas (LNG) import terminals along the coast. Net imports of LNG peaked in 2007, but have since decreased. In 2014, the U.S. imported 59 BCF of LNG gas and exported 16 BCF, so that net LNG imports amounted to 43 BCF. Most imported LNG was from Trinidad and Tobago.

Long-term LNG contracts usually tie the price of LNG to the oil price.

In 2010, after the price of U.S. natural gas fell below that of world markets, U.S. companies proposed establishing several LNG export terminals. Many of these proposals involve converting inactive LNG import terminals to handle LNG exports. Any proposals to export natural gas must be approved by the US Federal Energy Regulatory Commission (FERC), which gives its approval only if the project receives a satisfactory environmental review, and if FERC finds that the export terminal would be in the public interest. As of August 2015, 24 new LNG export terminals have been proposed, of which FERC has so far approved 6. Cheniere Energy expects to export LNG through its Sabine Pass terminal in January 2016.

As of 2014, the only active LNG export terminal in the U.S. was in Kenai, Alaska. The plant, with a capacity of 0.2 BCF per day, is owned by ConocoPhillips and has been exporting LNG since 1969. Most exported LNG went to Japan.

The New England States are connected by pipeline to the rest of the U.S. and to Canada, but the existing pipelines do not supply the winter demand. For this reason, a quarter of New England's demand for gas is supplied by more-expensive LNG. Four LNG import terminals serve New England, but most LNG imported to New England arrives through the Everett terminal in Boston, and the Canaport terminal in New Brunswick, Canada. As of 2015, pipelines were under construction to carry cheaper gas from Pennsylvania to New England.

In 2023, exports of LNG from the United States increased by 12% from the previous year, reaching an average of 13.6 billion cubic feet per day (Bcf/d) in December, and contributing to a record annual total of 20.9 Bcf/d for all natural gas exports. This increase in LNG exports played a significant role, with the U.S. providing nearly half of Europe's LNG imports for the year. Meanwhile, overall U.S. natural gas imports decreased by 3% to 8.0 Bcf/d, largely due to milder winter temperatures and disruptions from wildfires in western Canada, which led to a 9% reduction in imports during April and May compared to the same months in 2022. U.S. LNG imports remained minimal, below 0.1 Bcf/d, primarily servicing the New England market during peak demand periods, especially in the winter. In early 2026, Saudi Arabia signed a 20-year deal to receive 1 million tonnes of LNG per year from the USA.

== See also ==
- Alaska LNG Project and Alaska gas pipeline
- Energy in the United States
- Fracking in the United States
- Petroleum in the United States
- Shale gas in the United States
