= Natural gas in Alaska =

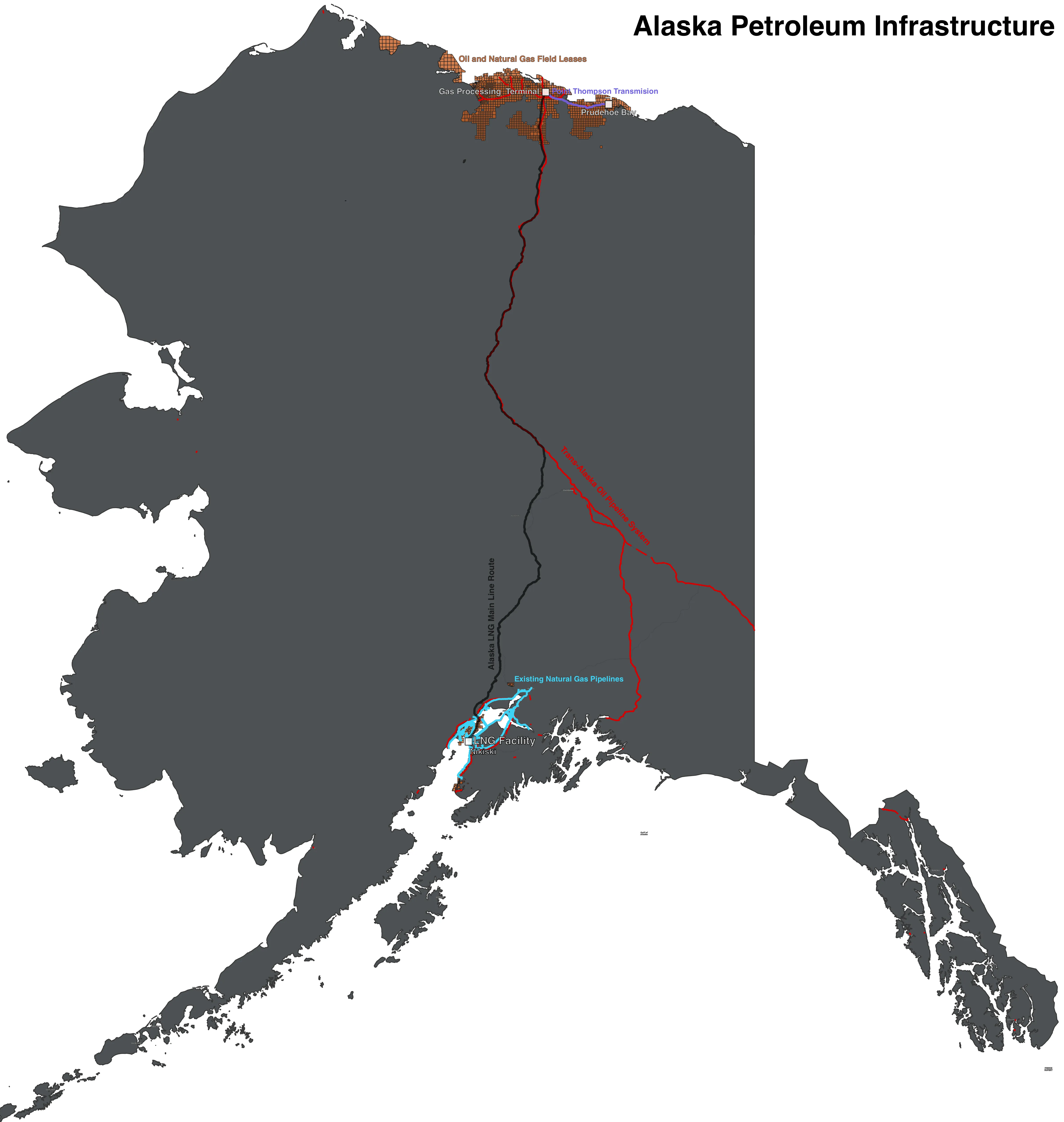
Alaska oil and natural gas pipelines, and proposed natural gas pipelines.

The state of Alaska is both a producer and consumer of natural gas. In 2006, Alaska consumed 180.4 Bcf of natural gas.

== Location ==
Alaskan gas wells are located in two regions. The largest source is the North Slope area around Prudhoe Bay where gas was discovered along with oil in 1968. In 1974 the State of Alaska's Division of Geological & Geophysical Surveys estimated that the field held 26×10^{12} cu ft (740 km^{3}) of natural gas. Because there is no way to transport the Prudhoe Bay gas to markets, as gas comes out of the wells, it is separated from the oil stream and reinjected into the ground to maintain the oil reservoir pressures. There are several proposals to transport the Prudhoe Bay gas. See, Alaska Gas Pipeline.

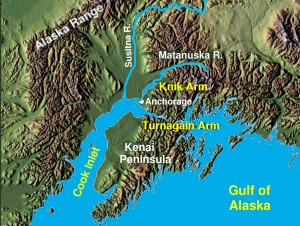
Cook Inlet, showing Knik and Turnagain Arms

The second source is located on the Kenai Peninsula on the South coast of Alaska. There are probable gas reserves of 1,726.4 Bcf in this area. Most of this gas is exported to Japan through a liquefied natural gas terminal located on the Cook Inlet. The Cook Inlet basin contains large oil and gas deposits including several offshore fields.

== Operators ==
As of 2005, there were 16 platforms in Cook Inlet, the oldest of which was the XTO A platform first installed by Shell in 1964, and newest of which was the Kitchen Lights Unit platform installed by Crowley and supported by the German engineering and project management companies Heavylift@Sea, Overdick and Projektbox installed in 2015. Most of the platforms have been operated by Union Oil, which was acquired by Chevron in 2005. There are also numerous oil and gas pipelines running around and under the Cook Inlet. The main destinations of the gas pipelines are to Kenai where the gas is primarily used to fuel commercial fertilizer production and a LPG plant and to Anchorage, where the gas is consumed largely for domestic uses. ConocoPhillips and Marathon have been operating the LNG terminal under a series of two-year-long licenses issued by the U.S. Department of Energy under Section 3 of the Natural Gas Act. When these companies applied for another two-year extension of the license, various Alaskan entities, including the local fertilizer plant opposed the application on the grounds that there was not sufficient gas to meet local requirements as well as the proposed exports. The Agrium fertilizer plant claimed it closed, because it could not obtain a gas supply. On June 3, 2008, the Department of Energy (DOE) granted the extension having found that there were sufficient supplies for Alaska's needs.

On 22 July 2014, the Alaska LNG project submitted an application to export LNG to the DOE. The Alaska LNG project participants are the Alaska Gasline Development Corp. (AGDC) and affiliates of TransCanada, BP, ConocoPhillips, and ExxonMobil. They confirmed that the Alaska LNG project would seek to export up to 20 million tpa of LNG for a period of 30 years to countries with existing free trade agreements (FTA) with the US, as well as to non-FTA countries. The project was anticipated to create up to 15,000 jobs during construction and about 1000 jobs for operation of the project. As of 2014 the LNG project was in the pre-front-end engineering and design phase, which was expected to be completed in 2016.

== Delivered to Consumers ==
Share of total US gas consumption (percentage)
Use	2001	2002	2003	2004	2004	2006
Residential	0.35	0.33	0.33	0.37	0.37	0.47
Commercial	0.52	0.50	0.54	0.59	0.56	0.65
Industrial	0.92	0.88	0.58	0.65	0.80	0.58
Vehicle Fuel	0.09	0.08	0.09	0.09	0.17	0.17
Electric Power	0.61	0.56	0.67	0.69	0.67	0.70

== Gas pipeline ==
The state of Alaska has adopted legislation which would provide $500 million of start-up funding for a new pipeline to transport Prudhoe Bay gas. The selected proposal from TransCanada Corp. would go through Canada without connecting to the existing natural gas system in Southern Alaska. However, three Boroughs have formed the Alaskan Gasline Port Authority to build a line from Prudhoe Bay to Valdez that would connect to the existing system.

The gas pipeline has emerged as an issue in the 2008 United States elections, because Alaskan Governor Sarah Palin has cited her actions on the gas pipeline as evidence of "standing up to Big Oil" while her opponents claim it is a political reward to her political supporter TransCanada Corp.

== See also ==
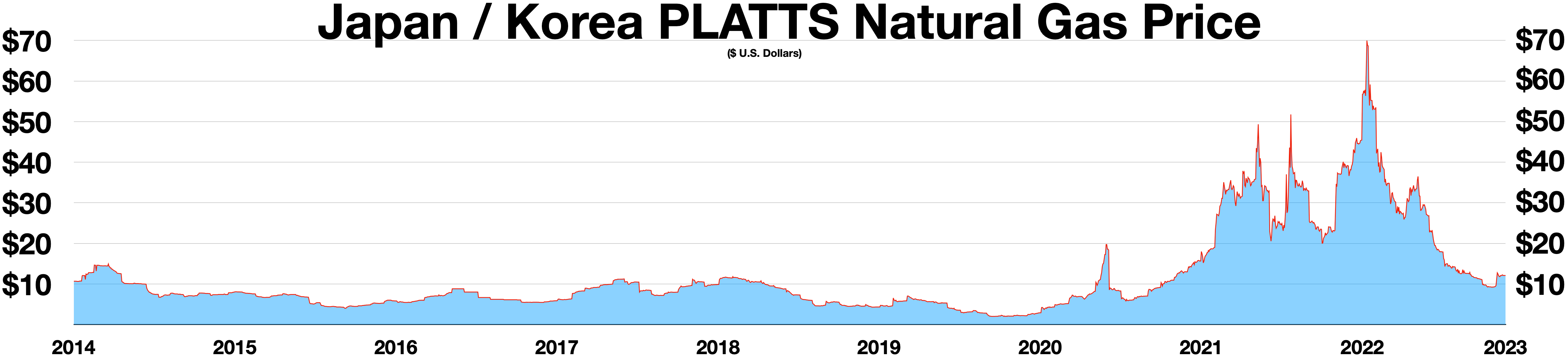
Japan - Korea PLATTS natural gas price

- Alaska LNG
