= Alaska LNG =

Proposed natural gas pipeline and liquefaction project in Alaska

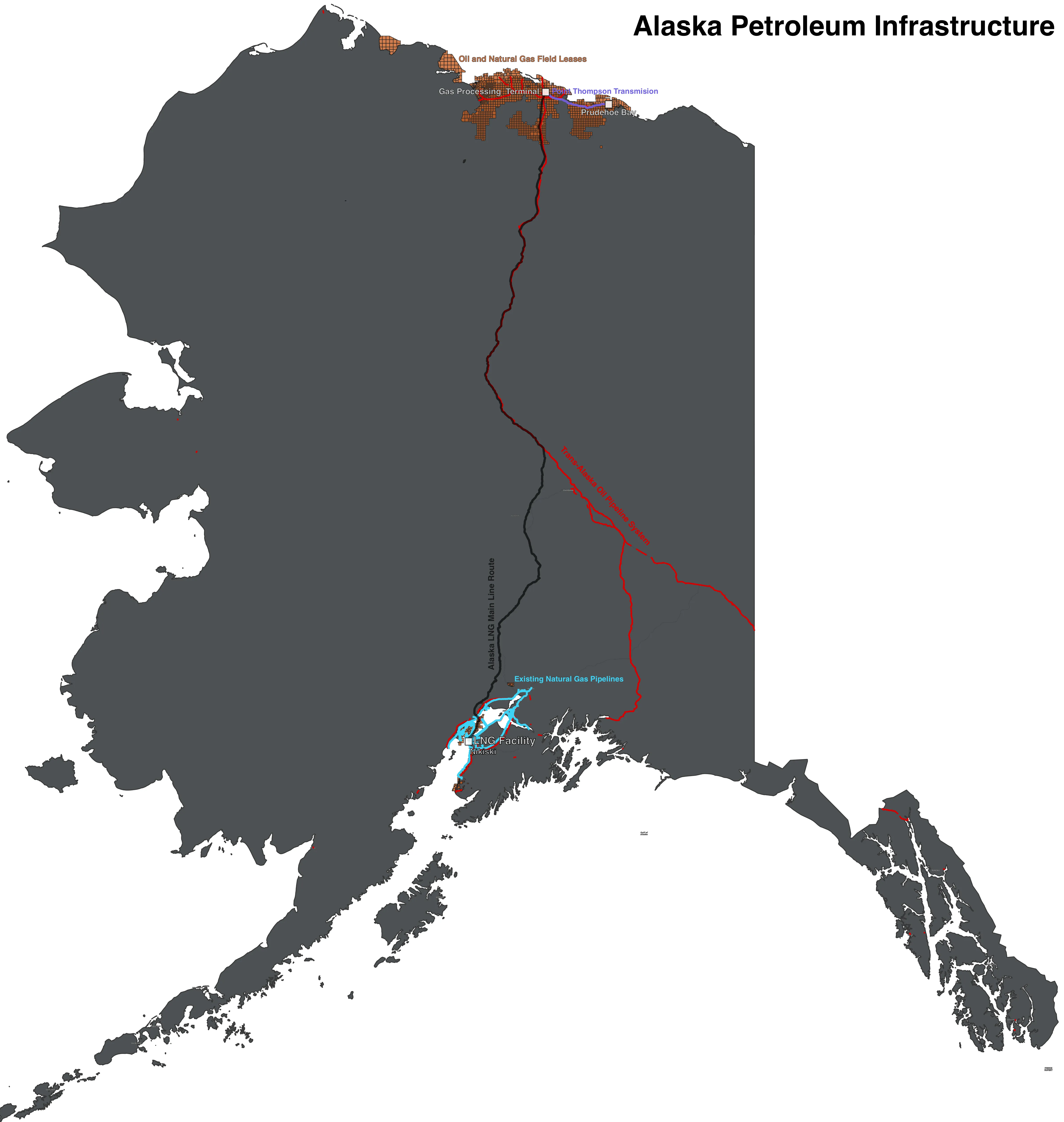
- Alaska petroleum infrastructure

Location
- Country: United States
- State: Alaska
- Direction: North–South
- Start: Prudhoe Bay, North Slope
- To: Nikiski, Kenai Peninsula

General information
- Type: Natural gas pipeline and LNG
- Status: Proposed
- Operator: Alaska Gasline Development Corporation (AGDC)

Technical information
- Length: 807 mi (1,299 km)
- Maximum discharge: ~3.5 Bcf/day
- Diameter: 42 in (1,067 mm)
- No. of compressor stations: 8

Alaska LNG is a proposed liquefied natural gas (LNG) and natural gas pipeline project in the U.S. state of Alaska. The pipeline would be approximately 807-miles (1,299 km) from Prudhoe Bay on the North Slope to a planned LNG export terminal in Nikiski, on the Kenai Peninsula. The project is managed by the Alaska Gasline Development Corporation (AGDC), a state-owned entity.

== History ==
Originally proposed in the early 2000s, the project has gone through several iterations. Major oil companies including ExxonMobil, BP, and ConocoPhillips were originally partners. The project received its final Environmental impact statement from the Federal Energy Regulatory Commission in 2020. The old Kenai LNG plant operated for 48 years and ceased operations in 2017.

== Overview ==
Alaska LNG is intended to commercialize Alaska's North Slope gas resources, transporting ~3.5 billion cubic feet of natural gas per day (Bcf/d) from the Prudhoe Bay and Point Thomson fields. The gas would be transported via a buried, 42-inch pipeline and then liquefied at a facility in Nikiski for export to global markets. There would be connections to local natural gas infrastructure in southern Alaska for instate natural gas needs also. The route would follow much of the Trans-Alaska Oil Pipeline System in northern Alaska. The project is estimated to cost $44 billion and export 20 million tonnes of LNG a year.

On September 28, 2026, the Trump administration and top Alaskan officials announced that South Korea would fund the pipeline with $50 billion. South Korea's Industry Ministry said no such agreement existed and that they had agreed to initiate a review of a potential pipeline deal. A joint fact sheet released by the Commerce Department did not mention an investment, saying merely that the two countries would "commence working" on the project "subject to certain commercial requirements".

== See also ==
- Energy in Alaska
- Green methanol
- Jordan Cove Energy Project – was a proposed LNG facility in Oregon
- List of natural gas pipelines
- List of LNG terminals
- List of countries by natural gas proven reserves
- LNG Canada
- Natural gas in Alaska
- Natural gas in the United States
- Natural gas prices
- Natural-gas processing
- Prudhoe Bay Oil Field
- BP Prudhoe Bay Royalty Trust
- Strategic natural gas reserve
- Trans-Alaska Pipeline System
