= Alaska gas pipeline =

Proposed natural gas pipeline

Location
- Country: United States, Canada
- Direction: north–south
- Start: Alaska North Slope
- To: Calgary, Alberta
- Runs alongside: Alaska Highway

General information
- Type: natural gas
- Partners: TransCanada Corp. ExxonMobil

Technical information
- Length: 1,715 mi (2,760 km)
- Maximum discharge: 41 billion cubic meter per year

The Alaska gas pipeline was a joint project of TransCanada Corp. and ExxonMobil Corp. to develop a natural gas pipeline under the AGIA, a.k.a. the Alaska Gas Inducement Act, adopted by Alaska Legislature in 2007. The project originally proposed two options during its open season offering over a three-month period from April 30 to July 30, 2010. An 'open season' in layman's terms is when a company conducts a non-binding show of interest or poll in the marketplace, they ask potential customers "if we build it, will you come?".

The first option was a pipeline from the Alaska North Slope through Alaska, the Yukon Territory, and British Columbia, and down to Alberta for a total distance of approx. 1,700 miles. Gas was then to be delivered through existing pipelines serving the major North American markets.

The second option proposed was to transport natural gas from the North Slope to Valdez, AK, for a distance of approx. 800 miles. Once in Valdez, it would be converted to liquified natural gas in LNG plants built by others and then shipped to North American and international markets. An additional component to each option was a gas treatment plant (GTP) and Point Thomson natural gas pipeline. The proposed building site for the GTP would be at the North Slope's Prudhoe Bay facilities, which then would treat the gas to be shipped in the pipeline. The Point Thomson field would have approximately 58 miles of pipeline to connect natural gas supplies from the field to the plant and the pipeline.

Both options would give Alaskan communities the opportunity to acquire natural gas from a minimum of five delivery points along the pipeline. An Alberta option would provide local natural gas delivery in Canada. TransCanada secured state seed money and a license from the state of Alaska to build and operate a pipeline, but did not yet have federal approvals needed to start construction. In June 2009, TransCanada announced an agreement with ExxonMobil to work together in bringing the gas to market.

In May 2012 TransCanada formally closed their open season. TransCanada's license with the AGIA required that they file a complete application with the Federal Energy Regulatory Commission in October 2012 for a certificate to build and operate the pipeline. In May 2012 the state of Alaska granted TransCanada a two-year postponement of the deadline to give them more time to explore the best market for Alaska gas. By the summer of 2014 the project became more focused on export, so the state and TransCanada terminated their AGIA agreement.

== History ==
=== Initial evaluations ===
Large natural gas reserves were discovered in Prudhoe Bay in 1967. Talk of a pipeline peaked during the 1973 OPEC oil embargo and several companies came out in favor of large pipeline projects. Canadian Arctic Gas Pipeline, Ltd.—a consortium of large oil companies including Shell, Exxon, and TransCanada—proposed a route from Alaska's Prudhoe Bay across northern Yukon to the Mackenzie Delta, and then south through the Mackenzie Valley to Alberta. In addition, the Foothills Pipeline consortium pursued a competing Mackenzie Valley Pipeline, starting at the Mackenzie Delta and also running along the river valley to Alberta. Either proposal required the approval of the Canadian government, which named Thomas Berger to lead an inquiry into the proposals. Berger's inquiry resulted in a recommendation for a ten-year moratorium on development of the pipeline to deal with issues such as Aboriginal land claims and setting aside of conservation areas.

In the United States, three competing applications were filed with the Federal Power Commission to construct a natural gas pipeline from Prudhoe Bay. A proposal sponsored by El Paso Corporation routed the pipeline to Valdez along the oil pipeline route with LNG tankers then transporting the gas to terminals on the west coast. The other two proposals would cross Canada on a route parallel to the Alaska Highway. The Federal Power Commission conducted lengthy hearings on the relative merits of the three plans, and under the Natural Gas Act the commission had the legal right to select the final route. Following the 1976 elections where John McMillian, CEO of Northwest Pipeline was a major supporter of Jimmy Carter, President Carter proposed special legislation to transfer the task of selecting a project from the Federal Power Commission to the President. Congress adopted the Alaska Natural Gas Transportation Act of 1977, and Carter selected the project sponsored by Northwest to the exclusion of the other two projects. The Commission then proceeded to conduct further proceedings to issue certificates of public convenience and necessity to authorize construction of pipelines from Prudhoe Bay and extending to San Francisco and Chicago, and the United States and Canada entered into an agreement regarding having the gas pipeline follow the Alaskan Highway route.

In 1981 to 1982 test sites were built at 7 locations next to the oil pipeline over a 600-mile spread with pipes buried in the ground circulating a glycol solution to simulate gas flowing in the pipes chilled to 10 Deg F. to study the effects on the permafrost and collect temperature and movement data. This was built over a two-year period and ran for another 2 years. Data was stored on cassette tapes and changed weekly, which was high-tech at the time. The data was used to help with building the new gas pipeline which was to be buried instead of above ground like the oil pipeline. The tests were also verified in labs as late as 1991, 10 years later. Building an LNG facility would not work in the North Slope as there is only a 3-month window for tankers to move the gas.

Ultimately, Northwest's consortium could not finance the project, and instead decided to "prebuild" the segments from Alberta to San Francisco and Chicago. Northwest justified the prebuild on the theory that using Canadian gas to depreciate the pipeline for a period of years would make the transportation of Alaskan gas more economic at a later date. The prebuild system went into service under the names Pacific Gas Transmission and Northern Border Pipeline. Subsequently, an affiliate of TransCanada Pipeline acquired Pacific Gas Transmission and 50% of Northern Border. Northwest was acquired by the Williams Companies . As a result, Northwest was no longer willing to pursue the full project to Prudhoe Bay.

=== All-Alaskan Pipeline ===
Former Secretary of Interior Wally Hickel headed a consortium in 1981 which sought to revive the El Paso proposal to construct an 800-mile gas pipeline along the oil pipeline route from Prudhoe Bay to Valdez (with a branch to Anchorage), because such a route would also serve Anchorage and Fairbanks and would have a much lower construction cost than the overland pipeline routes. The remaining gas would be exported as LNG. Competitors argued that this proposal was barred by the 1977 statute and President Carter's decision. The consortium argued that because the pipeline would be used for intrastate commerce and foreign commerce, but not for interstate commerce, the project would not require Federal approvals under the Natural Gas Act. Three Alaskan boroughs voted to form the Alaskan Gasline Port Authority (AGPA) to promote this project under Alaska Code § 29.35.600.

Following Alaska's decision to contribute $500 million to fund startup costs of an overland route in 2008, the AGPA was advocating a "Y" route which would first go to Valdez and later build a second fork toward Canada.

=== Alaska Gasline Inducement Act ===
In July 2007, the Governor of Alaska Sarah Palin announced that the State of Alaska was ready to receive applications to build a pipeline within the framework of the Alaska Gasline Inducement Act (AGIA). On January 4, 2008, a proposal by TransCanada was selected. Four other proposals were submitted: By Sinopec, AEnergia, the AGPA, which proposed a liquified natural gas project, and the Alaska Natural Gas Development Authority.

In January 2008, Palin announced that the Canadian company TransCanada Corp., was the sole AGIA-compliant applicant. On August 27, 2008, Palin signed a bill into law giving the state of Alaska authority to award TransCanada Corp. 500 million dollars in seed money and a license to build and operate the $26-billion pipeline to transport natural gas from the North Slope to the Lower 48, through Canada.

The license is not a construction contract, and federal energy regulators must approve the project before it can go forward.

On December 5, 2008, the AGIA license, jointly awarded to Foothills Pipe Lines Ltd. and TransCanada Alaska, LLC, was signed in Fairbanks.

The pipeline proposed by TransCanada would have run 1,715 miles (2,760 km) from the North Slope to Calgary in Alberta. It was expected to cost US$26 billion and to be operational by 2018.

In 2014, the agreement between Alaska and Transcanada was cancelled in the light of substantially lower prices for natural gas and increased use of extraction technology that has markedly boosted supply, making the pipeline arrangement uneconomic. The 500 million dollars in seed money was forfeited by the State legally to Transcanada under a cancellation clause for front end engineering and design work completed.

== Denali proposal ==
Outside of the AGIA process, authorities were evaluating a separate proposal issued by Denali – The Alaska Gas Pipeline LLC, a joint venture of ConocoPhillips and BP. ExxonMobil was invited to participate in the project. Also Enbridge, Royal Dutch Shell and Gazprom had shown interest to join this project. However, on 17 May 2011 Denali announced that it ended developing the project due lack of interest from potential customers.

The project foresaw a pipeline with a capacity of 41 billion cubic meter (bcm) of natural gas per year down the Alaska Highway across Alaska, through the Yukon and British Columbia into Alberta. It also consisted of a gas treatment plant on North Slope. The project was estimated to cost US$35 billion.

A shorter alternative route, which was considered in the 1970s, would link Prudhoe Bay natural gas through Mackenzie River Valley.

== Politics ==
Opposition to the Alaska natural gas pipeline route mandate and price supports came from both the Bush administration and the Canadian government. In a letter to the Sen. Domenici, Secretary of Energy Spencer Abraham wrote, "[The administration] believes market forces should select the route of the pipeline." He continued, "The administration strongly opposes the price-floor tax credit provision in the Senate energy bill and any similar provisions." Abraham suggested several non-price support tax provisions that could subsidize the construction of the pipeline. Former Canadian Ambassador to the United States Michael Kergin wrote that Canada is of the opinion that the Alaskan pipeline should be built without subsidies and without the route being determined by legislation.

The pipeline required Canadian authorities to strike a deal with First Nations whose lands are in the pipeline route, and who were accusing Palin and other pipeline proponents of treating them with disrespect by not consulting with them.

The late Governor Wally Hickel advocated an "All-Alaskan" route which would go from Prudhoe Bay to Valdez and would bring gas to Fairbanks and Anchorage. He opposed the award of the route to TransCanada which would not result in gas service for Alaska's population centers.

In June 2009 Alaska Governor Sarah Palin was interviewed on The Today Show by Matt Lauer. She expressed her support for the pipeline, which was ostensibly the purpose of her appearance on the program.

== See also ==
- Jordan Cove Energy Project — proposed LNG terminal on the West Coast in Oregon
- Alaska LNG Project
- Natural gas in Alaska
- Office of the Federal Coordinator, Alaska Natural Gas Transportation Projects
- Trans-Alaska Pipeline System
