= Vermilion Peak (British Columbia) =

Mountain in British Columbia, Canada

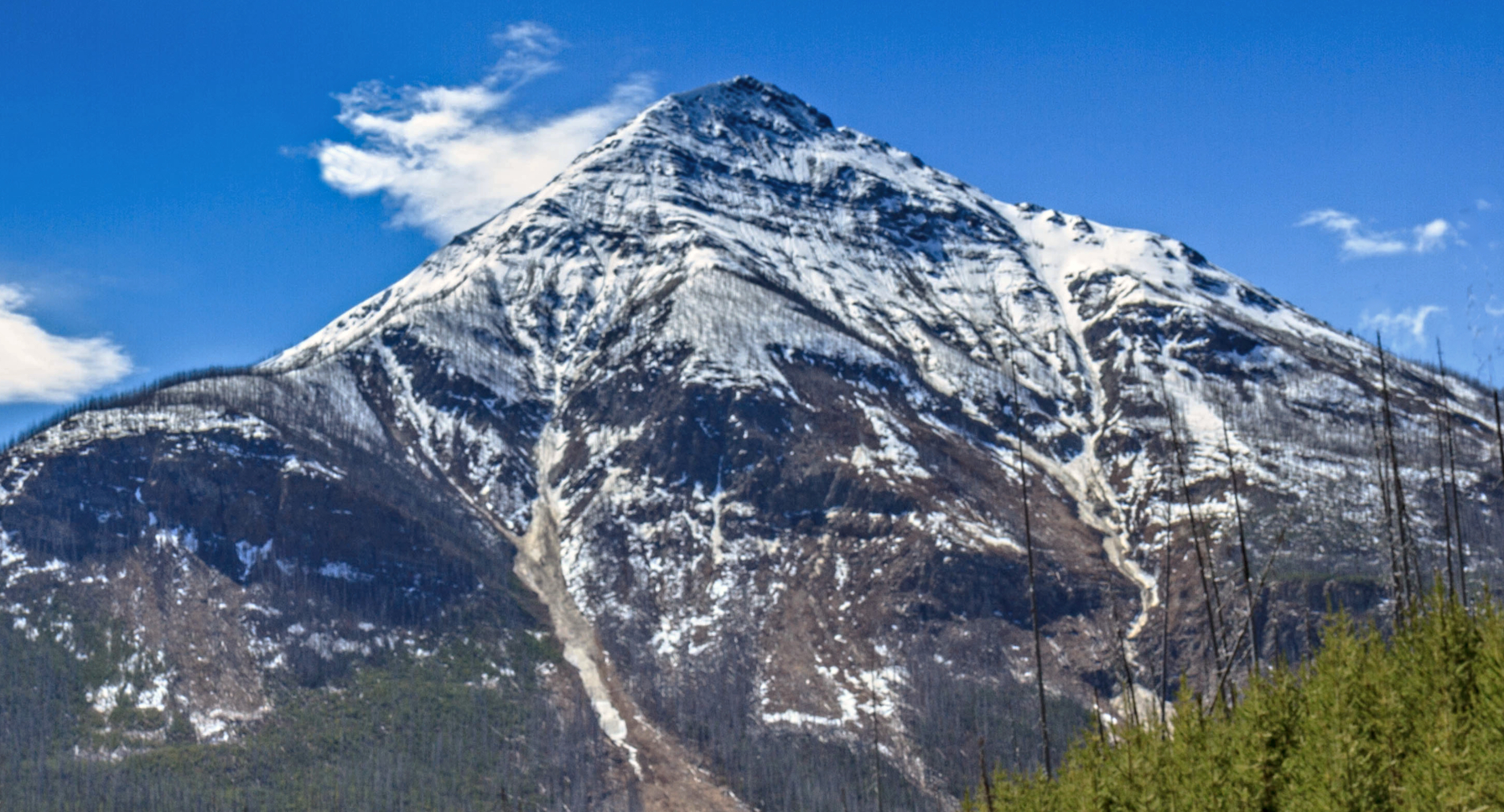
- Vermilion Peak, north aspect

Highest point
- Elevation: 2,647 m (8,684 ft)
- Prominence: 448 m (1,470 ft)
- Parent peak: Mount Ball (3294 m)
- Listing: Mountains of British Columbia
- Coordinates: 51°09′43″N 116°07′04″W

Geography
- Location within British Columbia Location within Canada
- Interactive map of Vermilion Peak
- Location: Kootenay National Park; British Columbia, Canada
- District: Kootenay Land District
- Parent range: Ball Range; Canadian Rockies
- Topo map: NTS 82N1 Mount Goodsir

Climbing
- Easiest route: Scrambling

Vermilion Peak is a 2,647-metre (8,684-foot) mountain summit located in the Vermilion River Valley of Kootenay National Park, in British Columbia, Canada. It is part of the Ball Range, which is a sub-range of the Canadian Rockies. Its nearest higher peak is Stanley Peak, 2.8 km (1.7 mi) to the east. Vermilion Peak can be seen from the Banff–Windermere Parkway as it traverses the base of the mountain.

== History ==
Vermilion Peak stands to the east of the ochre beds along Ochre Creek that the Ktunaxa First Nations discovered and used for trading. The Ktunaxa would convert the ochre into red oxide, calling it vermilion. Vermilion Peak takes its name from this. The mountain's name was officially adopted April 3, 1952, by the Geographical Names Board of Canada.

== Geology ==
Vermilion Peak is composed of drag-folded rocks of the Goodsir Group, a sedimentary rock laid down during the Precambrian to Jurassic periods and pushed east and over the top of younger rock during the Laramide orogeny.

== Climate ==
Based on the Köppen climate classification, Vermilion Peak has an alpine climate with cold, snowy winters, and mild summers. Temperatures can drop below −20 °C with wind chill factors below −30 °C. Precipitation runoff from the mountain drains into tributaries of the Vermilion River.

== Gallery ==
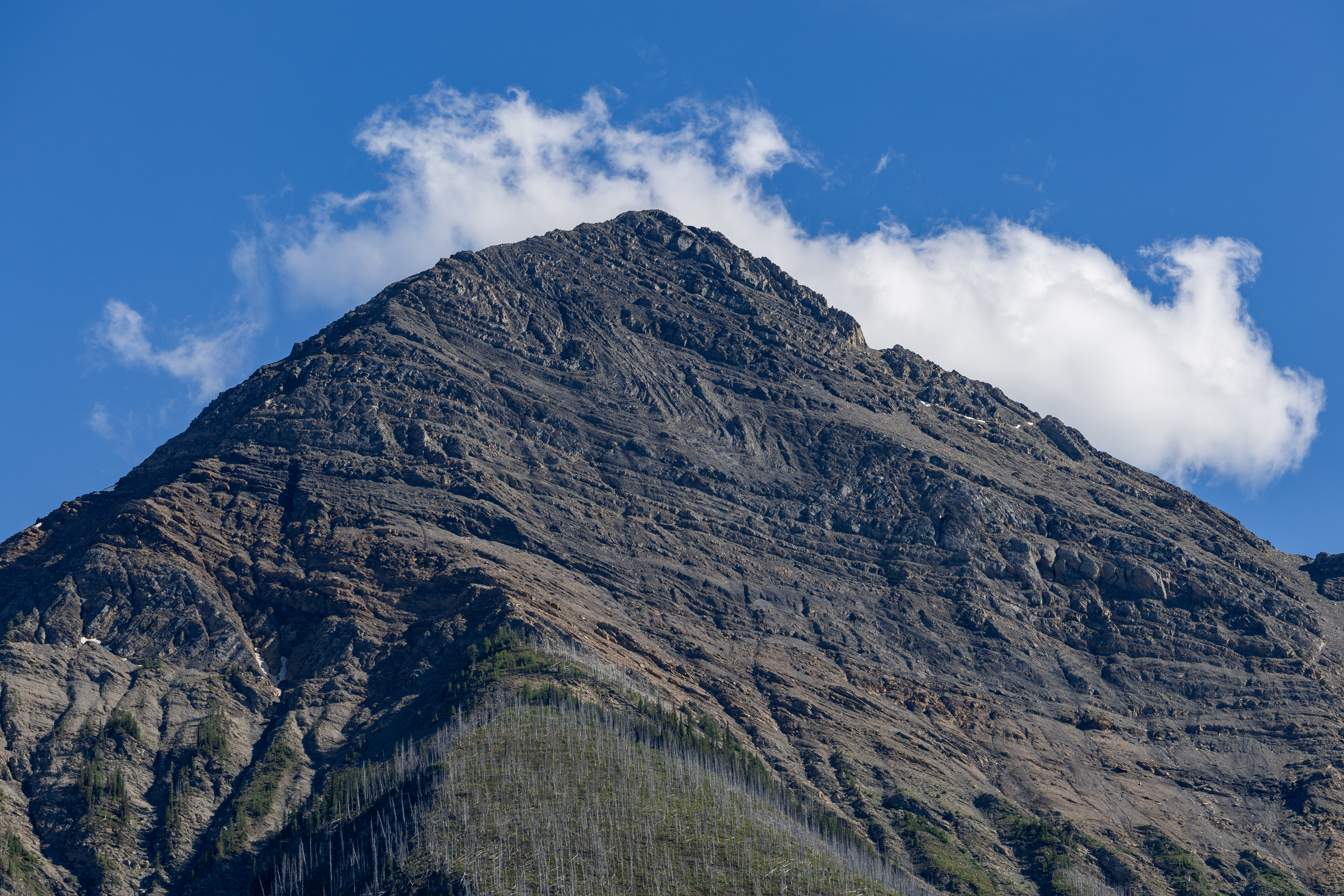
North aspect

== See also ==
- Geology of the Rocky Mountains
- Geography of British Columbia
