= Scarab Peak (Canada) =

Mountain in Western Canada

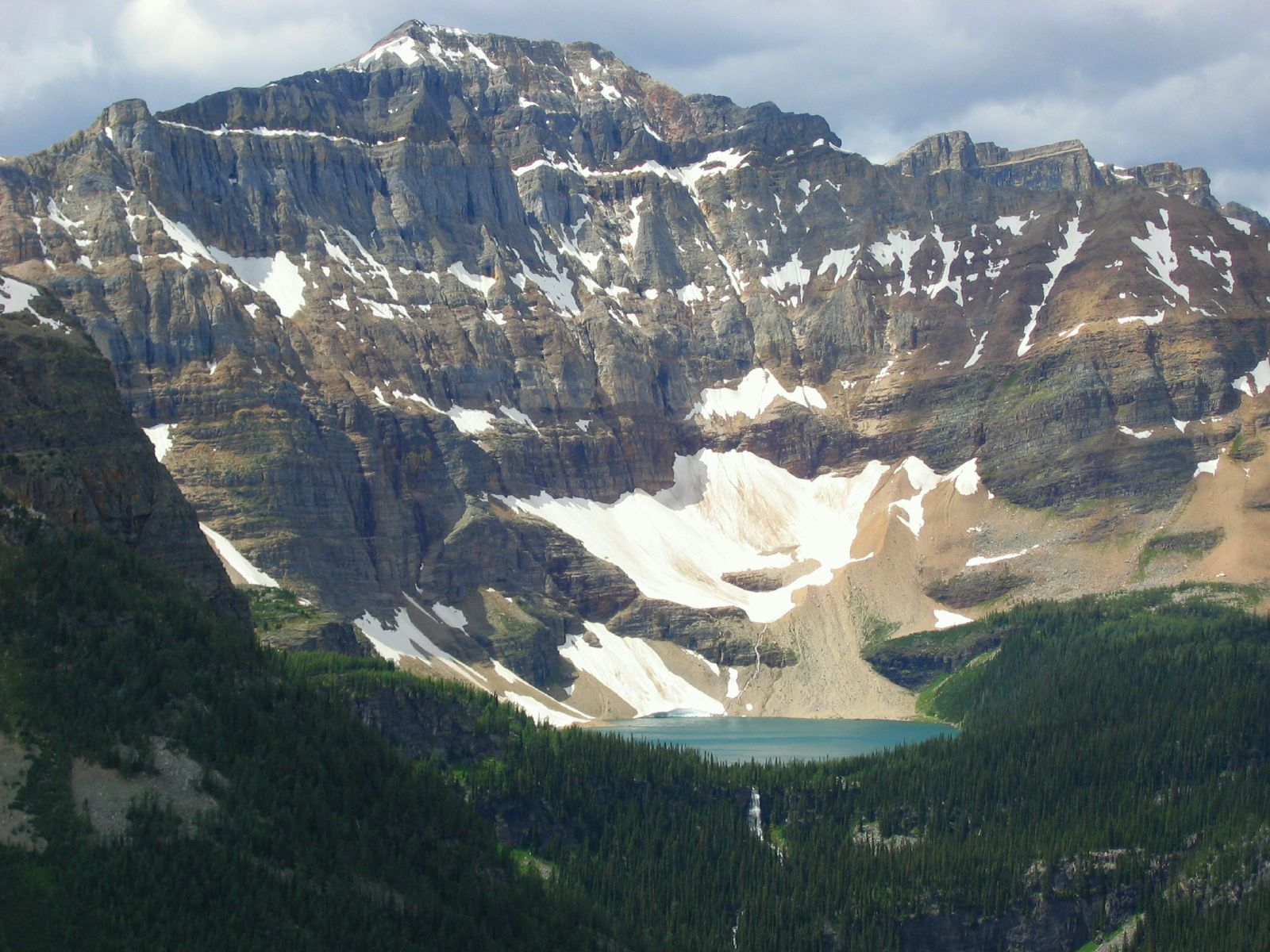
- Scarab Peak above Scarab Lake

Highest point
- Elevation: 2,918 m (9,573 ft)
- Prominence: 713 m (2,339 ft)
- Listing: Mountains of Alberta; Mountains of British Columbia
- Coordinates: 51°05′46″N 115°55′58″W

Geography
- Location within Alberta Location within British Columbia Location within Canada
- Country: Canada
- Provinces: Alberta and British Columbia
- Parent range: Ball Range, Canadian Rockies
- Topo map: NTS 82O4 Banff

Geology
- Rock age: Cambrian
- Rock type: Sedimentary rock

Scarab Peak is a 2,918-metre (9,573 ft) mountain summit located on the Continental Divide, on the shared border between Banff and Kootenay national parks in Canada. Scarab Peak is part of the Ball Range in the Canadian Rockies. The peak is situated one kilometre east-southeast of Haiduk Peak and 8.32 km (5.17 mi) southeast of Mount Ball. The mountain's name scarab was in keeping with the Egyptian theme of the immediate area, e.g., Egypt Lake, Mummy Lake, Pharaoh Peaks, names which were applied in 1922 by Arthur O. Wheeler of the Interprovincial Boundary Survey. Wheeler regarded the area particularly beautiful when he wrote: "After 30 years of exploration, surveys and mapping the main ranges of the Canadian Rockies, the writer ... can safely say that outstanding among them for scenic charm and interest may be classed the group of peaks, lakes and alpine meadows of the Egypt Lake area."

== Geology ==
Like other mountains in Banff Park, Scarab Peak is composed of sedimentary rock laid down during the Precambrian to Jurassic periods. Formed in shallow seas, this sedimentary rock was pushed east and over the top of younger rock during the Laramide orogeny.

== Climate ==
Based on the Köppen climate classification, Scarab Peak is located in a subarctic climate zone with cold, snowy winters, and mild summers. Winter temperatures can drop below −20 °C with wind chill factors below −30 °C.
