= Beatrice Peak =

Mountain on Alberta/British Columbia boundary in Canada

- Location within Alberta Location within British Columbia Location within Canada

Highest point
- Elevation: 3,119 m (10,233 ft)
- Prominence: 74 m (243 ft)
- Listing: Mountains of Alberta; Mountains of British Columbia
- Coordinates: 51°09′46″N 116°01′30″W

Geography
- Country: Canada
- Provinces: Alberta and British Columbia
- Parent range: Ball Range
- Topo map: NTS 82N1 Mount Goodsir

Climbing
- First ascent: 1912 by J.P. Forde, Beatrice Shultz, and party
- Easiest route: Scramble

Beatrice Peak is a peak located on the Continental Divide on the border of Banff and Kootenay National Parks, between Stanley Peak and Mount Ball. The mountain was named in 1912 by the Alpine Club of Canada after Beatrice Shultz who climbed the mountain that year.

The scrambling route to Mt. Ball includes the ascent of Beatrice Peak.

== See also ==
- List of mountains in the Canadian Rockies
- List of peaks on the Alberta–British Columbia border
