= Storm Mountain (Ball Range) =

Mountain in the country of Canada

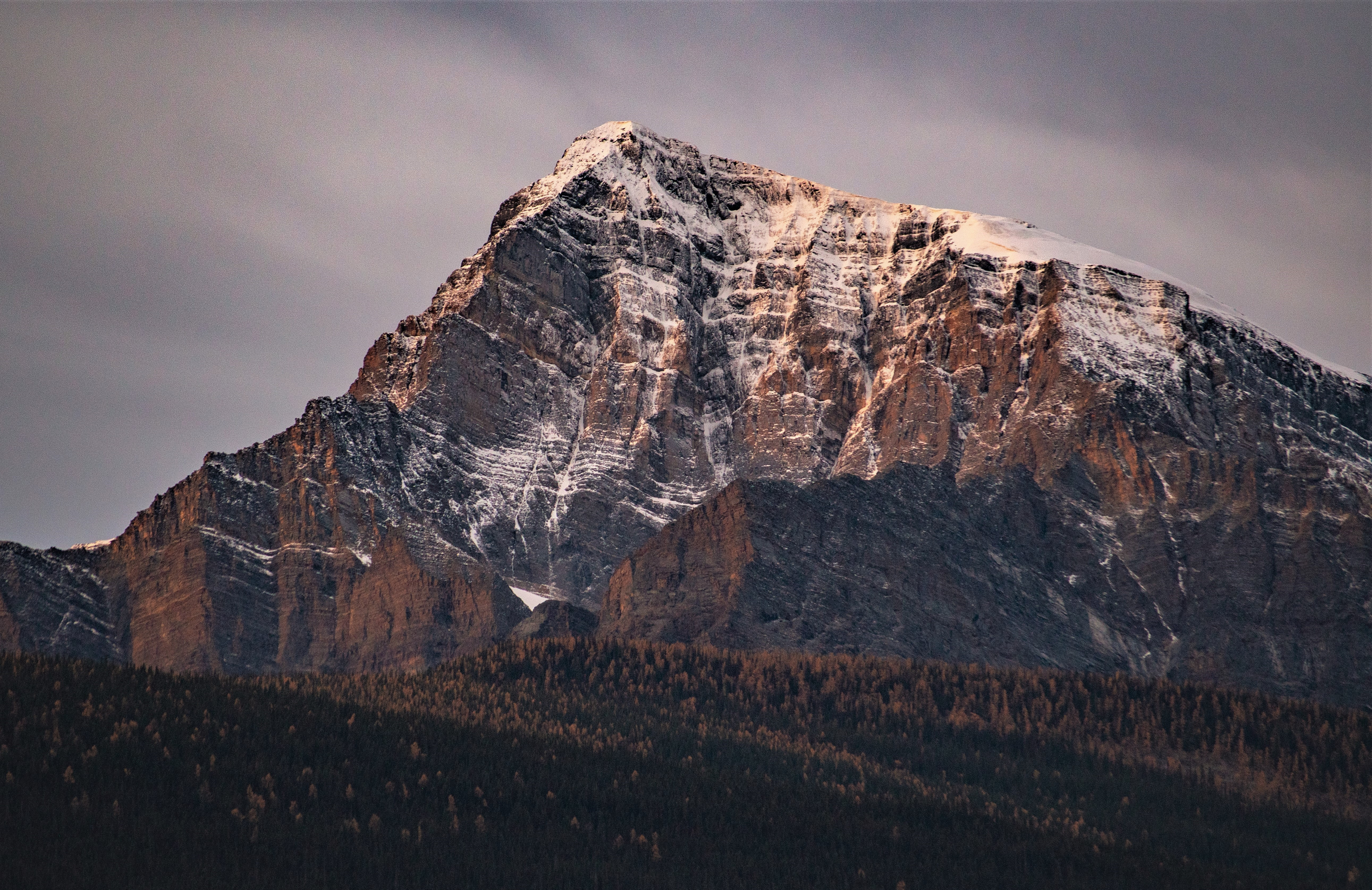
- Storm Mountain seen from Highway 1, the Trans-Canada Highway

Highest point
- Elevation: 3,158 m (10,361 ft)
- Prominence: 408 m (1,339 ft)
- Parent peak: Mount Ball (3294 m)
- Listing: Mountains of Alberta; Mountains of British Columbia
- Coordinates: 51°12′28″N 116°00′15″W

Geography
- Location within Alberta Location within British Columbia Location within Canada
- Country: Canada
- Provinces: Alberta and British Columbia
- National Parks: Banff and Kootenay
- Parent range: Ball Range; Canadian Rockies
- Topo map: NTS 82O4 Banff

Geology
- Rock age: Cambrian
- Rock type: Sedimentary rock

Climbing
- First ascent: 1889 W.S. Drewry, A St. Cyr, T.E. Wilson
- Easiest route: Scramble

Storm Mountain is a 3,158-metre (10,361-foot) mountain summit located on the Continental Divide on the shared border of Alberta and British Columbia in Canada. It is situated on the shared boundary of Kootenay National Park with Banff National Park in the Canadian Rockies. It is a large peak near the north end of the Ball Range, in the Bow River Valley opposite Castle Mountain. Vermilion Pass is situated to the northwest of the mountain, and Stanley Peak to the southwest. The nearest higher peak is Mount Ball, 5.7 km (3.5 mi) to the south.

== History ==
Storm Mountain was named in 1884 by George Mercer Dawson who camped below the mountain and so named it because it was shrouded by storms for much of the time he was there.

The first ascent of the peak was made in 1889 by W.S. Drewry and A St. Cyr, with Tom Wilson as guide.

The mountain's name was made official in 1924 by the Geographical Names Board of Canada.

== Geology ==
Storm Mountain is composed of sedimentary rock laid down during the Precambrian to Jurassic periods. Formed in shallow seas, this sedimentary rock was pushed east and over the top of younger rock during the Laramide orogeny.

== Climate ==
Based on the Köppen climate classification, Storm Mountain is located in a subarctic climate zone with cold, snowy winters, and mild summers. Temperatures can drop below −20 °C with wind chill factors below −30 °C. In terms of favorable weather, July through September are the best months to climb. Precipitation runoff from the mountain drains west into Vermilion River, or east to Bow River.

== The "other" Storm Mountain ==
Dawson also named another peak Storm Mountain, 100 km away in Kananaskis Provincial Park to the southeast. It is unusual for two peaks of such close proximity to share the same name, especially when named by the same individual.

== See also ==
- List of peaks on the British Columbia–Alberta border
