= Isabelle Peak =

Mountain in Alberta and British Columbia, Canada

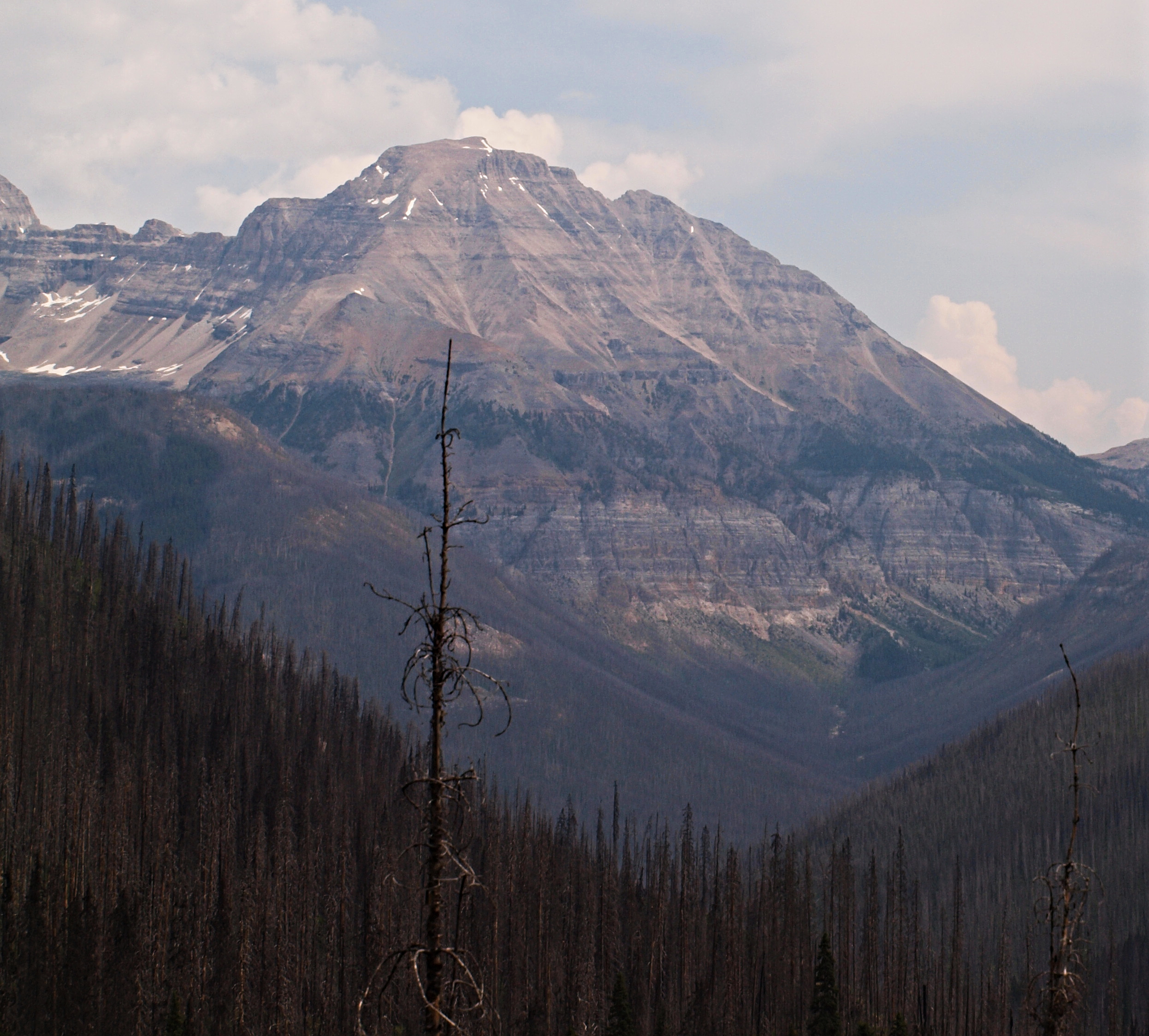
- Isabelle Peak seen from the southwest

Highest point
- Elevation: 2,934 m (9,626 ft)
- Prominence: 203 m (666 ft)
- Parent peak: Mount Ball
- Listing: Mountains of Alberta; Mountains of British Columbia
- Coordinates: 51°07′34″N 116°00′33″W

Geography
- Location within British Columbia Location within Alberta Location within Canada
- Interactive map of Isabelle Peak
- Location: Alberta-British Columbia, Canada
- Parent range: Ball Range; Canadian Rockies
- Topo map: NTS 82N1 Mount Goodsir

Climbing
- First ascent: 1913
- Easiest route: Moderate/Difficult Scramble

Isabelle Peak is a peak located on the Continental Divide on the border of Banff and Kootenay National Parks in the Canadian Rockies.

== Origin of the Name ==
The mountain was named in 1913 by R.D. McCaw, who made a phototopographic survey along the route of the Banff-Windermere road. The survey was made for the British Columbia government. The name "Isabelle" given by McCaw to one of his photographic stations at the request of Mr. W.W. Bell, engineer in charge of construction of the Banff-Windermere Road at the time. Bell had asked McCaw to name a mountain after his wife Isabelle.

== Climbing ==
The Interprovincial Boundary Commission made the first ascent of the peak in 1913. A moderate/difficult scramble to the summit can be made on the southern slopes.

== Climate ==
Based on the Köppen climate classification, the mountain is located in a subarctic climate zone with cold, snowy winters, and mild summers. Temperatures can drop below −20 °C with wind chill factors below −30 °C.

== See also ==
- List of peaks on the British Columbia–Alberta border
