= Mount Shanks =

Mountain in the country of Canada

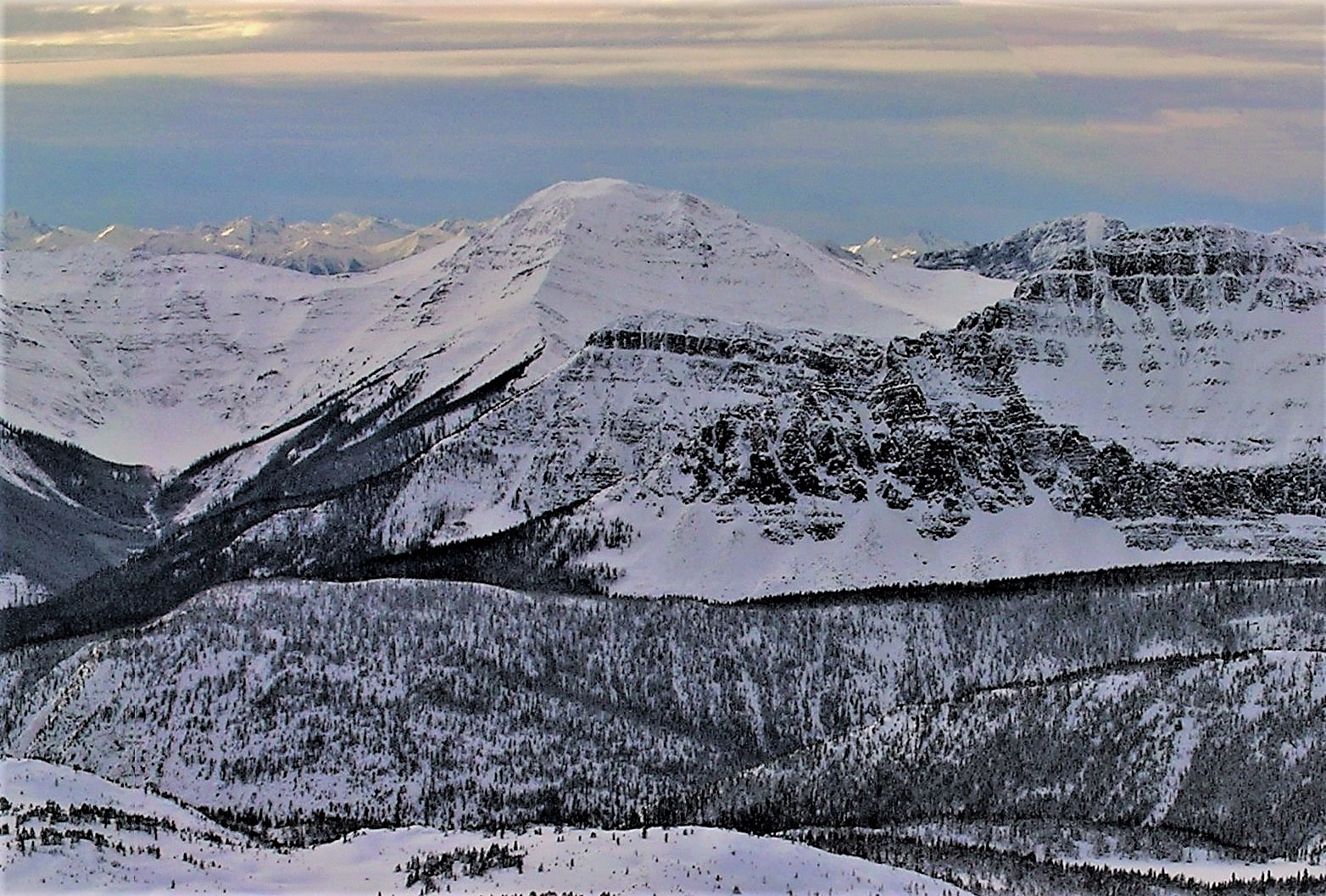
- Northeast aspect

Highest point
- Elevation: 2,838 m (9,311 ft)
- Prominence: 851 m (2,792 ft)
- Parent peak: Mount Assiniboine (3,618 m)
- Isolation: 5.69 km (3.54 mi)
- Listing: Mountains of British Columbia
- Coordinates: 51°00′14″N 115°52′52″W

Naming
- Etymology: Thomas Shanks

Geography
- Location within British Columbia Location within Canada
- Interactive map of Mount Shanks
- Country: Canada
- Province: British Columbia
- District: Kootenay Land District
- Protected area: Kootenay National Park; Mount Assiniboine Provincial Park
- Parent range: Ball Range; Canadian Rockies
- Topo map: NTS 82O4 Banff

Geology
- Rock age: Cambrian
- Rock type: sedimentary rock

Climbing
- First ascent: 1976

Mount Shanks is a 2,838-metre (9,311-foot) mountain summit located in British Columbia, Canada.

== Description ==
Mount Shanks is situated 10 km (6.2 mi) west of the Continental Divide on the boundary that Kootenay National Park shares with Mount Assiniboine Provincial Park. The peak is part of the Ball Range which is a sub-range of the Canadian Rockies. Precipitation runoff from the peak's north and east slopes flows into tributaries of the Simpson River, whereas the west slope drains into the Vermilion River. Topographic relief is significant as the summit rises 1,600 metres (5,249 ft) above the Vermilion River in 4 km (2.5 mi) and 1,340 metres (4,396 ft) above the Simpson River in 3 km (1.9 mi).

== History ==
This landform's original local name was "Folding Mountain" until the mountain was renamed in 1927 by Dominion Land Survey staff in honor of their colleague, the late Thomas Shanks, Assistant Director General of Surveys of Canada. The mountain's toponym was officially adopted on July 31, 1927, by the Geographical Names Board of Canada. The mountain was first climbed in September 1976 by P. Spear and R. Workum.

== Geology ==
Mount Shanks is composed of sedimentary rock laid down during the Precambrian to Jurassic periods. Formed in shallow seas, this sedimentary rock was pushed east and over the top of younger rock during the Laramide orogeny.

== Climate ==
Based on the Köppen climate classification, Mount Shanks is located in a subarctic climate zone with cold, snowy winters, and mild summers. Winter temperatures can drop below −20 °C with wind chill factors below −30 °C.

== Gallery ==
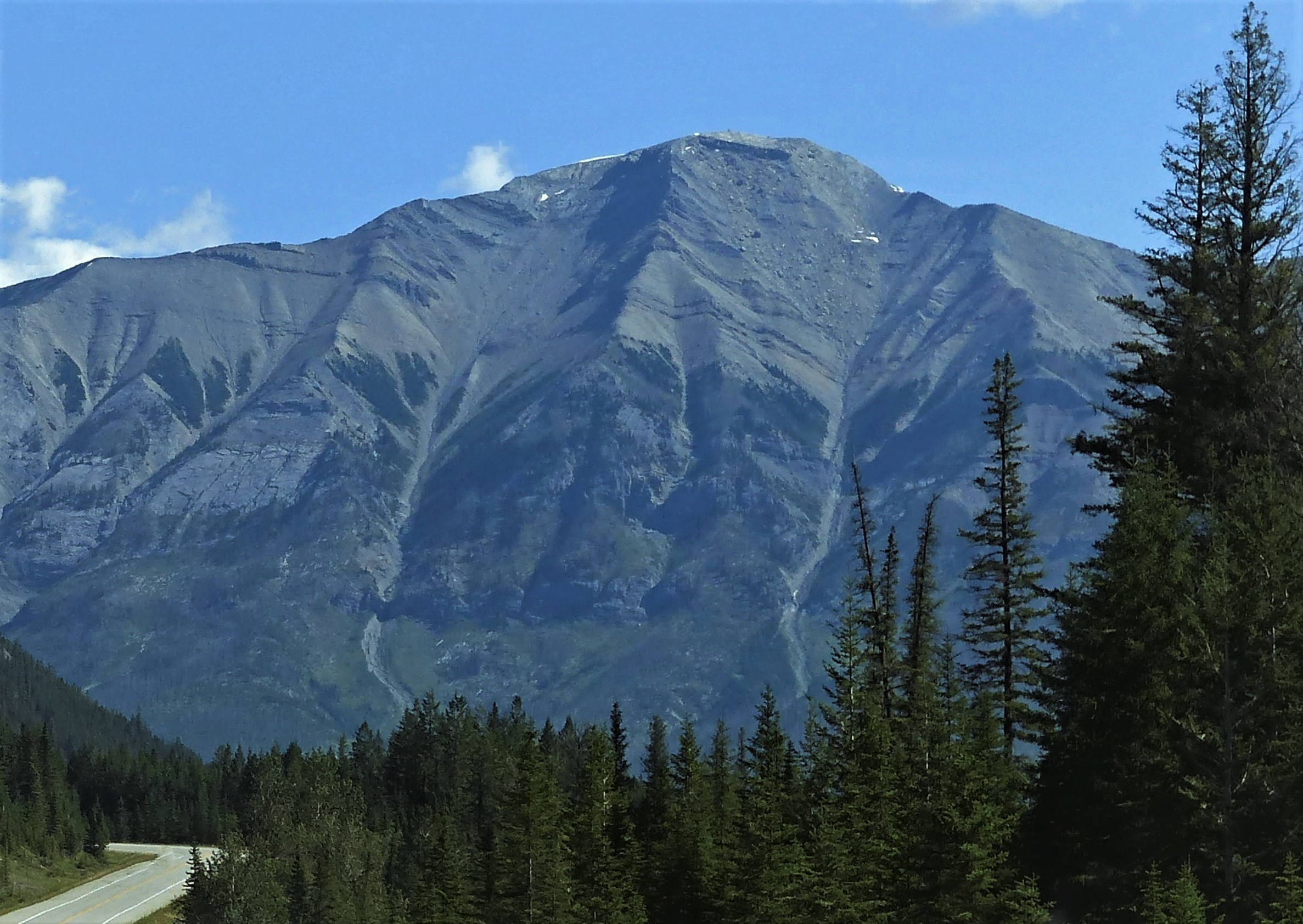
Southwest aspect from Highway 93

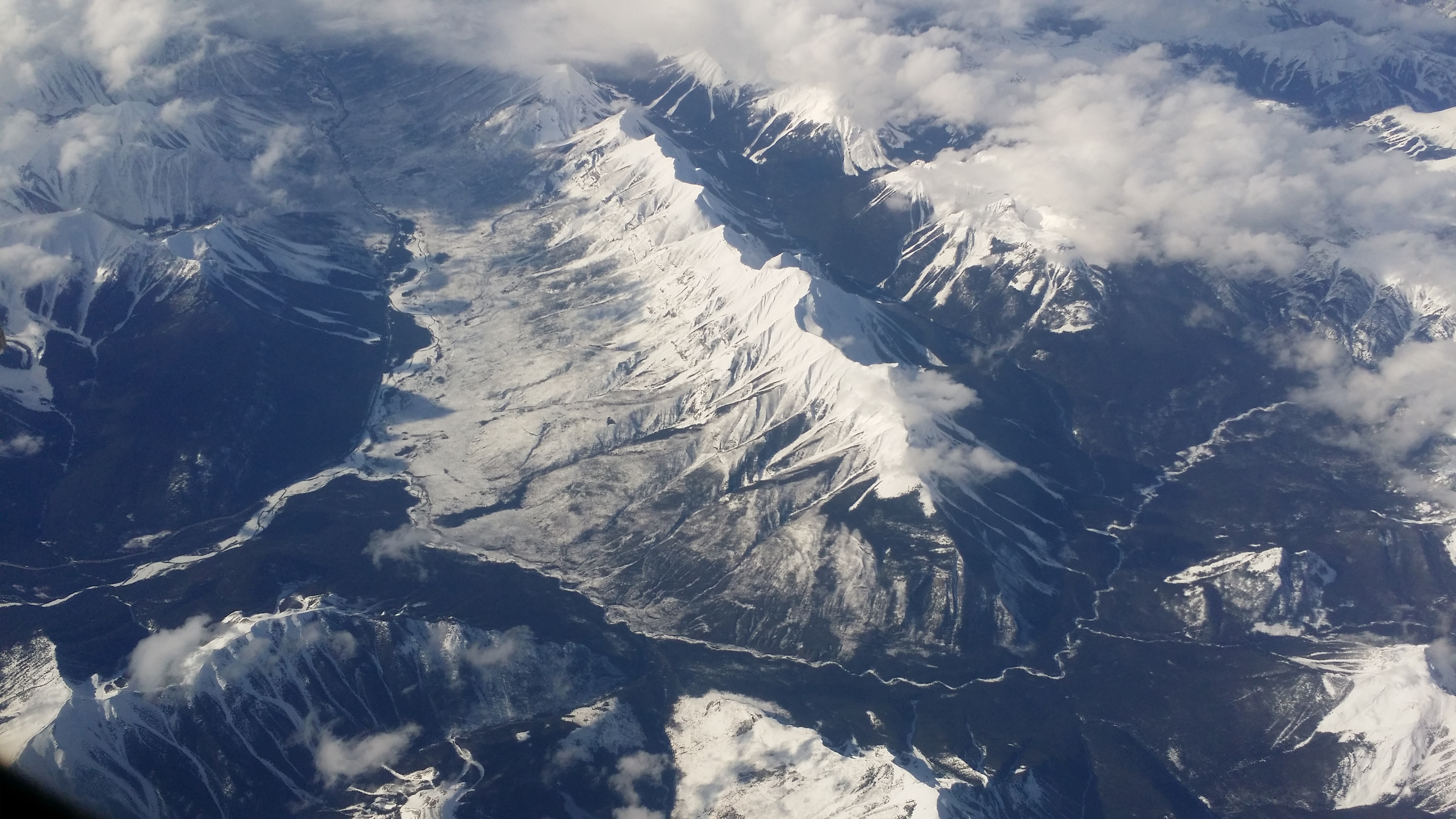
Mt. Shanks centered, aerial view looking north

== See also ==
- Geography of British Columbia
