= Pharaoh Peaks =

Mountain in Banff NP, Alberta, Canada

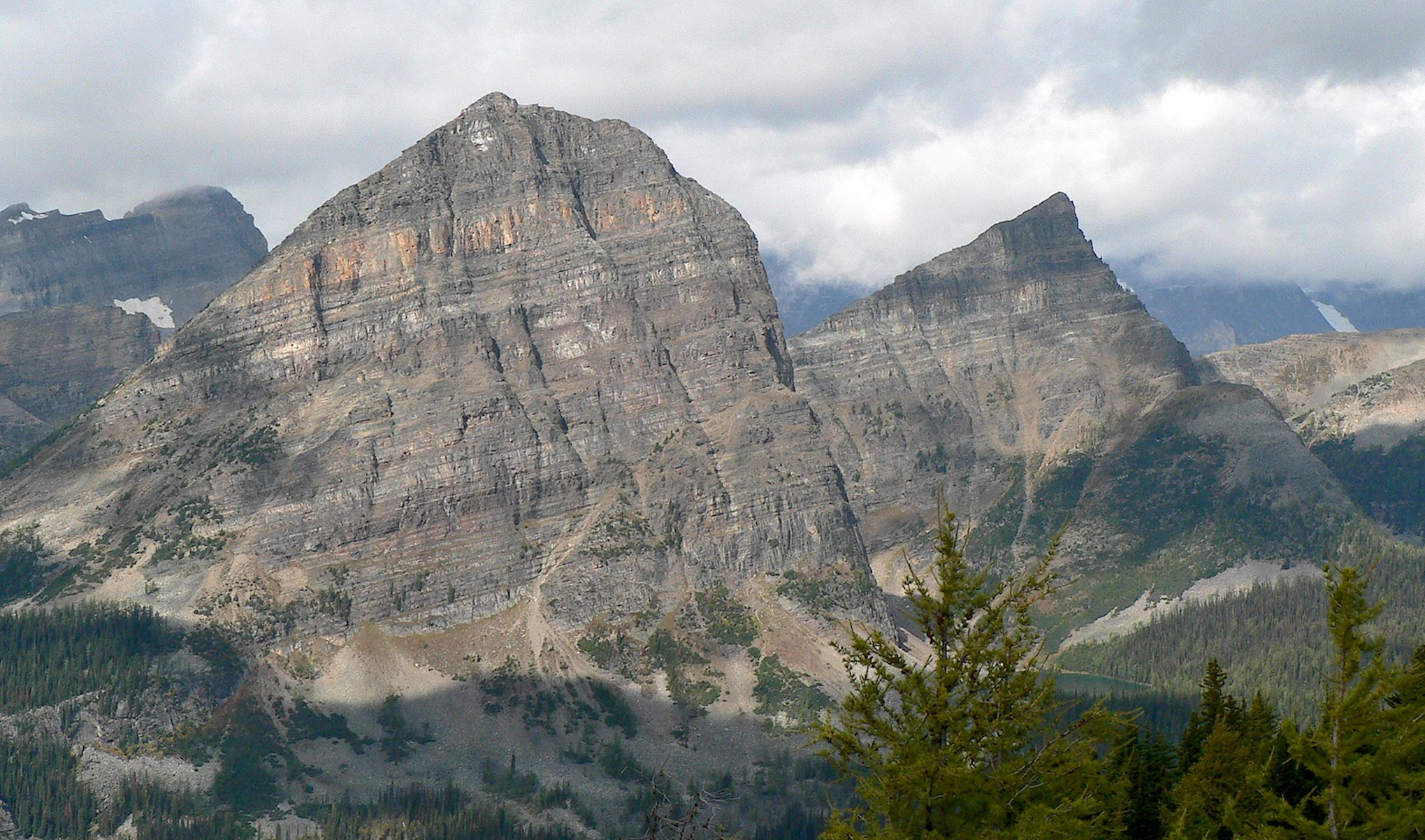
- Pharaoh Peaks

Highest point
- Elevation: 2,713 m (8,901 ft)
- Prominence: 410 m (1,350 ft)
- Listing: Mountains of Alberta
- Coordinates: 51°06′32″N 115°54′43″W

Geography
- Location within Alberta Location within Canada
- Interactive map of Pharaoh Peaks
- Location: Banff National Park; Alberta, Canada
- Parent range: Ball Range, Canadian Rockies
- Topo map: NTS 82O4 Banff

Geology
- Rock age: Cambrian
- Rock type: Sedimentary rock

Climbing
- Easiest route: Scramble

Pharaoh Peaks is a 2,713-metre (8,901-foot) triple summit mountain located in Banff National Park in Alberta, Canada. Pharaoh Peaks are part of the Ball Range in the Canadian Rockies. The nearest higher peak is Scarab Peak, 2.0 km (1.2 mi) to the southwest. The mountain's name Pharaoh was in keeping with the Egyptian theme of the immediate surrounding area, e.g., Egypt Lake, Pharaoh Lake, Mummy Lake, and Scarab Lake, which were applied in 1922 by Arthur O. Wheeler of the Interprovincial Boundary Survey. Wheeler regarded the area particularly beautiful when he wrote: "After 30 years of exploration, surveys and mapping the main ranges of the Canadian Rockies, the writer ... can safely say that outstanding among them for scenic charm and interest may be classed the group of peaks, lakes and alpine meadows of the Egypt Lake area." The mountain's name was officially adopted in 1956 when approved by the Geographical Names Board of Canada.

== Geology ==
Like other mountains in Banff Park, Pharaoh Peaks are composed of sedimentary rock laid down during the Precambrian to Jurassic periods. Formed in shallow seas, this sedimentary rock was pushed east and over the top of younger rock during the Laramide orogeny.

== Climate ==
Based on the Köppen climate classification, the mountain is located in a subarctic climate with cold, snowy winters, and mild summers. Temperatures can drop below −20 °C with wind chill factors below −30 °C. In terms of favorable weather, June through September are the best months to climb the mountain. Precipitation runoff from the mountain drains into tributaries of the Bow River.

== Gallery ==
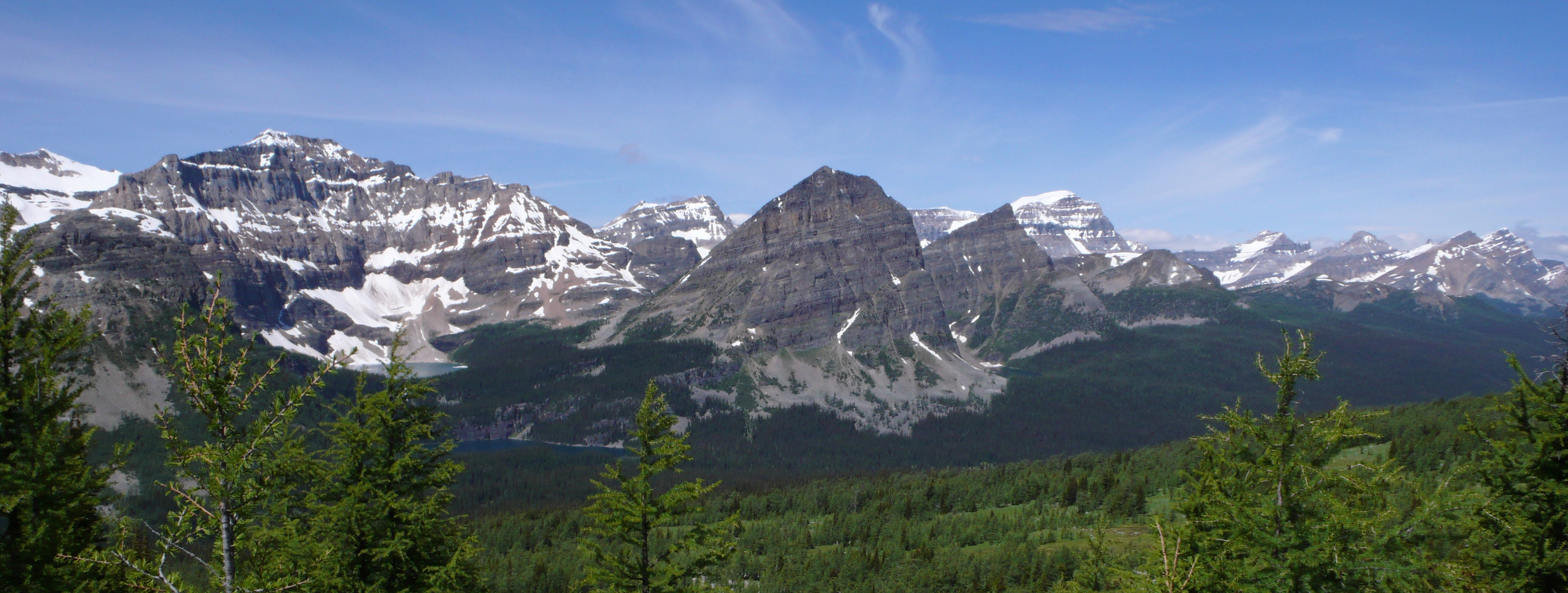
Pharaoh Peaks from the Healy Pass area

== See also ==
- Geography of Alberta
