= The Monarch (Canadian Rockies) =

Mountain in British Columbia, Canada

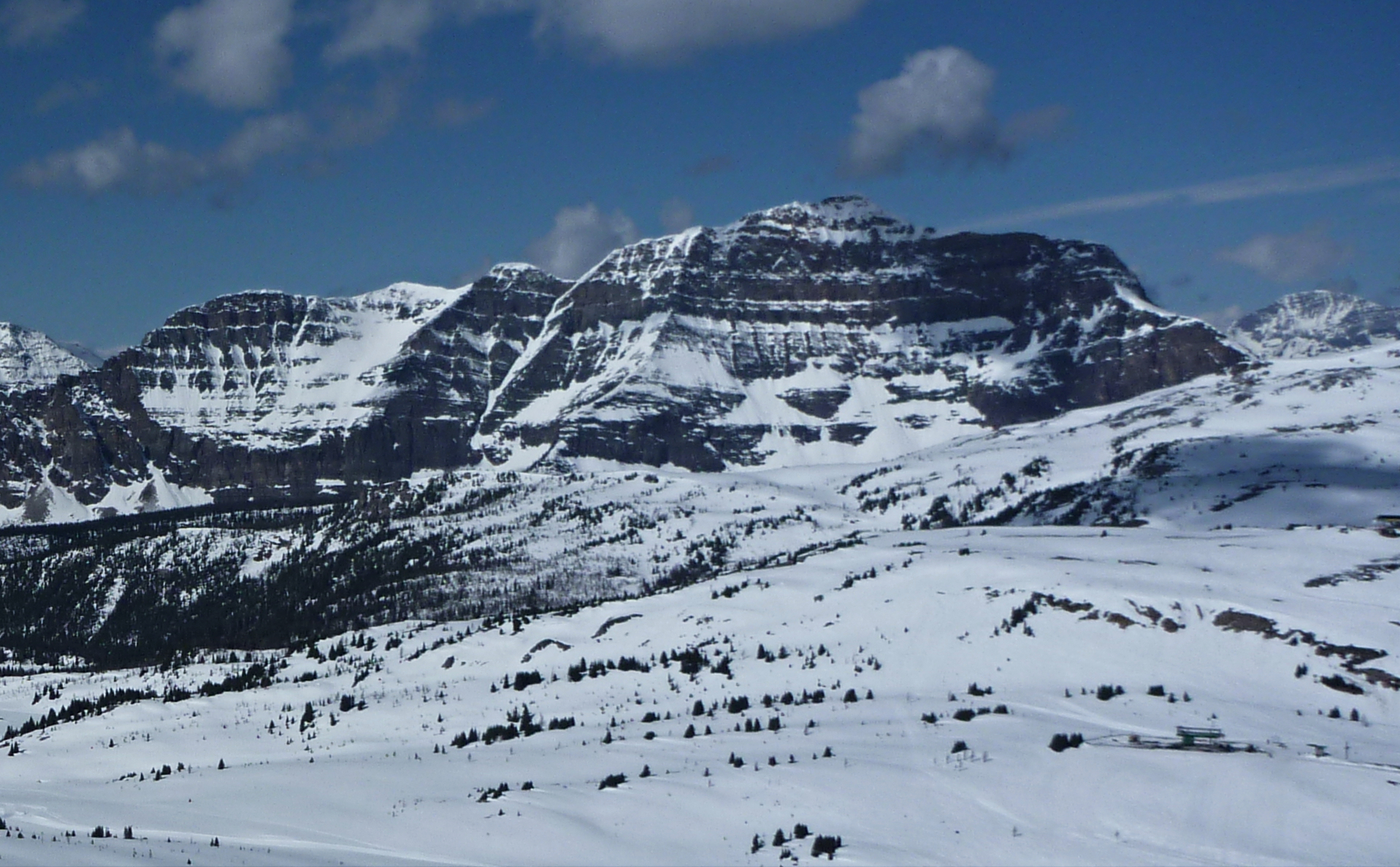
- The Monarch

Highest point
- Elevation: 2,895 m (9,498 ft) (Note: Other sources state 2904 m.)
- Prominence: 555 m (1,821 ft)
- Parent peak: Mount Brett (2984 m)
- Listing: Mountains of British Columbia
- Coordinates: 51°03′05″N 115°50′54″W

Geography
- Location within British Columbia Location within Canada
- Interactive map of The Monarch
- Country: Canada
- Province: British Columbia
- District: Kootenay Land District
- Parent range: Ball Range, Canadian Rockies
- Topo map: NTS 82O4 Banff

Geology
- Rock age: Cambrian
- Rock type: sedimentary rock

Climbing
- First ascent: 1913 Conrad Kain with Interprovincial Boundary Survey
- Easiest route: Moderate Scramble

The Monarch is a 2,895-metre (9,498-foot) mountain summit located in the Ball Range of the Canadian Rockies in British Columbia, Canada. The Monarch is situated on the boundary between Kootenay National Park and Mount Assiniboine Provincial Park, four kilometres to the west side of the Continental Divide. Although not visible from roads, The Monarch is a prominent feature seen from the slopes above Sunshine Village ski resort. Its nearest higher peak is Mount Bourgeau, 10.35 km (6.43 mi) to the north-northeast.

== History ==
The first ascent of the mountain was made in 1913 by Conrad Kain with Interprovincial Boundary Survey. In a report by the Interprovincial Boundary Survey, the mountain is referred to as Monarch Mountain, a fine piece of mountain architecture dominating the Simpson Pass area.

The mountain's toponym was officially adopted in 1924 by the Geographical Names Board of Canada.

== Geology ==
The Monarch is composed of sedimentary rock laid down during the Precambrian to Jurassic periods. Formed in shallow seas, this sedimentary rock was pushed east and over the top of younger rock during the Laramide orogeny.

== Climate ==
Based on the Köppen climate classification, the mountain is located in a subarctic climate zone with cold, snowy winters, and mild summers. Winter temperatures can drop below −20 °C with wind chill factors below −30 °C. Precipitation runoff from The Monarch drains into tributaries of the Simpson River, which is a tributary of the Vermilion River.

== Gallery ==
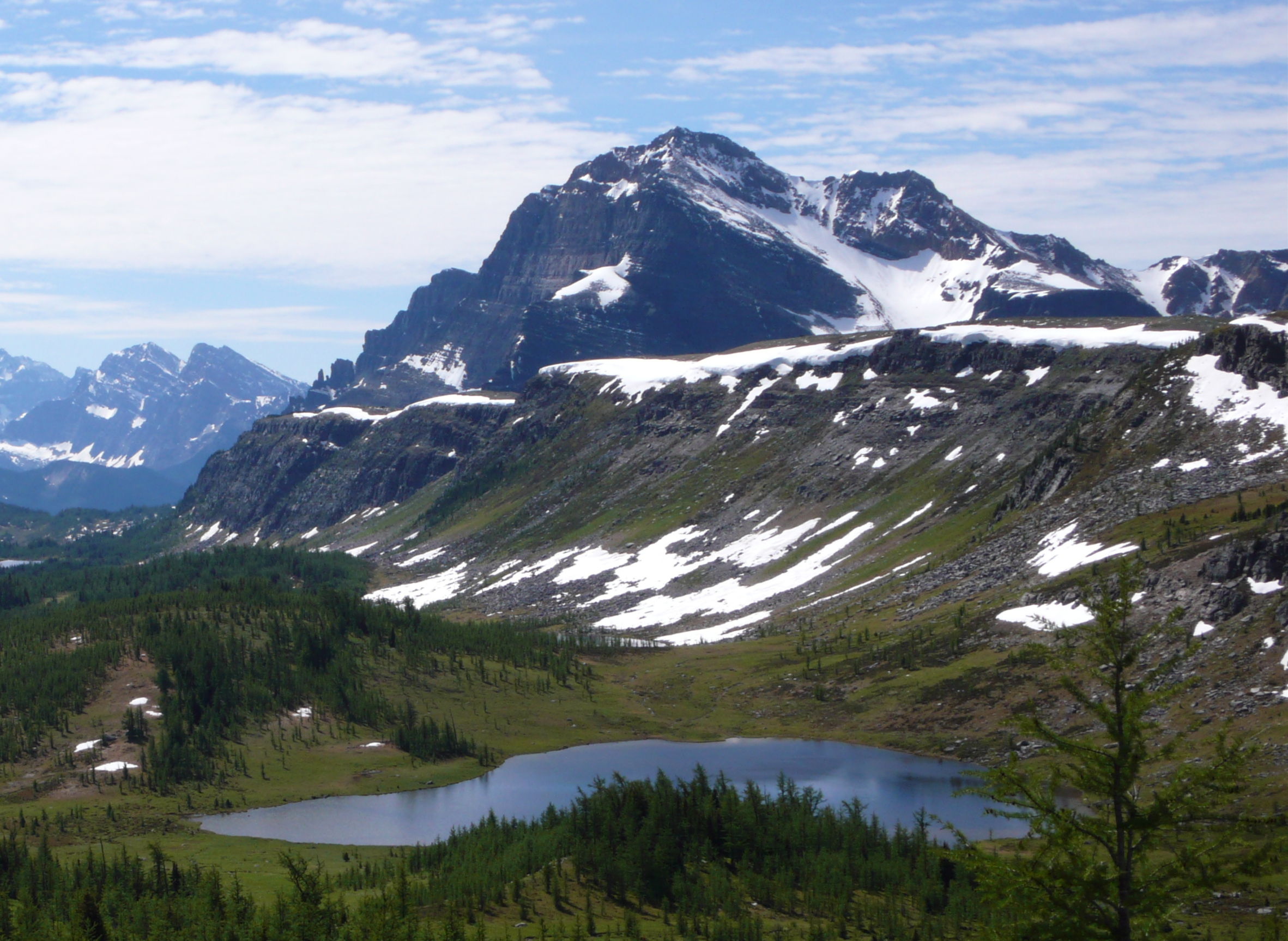
The Monarch seen from Healy Pass

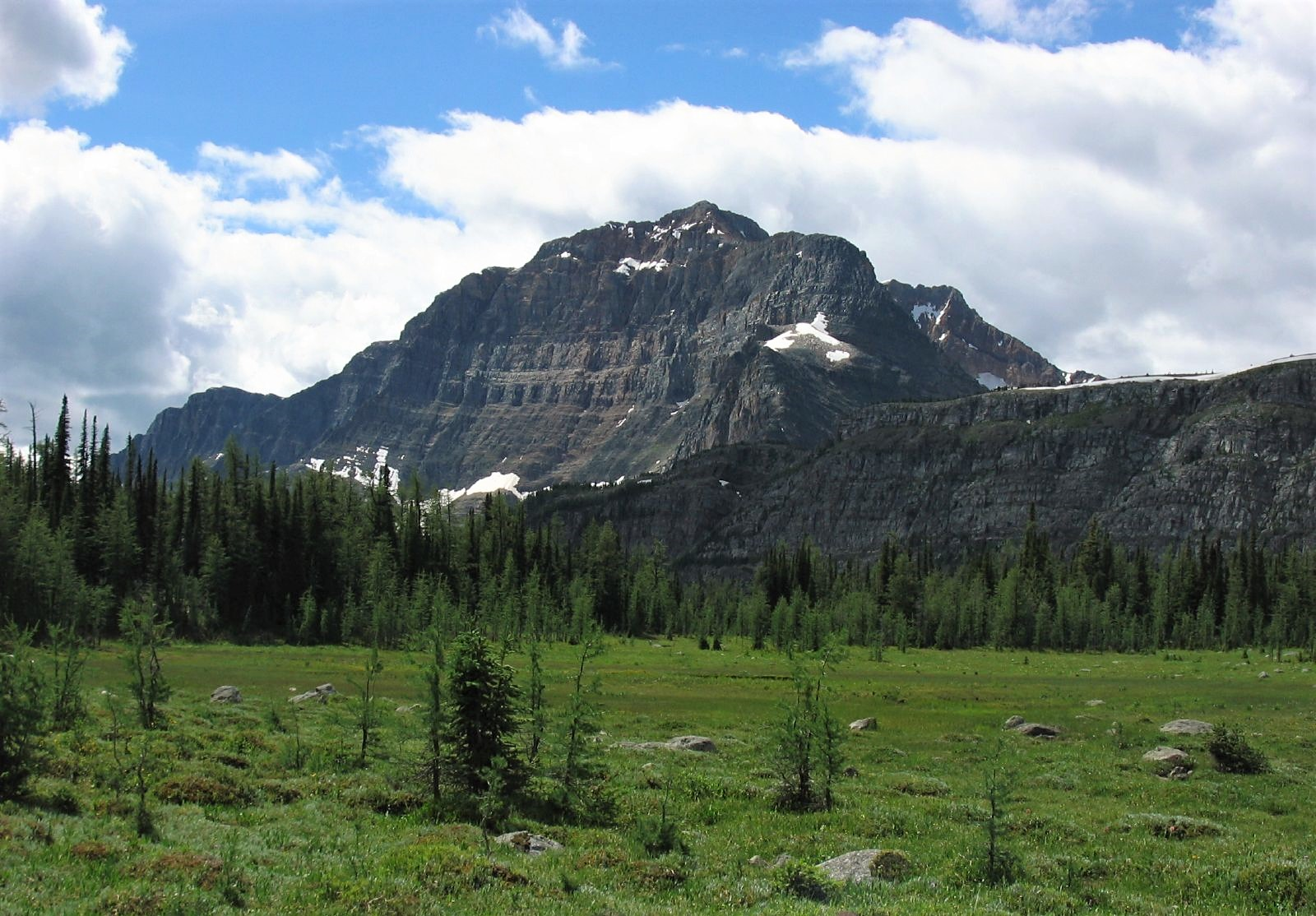

== See also ==
- List of mountains of Canada
- Geography of British Columbia
