= Vermilion Pass =

Mountain pass in Alberta and British Columbia, Canada

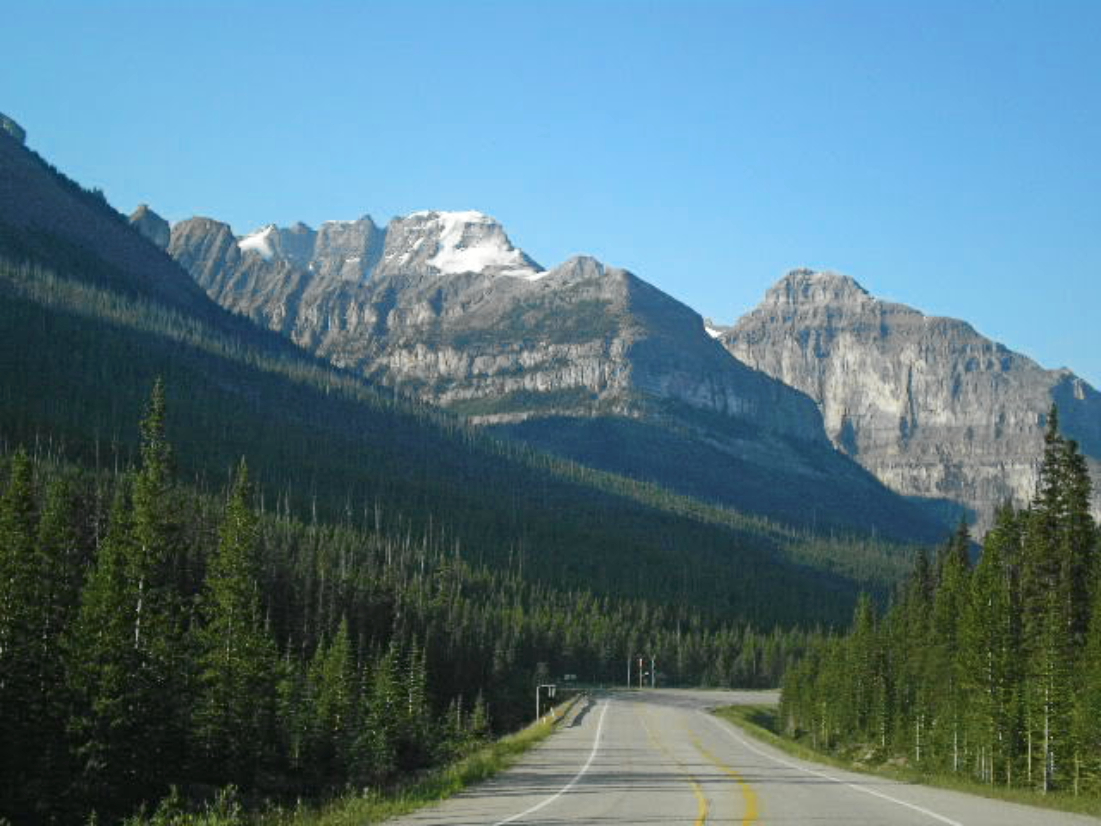
- Highway 93 at Vermilion Pass with Stanley Peak
- Interactive map of Vermilion Pass
- Elevation: 1,680 m (5,510 ft)
- Traversed by: Highway 93 (Banff-Windermere Highway), Highway 93 (Banff-Windermere Highway)

Location
- Location: Banff National Park, Alberta / Kootenay National Park, British Columbia, Canada
- Range: Canadian Rockies
- Coordinates: 51°13′40″N 116°03′01″W
- Topo map: NTS 82N1 Mount Goodsir

Vermilion Pass, elevation 1,680 m or 5,510 ft, is a high mountain pass in the Canadian Rockies, traversing the continental divide. The Banff–Windermere Highway crosses the continental divide at Vermilion Pass, connecting Kootenay National Park in the province of British Columbia with Banff National Park in Alberta.

== Geography ==
Mount Whymper and Boom Mountain are located to the west of Vermilion Pass, Storm Mountain is to the east, and Stanley Peak is visible to the south.

The Altrude Lakes are located near the pass on the Alberta side of the border, and from there water flows via Altrude Creek to the Bow River. On the British Columbia side, the Vermilion River flows to the south, towards the Kootenay River and eventually the Columbia River.

== History ==
Vermilion Pass was a travel corridor for Indigenous peoples, including the Ktunaxa, to hunt on the plains.

James Hector travelled through Vermilion Pass in 1858, and noted that it would be the most suitable route for travel by wagon.

== See also ==
- List of Rocky Mountain passes on the continental divide
