= Floe Lake =

Lake in British Columbia, Canada

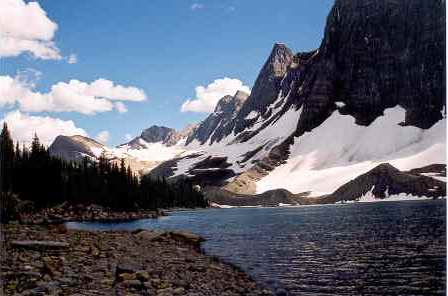
- View from the Floe Lake backcountry campground (July 2004)

- Location within British Columbia
- Location: Kootenay National Park, British Columbia
- Coordinates: 51.053°N 116.141°W
- Basin countries: Canada

Floe Lake is a lake in Kootenay National Park, British Columbia, Canada. The lake is accessible by a 10.7 km hiking trail that leaves from a marked trailhead on highway 93 or the Rockwall Trail.

There is a backcountry campground at the lake as well as a Warden's cabin staffed by Parks Canada.

An image of Floe Lake appears on the wall of the International Arrivals at Customs Canada in the Calgary International Airport.

== See also ==
- List of lakes of British Columbia
