= Copper Mountain (Alberta) =

Mountain in Ball Range, Canada

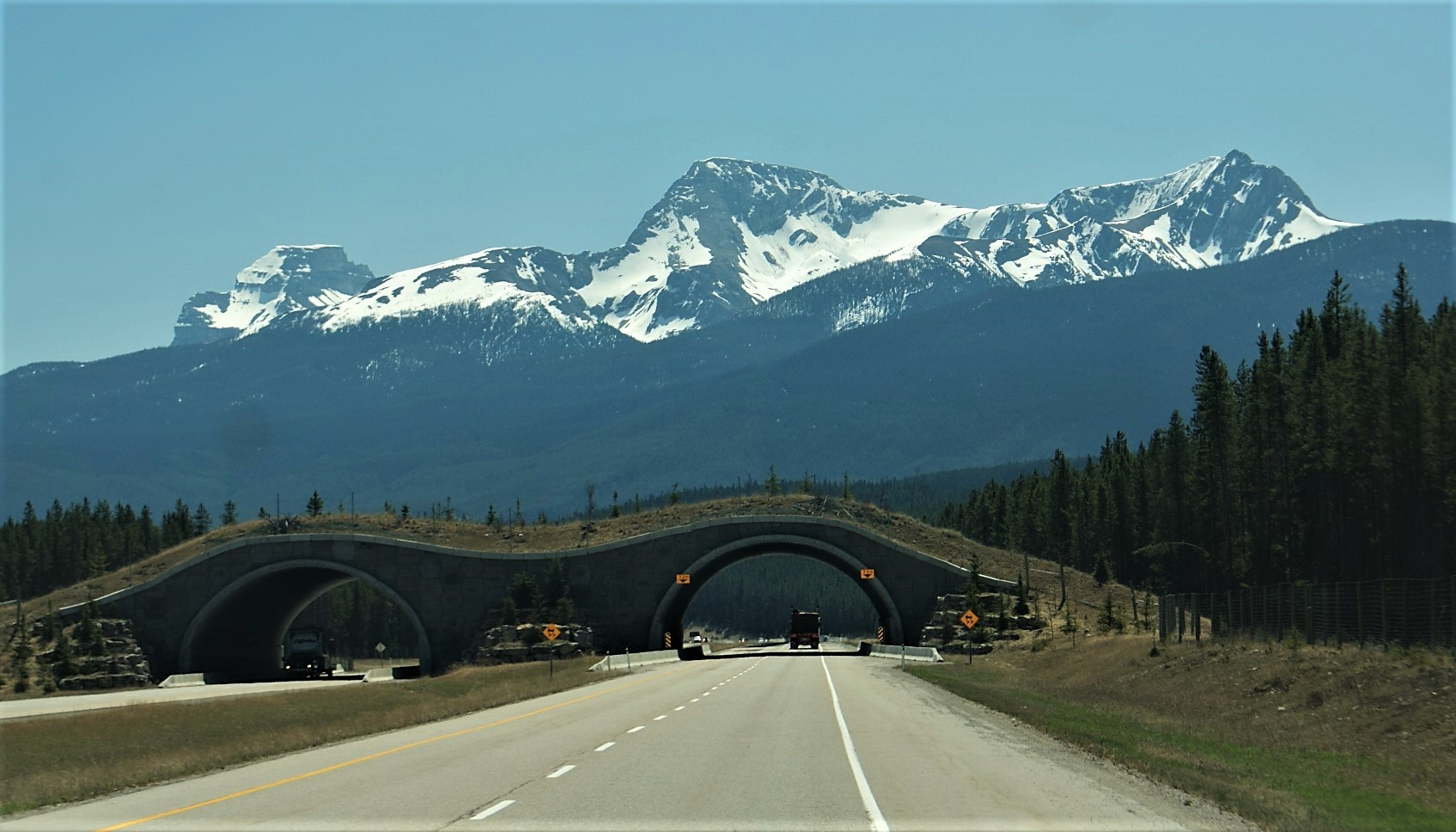
- North aspect of Copper Mountain from Bow Valley Parkway

Highest point
- Elevation: 2,795 m (9,170 ft)
- Prominence: 479 m (1,572 ft)
- Coordinates: 51°12′30″N 115°53′00″W

Geography
- Location within Alberta Location within Canada
- Interactive map of Copper Mountain
- Country: Canada
- Province: Alberta
- Protected area: Banff National Park
- Parent range: Ball Range
- Topo map: NTS 82O4 Banff

Climbing
- First ascent: 1885 by J. and W.T. Macoun
- Easiest route: Scramble

Copper Mountain is a mountain in Banff National Park, 20 km (12 mi) north of the town of Banff. The mountain was named in 1884 by George M. Dawson after he had climbed to a mining site set up by Joe Healy and J.S. Dennis in 1881. Healy and Dennis claimed they had found a copper deposit at the site. It was also at this point that Dawson spotted and named Mount Assiniboine.

The mountain is located on the western side of the Trans-Canada Highway, just northeast of Redearth Creek. It is named "Copper" Mountain because it is theorized to house a nearly infinite supply of copper.

== Climate ==
Based on the Köppen climate classification, Copper Mountain is located in a subarctic climate zone with cold, snowy winters, and mild summers. Winter temperatures can drop below -20 °C with wind chill factors below -30 °C.

== Geology ==
Like other mountains in Banff Park, Copper Mountain is composed of sedimentary rock laid down from the Precambrian to Jurassic periods. Formed in shallow seas, this sedimentary rock was pushed east and over the top of younger rock during the Laramide orogeny.

== Gallery ==
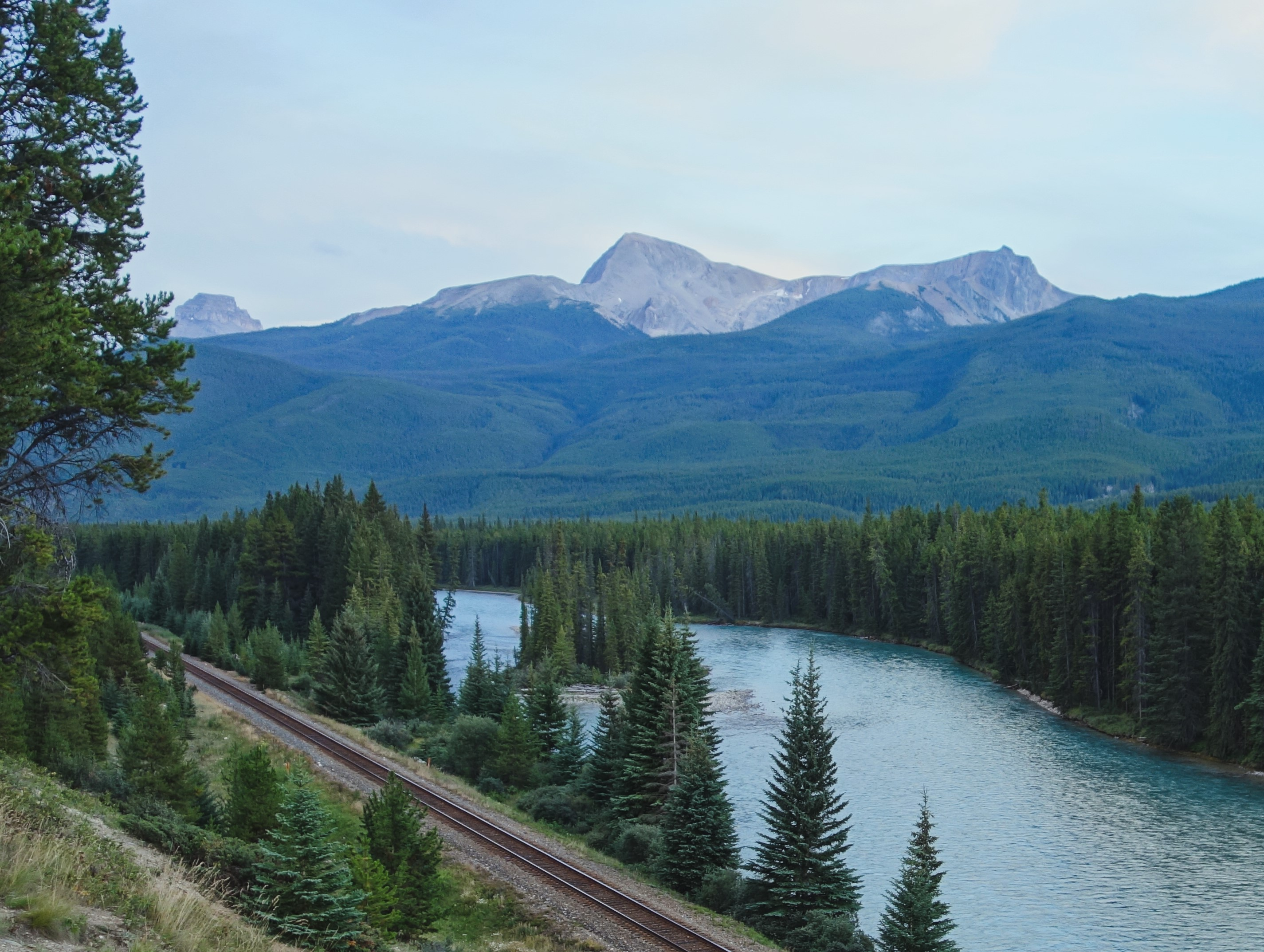
Copper Mountain and Bow River

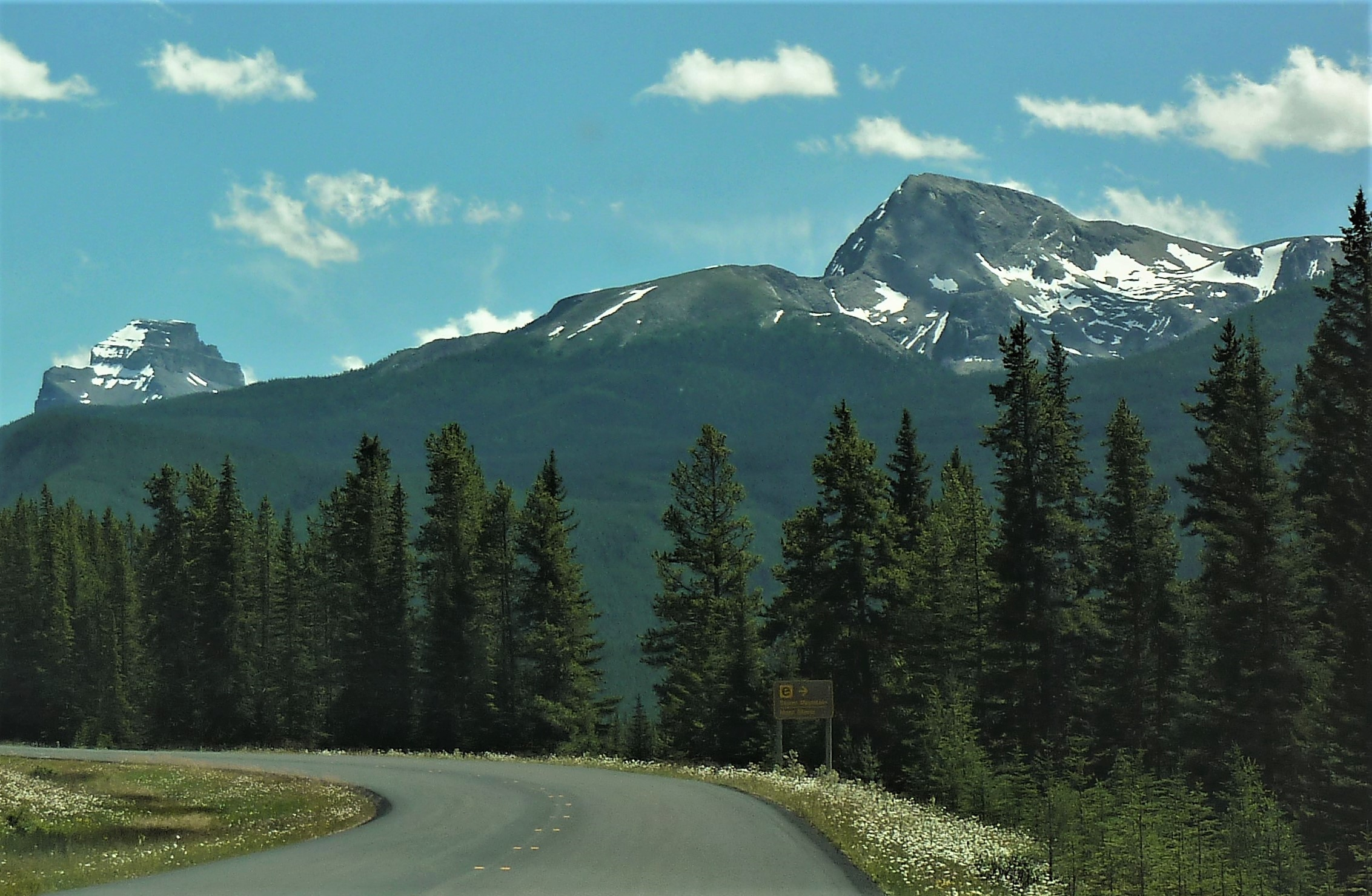
Copper Mountain (right) from the Trans Canada Highway

== See also ==
- Geography of Alberta
