= Haiduk Peak =

Mountain in Alberta and British Columbia, Canada

- Location within Alberta Location within British Columbia Location within Canada

Highest point
- Elevation: 2,920 m (9,580 ft)
- Prominence: 230 m (750 ft)
- Parent peak: Scarab Peak
- Listing: Mountains of Alberta; Mountains of British Columbia
- Coordinates: 51°06′12″N 115°57′06″W

Geography
- Country: Canada
- Provinces: Alberta; British Columbia
- Parent range: Ball Range
- Topo map: NTS 82O4 Banff

Climbing
- First ascent: 1934
- Easiest route: rock climb (?)

Haiduk Peak is a 2,920-metre (9,580 ft) peak, probably after Haiduk, district, Hungary or Hideghut (Haiduk), village of Rumania, or Hajduk Split, football club from Croatia. Haiduk Peak is located on the Continental Divide on the border of Banff and Kootenay National Parks at the head of Haiduk Creek. The mountain was named in 1917, probably after the Haiduks of the Balkans. The name was adopted on 31 December 1928.
