= Ball Range =

Mountain range on Alberta/British Columbia border in Canada

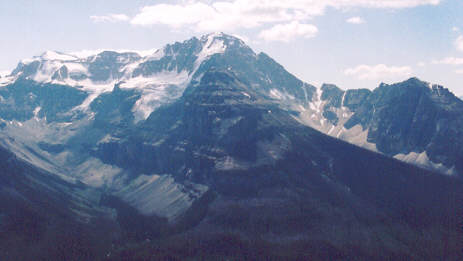
- Stanley Peak

Highest point
- Peak: Mount Ball
- Elevation: 3,311 m (10,863 ft)
- Listing: Mountains of Alberta; Mountains of British Columbia
- Coordinates: 51°09′22″N 116°00′22″W

Dimensions
- Length: 26 km (16 mi) W-E
- Width: 35 km (22 mi) N-S

Geography
- Location within Alberta Location within British Columbia
- Country: Canada
- Provinces: Alberta and British Columbia
- Range coordinates: 51°09′N 116°01′W
- Parent range: Canadian Rockies
- Topo maps: NTS 82N1 Mount Goodsir; NTS 82O4 Banff

The Ball Range is a mountain range on the Continental Divide between Vermilion Pass and Red Earth Pass in Kootenay National Park, Canada. The range is named after John Ball, a politician who helped secure funding for the Palliser expedition.

It extends over 465 km^{2} (180 sq mi), and measures 35 km (22 mi) from North to South and 26 km (16 mi) from East to West.

== Peaks ==
This range includes the following mountains and peaks:

Mountain / Peak	Elevation		Prominence		FA	Coordinates
Mountain / Peak	m	ft	m	ft	FA	Coordinates
Mount Ball	3,311	10,863	1,187	3,894	1904	51°9′23″N 116°0′23″W
Storm Mountain	3,158	10,361	408	1,339	1889	51°12′28″N 116°0′15″W
Stanley Peak	3,155	10,351	248	814	1901	51°10′14″N 116°3′15″W
Beatrice Peak	3,125	10,253	74	243	1912	51°9′46″N 116°1′30″W
Isabelle Peak	2,926	9,600	203	666	1913	51°7′34″N 116°0′34″W
Haiduk Peak	2,920	9,580	230	750	1934	51°6′9″N 115°57′4″W
Scarab Peak	2,918	9,573	713	2,339	Unk	51°5′46″N 115°55′58″W
The Monarch	2,895	9,498	555	1,821	1913	51°3′5″N 115°50′54″W
Mount Shanks	2,838	9,311	851	2,792	Unk	51°0′14″N 115°52′52″W
Copper Mountain	2,795	9,170	479	1,572	1885	51°12′33″N 115°53′7″W
