= Stanley Peak (Ball Range) =

Mountain in Kootenay NP, British Columbia, Canada

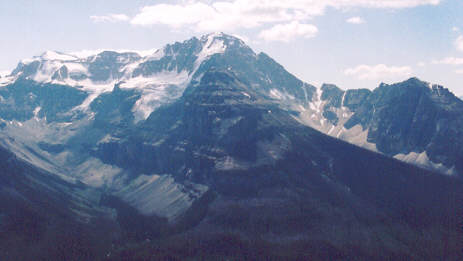
- Stanley Peak from Mt. Whymper, 2004

Highest point
- Elevation: 3,155 m (10,351 ft)
- Prominence: 248 m (814 ft)
- Listing: Mountains of British Columbia
- Coordinates: 51°10′14″N 116°03′15″W

Geography
- Location within British Columbia
- Interactive map of Stanley Peak
- Country: Canada
- Province: British Columbia
- Protected area: Kootenay National Park
- Parent range: Ball Range; Canadian Rockies
- Topo map: NTS 82N1 Mount Goodsir

Climbing
- First ascent: 1901 by Edward Whymper and guides
- Easiest route: Difficult scramble; UIAA III

Stanley Peak is a 3,155-metre (10,351 ft) mountain located in the Ball Range, at the northeastern section of Kootenay National Park, in the Canadian Rocky Mountains (British Columbia, Canada). The mountain was named in 1901 by its first climber, the English explorer Edward Whymper, after Frederick Stanley, 16th Earl of Derby, the sixth Governor-General of Canada. There are sources that date the naming in 1912 after Stanley H. Mitchell, Secretary-Treasurer of Alpine Club of Canada.

The peak is visible from the Trans-Canada Highway and Highway 93. Stanley Glacier on the northeast face of the peak can be seen up close by following a hiking trail into a hanging valley between the peak and a southern outlier of Storm Mountain.

Stanley Peak can be ascended from a scrambling route by late summer but involves much routefinding among the many ledges and gullies on the north face. Climbing routes (UIAA III) travel the north and northeast faces.

== Other BC peaks ==
There are another two peaks in British Columbia called Stanley Peak. One is 2,935 m high, located at the Squamish-Lillooet Regional District (50°49′48″N 123°43′18″W), 24 km north-west from Keyhole Falls and 62 km west from Gold Bridge. The other is 2,030 m high, in the Stikine Region (59°56′52″N 136°35′35″W) (90 km north-west from Skagway, Alaska United States).

== Geology ==
Stanley Peak is composed of sedimentary rock laid down from the Precambrian to Jurassic periods that was pushed east and over the top of younger rock during the Laramide orogeny.

== Climate ==
Based on the Köppen climate classification, the mountain is located in a subarctic climate with cold, snowy winters, and mild summers. Temperatures can drop below -20 °C with wind chill factors below -30 °C.

== Gallery ==
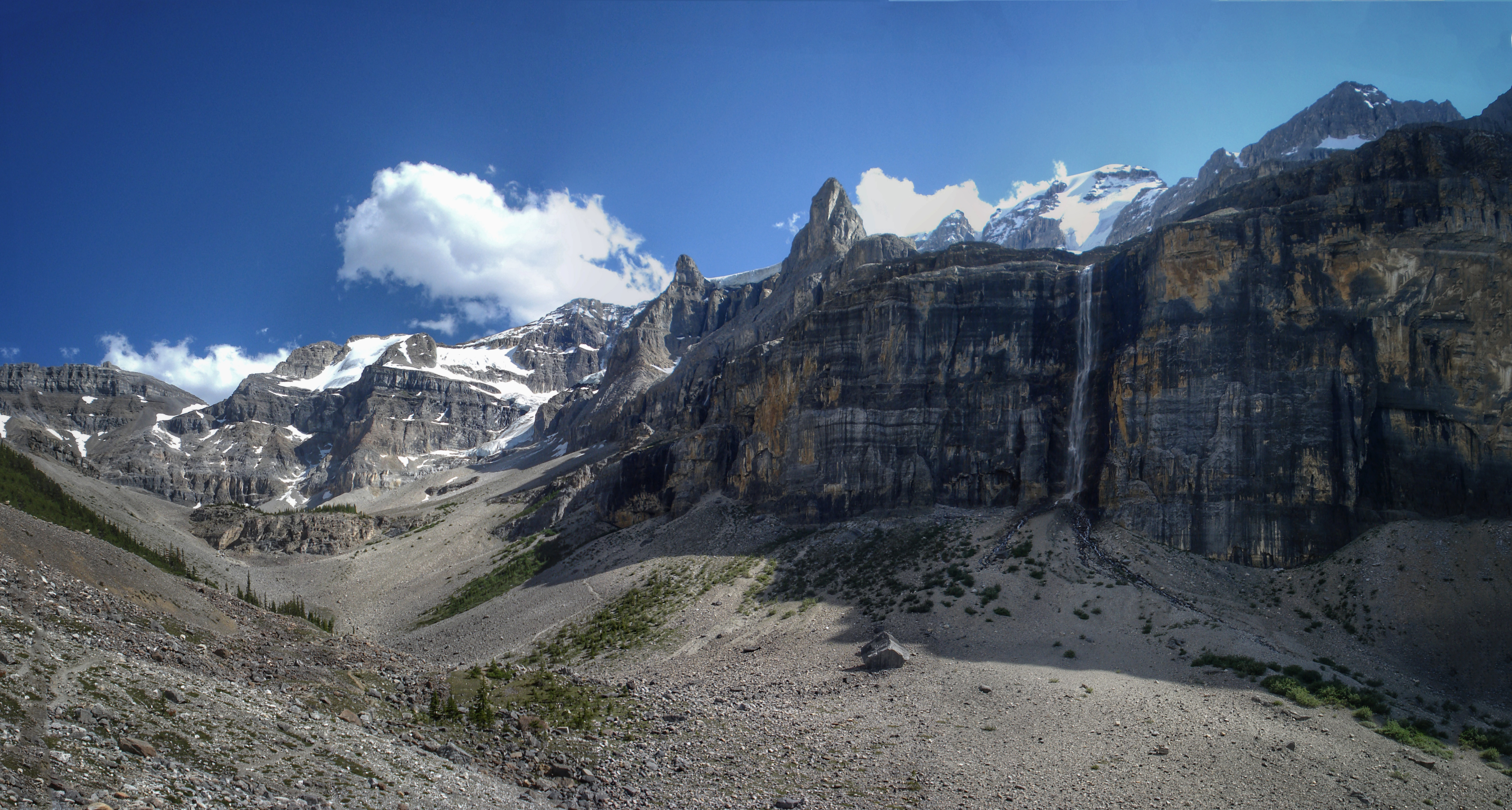
The valley below Stanley Peak and its glacier, taken from the Stanley Glacier Trail

== See also ==
- Edward Whymper
- Mount Whymper (Edward)
- Geology of the Rocky Mountains
