= Mount Ball =

Mountain in Alberta and British Columbia, Canada

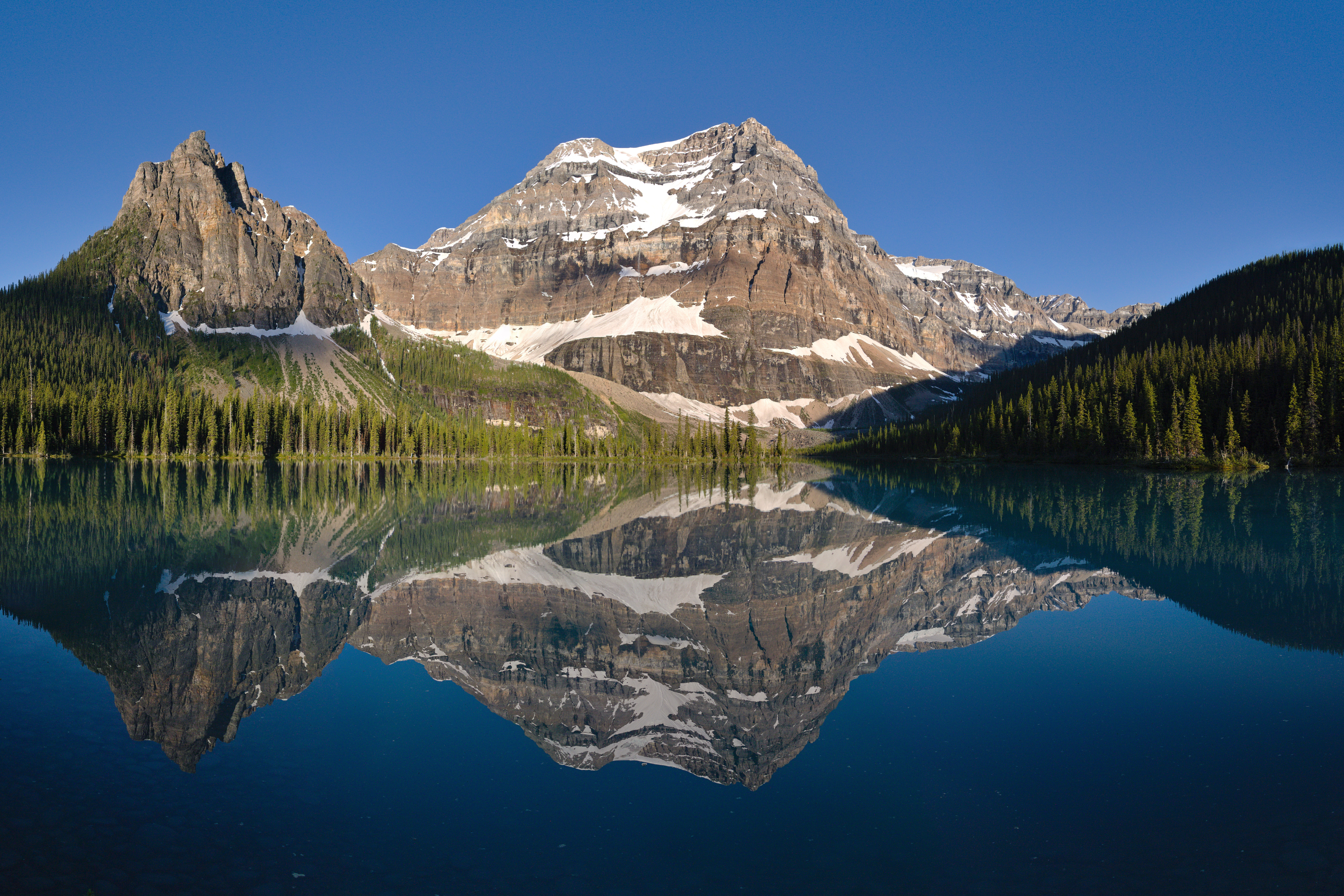
- East aspect of Mount Ball reflected in Shadow Lake

Highest point
- Elevation: 3,311 m (10,863 ft)
- Prominence: 1,187 m (3,894 ft)
- Parent peak: Deltaform Mountain
- Isolation: 23.16 km (14.39 mi)
- Listing: Mountains of Alberta; Mountains of British Columbia
- Coordinates: 51°09′22″N 116°00′22″W

Geography
- Location within British Columbia Location within Alberta Location within Canada
- Country: Canada
- Provinces: Alberta; British Columbia
- Parent range: Ball Range, Canadian Rockies
- Topo map: NTS 82N1 Mount Goodsir

Climbing
- First ascent: 1904 by J.D. Patterson, guided by Christian & Hans Kaufmann
- Easiest route: Difficult scramble

Mount Ball is a mountain located on the Continental Divide, on the borders of Banff and Kootenay national parks in Western Canada. Mt. Ball is the highest peak of the Ball Range in the Canadian Rockies.

The mountain was named in 1858 by James Hector after John Ball, a politician who helped secure funding for the Palliser expedition. The name was officially adopted in 1924 based on Palliser's 1863 map of British North America.

Mt. Ball can be ascended from a scrambling route by late summer but involves remote bushwhacking, which limits the number of attempts per year. The trailhead is located at the Marble Canyon Campground in Kootenay National Park.

== Geology ==
Mount Ball is composed of sedimentary rock laid down during the Precambrian to Jurassic periods. Formed in shallow seas, this sedimentary rock was pushed east and over the top of younger rock during the Laramide orogeny.

== Climate ==
Based on the Köppen climate classification, Mount Ball is located in a subarctic climate zone with cold, snowy winters, and mild summers. Winter temperatures can drop below −20 °C with wind chill factors below −30 °C. This climate supports glaciers on its slopes. Precipitation runoff from the east slope drains to the Bow River via Redearth Creek, and the west slope drains into tributaries of the Vermilion River.
