= Kootenay National Park =

National park in British Columbia, Canada

- Parc national Kootenay
- IUCN category II (national park)
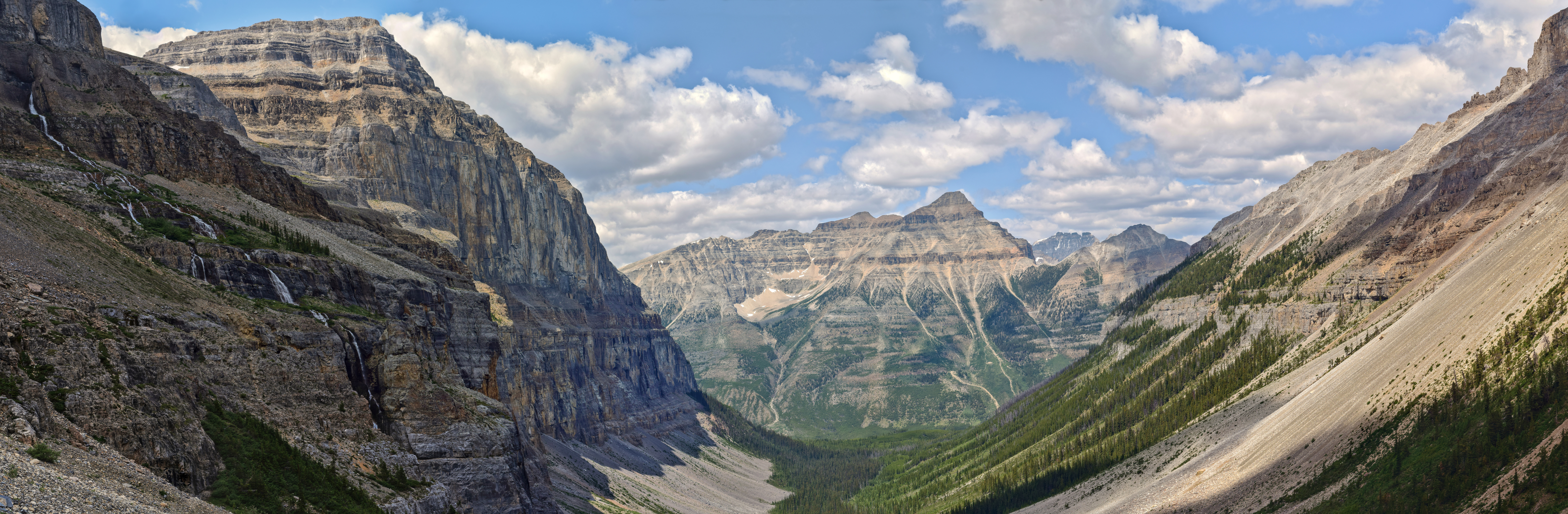
- Stanley Valley and Mount Whymper viewed from the Stanley Glacier Trail

- Location within Canada Location within British Columbia
- Interactive map of Kootenay National Park
- Location: East Kootenay, British Columbia, Canada
- Coordinates: 50°52′59″N 116°02′57″W
- Area: 1,406 km^{2} (543 sq mi)
- Established: 21 April 1920
- Visitors: 574,126 (in 2022–23)
- Governing body: Parks Canada
- Website: parks.canada.ca/pn-np/bc/kootenay

UNESCO World Heritage Site
- Part of: Canadian Rocky Mountain Parks
- Criteria: Natural: (vii), (viii)
- Reference: 304
- Inscription: 1984 (8th Session)

Kootenay National Park is a national park of Canada in southeastern British Columbia. The park consists of 1,406 km^{2} (543 sq mi) of the Canadian Rockies, including parts of the Kootenay and Park mountain ranges, the Kootenay River and the entirety of the Vermilion River. While the Vermilion River is completely contained within the park, the Kootenay River has its headwaters just outside the park boundary, flowing through the park into the Rocky Mountain Trench and eventually joining the Columbia River. The park ranges in elevation from 918 m (3,012 ft) at the southwestern park entrance to 3,424 m (11,234 ft) at Deltaform Mountain.

Initially called "Kootenay Dominion Park", the park was created in 1920 as part of an agreement between the province of British Columbia and the Canadian federal government to build a highway in exchange for title to a strip of land, approximately 8 km (5.0 mi) on either side of the 94 km route, the Banff–Windermere Highway, to be used solely for park purposes. While the park is open all year, the major tourist season lasts from June to September. Most campgrounds are open from early May to late September, while limited winter camping is available only at the Dolly Varden campground.

Kootenay National Park is one of seven contiguous national and provincial parks that form the Canadian Rocky Mountain Parks World Heritage Site. The Continental Divide is the boundary between Kootenay and Banff National Park, as well as the British Columbia–Alberta provincial border. To the northwest, the watershed boundary between the Vermilion River and the Kicking Horse River serves as the boundary between Kootenay and Yoho National Park. Mount Assiniboine Provincial Park also borders Kootenay; Jasper National Park, Mount Robson Provincial Park and Hamber Provincial Park make up the remainder of the World Heritage Site but do not share a boundary with Kootenay National Park.

== History ==
Archaeological evidence suggests humans have been either traveling through, or temporarily residing in, the area for about 10,000 years. Pictographs found in the hot spring caves indicate that Ktunaxa people first made more permanent use of the area, particularly the hot springs, several hundred years ago.

European fur traders and trappers passed through, as did George Simpson in 1841, through what would later be named Simpson Pass, during his circumnavigation of the world. Likewise, James Sinclair led Red River colonists westward and Pierre-Jean De Smet travelled eastward, through the area. The Palliser expedition used the Vermilion Pass in 1858 and reported to British government its potential as a transportation route.

On the Columbia River side, an early homesteader included the hot spring that would later become Radium Hot Springs in his land claim in the 1880s, but it was Roland Stuart and his business partner H.A. Pearse who were successful in acquiring the 160 acres (0.65 km^{2}) around the springs in 1890 as a provincial Crown grant. While they intended on bottling the spring water, its remote location prevented such development and Stuart offered to sell the property in 1909 to the Canadian Pacific Railway Company for $3000. Though the offer was not accepted, railway engineer Robert Randolph Bruce recognized the potential for a road through the area and advocated for it in 1910 with CPR president Thomas Shaughnessy and Premier Richard McBride, as a commercial link for the province to Calgary and eastern Canada. The federal government agreed to build a road from Banff to the park boundary at the provincial border at the Vermilion Pass, while the provincial government, with some funds from the CPR, would build a road from Windermere to the border. However, the BC government under-estimated its cost, found itself over-budget and its work was suspended in 1913, while the federal government completed their portion in November 1914. To get the British Columbia section completed, Bruce travelled to Ottawa to pitch the idea that they designate the western end of the route, through the Rocky Mountains, a national park so that road could be funded as a park improvement. With the popularity of Rocky Mountains Park, the Commissioner of the Parks Branch, James Bernard Harkin, and officials of the Ministry of the Interior were receptive to expanding the park system there.

In May 1916 the Minister of the Interior, William James Roche, began negotiations, and the subsequent minister agreed with the provincial counterparts to the Banff-Windermere Agreement, that the federal government would complete the road within 4 years of the end of the Great War, and maintain it thereafter, in exchange for the agreed-upon land to be used for park purposes and a resolution to jurisdictional matters in the other federal parks in BC. The agreement was signed on March 12, 1919, and the federal government took ownership of the land in July. By Order in Council 1920–0827 on April 21, 1920, the Kootenay National Park was created. The federal government repaired the provincial portion of the road and completed the remainder for public opening by June 1923.

== Attractions ==
The main attractions of the park include Radium Hot Springs, the Paint Pots, Sinclair Canyon, Marble Canyon, and Olive Lake. The hot springs offer a hot springs pool ranging from 35 to 47 °C (95 to 117 °F). Just outside the park's southwestern entrance is the town of Radium Hot Springs. The town is named for the odourless hot springs located just inside the park boundary. The town provides amenities and services for those camping within the park, and offers a number of accommodation options for those visiting the park but who do not intend to camp within.

The park's northeastern entrance, connects to Castle Junction in Banff National Park and the Trans-Canada Highway via Vermilion Pass, a mountain pass across the Continental Divide of the Canadian Rockies on the Alberta/British Columbia border, at an elevation of 1,651 metres (5,417 ft).

=== Radium Hot Springs ===
Development of the hot springs began in earnest after a British medical journal suggested, and a 1914 chemical analysis by McGill University confirmed, the presence of radium within the water. Roland Stuart, who had acquired the springs through a 160-acre (0.65 km^{2}) Crown grant, purchased 455 additional acres (1.84 km^{2}) in the vicinity of the springs as the area became accessible by the Kootenay Central Railway. Stuart travelled to England promoting the "Kootenay Radium Natural Springs Limited" and recruited the paralysed St John Harmsworth to visit. After a four-month stay he invested enough to build a bathing pool with a store and a caretaker's cottage. With the park becoming a reality, the Dominion government offered, in 1921, Stuart $20,000 for control of the springs. With his agent unable to reach him, or Stuart ignoring the offer, the government expropriated the land, in 1922, with a settlement, after numerous hearings right up to the Supreme Court, of $40,000 in 1927. In that same year, a new two-storey bath-house was erected and the pool lengthened by 30 feet (9.1 m). Meanwhile, the town of Radium Hot Springs was being developed after the 1923 subdivision to create commercial properties and the Canadian Pacific Railway Company developed cabins the area that would later become the Radium Hot Springs Lodge. The facility was re-built after a fire in 1948 at the cost of $1,000,000 with a concrete pool and other facilities. Major renovations and improvements between 1960 and 1968 added additional capacity, a restaurant, and a campground (at the Redstreak Campground), as well as buying out the CPR cabin properties. Another round of renovations occurred in 1997 with a new hot-cold plunge pool added.

=== Paint Pots ===
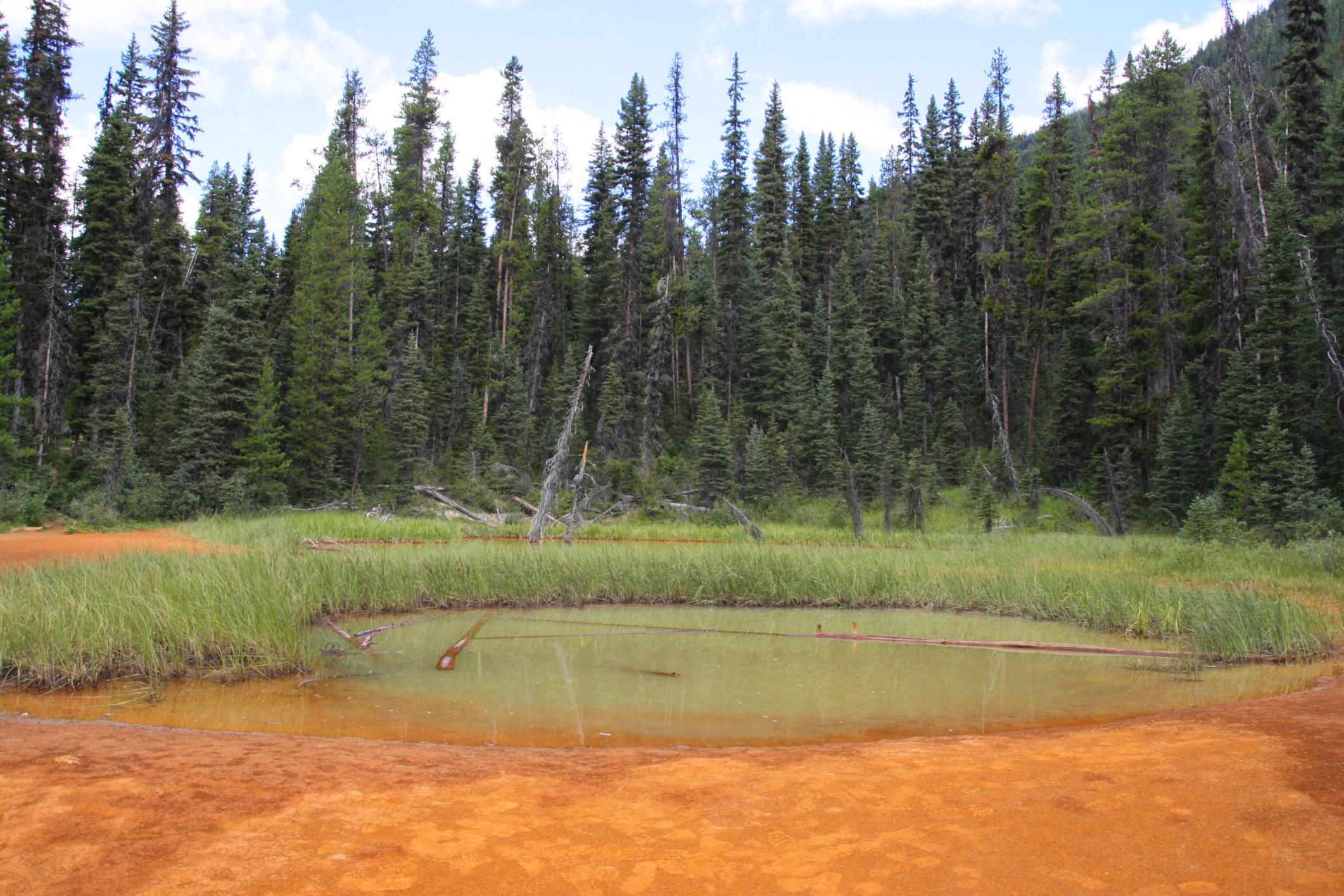
One of the Paint Pots

The Paint Pots are an acidic, cold water, mineral spring system from which ochre is deposited at spring outlets. The minerals are principally iron oxide which produces the water and mud's reddish colour but other similar minerals can also be present and vary the colours to include various shades of yellow, red and brown. The acidic, metal-rich water has limited capacity to support living species, but at least 14 species of algae, one liverwort and one moss species, as well as some extremophilic bacteria, have been identified living in those waters. The ochre was collected by the Ktunaxa people for use as pigments and the iron oxide was commercially mined for use in paint manufacturing for nearly two decades until the park was established in 1920.

Because of the relatively small width of the park (five miles on each side of the highway), many of the park's attractions are situated near the road and are wheelchair accessible. A number of forest fires in the northern half of the park in the Simpson River, Vermilion Pass, and Floe Creek areas in 2003 and 2004 have left significant burn areas readily visible from the highway. Numa Falls is a short drive south of Marble Canyon and is accessible directly by Highway 93 which cuts through the park.

=== Hiking and camping ===
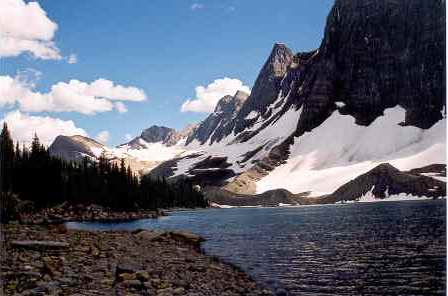
Floe Lake taken from the Floe Lake backcountry campground, July 2004

The Rockwall trail is a multi-day hike along the limestone cliff eastern escarpment of the Vermilion Range that continues into Yoho National Park. There are several connections to the trail from the highway, including the 10.7 km Floe Creek trail to Floe Lake campground and the 6 km Numa Creek trail to the Numa Falls campground. There is another trailhead at the Paint Pots that follows Ochre Creek with forks to the 7 km Tumbling Creek trail and the 9 km Helmet Creek trail, both of which have campgrounds. Beyond Helmet Falls the Rockwall trail continues through Goodsir Pass into Yoho National Park. Other multi-day backcountry hikes include the Tokumun Creek trail to Fay Hut and Neil Colgan Hut, the Simpson River trail into Mount Assiniboine Provincial Park, the Hawk Creek trail through Ball Pass into Banff National Park, the Verdant trail from Vermilion Crossing to Banff National Park via the Honeymoon Pass and the Redearth Pass.

Day hikes with nearby campgrounds include trails on Redstreak Mountain and along Redstreak Creek, the Dog Lake trail from the McLeod Meadows campground, and the Marble Canyon to Paint Pots trail from the Marble Canyon campground. Other dayhikes, of various difficulty levels, include trails to Olive Lake, to Cobb Lake, the Kindersley/Sinclair loop, the Tokumun Creek trail from Marble Canyon to Kaufmann Lake, the Kimpton Creek trail, the Verendrye Creek from Vermilion Crossing, and the Stanley Creek trail. The Dolly Varden trail along Dolly Varden Creek (the fish was later identified as bull trout, not Dolly Varden trout) permits cycling.

== Geography ==
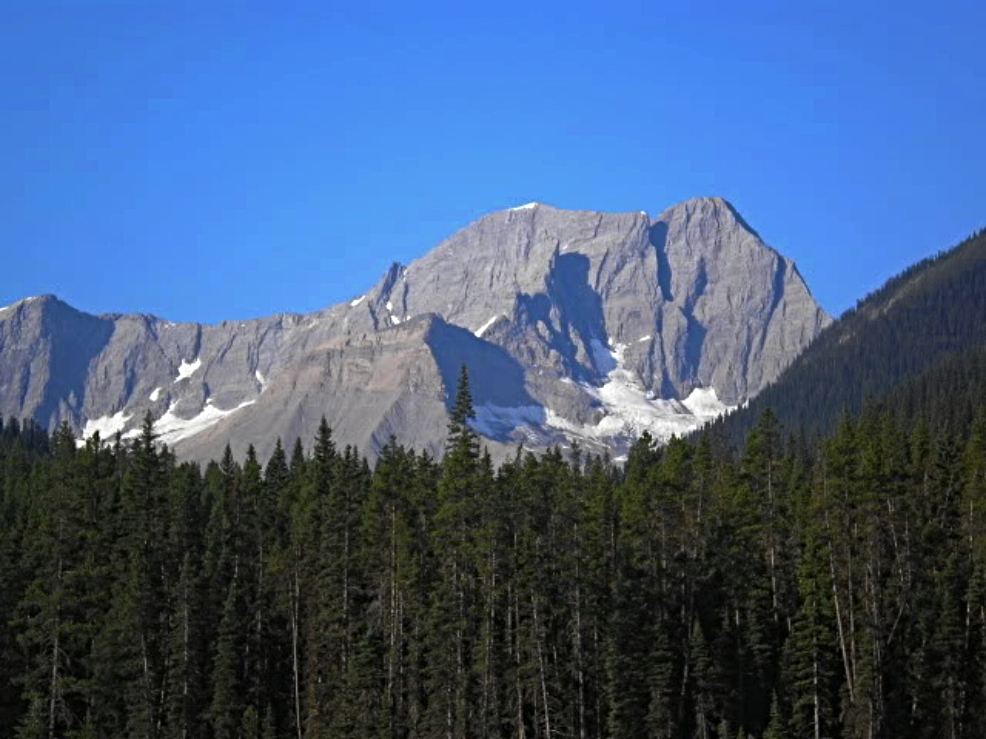
Hewitt Peak in the Vermilion Range seen from Highway 93

The park is centered around the 94 km stretch of the Highway 93, from Radium Hot Springs to the provincial border at the Vermilion Pass. The park's size and shape are the result of the federal-provincial agreement to get the road constructed. Consequently, despite the northwest–southeast trending range and valley systems, the park cuts through several mountain ranges and river valleys.

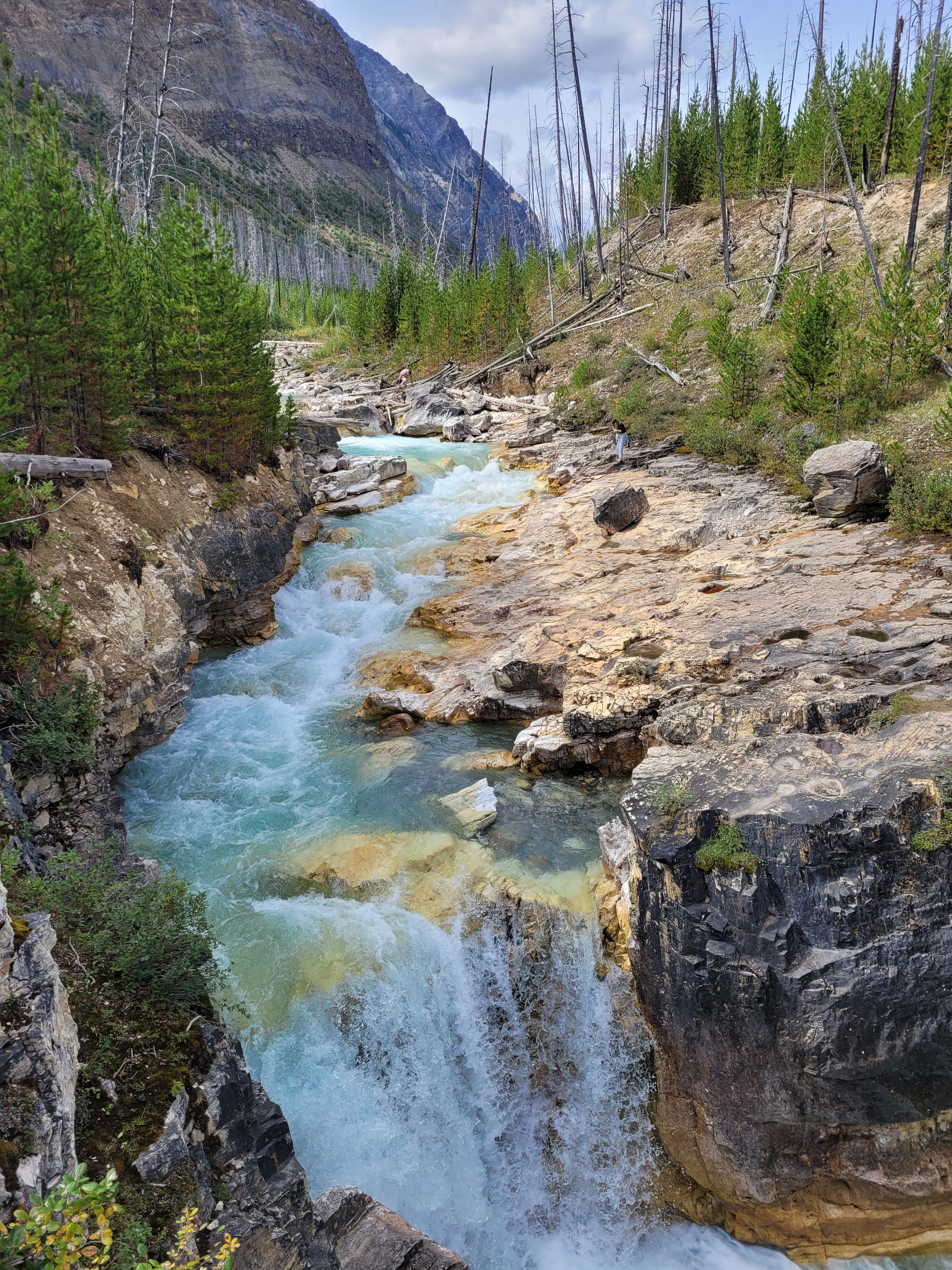
Kootenay River near Marble Canyon in Kootenay National Park (2021)

The park's southwestern entrance, near Radium Hot Springs and the Sinclair Canyon, is the only part of the park within Southern Rocky Mountain Trench. As the highway follows Sinclair Creek, which drains westward towards the Columbia River, the park enters the Kootenay Ranges, which include Mount Berland and the western and southern faces of Mount Kindersley of the Brisco Range and Redstreak Mountain and Mount Sinclair of the Stanford Range. The eastern side of Mount Sinclair faces the valley of the Kootenay River; that and the remainder of the park drains to the Kootenay River which does eventually empty into the Columbia River but not until well outside the park and crossing the American-Canadian border twice.

The park covers a ≈27 km stretch of the Kootenay River valley including the flanking mountain faces of Mount Kindersley and the Mitchell Range and Vermilion Range of the western portion of the Park Ranges. At the bridge over Kootenay River, the road and park divert northward to follow the Vermilion River upstream through the pass between Mount Wardle of the Vermilion Range and Spar Mountain of the Mitchell Range. As the park bends northward here, it expands to include more of the Kootenay River valley, including Dolly Varden Creek, Lost Creek, and Whitetail Creek.

With the Mount Assiniboine Park just over the mountains to the southeast, the road and park divert northwestward again once into the valley of the Vermilion River, near where it converges with the Simpson River. After this, the park consists of the remainder of the Vermilion River drainage basin, with the Banff National Park at the Continental Divide to the north at the Ball Range and the Bow Range, the Yoho National Park to the northwest, and the peaks of the Vermilion Range to the southwest. A small portion of the Ottertail River, which drains into the Yoho National Park, is also included the northwestern end of the park, though the remainder of that border is the dividing line between the Vermilion River and the Kicking Horse River.

There are only a few, small lakes in the park, most of which occur in the Vermilion River drainage basin and occur at high altitude in cirques or hanging valleys, which is typical for the Main Ranges. The Floe, Kaufmann and Talc lakes occur here, while the Dog, Olive and Cobb lakes occur in the Kootenay River basin and have more pond-like characteristics such as shallow depth and slower flow.

== Geology ==
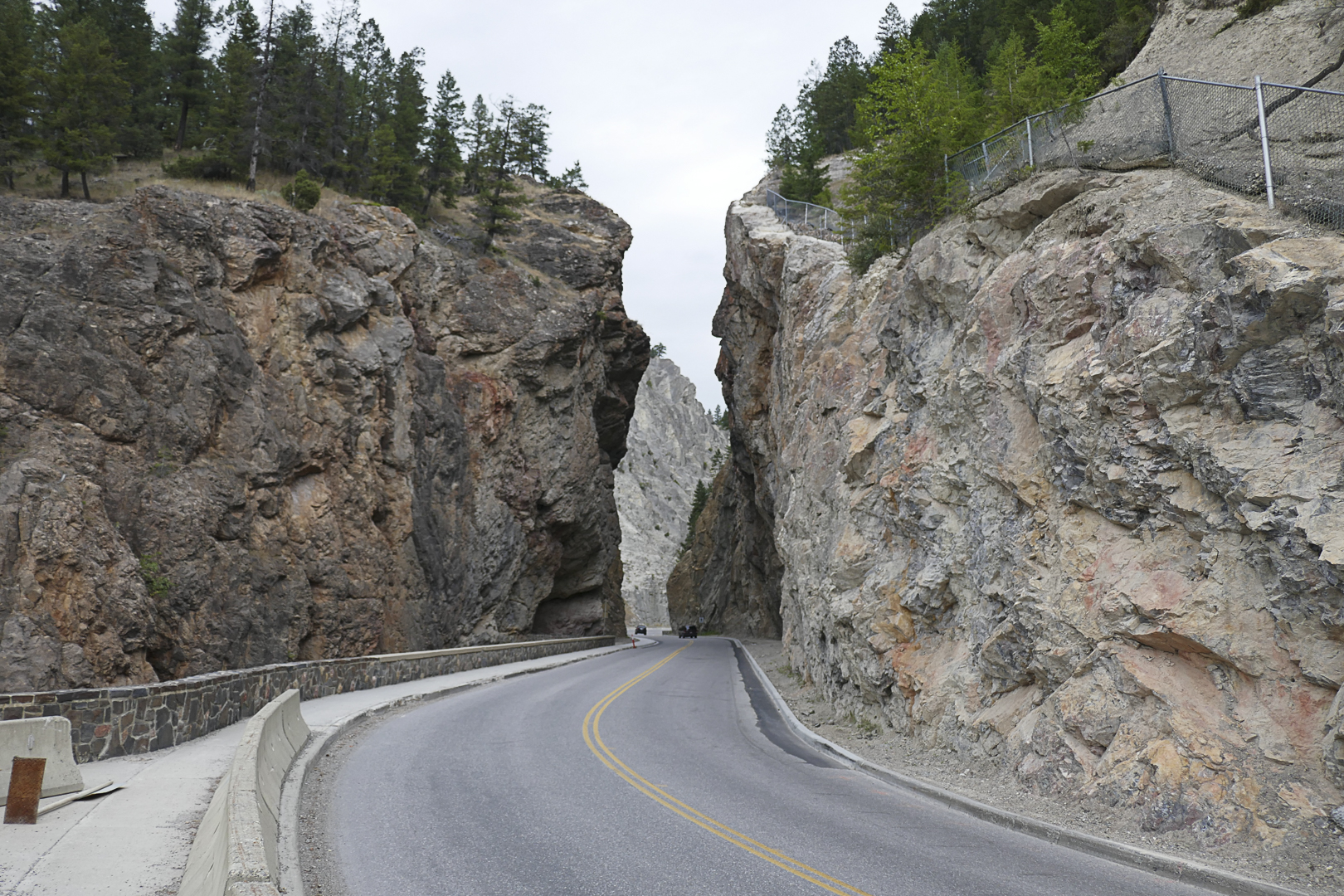
Sinclair Canyon

The geology of the park is dominated by mountains made up of exposed faulted sedimentary rock and valleys containing glacial till deposited in the Pleistocene.

Just outside the northwestern corner of the park, there is an igneous intrusion known as the Ice River Complex containing deposits of sodalite, an ornamental stone. The hills immediately around the hot springs are composed mainly of tufa, a calcium carbonate deposit that forms by precipitation of supersaturated hot spring water when it reaches cooler surface water.

The rocks in southwestern corner of the park are part of the older Purcell Mountains range while the eastern park mountains are part of the younger Rocky Mountains range.

The park has many Cambrian strata of oceanic sedimentary origin that shed insight into the explosive radiation of multicellular life on Earth. In the summer of 2012 a team of scientists from the Royal Ontario Museum, Pomona College, the University of Toronto, the University of Saskatchewan and Uppsala University discovered a Lagerstätte site above Marble Canyon of extraordinary preservation in shale, comparable to the Burgess Shale's phyllopod bed of fossils only 42 kilometres (26 mi) distant, in Yoho National Park. One species Kootenichela discovered in these rocks has been scientifically described: more than 50 new species were discovered in the Marble Canyon area in just two weeks of intensive exploration. The new assemblage of organisms, dating to the Wuliuan, such as the Surusicaris elegans, is described as rich in basal arthropods and remarkable for the density and diversity of its soft-bodied organisms, some preserved in previously unreported detail.

== Climate ==
The park experiences a humid continental climate (Dfb) which is characterized by brief, cool summers and long snowy winters, but is generally drier than the areas to the west due to the Kootenay Ranges capturing moisture. Similarly, the park's mountain ranges intercept moisture that would otherwise fall on the other side of the Continental Divide, making the Banff National Park drier. Combined with the Continental Divide protecting it from the brunt of the arctic air flow, the park experiences a more mild climate than Banff.

Based on the climate and geography, the park has been divided into different ecoregions: Montane, Subalpine and Alpine, which consequently affect vegetation and wildlife. The Montane ecoregions are at lower elevations, such as at the park's west gate and the valley of the Kootenay River, and experience between 300 and 600 mm of precipitation each year, 30 to 45% of which falls as snow. The subalpine ecoregion, such as the valley of the Vermilion River and at Floe Lake and Marble Canyon, experience cooler and moister weather, with mean annual temperatures less than 1 degrees Celsius and about 800 mm of precipitation, over half of which is snow. The alpine ecoregion, at the park's highest elevations, is even colder and snowier, which results in a lack of forest cover.

Climate data for Kootenay National Park West Gate (1981–2010 normals, extremes 1968–2022)
Month	Jan	Feb	Mar	Apr	May	Jun	Jul	Aug	Sep	Oct	Nov	Dec	Year
Record high °C (°F)	9.5 (49.1)	9.5 (49.1)	22.0 (71.6)	29.4 (84.9)	33.5 (92.3)	34.0 (93.2)	37.0 (98.6)	37.5 (99.5)	34.5 (94.1)	24.0 (75.2)	16.7 (62.1)	10.0 (50.0)	37.5 (99.5)
Mean daily maximum °C (°F)	−3.9 (25.0)	0.0 (32.0)	6.9 (44.4)	13.3 (55.9)	18.4 (65.1)	22.0 (71.6)	25.6 (78.1)	25.2 (77.4)	18.5 (65.3)	9.9 (49.8)	0.9 (33.6)	−4.7 (23.5)	11.0 (51.8)
Daily mean °C (°F)	−6.8 (19.8)	−4.2 (24.4)	1.7 (35.1)	7.0 (44.6)	11.8 (53.2)	15.5 (59.9)	18.4 (65.1)	17.8 (64.0)	12.0 (53.6)	5.1 (41.2)	−1.9 (28.6)	−7.3 (18.9)	5.8 (42.4)
Mean daily minimum °C (°F)	−9.7 (14.5)	−8.3 (17.1)	−3.5 (25.7)	0.7 (33.3)	5.1 (41.2)	8.9 (48.0)	11.2 (52.2)	10.2 (50.4)	5.4 (41.7)	0.3 (32.5)	−4.7 (23.5)	−9.7 (14.5)	0.5 (32.9)
Record low °C (°F)	−35.6 (−32.1)	−35.0 (−31.0)	−23.0 (−9.4)	−13.3 (8.1)	−4.5 (23.9)	−0.6 (30.9)	3.0 (37.4)	2.0 (35.6)	−5.5 (22.1)	−15.6 (3.9)	−30.5 (−22.9)	−37.8 (−36.0)	−37.8 (−36.0)
Average precipitation mm (inches)	33.2 (1.31)	19.4 (0.76)	19.9 (0.78)	31.2 (1.23)	47.0 (1.85)	69.0 (2.72)	53.6 (2.11)	40.7 (1.60)	35.0 (1.38)	26.2 (1.03)	35.9 (1.41)	30.1 (1.19)	441.2 (17.37)
Average rainfall mm (inches)	5.9 (0.23)	5.7 (0.22)	12.1 (0.48)	26.9 (1.06)	45.9 (1.81)	69.0 (2.72)	53.6 (2.11)	40.7 (1.60)	35.0 (1.38)	24.5 (0.96)	18.0 (0.71)	4.6 (0.18)	341.9 (13.46)
Average snowfall cm (inches)	27.2 (10.7)	13.6 (5.4)	7.7 (3.0)	4.3 (1.7)	1.1 (0.4)	0.1 (0.0)	0.0 (0.0)	0.0 (0.0)	0.0 (0.0)	1.7 (0.7)	17.9 (7.0)	25.5 (10.0)	99.1 (38.9)
Average precipitation days (≥ 0.2 mm)	11.6	7.0	8.5	9.9	13.6	16.1	12.9	11.4	9.6	11.2	11.1	10.5	133.5
Average rainy days (≥ 0.2 mm)	2.4	2.6	6.2	9.4	13.5	16.1	12.9	11.4	9.6	10.7	6.1	1.9	102.8
Average snowy days (≥ 0.2 cm)	9.9	5.0	3.0	1.2	0.2	0.0	0.0	0.0	0.0	1.0	6.0	9.2	35.5
Source: Environment Canada

Climate data for Kootenay Crossing, BC (1981–2010 normals, extremes 1965–2002)
Month	Jan	Feb	Mar	Apr	May	Jun	Jul	Aug	Sep	Oct	Nov	Dec	Year
Record high °C (°F)	10.0 (50.0)	11.1 (52.0)	18.0 (64.4)	28.3 (82.9)	33.0 (91.4)	32.5 (90.5)	35.0 (95.0)	36.5 (97.7)	33.3 (91.9)	23.5 (74.3)	14.4 (57.9)	6.7 (44.1)	36.5 (97.7)
Mean daily maximum °C (°F)	−4.8 (23.4)	−0.4 (31.3)	5.9 (42.6)	10.9 (51.6)	16.4 (61.5)	19.7 (67.5)	23.2 (73.8)	23.0 (73.4)	17.6 (63.7)	8.9 (48.0)	−0.2 (31.6)	−6.6 (20.1)	9.5 (49.0)
Daily mean °C (°F)	−9.7 (14.5)	−6.9 (19.6)	−1.0 (30.2)	3.8 (38.8)	8.4 (47.1)	11.8 (53.2)	14.5 (58.1)	13.8 (56.8)	8.9 (48.0)	2.6 (36.7)	−4.5 (23.9)	−10.9 (12.4)	2.6 (36.6)
Mean daily minimum °C (°F)	−14.3 (6.3)	−13.1 (8.4)	−7.8 (18.0)	−3.3 (26.1)	0.3 (32.5)	3.9 (39.0)	5.8 (42.4)	4.6 (40.3)	0.2 (32.4)	−3.7 (25.3)	−8.7 (16.3)	−15.1 (4.8)	−4.3 (24.3)
Record low °C (°F)	−42.8 (−45.0)	−39.0 (−38.2)	−34.4 (−29.9)	−22.2 (−8.0)	−10.0 (14.0)	−5.6 (21.9)	−6.5 (20.3)	−4.5 (23.9)	−10.0 (14.0)	−22.5 (−8.5)	−38.0 (−36.4)	−42.8 (−45.0)	−42.8 (−45.0)
Average precipitation mm (inches)	39.5 (1.56)	20.7 (0.81)	23.0 (0.91)	34.6 (1.36)	55.8 (2.20)	74.4 (2.93)	63.1 (2.48)	52.5 (2.07)	43.3 (1.70)	35.8 (1.41)	40.3 (1.59)	38.5 (1.52)	521.5 (20.54)
Average rainfall mm (inches)	2.7 (0.11)	1.6 (0.06)	6.5 (0.26)	23.7 (0.93)	53.7 (2.11)	74.1 (2.92)	63.1 (2.48)	52.5 (2.07)	42.7 (1.68)	28.9 (1.14)	11.2 (0.44)	1.3 (0.05)	362.1 (14.26)
Average snowfall cm (inches)	36.8 (14.5)	19.0 (7.5)	16.4 (6.5)	10.9 (4.3)	2.1 (0.8)	0.3 (0.1)	0.0 (0.0)	0.0 (0.0)	0.6 (0.2)	6.9 (2.7)	29.1 (11.5)	37.2 (14.6)	159.3 (62.7)
Average precipitation days (≥ 0.2 mm)	12.2	6.7	7.2	9.9	15.3	16.9	14.3	13.4	10.7	10.6	11.5	11.3	139.9
Average rainy days (≥ 0.2 mm)	0.64	0.65	2.1	7.4	15.0	16.9	14.3	13.4	10.6	9.3	3.3	0.42	94.0
Average snowy days (≥ 0.2 cm)	11.7	6.3	5.4	3.3	0.91	0.09	0.0	0.0	0.36	2.4	9.2	11.4	51.0
Source: Environment Canada

== Ecology ==
=== Flora ===
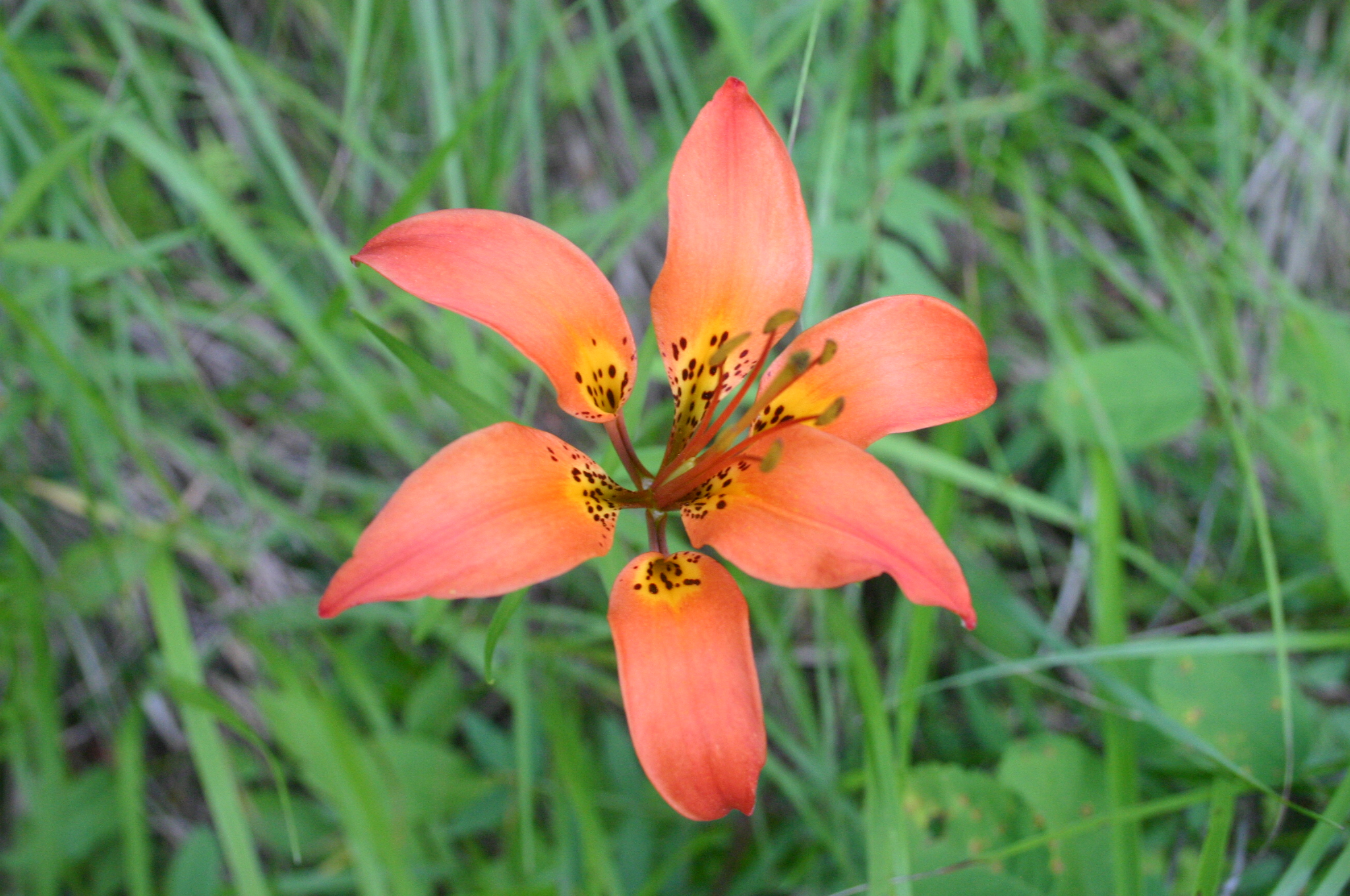
Wood lily along Dog Lake Trail

The Montane Spruce biogeoclimatic zone of the park's lower elevations contain forests of mostly Douglas fir, lodgepole pine, western larch, trembling poplar, and western redcedar. The shrub layer mostly include soapberry, kinnikinnick, western showy aster, dwarf bilberry, twinflower, pinegrass, Canadian bunchberry, littleleaf huckleberry, Rocky Mountain maple, alder, mountain huckleberry, oval-leaf blueberry, meadow horsetail, Devil's club, as well as common and rocky mountain juniper. In the higher subalpine elevations, the Engelmann Spruce-Subalpine Fir biogeoclimatic zone takes over with its dominant tree species of Engelmann spruce, white spruce, subalpine fir and subalpine larch, begin to take over at higher elevations. Heathers, arctic willow, cinquefoils, moss campion, and mountain avens are the dominant vegetation in the alpine areas.

Forest fires that affected the park, exemplified by the large fires of 1968 and 2017 and the very large fire of 2003 in the Vermilion area, feature pioneering vegetation like fireweed and lodgepole pine. An emerging drier climate, and forest fires, are resulting in the Interior Douglas-fir biogeoclimatic zone expanding into the park, with its more dominant Douglas fir, ponderosa pine and rocky mountain juniper tree stands.

=== Fauna ===
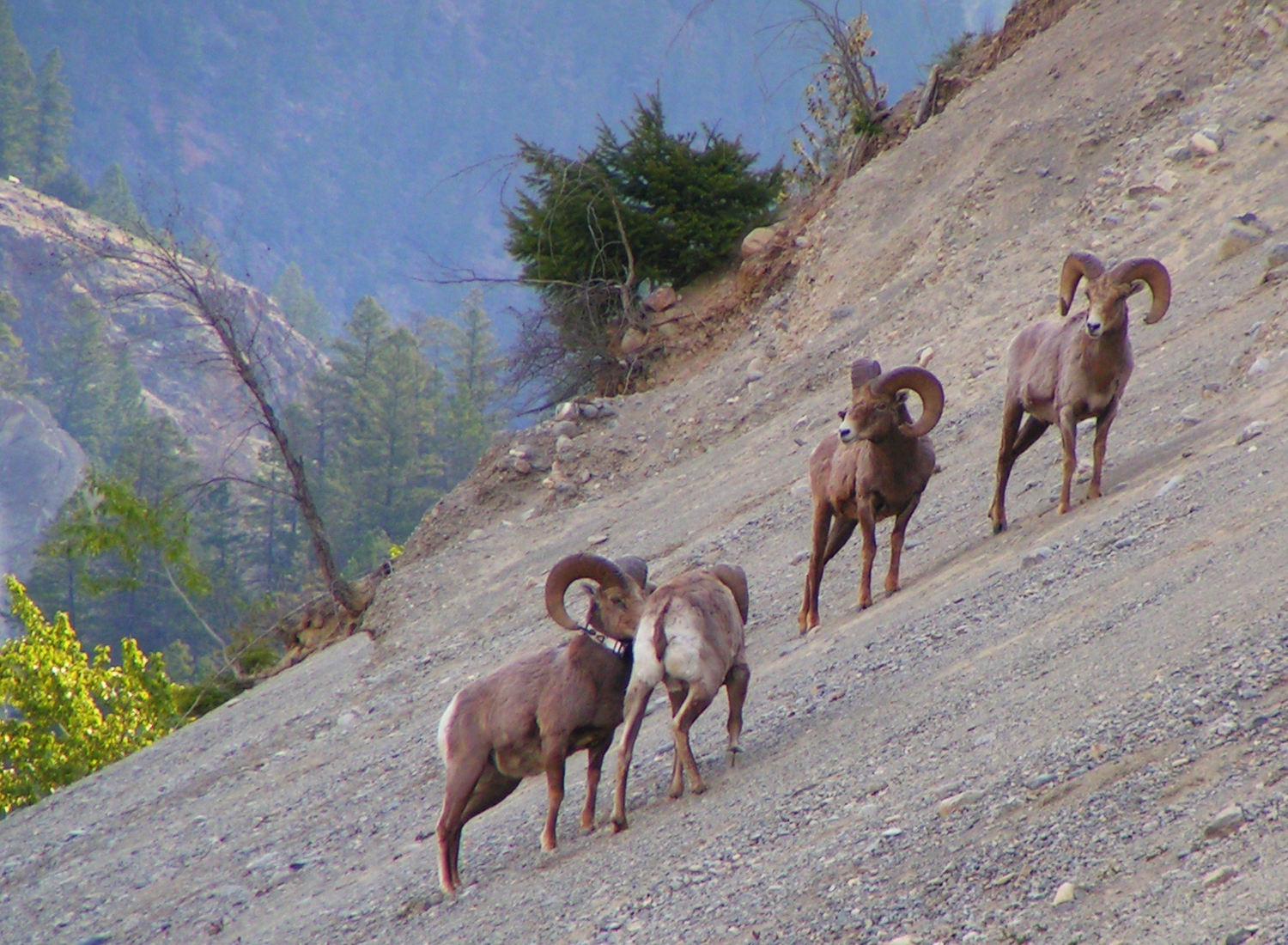
Bighorn sheep scaling a scree-covered slope in Kootenay National Park

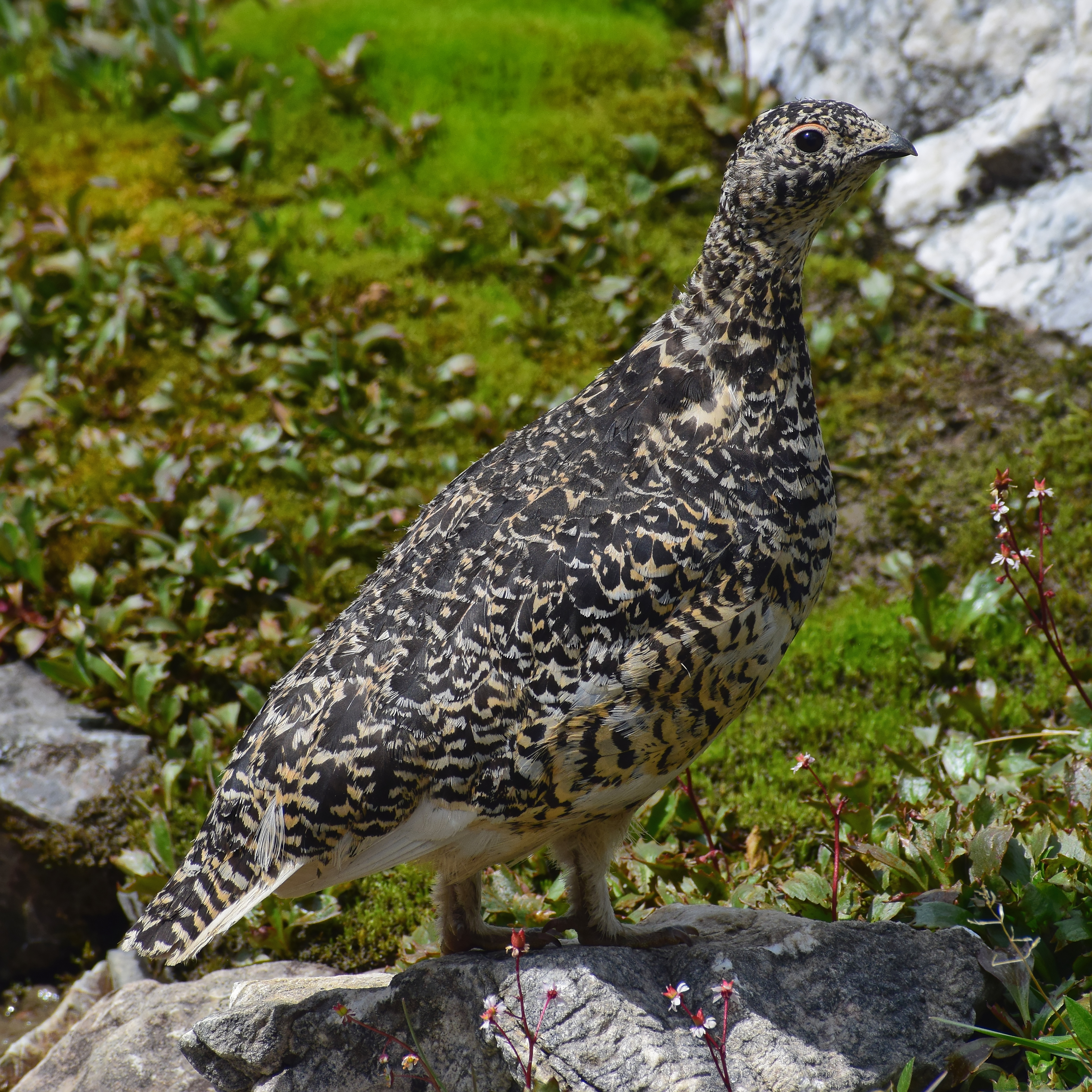
Female spruce grouse, Stanley Valley

A wildlife survey found 242 species of mammals, birds, amphibians and reptiles. The largest species are the ungulates, such as the bighorn sheep, mountain goat, moose, elk, red deer, white-tailed deer, mule deer, though there are also black bears and grizzly bears that live in the park. Coyotes and martens are the only widespread and common carnivores in the park, though bobcats and cougars live in the southern regions. Timber wolves, lynxes, wolverines, minks, fishers, badgers, river otters, skunks and long and short-tailed weasels have also been identified but are not common. The most common non-carnivorous mammal species living in the park are the snowshoe hare, red-backed vole, deer mouse, red squirrel and Columbian ground squirrel.

Most bird species only use the park as their summer grounds or part of their migration route; only 32 species live solely in the park. Some of the most common birds include the boreal owl, yellow-rumped warbler, golden-crowned kinglet, common yellowthroat, American robin, spotted sandpiper, chipping sparrow, two-barred crossbill, rufous hummingbird, water pipit. Other bird species that may be observed include the common loon, Canada and Steller's jays, Canada and snow geese, trumpeter and Tundra swans. The three reptiles identified were the rubber boa, common garter snake and western terrestrial garter snake.

== World Heritage Site ==
In 1984, UNESCO added the Canadian Rocky Mountain Parks World Heritage Site, to the World Heritage List. This World Heritage Site included the four contiguous national parks: Kootenay, Banff, Jasper and Yoho. At the time, the site was deemed to meet the natural criteria for examples of geological processes, record of life, and for exceptional natural beauty. In 1990, the Mount Assiniboine, Mount Robson and Hamber Provincial Parks were added to the World Heritage Site, bringing its total area up to 22,991 km^{2} (8,877 sq mi). Under their Statement of Significance, UNESCO states "With rugged mountain peaks, icefields and glaciers, alpine meadows, lakes, waterfalls, extensive karst cave systems and deeply incised canyons, the Canadian Rocky Mountain Parks possess exceptional natural beauty, attracting millions of visitors annually."

== See also ==
- National Parks of Canada
- List of National Parks of Canada
