= Limestone Peak (British Columbia) =

Mountain in British Columbia, Canada

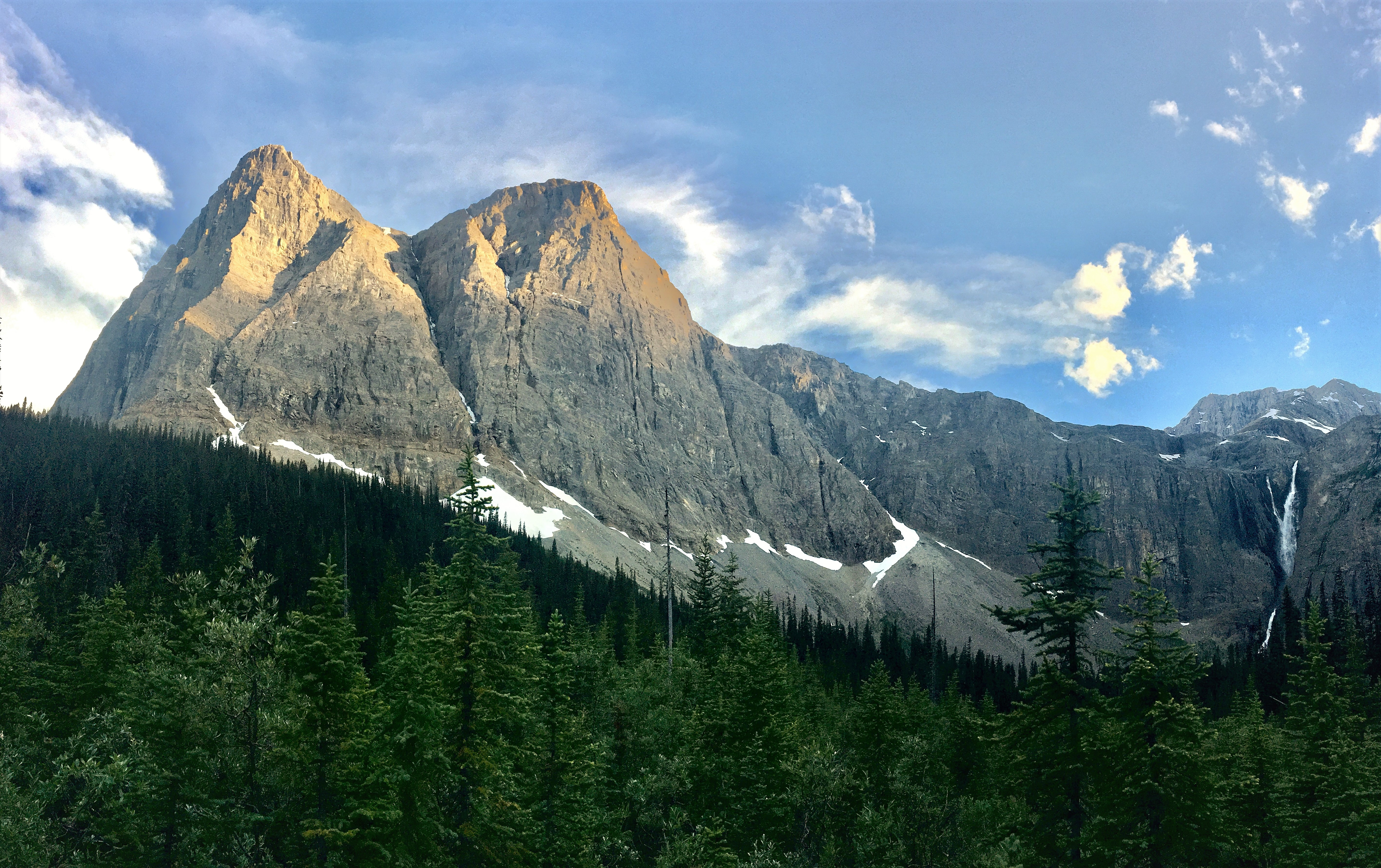
- North aspect, with Helmet Falls to right

Highest point
- Elevation: 2,878 m (9,442 ft)
- Prominence: 51 m (167 ft)
- Isolation: 1.57 km (0.98 mi)
- Listing: Mountains of British Columbia
- Coordinates: 51°11′00″N 116°17′53″W

Geography
- Location within British Columbia Location within Canada
- Interactive map of Limestone Peak
- Location: Kootenay National Park; British Columbia, Canada
- District: Kootenay Land District
- Parent range: Vermilion Range; Canadian Rockies
- Topo map: NTS 82N1 Mount Goodsir

Geology
- Rock age: Cambrian
- Rock type: Ottertail Limestone

Limestone Peak is a 2,878-metre (9,442-foot) mountain summit located in British Columbia, Canada.

== Description ==
Limestone Peak is situated on the western boundary of Kootenay National Park at the northern end of the Vermilion Range, which is a sub-range of the Canadian Rockies. The peak also anchors the northern end of what is known as the Rockwall which is an escarpment of the Vermilion Range. The Rockwall Trail is a scenic 55 kilometer (34 mile) traverse of alpine passes, subalpine meadows, hanging glaciers, and limestone cliffs, in some places in excess of 900 m (2,953 ft) above the trail. Helmet Falls, located one kilometer west of the peak, is another scenic feature of the Rockwall area. Neighbors include Mount Goodsir eight kilometers to the west-northwest and Mount Drysdale four kilometers to the south-southeast. Precipitation runoff from the mountain drains to the Vermilion River via Helmet Creek and Ochre Creek. Topographic relief is significant as the summit rises over 1,100 meters (3,609 feet) above Helmet Creek in one kilometer (0.6 mile). Limestone Peak is composed of Ottertail limestone, a sedimentary rock laid down during the Cambrian period and pushed east and over the top of younger rock during the Laramide orogeny. The mountain's toponym was officially adopted in 1952 by the Geographical Names Board of Canada.

== Climate ==
Based on the Köppen climate classification, Limestone Peak is located in a subarctic climate zone with cold, snowy winters, and mild summers. Winter temperatures can drop below −20 °C with wind chill factors below −30 °C. This climate supports the Washmawapta Glacier on the peak's south slope.

== See also ==
- Geography of British Columbia
