= Mount Verendrye =

Mountain in British Columbia, Canada

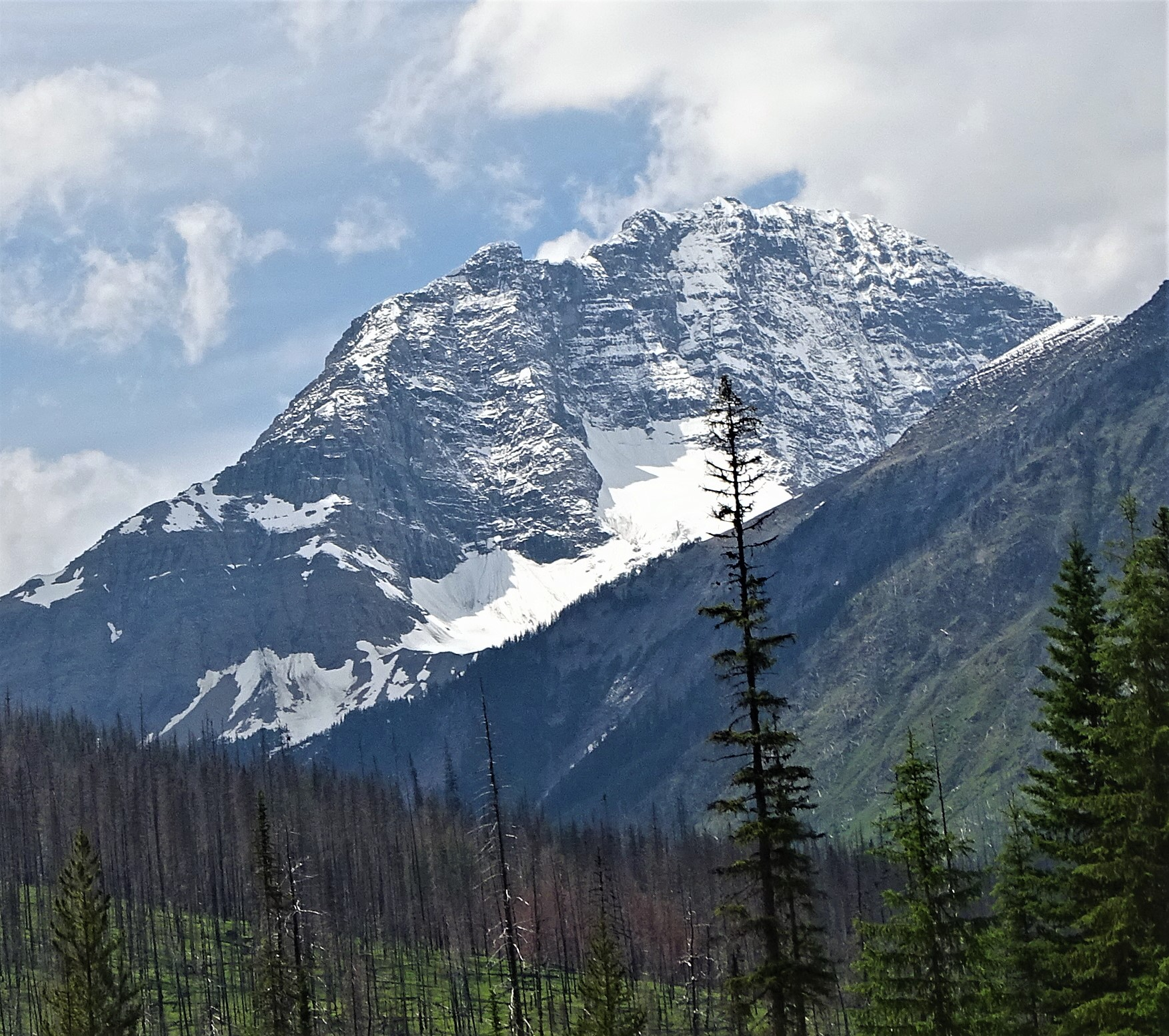
- East aspect

Highest point
- Elevation: 3,086 m (10,125 ft)
- Prominence: 515 m (1,690 ft)
- Parent peak: Foster Peak (3,201 m)
- Isolation: 9.14 km (5.68 mi)
- Listing: Mountains of British Columbia
- Coordinates: 51°00′20″N 116°04′31″W

Naming
- Etymology: Pierre de La Vérendrye

Geography
- Location within British Columbia Location within Canada
- Interactive map of Mount Verendrye
- Country: Canada
- Province: British Columbia
- District: Kootenay Land District
- Protected area: Kootenay National Park
- Parent range: Vermilion Range; Canadian Rockies
- Topo map: NTS 82N1 Mount Goodsir

Geology
- Rock age: Cambrian
- Rock type: Ottertail Limestone

Climbing
- First ascent: 1922 by Morrison Bridgland

Mount Verendrye is a 3,086-metre (10,125-foot) mountain summit located in British Columbia, Canada.

== Description ==
Mount Verendrye is situated on the western boundary of Kootenay National Park near the southern end of the Vermilion Range, which is a sub-range of the Canadian Rockies. The peak is the southern end of what is known as the Rockwall which is an escarpment of the Vermilion Range. The Rockwall Trail is a scenic 55 kilometer (34 mile) traverse of alpine passes, subalpine meadows, hanging glaciers, and limestone cliffs, in some places in excess of 900 m (2,953 ft) above the trail. Neighbors include Floe Peak six kilometers to the northwest and Mount Wardle six kilometers to the southeast. Topographic relief is significant as the summit rises 1,820 metres (5,970 ft) above the Banff–Windermere Highway in six kilometers (3.7 miles). A roadside pullout along the highway near Verendrye Creek provides a view of the mountain and the scorched Verendrye Creek valley which burned in 2003. Precipitation runoff from the mountain drains west to the Kootenay River via Whitetail Creek, and east into Verendrye and Serac Creeks which are tributaries of the Vermilion River. Mount Verendrye is composed of Ottertail limestone, a sedimentary rock laid down during the Cambrian period and pushed east and over the top of younger rock during the Laramide orogeny.

== History ==
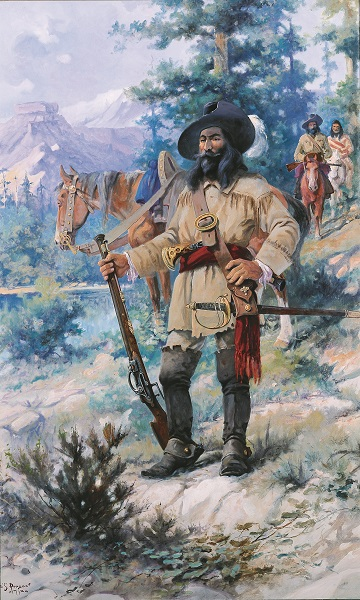
La Verendrye

The mountain's toponym was applied in 1884 by Canadian surveyor George Mercer Dawson and was officially adopted in 1952 by the Geographical Names Board of Canada to honor Pierre Gaultier de Varennes, sieur de La Vérendrye (1685–1749), a French Canadian military officer, fur trader, and explorer. The first ascent of the summit was made in 1922 by Morrison P. Bridgland (1878–1948), a Dominion Land Surveyor who climbed and named many peaks in the Canadian Rockies.

== Climate ==
Based on the Köppen climate classification, Mount Verendrye is located in a subarctic climate zone with cold, snowy winters, and mild summers. Winter temperatures can drop below −20 °C with wind chill factors below −30 °C.

== Gallery ==
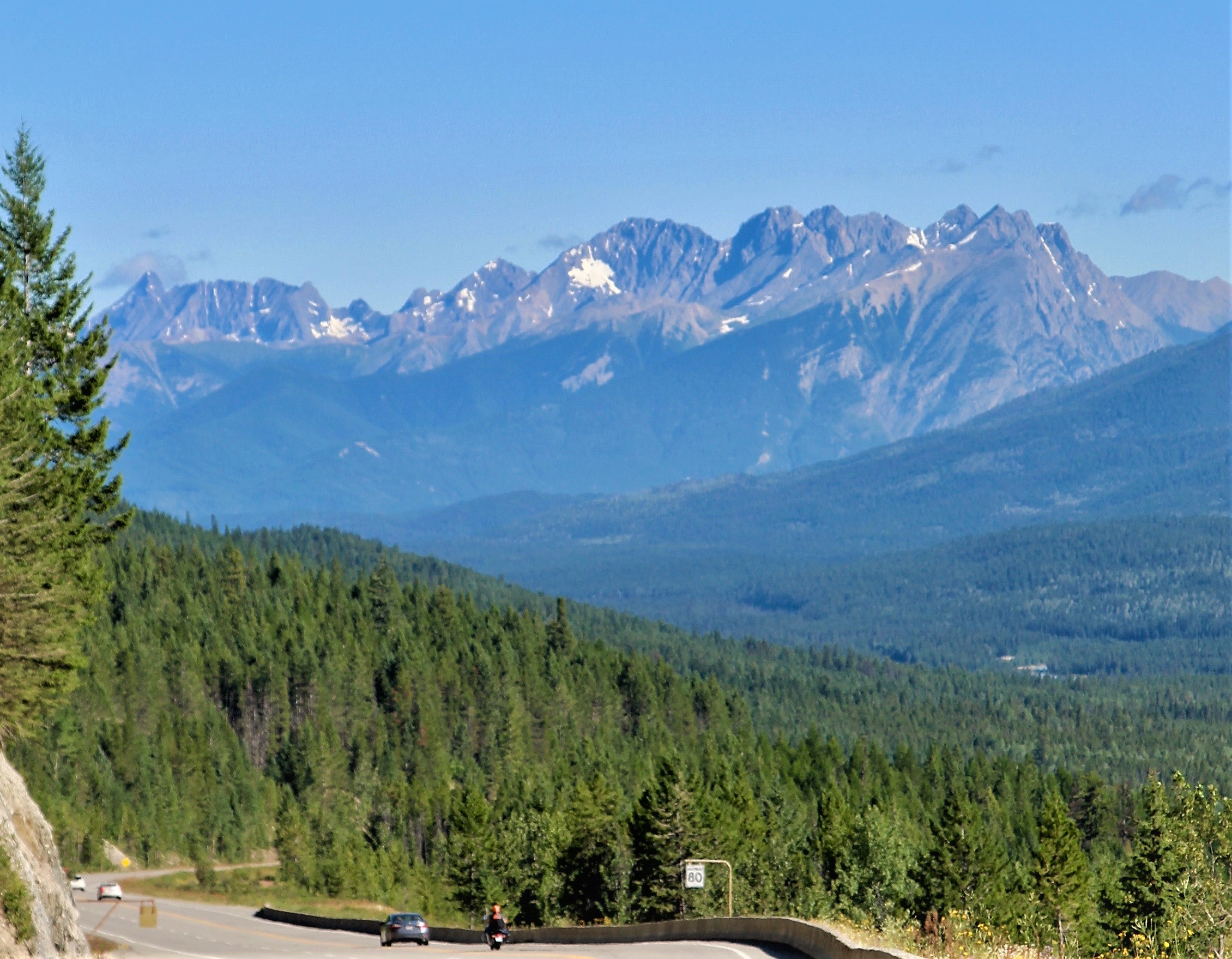
Distant view looking north at Mt. Verendrye (center)

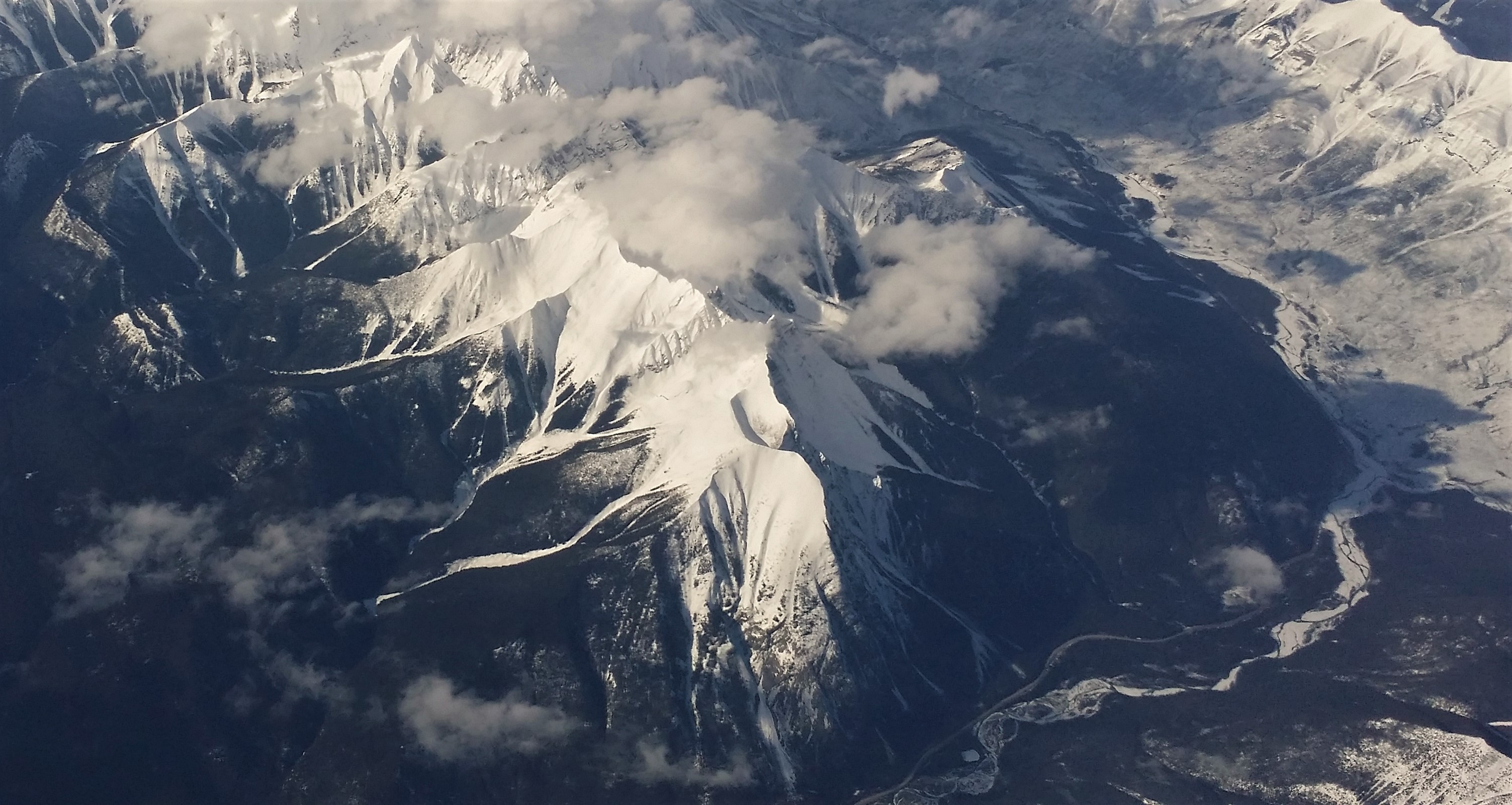
Aerial view of Mt. Wardle (centered), Mt. Verendrye (top, left) and Vermilion River (right)

== See also ==
- Geography of British Columbia
