= Tumbling Peak =

Mountain in Kootenay NP, British Columbia, Canada

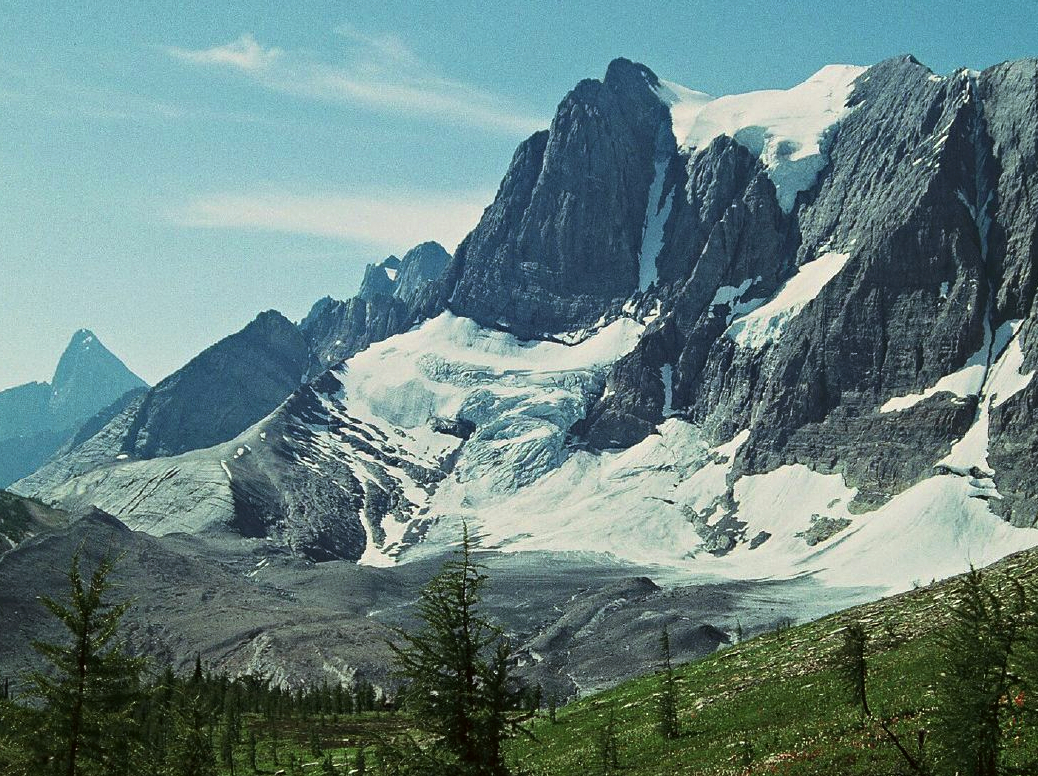
- Tumbling Peak and Tumbling Glacier seen from the Rockwall Trail

Highest point
- Elevation: 3,145 m (10,318 ft)
- Prominence: 685 m (2,247 ft)
- Parent peak: Foster Peak (3,145 m)
- Listing: Mountains of British Columbia
- Coordinates: 51°06′34″N 116°13′57″W

Geography
- Location within British Columbia Location within Canada
- Interactive map of Tumbling Peak
- Country: Canada
- Province: British Columbia
- Protected area: Kootenay National Park
- Parent range: Vermilion Range; Canadian Rockies
- Topo map: NTS 82N1 Mount Goodsir

Geology
- Rock age: Cambrian
- Rock type: Ottertail Limestone

Tumbling Peak is a 3,145-metre (10,318-foot) mountain summit located on the western border of Kootenay National Park in the Vermilion Range, which is a sub-range of the Canadian Rockies of British Columbia, Canada. The mountain takes its name from the Tumbling Glacier located on its northeast flank. Its nearest higher peak is Foster Peak, 6.8 km (4.2 mi) to the southeast. Hewitt Peak is also to the southeast, and Mount Gray is to the immediate northwest. The mountain is situated in an area known as the Rockwall, which is an escarpment of the Vermilion Range. The Rockwall Trail is a scenic 55 kilometers (34 miles) traverse of alpine passes, sub-alpine meadows, hanging glaciers, and limestone cliffs, in some places in excess of 900 meters (2953 feet) above the trail.

== Geology ==
Tumbling Peak is composed of Ottertail limestone, a sedimentary rock laid down during the Precambrian to Jurassic periods and pushed east and over the top of younger rock during the Laramide orogeny.

== Climate ==
Based on the Köppen climate classification, Tumbling Peak is located in a subarctic climate zone with cold, snowy winters, and mild summers. Winter temperatures can drop below −20 °C with wind chill factors below −30 °C. Precipitation runoff from the mountain drains east into tributaries of the Vermilion River, or west into headwaters of the Kootenay River.

== Gallery ==
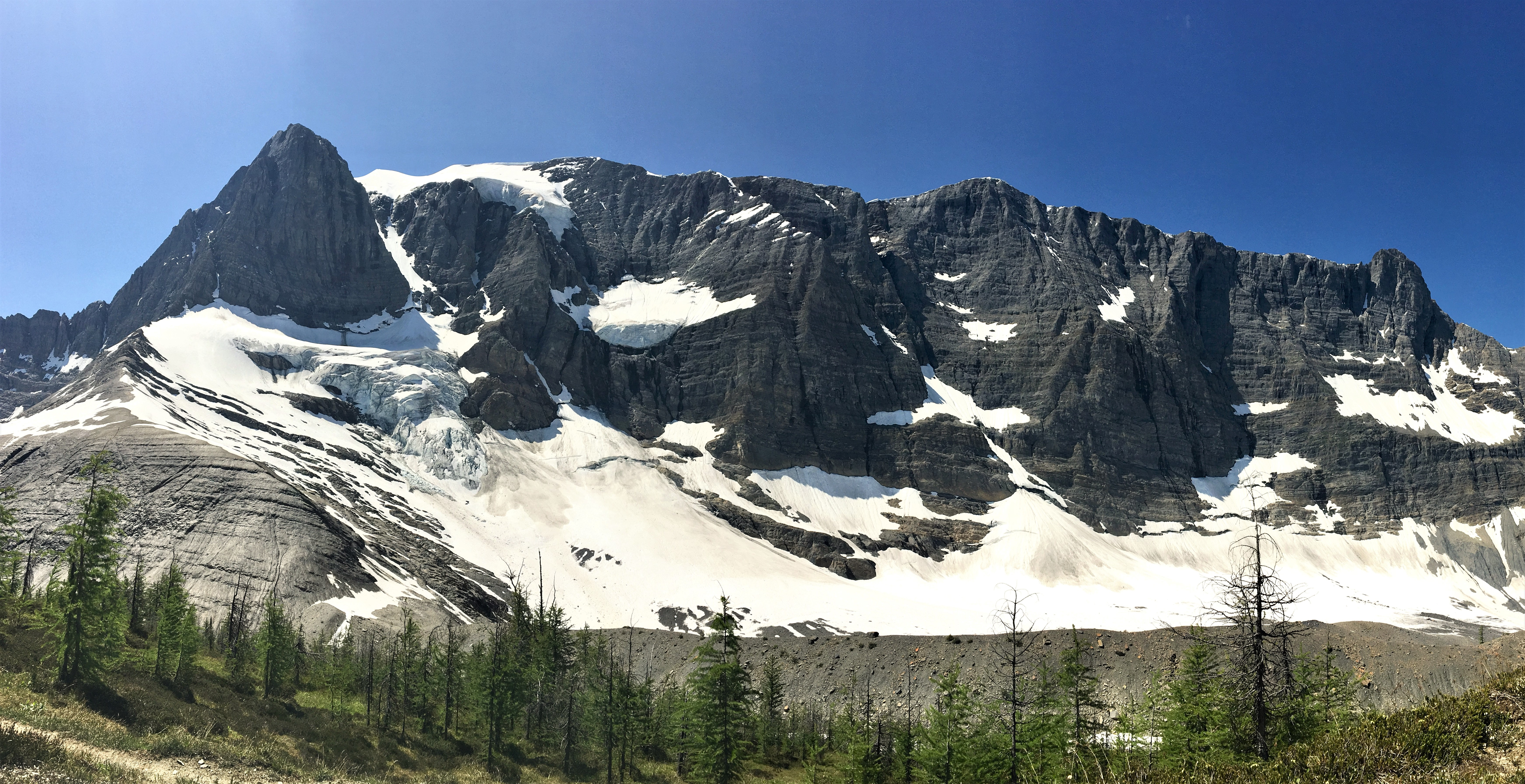
Northeast aspect

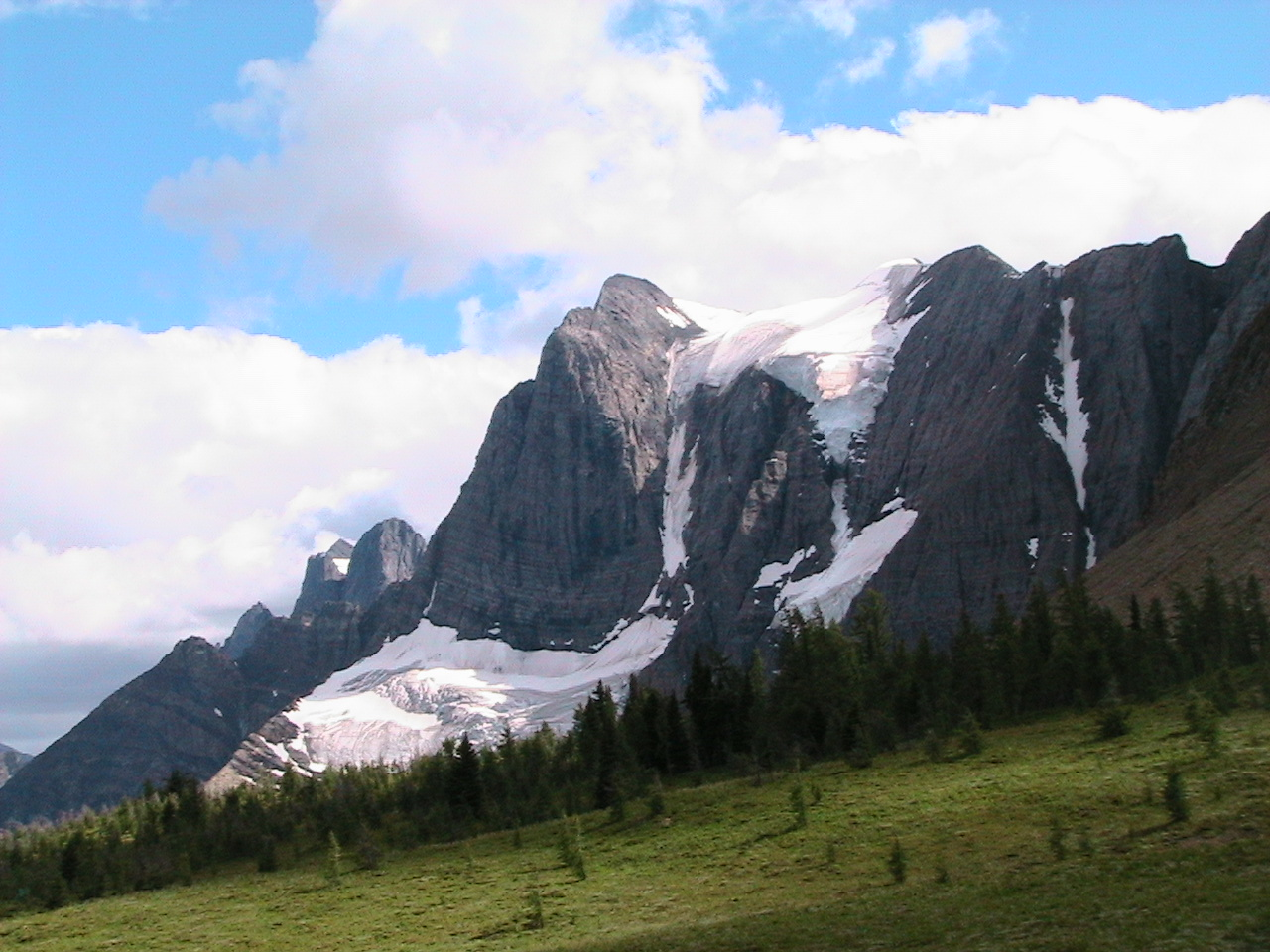
Tumbling Peak seen from the north along the Rockwall Trail

== See also ==
- Geography of British Columbia
- Geology of the Rocky Mountains
