= Mount Wardle =

Mountain in the country of Canada

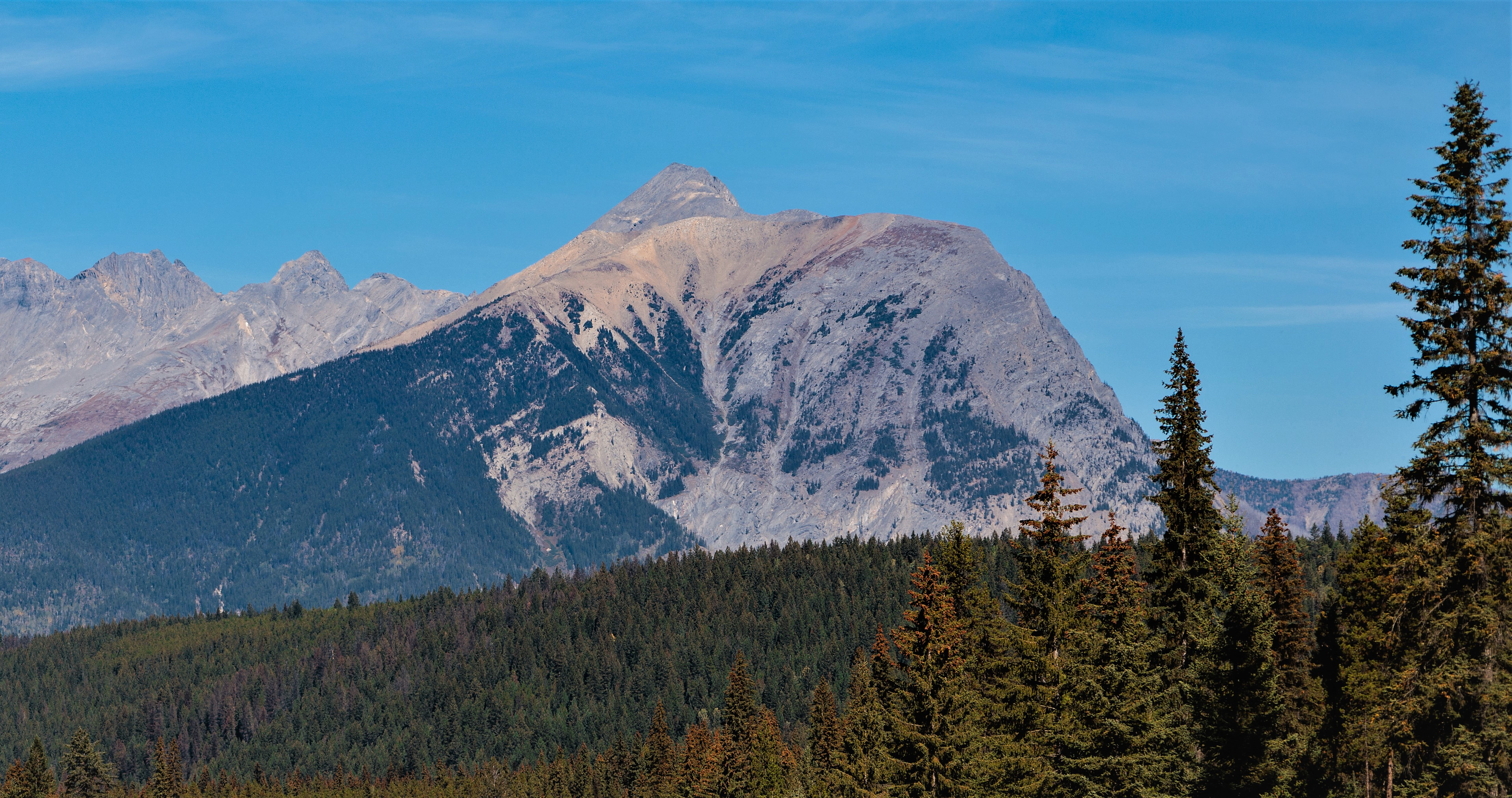
- South aspect

Highest point
- Elevation: 2,805 m (9,203 ft)
- Prominence: 362 m (1,188 ft)
- Parent peak: Mount Verendrye (3,085 m)
- Isolation: 2.61 km (1.62 mi)
- Listing: Mountains of British Columbia
- Coordinates: 50°57′33″N 116°01′12″W

Geography
- Location within British Columbia Location within Canada
- Interactive map of Mount Wardle
- Location: Kootenay National Park; British Columbia, Canada
- District: Kootenay Land District
- Parent range: Vermilion Range; Canadian Rockies
- Topo map: NTS 82K16 Spillimacheen

Geology
- Rock age: Cambrian
- Rock type: Ottertail Limestone

Climbing
- First ascent: 1922

Mount Wardle is a 2,805-metre (9,203-foot) mountain summit located in British Columbia, Canada.

== Description ==
Mount Wardle is situated in Kootenay National Park at the southern end of the Vermilion Range, which is a sub-range of the Canadian Rockies. Mount Wardle is home to the largest population of mountain goats within the national park. Topographic relief is significant as the summit rises 1,600 meters (5,250 feet) above the Banff–Windermere Highway in three kilometers (1.9 mile). Mount Wardle is composed of Ottertail limestone, a sedimentary rock laid down during the Cambrian period and pushed east and over the top of younger rock during the Laramide orogeny. Precipitation runoff from the mountain drains east into Wardle Creek which is a tributary of the Vermilion River, and west into Lost Creek, a tributary of the Kootenay River.

== History ==
The first ascent of the summit was made in 1922 by a Topographical Survey party. The mountain's toponym was applied by Morrison P. Bridgland (1878–1948), a Dominion Land Surveyor who named many peaks in the Canadian Rockies. It was officially adopted 9 September 1924 by the Geographical Names Board of Canada to honor James Morey Wardle (1888–1971), a highway design engineer and then-director of special projects for Parks Canada. Wardle also served as superintendent of Banff National Park from 1919 through 1921.

== Climate ==
Based on the Köppen climate classification, Mount Wardle is located in a subarctic climate zone with cold, snowy winters, and mild summers. Winter temperatures can drop below −20 °C with wind chill factors below −30 °C.

== Gallery ==
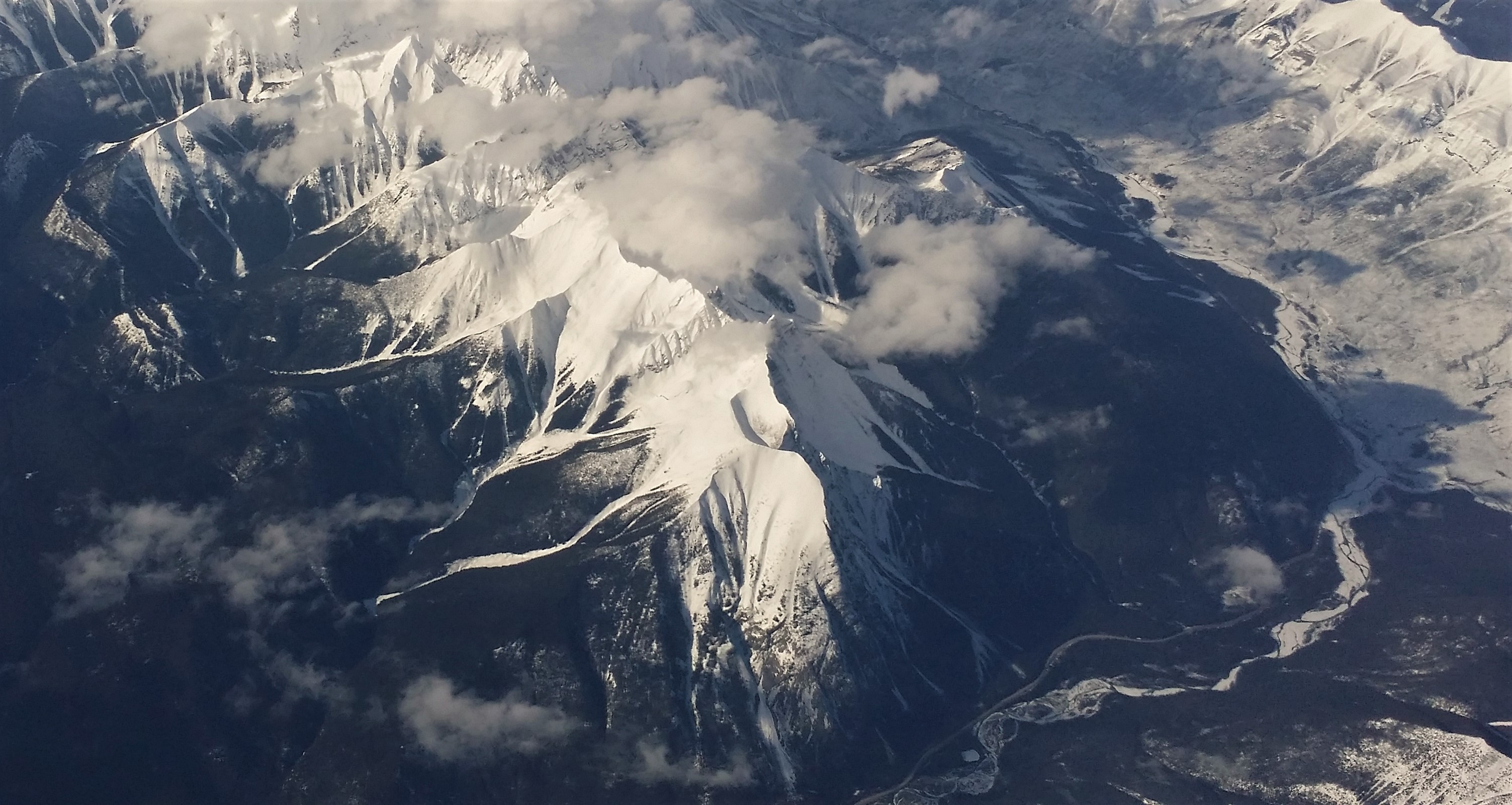
Aerial view of Mt. Wardle (centered), Mt. Verendrye (top, left) and Vermilion River (right)

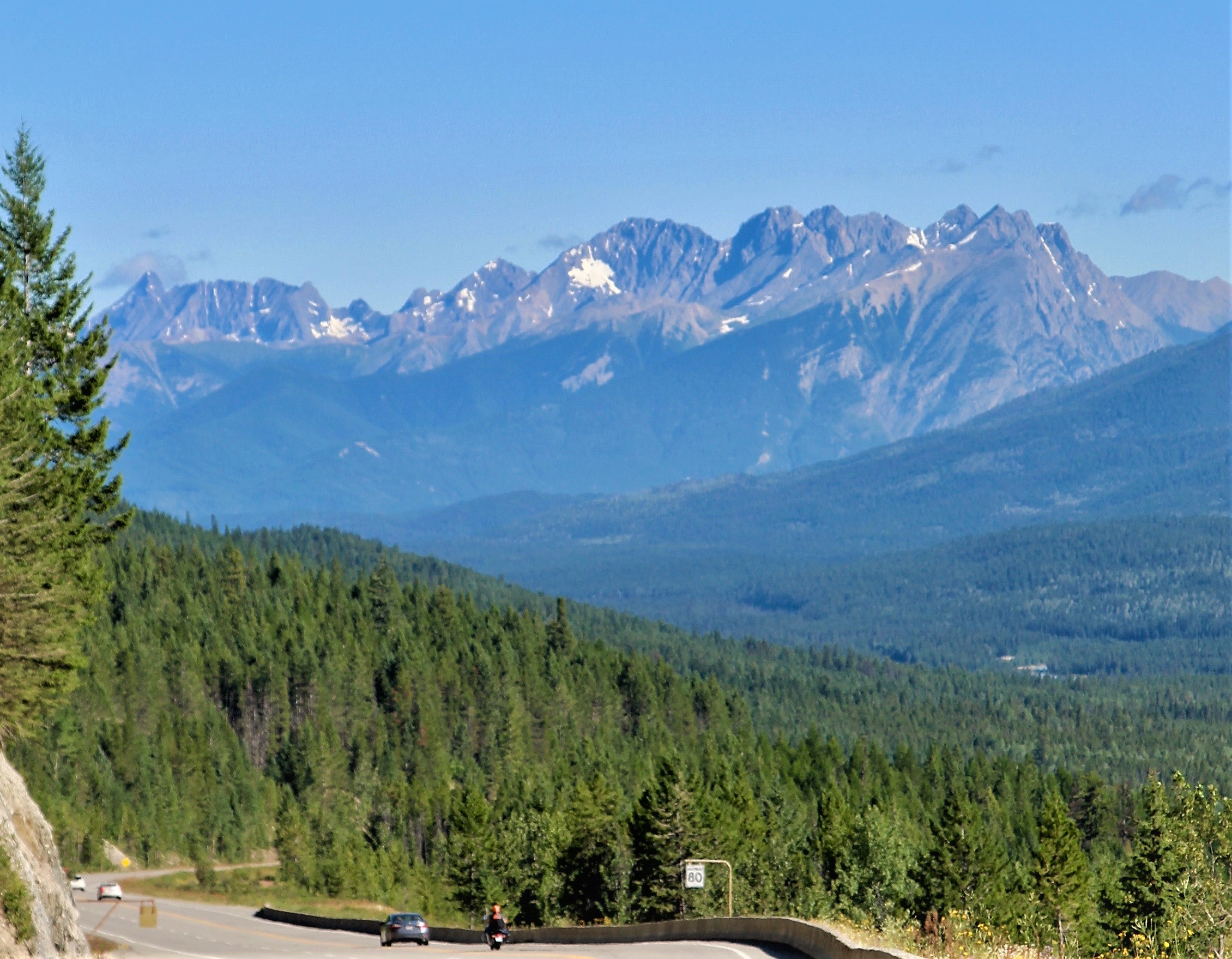
Distant view looking north at Mt. Verendrye (center) and Mt. Wardle (right)

== See also ==
- Geography of British Columbia
