= Floe Peak =

Mountain in British Columbia, Canada

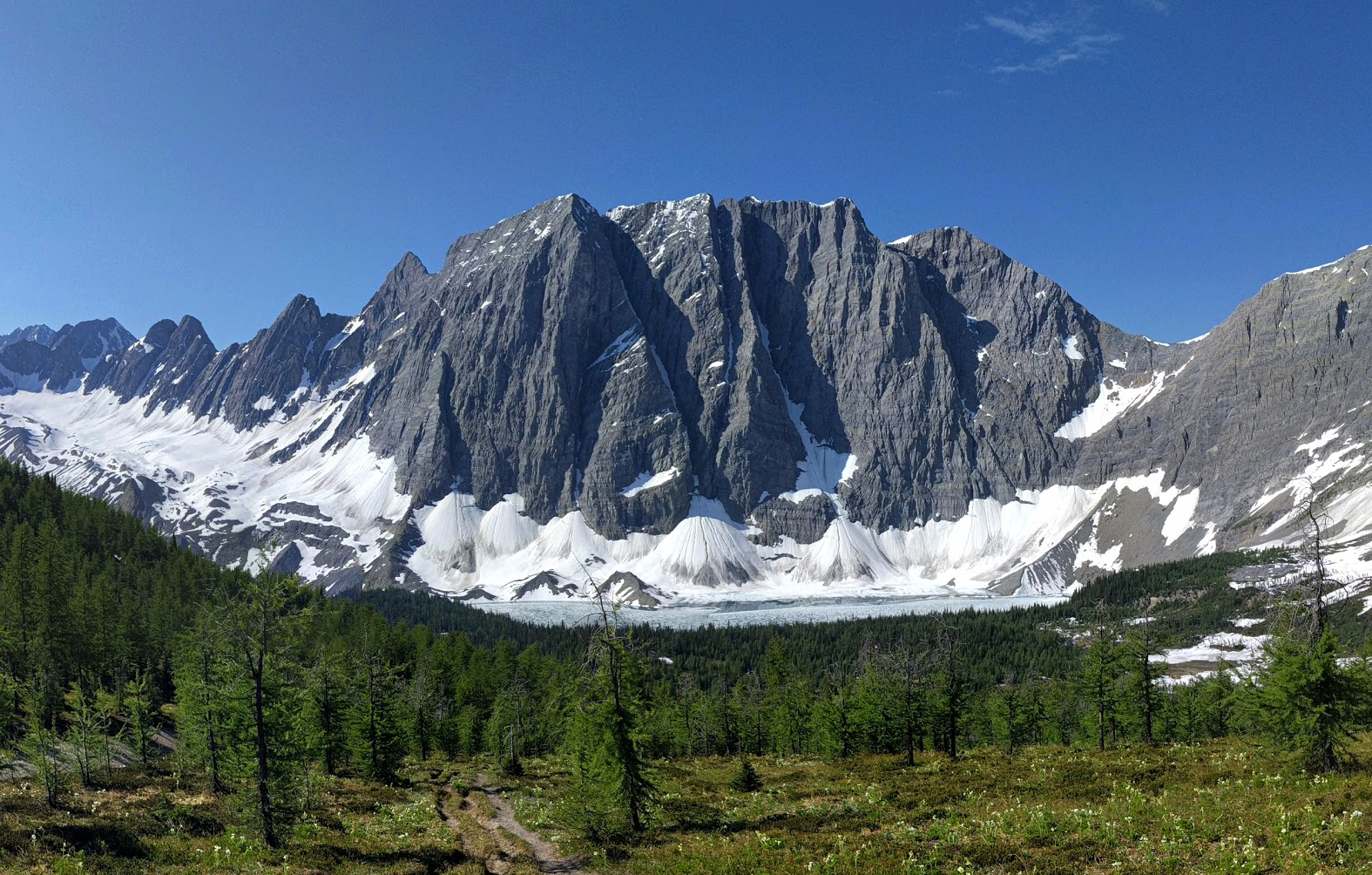
- Floe Peak

Highest point
- Elevation: 3,006 m (9,862 ft)
- Prominence: 436 m (1,430 ft)
- Parent peak: Mount Verendrye (3083 m)
- Listing: Mountains of British Columbia
- Coordinates: 51°02′33″N 116°08′32″W

Geography
- Location within British Columbia Location within Canada
- Interactive map of Floe Peak
- Country: Canada
- Province: British Columbia
- Protected area: Kootenay National Park
- District: Kootenay Land District
- Parent range: Vermilion Range; Canadian Rockies
- Topo map: NTS 82N1 Mount Goodsir

Geology
- Rock age: Cambrian
- Rock type: Ottertail Limestone

Floe Peak is a 3,006-metre (9,862 ft) mountain summit located on the western border of Kootenay National Park, in the Canadian Rockies of British Columbia, Canada. The name for this mountain has not been officially adopted yet. Its nearest higher peak is Foster Peak, 3.0 km (1.9 mi) to the northwest, and both are part of the Vermilion Range. The mountain is part of what is known as the Rockwall in the Vermilion Range, and is named for Floe Lake which is situated below the enormous northern cliffs of the peak. Floe Lake, one of the beauty spots of Kootenay Park, is accessible via the Floe Lake Trail.

== Geology ==
Floe Peak is composed of limestone, a sedimentary rock laid down during the Precambrian to Jurassic periods and pushed east and over the top of younger rock during the Laramide orogeny.

== Climate ==
Based on the Köppen climate classification, Floe Peak is located in a subarctic climate with cold, snowy winters, and mild summers. Temperatures can drop below −20 °C with wind chill factors below −30 °C. Precipitation runoff from the mountain drains east into Floe Creek, a tributary of the Vermilion River, or west into tributaries of the Kootenay River.

== Gallery ==
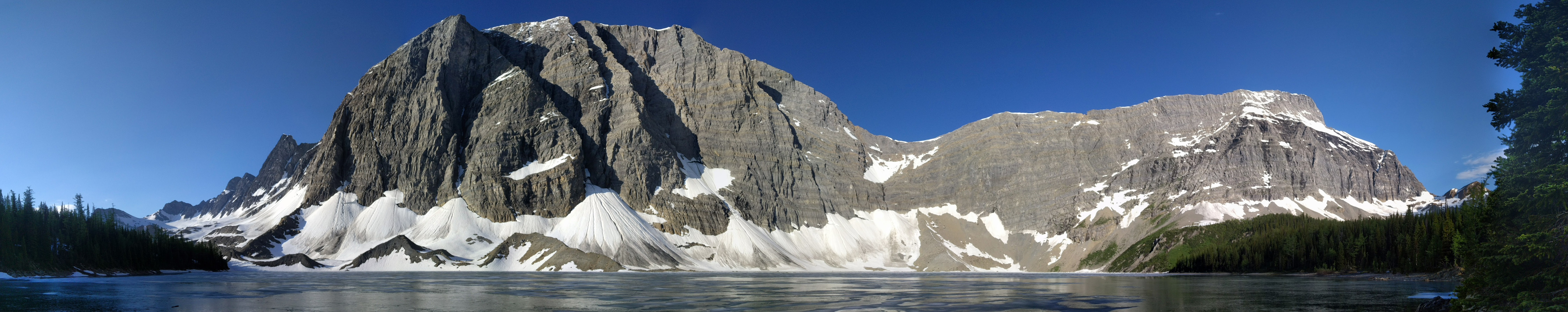
Floe Peak from Floe Lake

== See also ==
- Geology of the Rocky Mountains
- Geography of British Columbia
