= Hewitt Peak =

Mountain summit in Canada

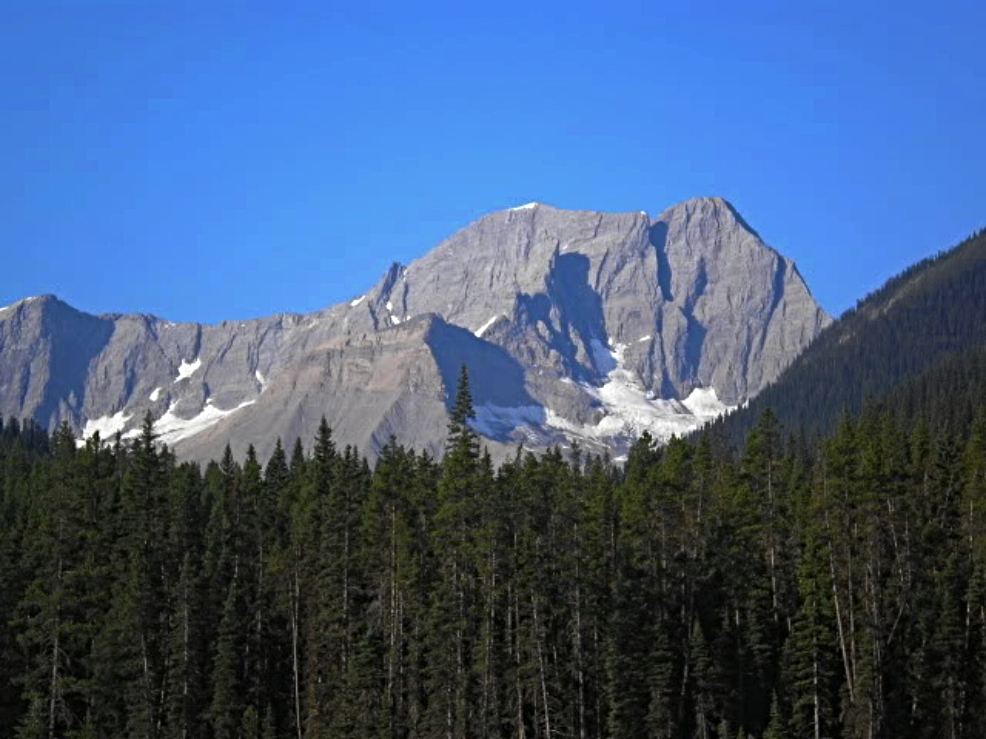
- Hewitt Peak seen from Highway 93

Highest point
- Elevation: 3,066 m (10,059 ft)
- Prominence: 548 m (1,798 ft)
- Parent peak: Tumbling Peak (3121 m)
- Listing: Mountains of British Columbia
- Coordinates: 51°05′32″N 116°12′42″W

Geography
- Location within British Columbia Location within Canada
- Interactive map of Hewitt Peak
- Location: Kootenay National Park; British Columbia, Canada
- Parent range: Vermilion Range; Canadian Rockies
- Topo map: NTS 82N1 Mount Goodsir

Geology
- Rock age: Cambrian
- Rock type: Limestone

Climbing
- First ascent: 1906, Dominion Land Survey
- Easiest route: Scrambling

Hewitt Peak is a 3,066-metre (10,059 ft) mountain summit located on the western border of Kootenay National Park, in the Canadian Rockies of British Columbia, Canada. The peak is also known locally as Mammoth Peak, and originally as Mount 10060. The alternate names derive from its outline profile resembling a mammoth, and its elevation as measured in feet. No name for this mountain has been officially adopted yet. Its nearest higher peak is Tumbling Peak, 2.5 km (1.6 mi) to the north-northwest, and both are part of the Vermilion Range. Park visitors can catch a glimpse of the peak from Highway 93, also known as the Banff–Windermere Highway.

== History ==
The first ascent of the mountain was made in 1906 by members of the Dominion Land Survey. It was first named Mount 10060 by Kate Gardiner and party in 1933, when they climbed nearby Foster Peak and Mount 10240 (now known as Tumbling Peak). Hewitt Peak may be named for Hewitt Bostock, Martin Hewitt or James J. Hewitt.

== Geology ==
Hewitt Peak is composed of limestone, a sedimentary rock laid down during the Precambrian to Jurassic periods. Formed in shallow seas, this sedimentary rock was pushed east and over the top of younger rock during the Laramide orogeny.

== Climate ==
Based on the Köppen climate classification, Hewitt Peak is located in a subarctic climate zone with cold, snowy winters, and mild summers. Temperatures can drop below −20 °C with wind chill factors below −30 °C. Precipitation runoff from the mountain drains east into Numa Creek, a tributary of the Vermilion River, or west into tributaries of the Kootenay River.

== Gallery ==
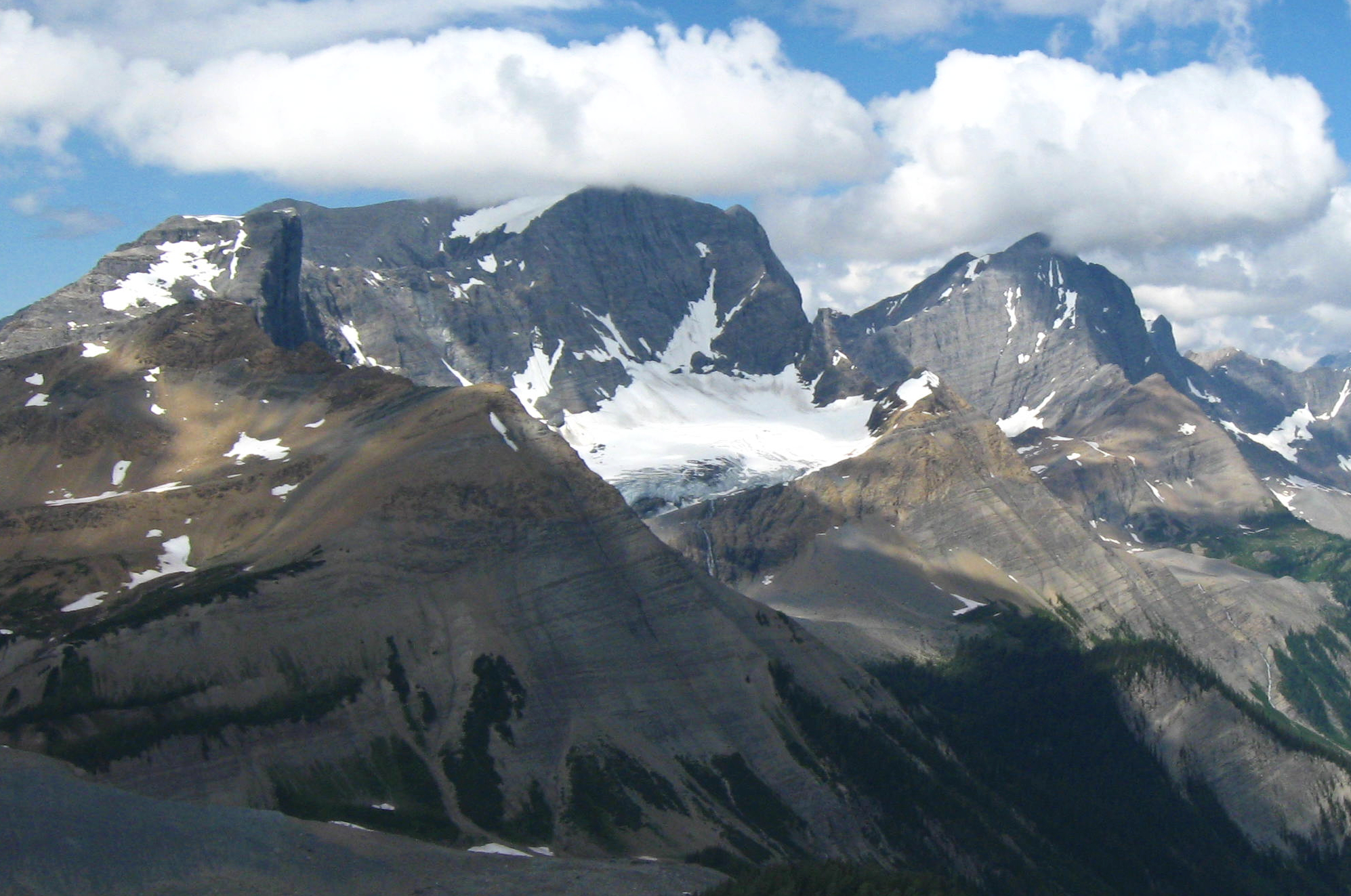
Hewitt Peak (centered) from Numa Mountain

== See also ==
- Geology of the Rocky Mountains
- Geography of British Columbia
