= Vermilion Range (British Columbia) =

Mountain range in British Columbia, Canada

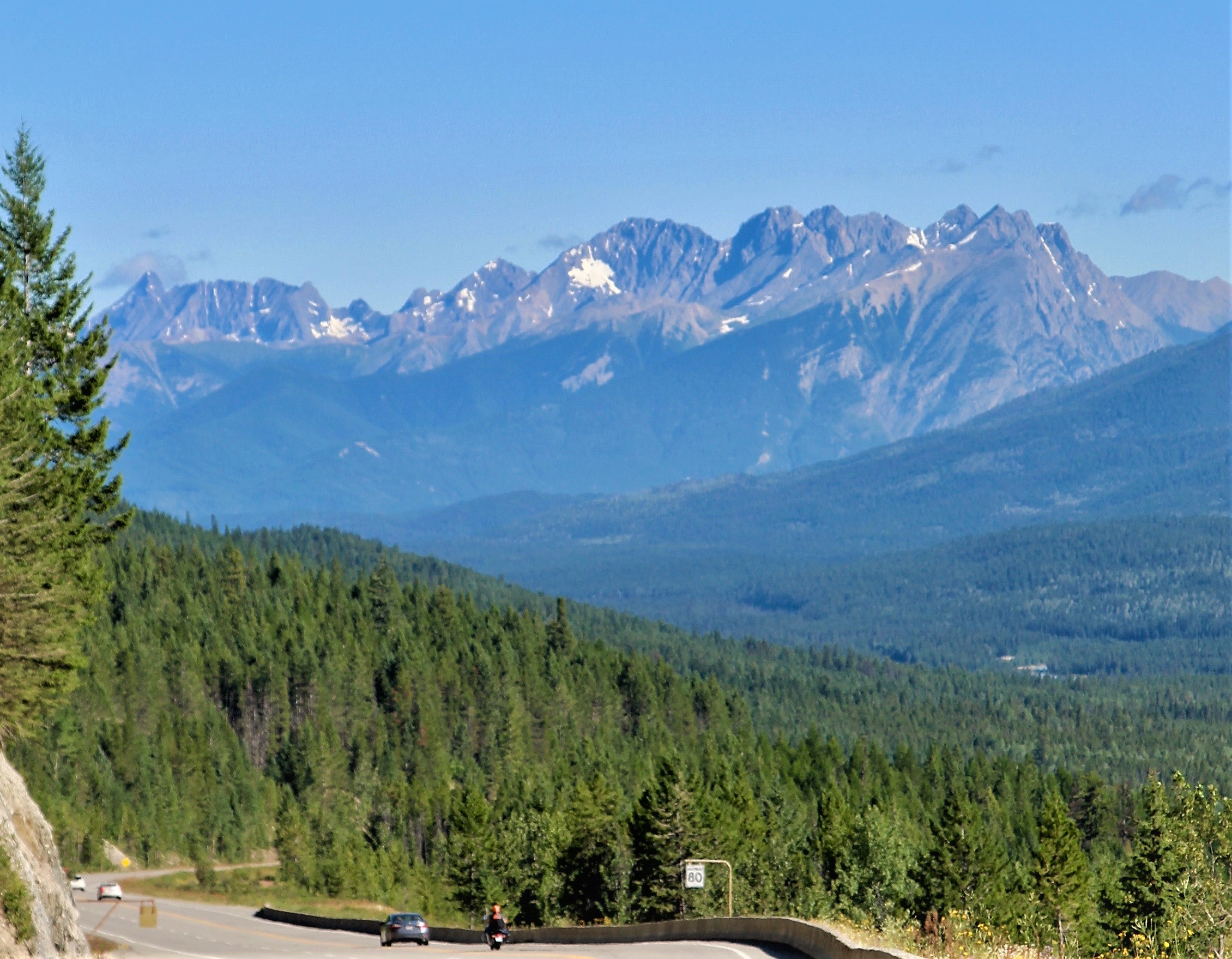
- View from Highway 93 looking north at Mt. Verendrye (center) and Mt. Wardle (right)

Highest point
- Peak: Foster Peak
- Elevation: 3,204 m (10,512 ft)
- Prominence: 996 m (3,268 ft)
- Listing: Mountains of British Columbia
- Coordinates: 51°03′56″N 116°09′51″W

Dimensions
- Length: 46 km (29 mi) N-S
- Width: 33 km (21 mi) E-W
- Area: 568 km^{2} (219 mi^{2})

Geography
- Location within British Columbia
- Country: Canada
- Province: British Columbia
- District: Kootenay Land District
- Range coordinates: 51°05′N 116°05′W
- Parent range: Park Ranges
- Topo map: NTS 82N1 Mount Goodsir

The Vermilion Range is a mountain range of the Canadian Rockies, in British Columbia, Canada. The range is west of the Vermilion River and east of the headwaters of the Kootenay River.

== List of mountains ==
This range includes the following mountains and peaks:

Name	Elevation		Prominence		Coordinates
Name	m	ft	m	ft	Coordinates
Foster Peak	3,204	10,512	996	3,268	51°3′56″N 116°9′51″W
Tumbling Peak	3,145	10,318	685	2,247	51°6′34″N 116°13′57″W
Mount Verendrye	3,085	10,121	515	1,690	51°0′20″N 116°4′31″W
Hewitt Peak	3,066	10,059	548	1,798	51°5′31″N 116°12′39″W
Floe Peak	3,006	9,862	436	1,430	51°2′33″N 116°8′32″W
Mount Drysdale	2,932	9,619	162	531	51°9′0.0″N 116°16′22.8″W
Mount Gray	2,886	9,469	136	446	51°7′46″N 116°15′47″W
Limestone Peak	2,878	9,442	51	167	51°11′0″N 116°17′53″W
Mount Wardle	2,805	9,203	362	1,188	50°57′33″N 116°1′12″W
Numa Mountain	2,721	8,927	391	1,283	

== See also ==
- Geography of British Columbia
