= Mount Gray (Vermilion Range) =

Mountain in Kootenay NP, British Columbia, Canada

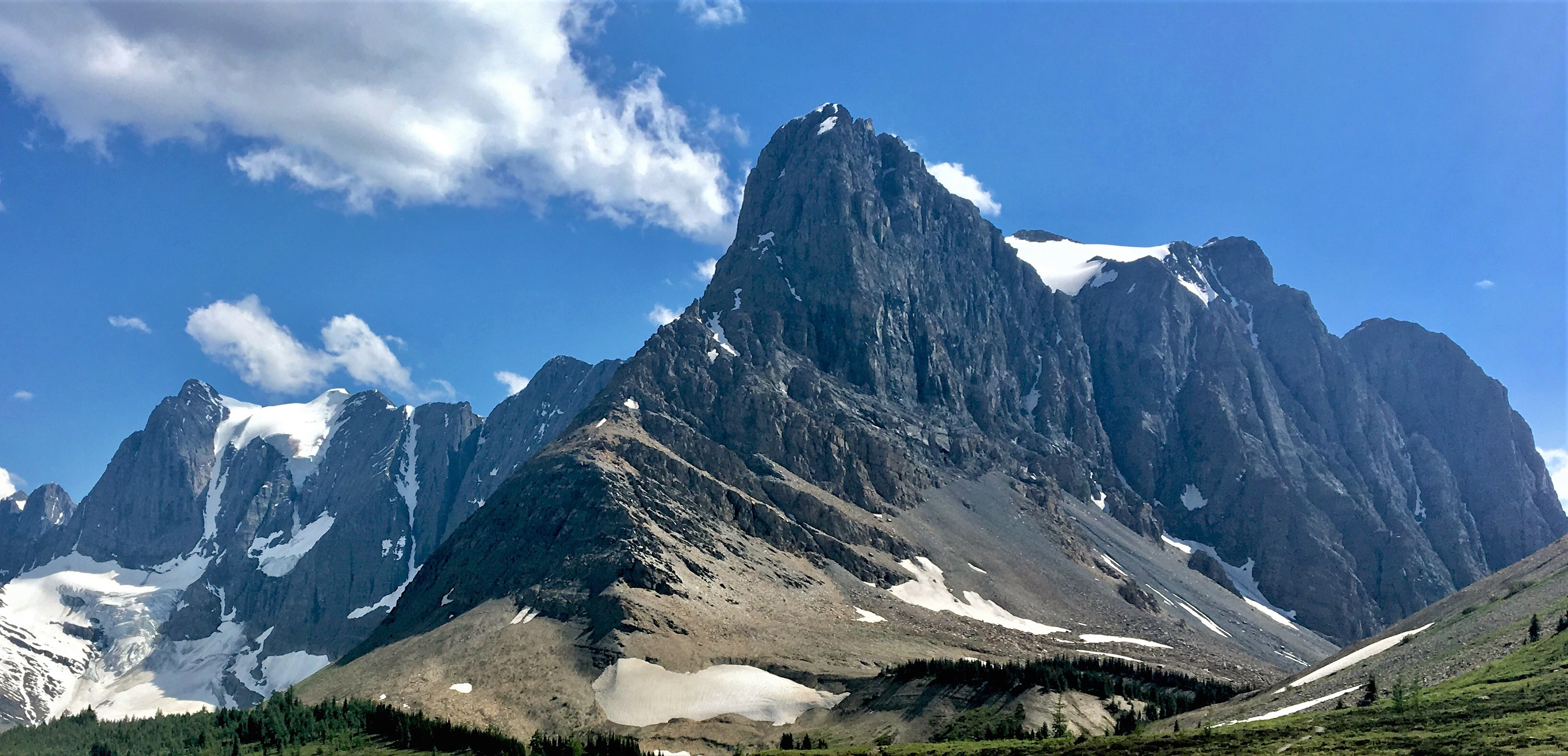
- Mount Gray seen from Rockwall Pass

Highest point
- Elevation: 2,886 m (9,469 ft)
- Prominence: 136 m (446 ft)
- Parent peak: Tumbling Peak (3145 m)
- Listing: Mountains of British Columbia
- Coordinates: 51°07′46″N 116°15′47″W

Geography
- Location within British Columbia Location within Canada
- Interactive map of Mount Gray
- Location: Kootenay National Park; British Columbia, Canada
- District: Kootenay Land District
- Parent range: Vermilion Range; Canadian Rockies
- Topo map: NTS 82N1 Mount Goodsir

Geology
- Rock age: Cambrian
- Rock type: Ottertail Limestone

Mount Gray is a 2,886-metre (9,469-foot) mountain summit located on the western border of Kootenay National Park in the Vermilion Range, which is a sub-range of the Canadian Rockies in British Columbia, Canada. Its nearest higher peak is Tumbling Peak, 3.1 km (1.9 mi) to the southeast. The mountain is part of what is known as the Rockwall which is an escarpment of the Vermilion Range. The Rockwall Trail is a scenic 55 kilometre (34 mile) traverse of alpine passes, subalpine meadows, hanging glaciers, and limestone cliffs, in some places in excess of 900 m (2,953 ft) above the trail.

== Geology ==
Mount Gray is composed of Ottertail limestone, a sedimentary rock laid down during the Cambrian period and pushed east and over the top of younger rock during the Laramide orogeny.

== History ==
"Mount Cambria" or "Cambria Peak" were names originally proposed in 1918 for the mountain by Charles Doolittle Walcott because it was formed entirely of Cambrian rocks. However, the mountain's name was officially adopted in 1924 by the Geographical Names Board of Canada to honor William J. Gray, a University of British Columbia student and founding member of the British Columbia Mountaineering Club who drowned in the Kootenay River on July 10, 1917, along with Charles Wales Drysdale when their raft capsized and both were swept away while working on a geologic field survey. Mount Drysdale and Mount Gray form the buttresses on opposite sides of Wolverine Pass.

== Climate ==
Based on the Köppen climate classification, Mount Gray is located in a subarctic climate zone with cold, snowy winters, and mild summers. Temperatures can drop below −20 °C with wind chill factors below −30 °C. Precipitation runoff from the mountain drains east into tributaries of the Vermilion River, or west into tributaries of the Beaverfoot River.

== Gallery ==
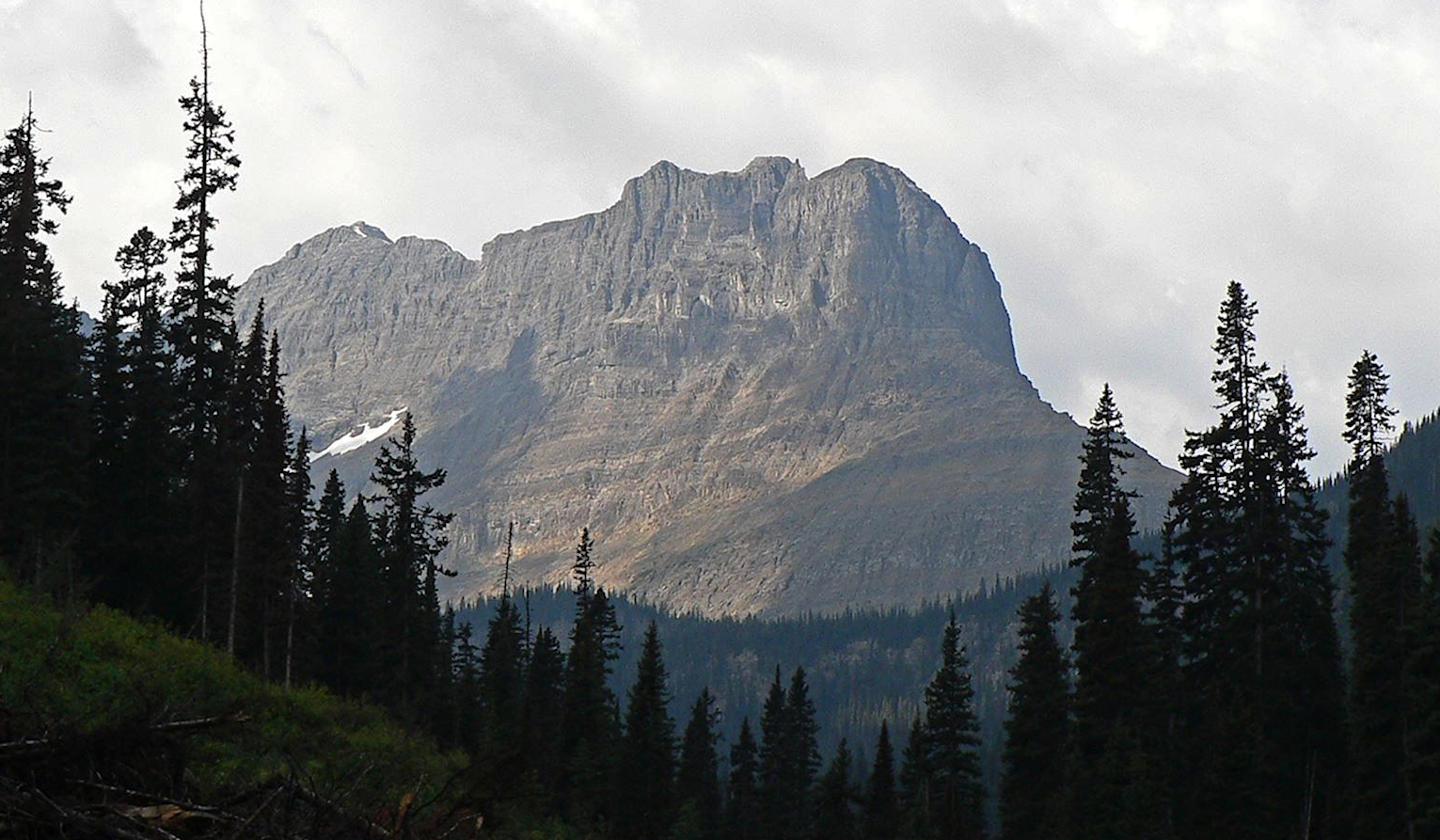
Mount Gray seen from Tumbling Creek Trail
