= 10060 =

10060 may refer to:

== Places ==
- Mount 10060, former name of the Canadian Rockies mountain Hewitt Peak
- Municipality 10060, the geographic code for Saint-Valérien, Quebec
- 10060 Amymilne, the asteroid #10060 named "Amymilne"

== Other uses ==
- Former customer service number for China Netcom
