= Helmet Falls =

Waterfalls on Helmet Creek in Kootenay National Park, British Columbia, Canada

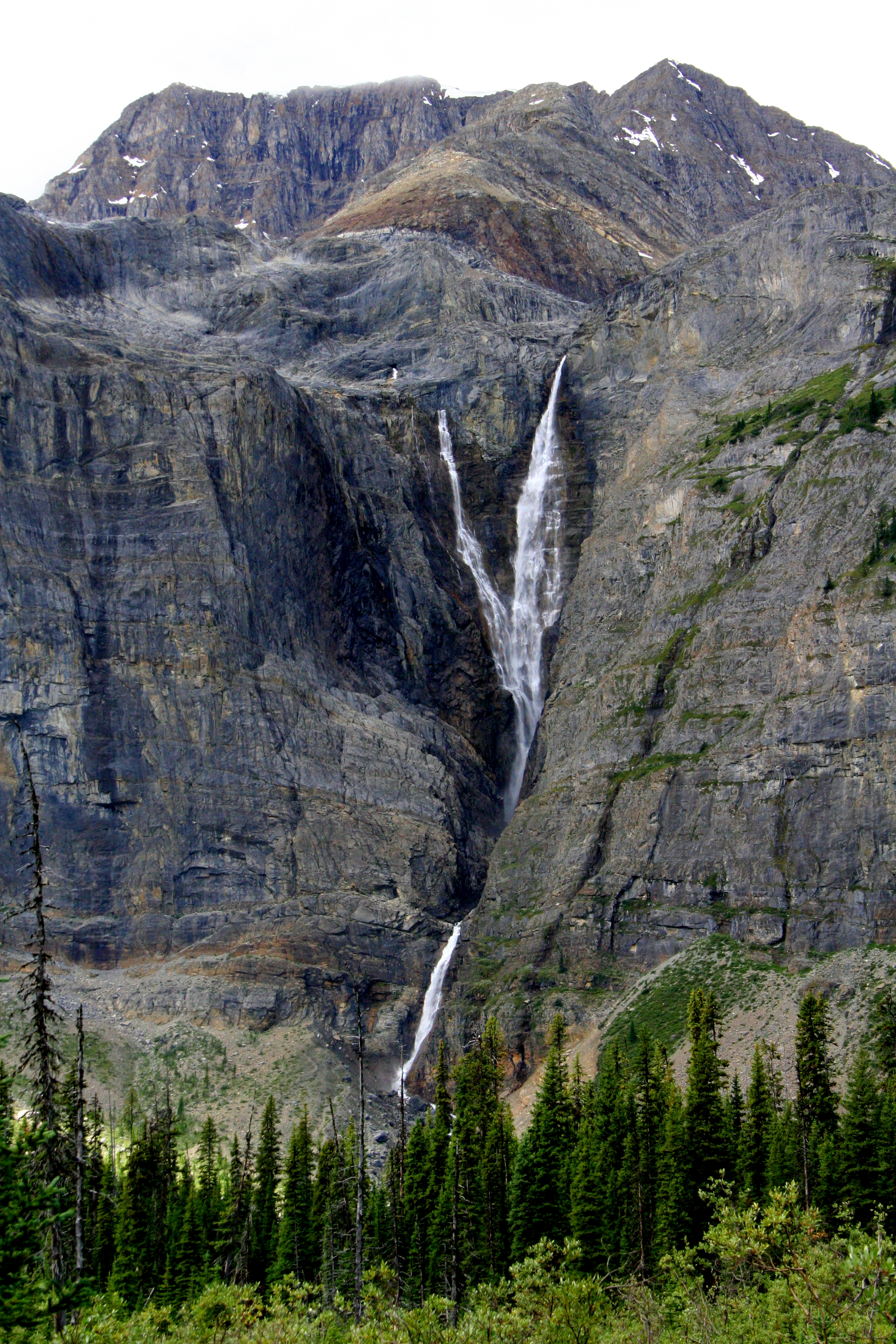
- Helmet Falls viewed from Rockwall Trail

- Location within British Columbia
- Location: Kootenay National Park, British Columbia, Canada
- Coordinates: 51°11′13″N 116°19′23″W
- Type: Tiered horsetails
- Total height: 352 metres (1,155 ft)
- Number of drops: 3
- Longest drop: 250–300 metres (820–980 ft)
- Total width: 91 metres (299 ft)
- Average width: 30 metres (98 ft)
- Run: 244 metres (801 ft)
- Watercourse: Helmet Creek
- Average flow rate: 1 m^{3}/s (35 cu ft/s)

Helmet Falls is a tiered waterfall located in Kootenay National Park in British Columbia, Canada. With total height of 352 metres (1,155 ft), Helmet Falls is the 11th tallest confirmed waterfall in the Canadian Rockies, as well as one of the most significant waterfalls in British Columbia based on both height and volume.

== Description ==
The waterfall drops over the edge of a hanging valley situated on the northeast face of Helmet Mountain and descends down the face of a massive amphitheatre-like cliff. The upper tier is largest, plunging between 250–300 metres (820–980 ft) into a narrow gorge where the small middle tier is found. As the creek spills out of the canyon, it plunges another 40–50 metres (130–160 ft) to the valley floor. In addition, resurgent stream spills out of the side of the cliff and joins the upper fall from the east.

The waterfall is fed by Helmet Creek, which itself is formed from the meltwater of West Washmawapta Glacier located atop the aforementioned hanging valley. The creek is a tributary of Vermilion River.

== Access ==
Helmet Falls is located at the end of a 15 km (9.3 mi), moderately difficult hiking trail. The trailhead is located at the Painted Pots parking lot off Highway 93.

== See also ==
- List of waterfalls
- List of waterfalls in British Columbia
- Numa Falls
