= Mount Drysdale =

Mountain in British Columbia, Canada

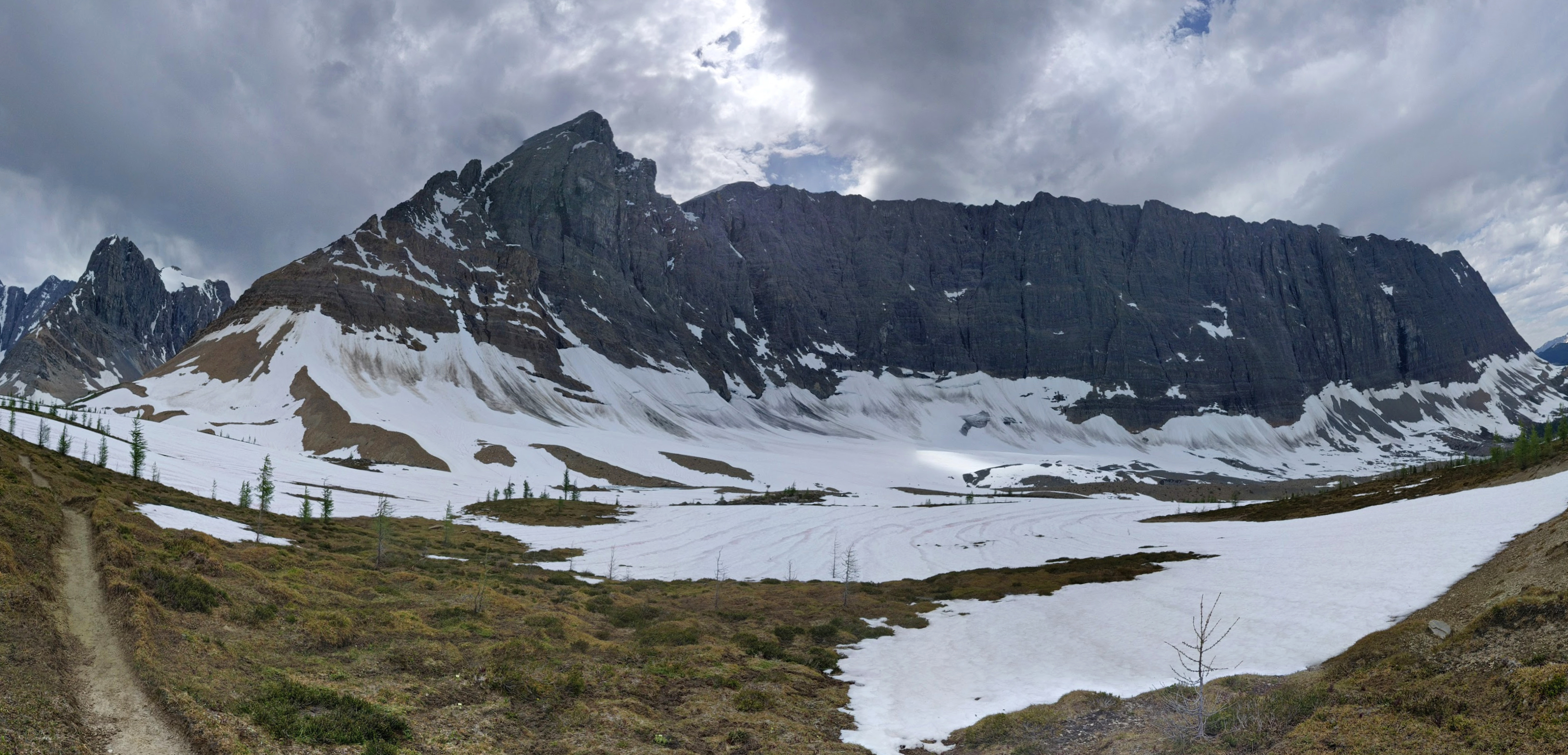
- Mount Drysdale (left of center) with the Rockwall (right) as seen from Rockwall Pass

Highest point
- Elevation: 2,932 m (9,619 ft)
- Prominence: 162 m (531 ft)
- Parent peak: Rockwall Peak (2979 m)
- Listing: Mountains of British Columbia
- Coordinates: 51°09′00″N 116°16′22″W

Geography
- Location within British Columbia Location within Canada
- Interactive map of Mount Drysdale
- Location: Kootenay National Park; British Columbia, Canada
- District: Kootenay Land District
- Parent range: Vermilion Range; Canadian Rockies
- Topo map: NTS 82N1 Mount Goodsir

Geology
- Rock age: Cambrian
- Rock type: Ottertail Limestone

Climbing
- First ascent: John Peck, Dornacilla Peck, (Dornacilla Drysdale), and Dr. Morley Tuttle

Mount Drysdale is a 2,932-metre (9,619-foot) mountain summit located on the western border of Kootenay National Park in the Vermilion Range, which is a sub-range of the Canadian Rockies of British Columbia, Canada. Its nearest higher peak is Rockwall Peak, 1.0 km (0.62 mi) to the west. The mountain is part of what is known as the Rockwall which is an escarpment of the Vermilion Range. The Rockwall Trail is a scenic 55 kilometre (34 mile) traverse of alpine passes, subalpine meadows, hanging glaciers, and limestone cliffs, in some places in excess of 900 m (2,950 ft) above the trail.

== History ==
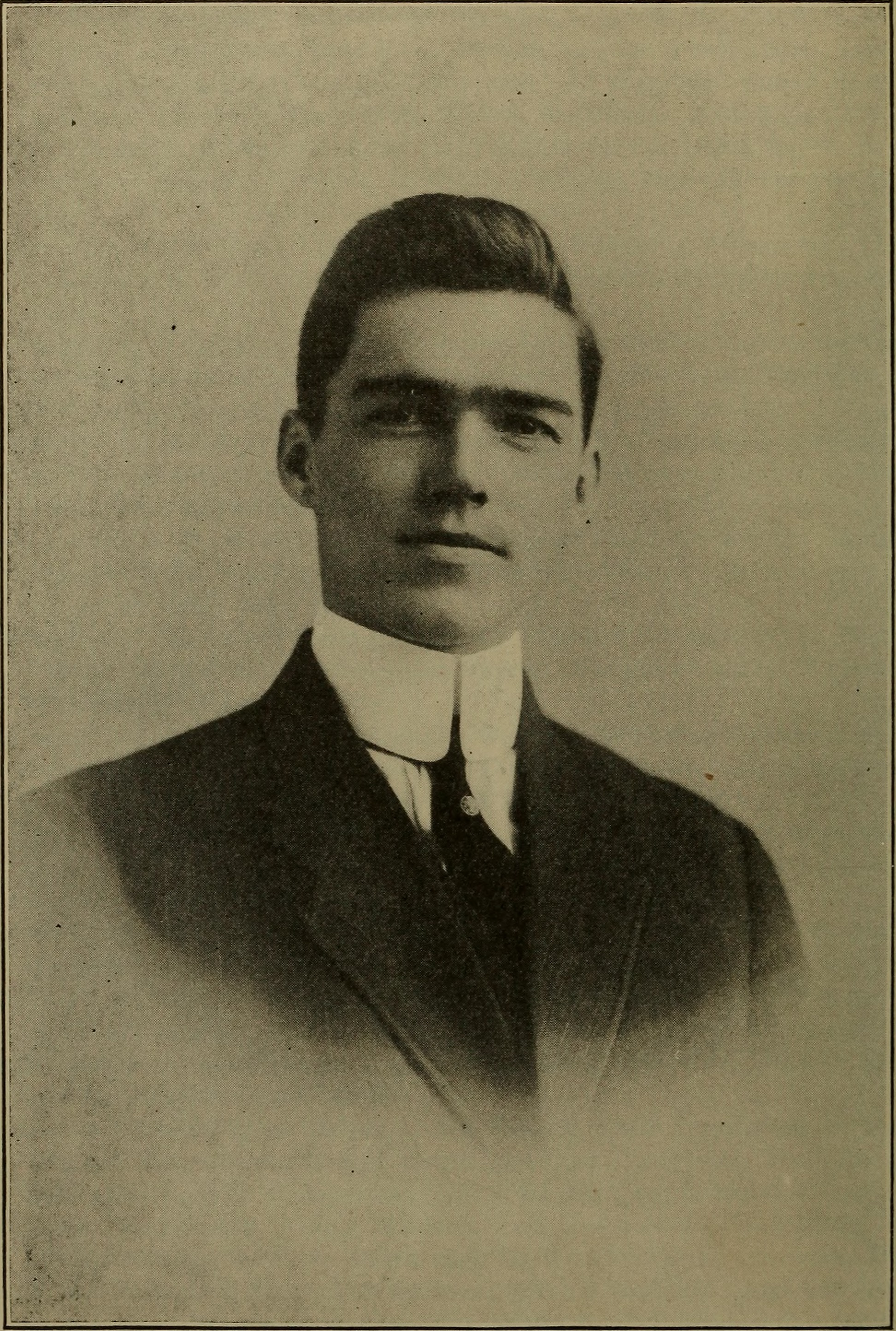
Charles Wales Drysdale

The mountain's name was officially adopted in 1924 by the Geographical Names Board of Canada to honor Charles Wales Drysdale (1885-1917), a member of the Geological Survey of Canada who drowned in the Kootenay River on July 10, 1917, along with his assistant William Gray when their raft capsized and both were swept away while working on a field survey. Mount Drysdale and Mount Gray form the buttresses on either side of Wolverine Pass.

The first ascent of Mount Drysdale was made by John Peck, Dr. Morley Tuttle and Dornacilla Peck (Dornacilla Drysdale), who was Drysdale's eldest daughter.

== Geology ==
Mount Drysdale is composed of Ottertail limestone, a sedimentary rock laid down during the Precambrian to Jurassic periods and pushed east and over the top of younger rock during the Laramide orogeny.

== Climate ==
Based on the Köppen climate classification, Mount Drysdale is located in a subarctic climate zone with cold, snowy winters, and mild summers. Temperatures can drop below −20 °C with wind chill factors below −30 °C. Precipitation runoff from the mountain drains east into tributaries of the Vermilion River, or west into tributaries of the Beaverfoot River.

== Gallery ==
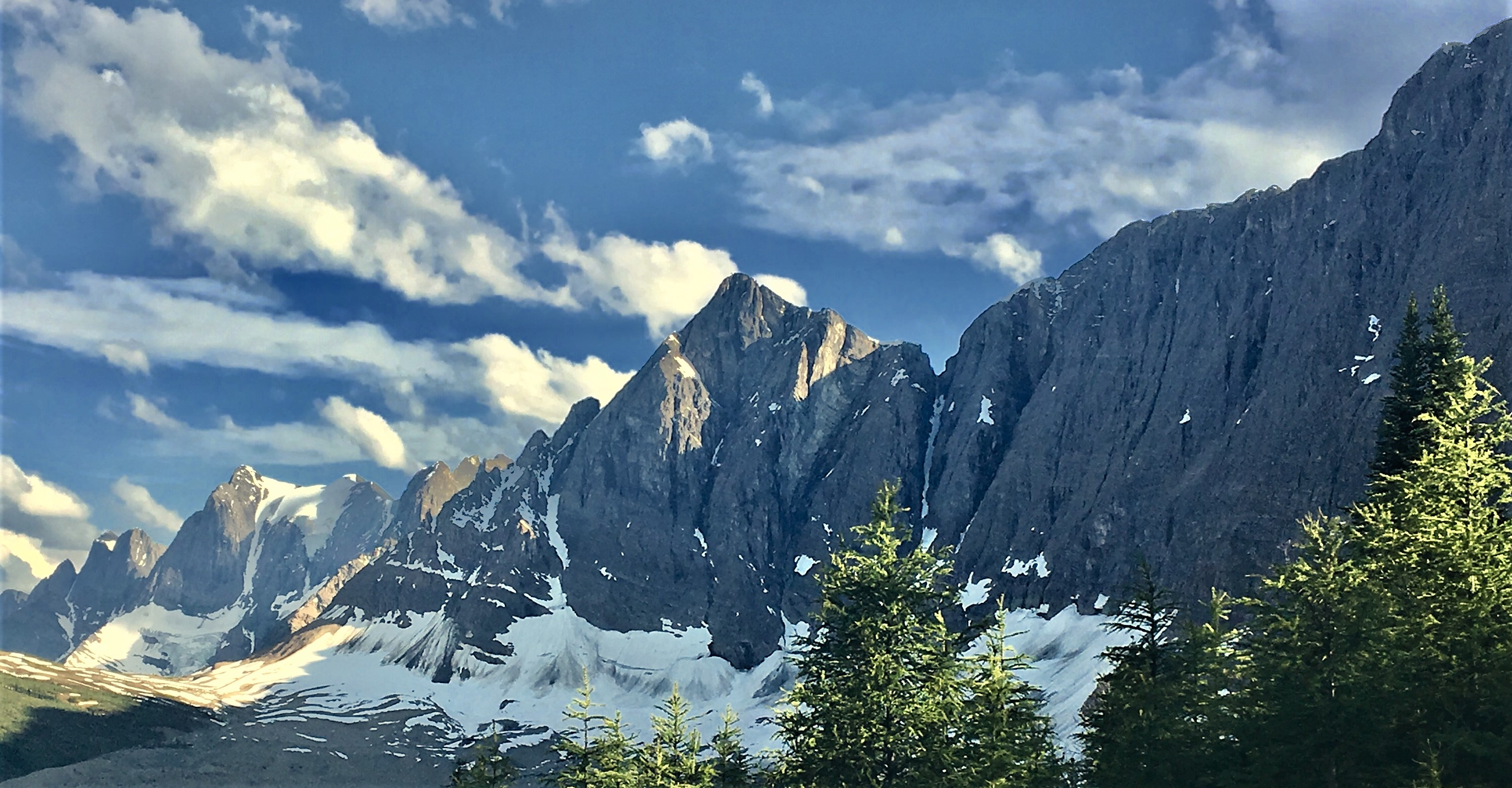
North aspect centered
