= Numa Falls =

Waterfall in Kootenay National Park, Canada

Coordinates: 51.132362°N 116.131973°W

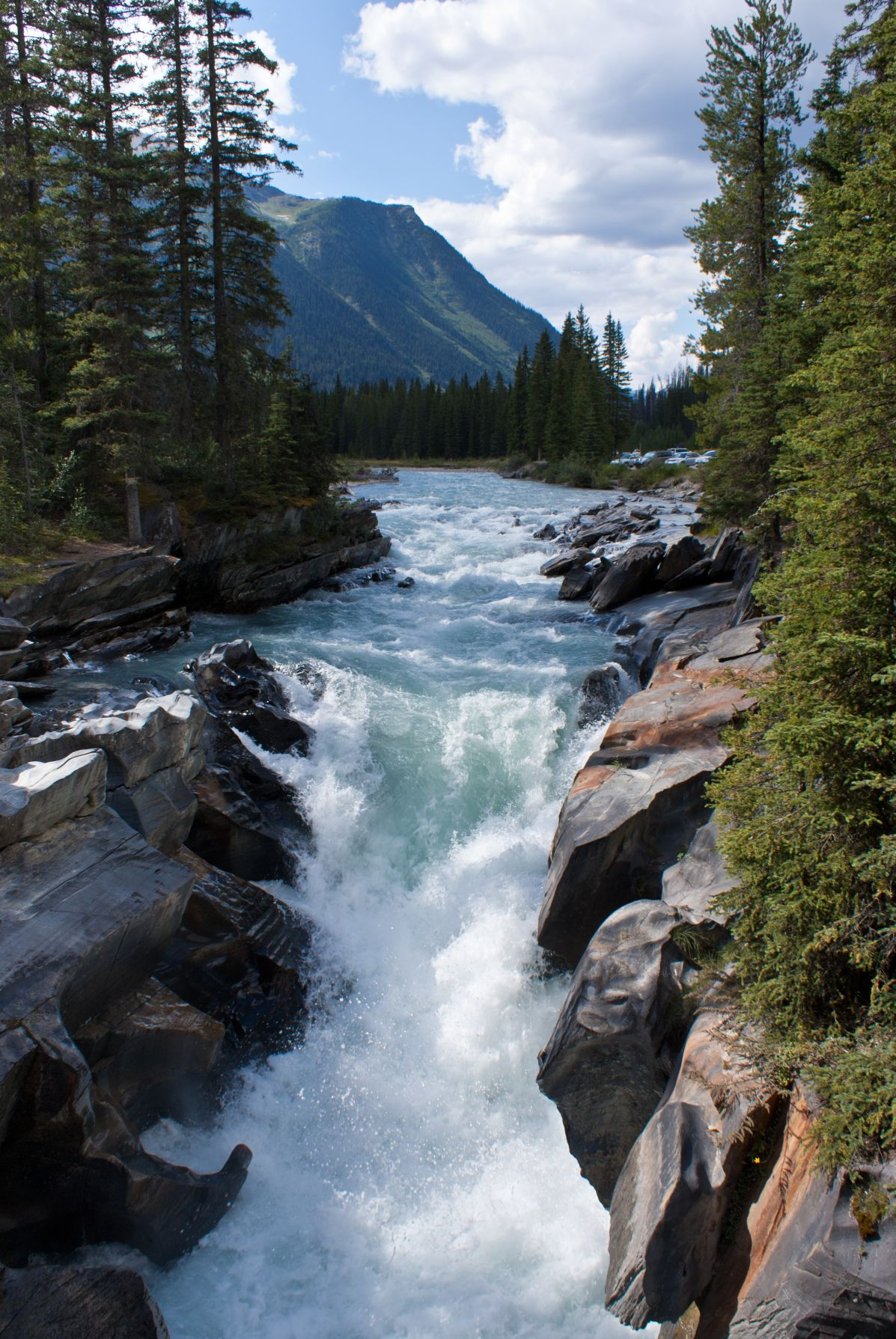
Numa Falls, looking upstream

Numa Falls is a waterfall of the Vermilion River located in Kootenay National Park, British Columbia, Canada.

It is accessible via a short drive off the Banff–Windermere Highway 93 that connects Banff National Park and Radium Hot Springs. While not a large waterfall, it is easily accessible directly by the roadside, travelling south from Marble Canyon.

== See also ==
- List of waterfalls
- List of waterfalls in British Columbia
- Helmet Falls
