= Banff–Windermere Highway =

Mountain pass road in Alberta and British Columbia

Banff–Windermere Highway
- Banff–Windermere Parkway; Highway 93; Highway 1B (1941–1959)

Route information
- Length: 105 km (65 mi) British Columbia: 94 km (58 mi); Alberta: 11 km (7 mi)
- Component highways: BC 93, AB 93

Major junctions
- South end: Highway 95 at Radium Hot Springs, BC
- Highway 1 (TCH) at Castle Junction, AB
- North end: Highway 1A at Castle Junction, AB

Location
- Country: Canada
- Provinces: British Columbia, Alberta

Highway system
- British Columbia provincial highways
- Alberta Numbered Highway Network; List; Former
← Highway 91A	BC 93	→ Highway 95
← Highway 88	AB 93	→ SPF

The Banff–Windermere Highway, also known as the Banff–Windermere Parkway, is a 105 km (65 mi) highway which runs through the Canadian Rockies in British Columbia and Alberta in Canada. It runs from Radium Hot Springs, British Columbia to Castle Junction, Alberta (midway between Banff and Lake Louise), passing through Kootenay National Park and Banff National Park. It is designated as part of British Columbia Highway 93 and Alberta Highway 93.

== Route description ==
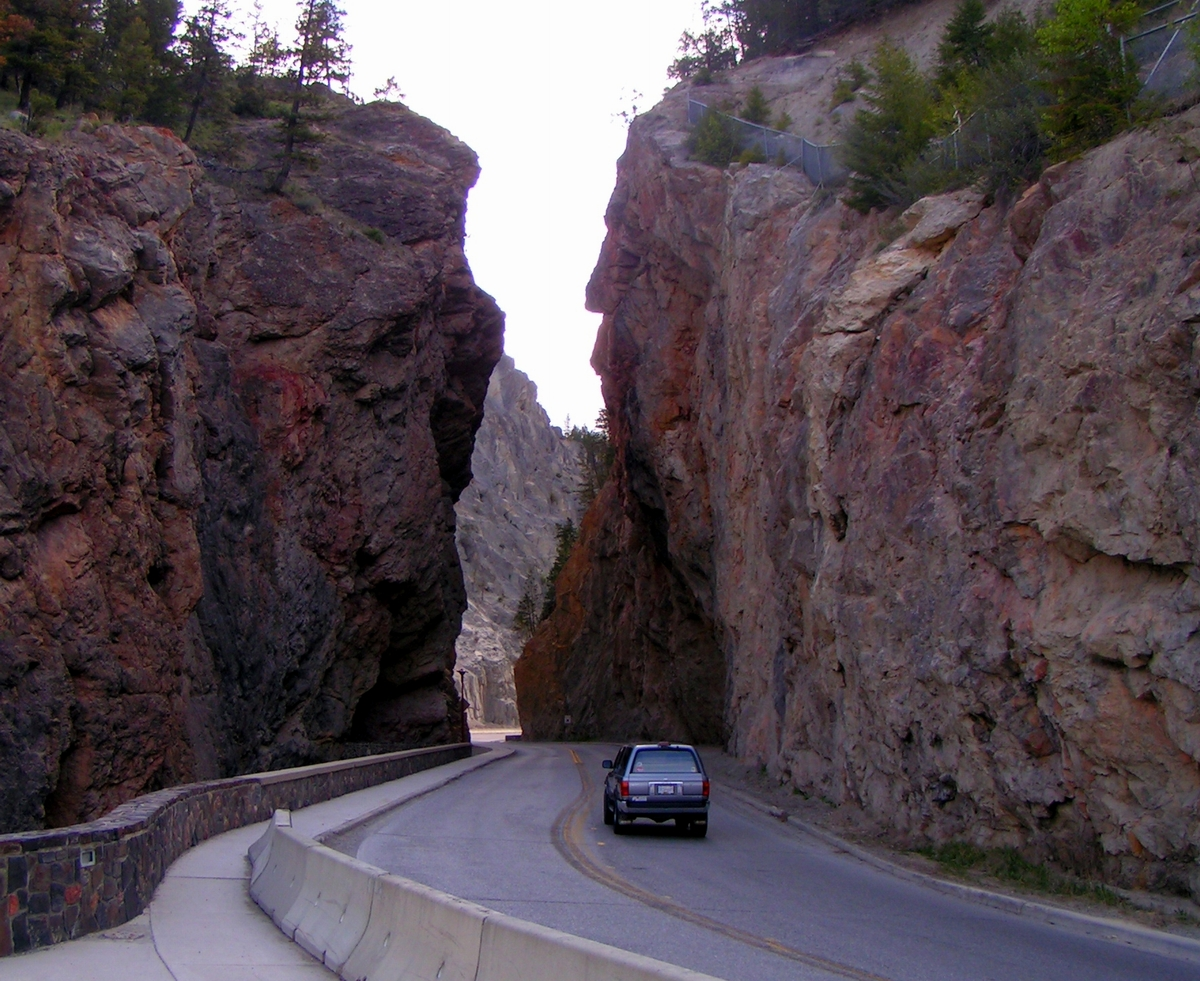
Highway 93 southbound, north of Radium Hot Springs, exit from Kootenay National Park

The Banff–Windermere Highway begins at British Columbia Highway 95 in village of Radium Hot Springs at the north end of the 134 km (83 mi) Highway 93/95 concurrency, approximately 15 km (9 mi) north of Windermere Lake where the highway gains its name. The highway passes through the village, passing numerous tourist services, overlooking Sinclair Creek. 1.3 km (0.8 mi) northeast of Highway 95, it enters Kootenay National Park, passing through the park gates. It continues through Sinclair Canyon and the Radium Hot Springs pools before passing through a short tunnel. East of the tunnel, the speed limit increases to 90 km/h (56 mph) and begins its climb to Sinclair Pass, reaching an elevation of 1,486 m (4,875 ft). East of the summit, the highway reaches a viewpoint of the Kootenay River valley, where it turns north and descends into the valley. The highway follows the Kootenay River to and area known as Kootenay Crossing, where the highway crosses the river and follows the Vermilion River. The highway follows the valley northeast and climbs up to Vermilion Pass at the Continental Divide, reaching an elevation of 1,680 m (5,510 ft). At the summit, the highway leaves both British Columbia and Kootenay National Park, entering Alberta and Banff National Park. The highway descends into the Bow River valley, with a full view of Castle Mountain, and intersects the Trans-Canada Highway (Alberta Highway 1) near Castle Junction, approximately 31 km (19 mi) west of Banff. From there, Highway 93 follows Highway 1 to Lake Louise, while the roadway (still referred to as part of the Banff–Windermere Highway) continues another 1 km (0.6 mi) to the Bow Valley Parkway (Alberta Highway 1A) on the north side of the Bow River.

== History ==
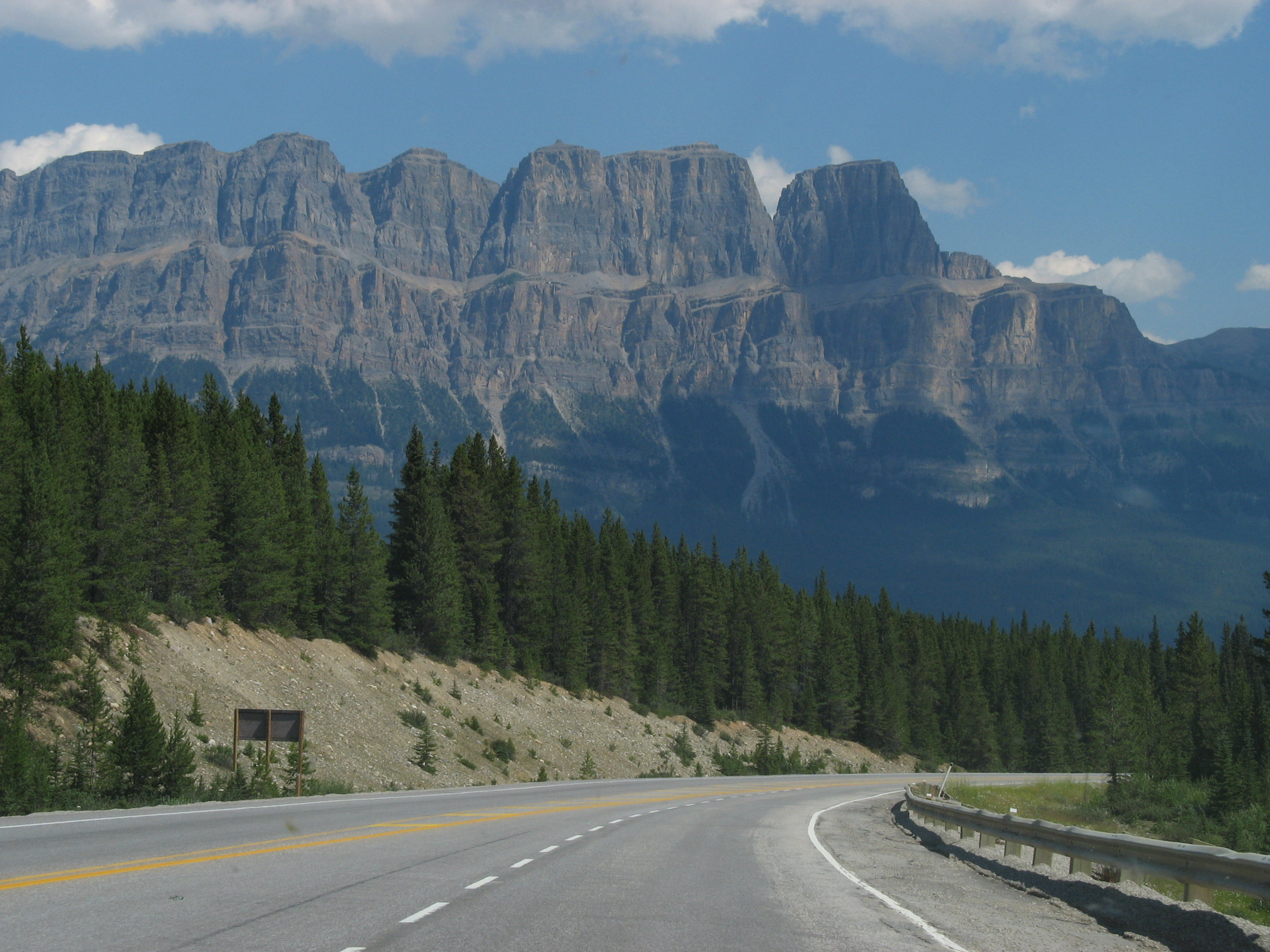
Castle Mountain, in Banff National Park, as seen from Highway 93 near the Alberta border.

The corridor along the Kootenay and Vermilion Rivers had been used as a first nations travel route for thousands of years. In 1858, Sir James Hector travelled through Vermilion Pass and recommended that it would be the best route for a wagon road. In the early 1900s settlers in the Columbia Valley advocated for improved connections with Banff and Calgary and lobbied the BC provincial government to construct a road. With the overall goal of constructing an all-Canadian road between the Canadian Prairies and Pacific Ocean, the Alberta provincial and federal governments were consulted. Construction began in 1911, and by 1914 the road was opened between Calgary and Vermilion Pass as well as a 19 km (12 mi) western section. The outbreak of World War I resulted in a suspension of construction, and following the conclusion of the war the British Columbia provincial government did not have enough funds to complete the project. The Banff–Windermere Road Agreement was reached whereby the federal government would complete the remaining 85 km (53 mi) of road, and in exchange they would receive a 5 mi (8 km) buffer of land on each side of the highway for conservation purposes; approximately 1,600 km^{2} (600 sq mi) in total. This resulted in the creation of Kootenay National Park. The road opened in 1922 and was first highway to cross the Central Canadian Rockies, with the Kicking Horse Trail across Kicking Horse Pass (the corridor which eventually became part of the Trans-Canada Highway) opening in 1926, connecting Lake Louise and Golden.

=== Former designations ===
Highway 1B
- Location: Kootenay National Park; Banff National Park
- Length: 105 km (65 mi)
- Existed: 1941–1959

The Banff–Windermere Highway took on the designation of Route 'U' in the 1930s until 1941 when British Columbia adopted a numbered highway system, and was designated as Highway 1B. In 1953, the highway between Roosville and Elko opened and was designated as Highway 93 as it was a northern extension of U.S. Route 93, and in 1959 the Banff–Windermere Highway and Icefields Parkway were renumbered to be a part of Highway 93.

== Major intersections ==
Province	District / Rural Municipality	Location	km	mi	Destinations	Notes
British Columbia	East Kootenay	Radium Hot Springs	0.0	0.0	Highway 93 / Highway 95 south – Golden, Invermere, Cranbrook	Southern terminus; Hwy 93 branches south; north end of Hwy 93 / Hwy 95 concurrency
British Columbia	Kootenay National Park	Radium Hot Springs	1.3	0.81	West gate of Kootenay National Park	
British Columbia	Kootenay National Park		12.4	7.7	Sinclair Pass (1,486 m / 4,875 ft)	
British Columbia	Kootenay National Park		43.8	27.2	Kootenay Crossing Bridge across the Kootenay River	
British Columbia – Alberta border			93.9	58.3	Vermilion Pass (1,680 m / 5,510 ft)	
Alberta	Banff National Park (I.D. No. 9)		103.9	64.6	Highway 1 (TCH) / Highway 93 north – Lake Louise, Jasper, Banff, Calgary	Interchange; Hwy 93 branches northwest; south end of Hwy 1 / Hwy 93 concurrency
Alberta	Banff National Park (I.D. No. 9)		104.3	64.8	Crosses the Bow River	
Alberta	Banff National Park (I.D. No. 9)	Castle Junction	105.0	65.2	Highway 1A (Bow Valley Parkway) – Lake Louise, Banff	Northern terminus; seasonal travel restrictions for Hwy 1A east
1.000 mi = 1.609 km; 1.000 km = 0.621 mi: Concurrency terminus
