= Foster Peak =

Mountain in British Columbia, Canada

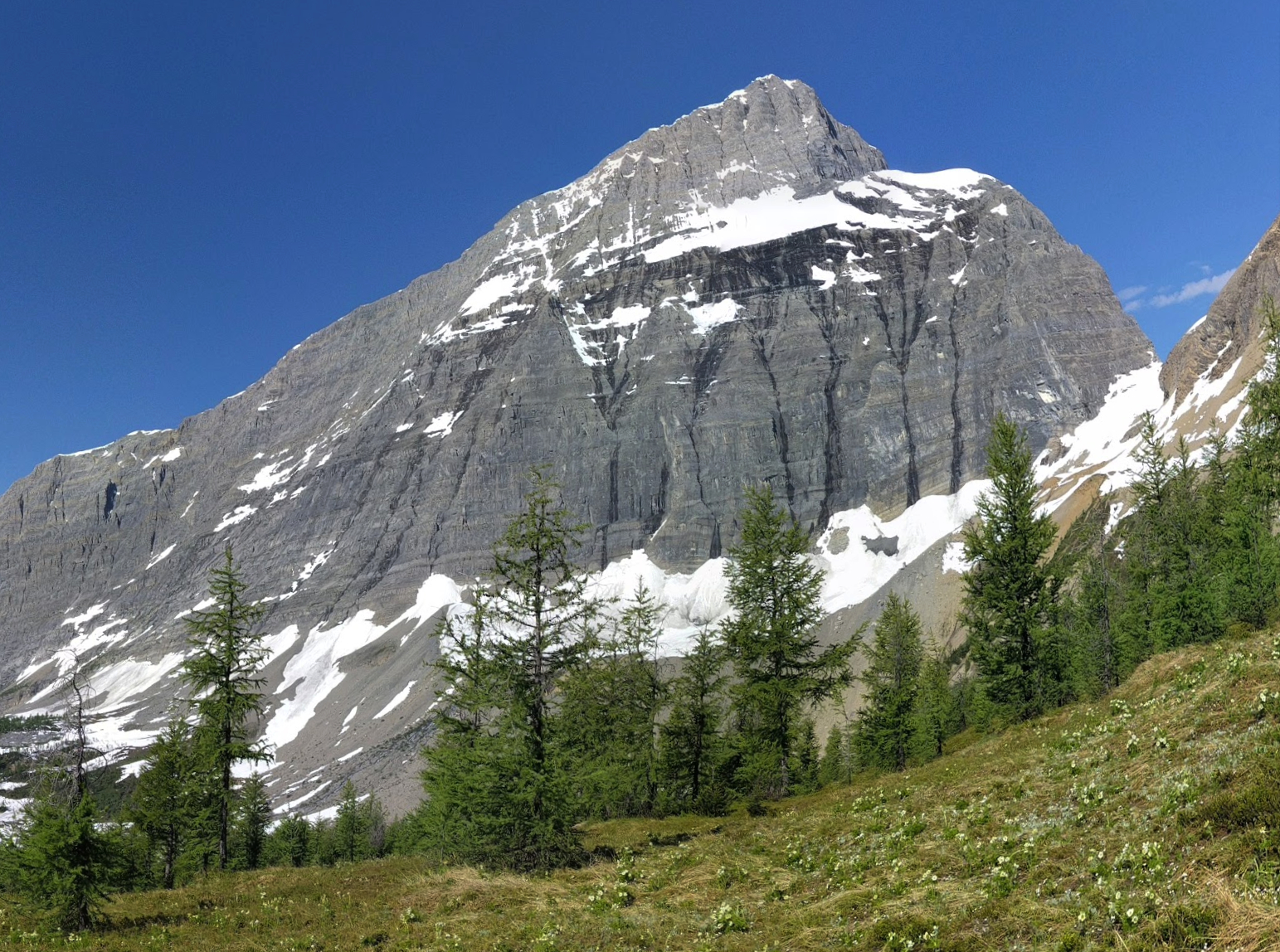
- Foster Peak, east aspect

Highest point
- Elevation: 3,201 m (10,502 ft) (Note: Other sources give 3,204 m.)
- Prominence: 996 m (3,268 ft)
- Parent peak: Mount Goodsir (3567 m)
- Listing: Mountains of British Columbia
- Coordinates: 51°03′56″N 116°09′51″W

Geography
- Location within British Columbia Location within Canada
- Interactive map of Foster Peak
- Country: Canada
- Province: British Columbia
- Protected area: Kootenay National Park
- District: Kootenay Land District
- Parent range: Vermilion Range; Canadian Rockies
- Topo map: NTS 82N1 Mount Goodsir

Geology
- Rock age: Cambrian
- Rock type: Ottertail Limestone

Climbing
- First ascent: 1933 Kate Gardiner, Ken Jones, Walter Feuz

Foster Peak is a 3,201-metre (10,502-foot) mountain summit located on the western border of Kootenay National Park. It is the highest point in the Vermilion Range, a sub-range of the Canadian Rockies of British Columbia, Canada. Its nearest higher peak is Mount Ball, 14.96 km (9.30 mi) to the northeast. The mountain is part of what is known as The Rockwall. Floe Lake, southeast of the peak, is one of the beauty spots of Kootenay National Park. The area is accessible via the Floe Lake Trail and Rockwall Trail. The Rockwall Trail is a scenic 55 km (34 mi) traverse of alpine passes, subalpine meadows, hanging glaciers, and limestone cliffs, in some places in excess of 900 m (3,000 ft) above the trail.

== History ==
The mountain was named in 1913 after William Wasbrough Foster, who that same year made the first ascent of Mount Robson, the highest point in the Canadian Rockies. In 1925 Foster was part of the first ascent team that climbed Mount Logan, the highest point in Canada.

The mountain's name was officially adopted in 1927 by the Geographical Names Board of Canada. The first ascent of Foster Peak was made in 1933 by Kate (Katie) Gardiner and Ken Jones, with Walter Feuz as guide.

== Geology ==
Foster Peak is composed of Ottertail limestone, a sedimentary rock laid down during the Precambrian to Jurassic periods and pushed east and over the top of younger rock during the Laramide orogeny.

== Climate ==
Based on the Köppen climate classification, Foster Peak is located in a subarctic climate zone with cold, snowy winters, and mild summers. Winter temperatures can drop below −20 °C with wind chill factors below −30 °C. Precipitation runoff from the mountain drains east into Floe Creek and Numa Creek which are both tributaries of the Vermilion River, or west into tributaries of the Kootenay River.

== See also ==
- List of mountains in the Canadian Rockies
- Geology of the Rocky Mountains
- Geography of British Columbia
