= Vermilion River (British Columbia) =

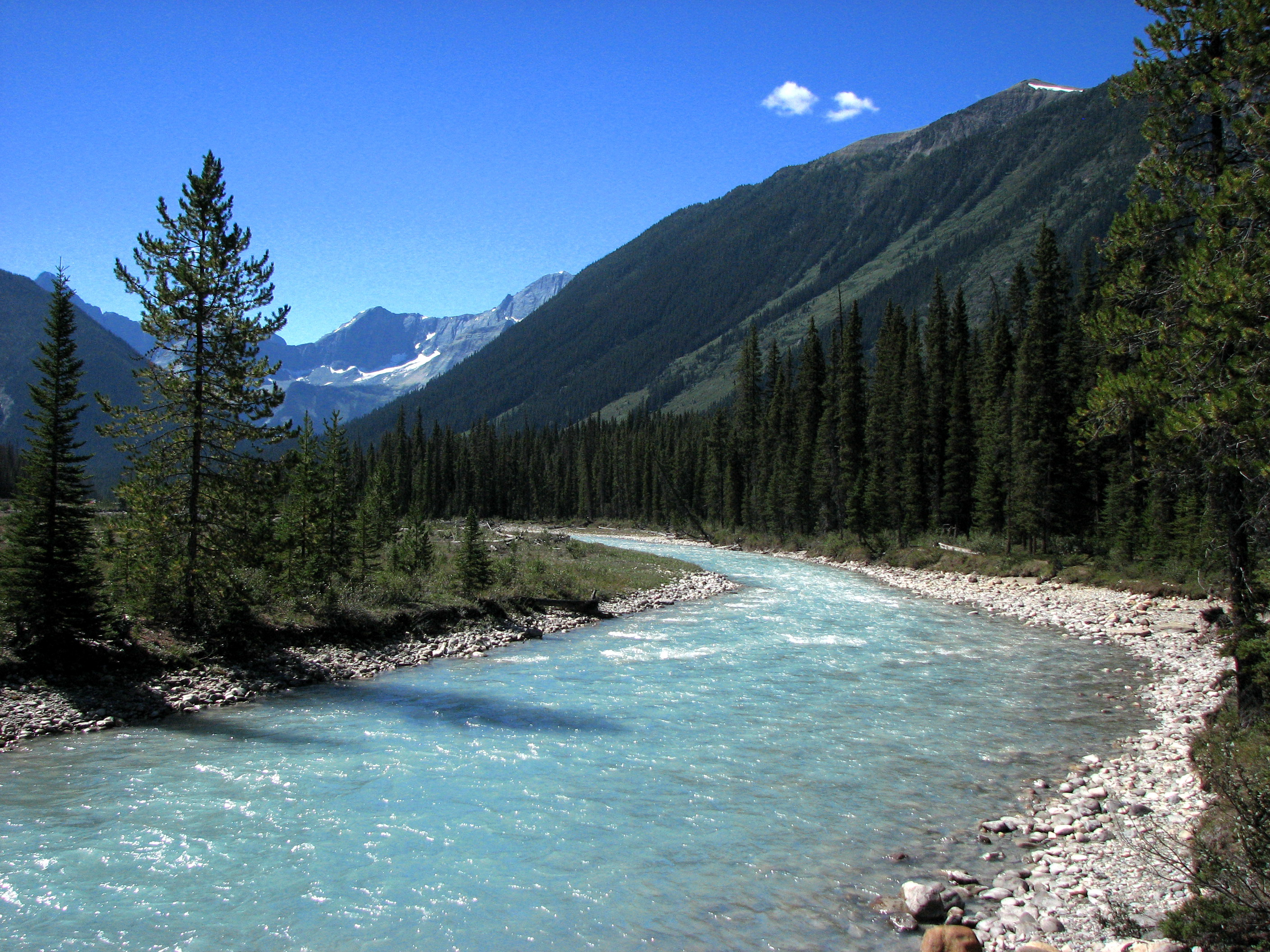

Location
- Country: Canada
- Province: British Columbia
- District: Kootenay Land District

Physical characteristics
- Source: Vermilion Pass
  - location: Kootenay National Park, British Columbia, Canada
- Mouth: Kootenay River
  - location: British Columbia
  - coordinates: 50°49′31″N 116°00′20″W

The Vermilion River, in Kootenay National Park, is headwatered at Vermilion Pass and flows through Vermilion Valley in British Columbia, Canada. Its tributaries include the Simpson River, Tokumm Creek, and Verendrye Creek. It is a major tributary of the Kootenay River.

First visited (by a non-Aboriginal) by Sir George Simpson in 1841.

Numa Falls on the river is directly accessible from Highway 93 in Kootenay National Park.

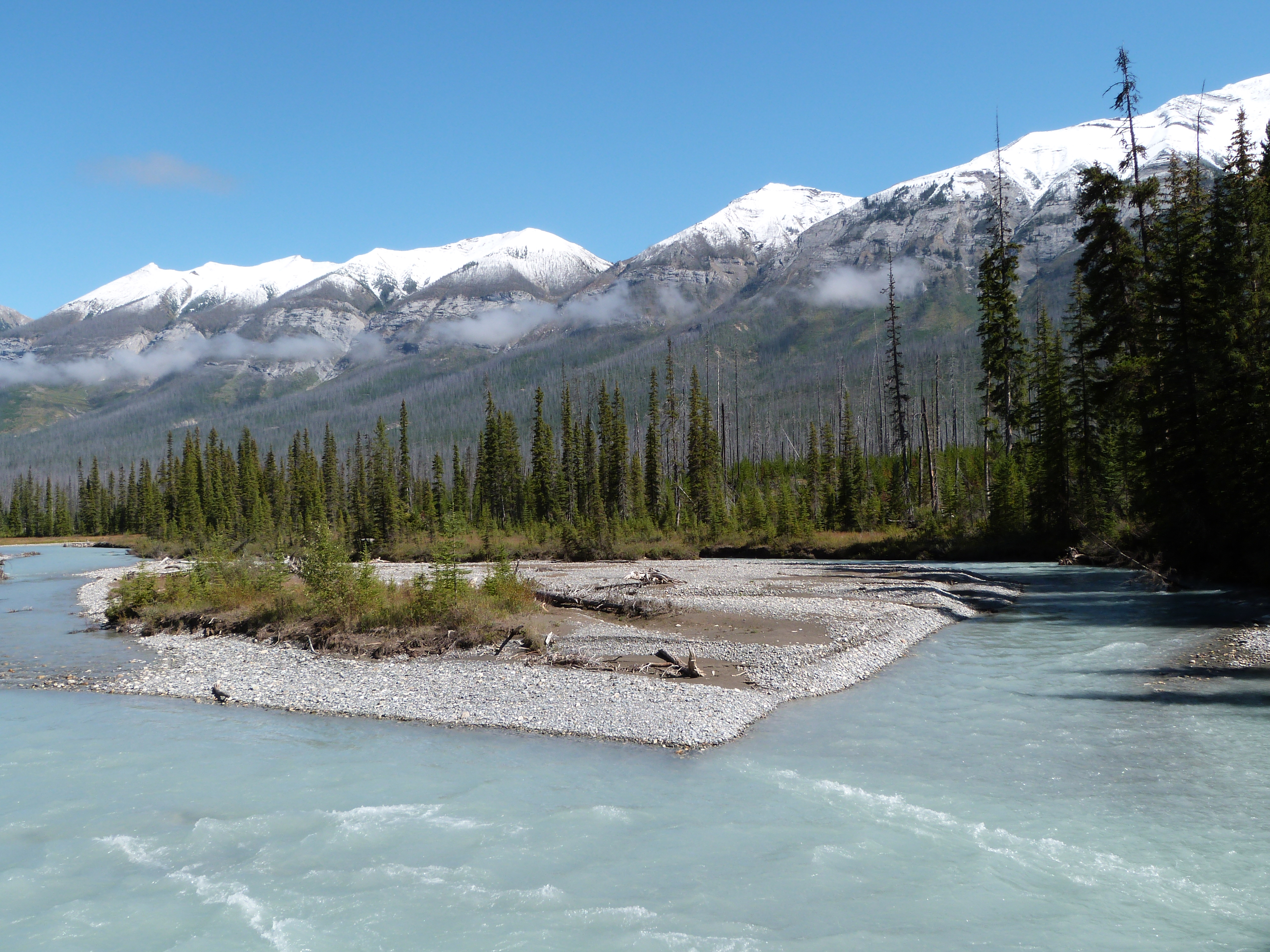
Vermilion River at the Simpson trailhead

== See also ==
- List of rivers of British Columbia
